= George Fitzmaurice =

American film director

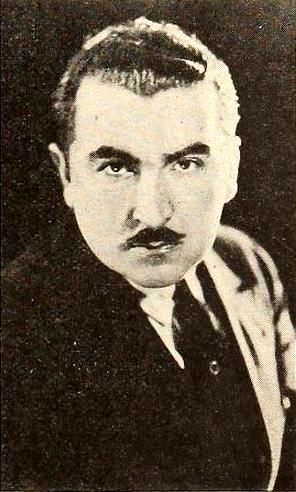
- Born: 13 February 1885; Paris, France
- Died: 13 June 1940 (aged 55); Los Angeles, California, U.S.
- Burial place: Forest Lawn Memorial Park
- Occupation: Film director
- Years active: 1914–1940
- Notable work: The Son of the Sheik; Raffles; Mata Hari
- Spouses: Ouida Bergere (married 1919–1924); Diana Kane (married 1927–1940)
- Children: 3

Signature
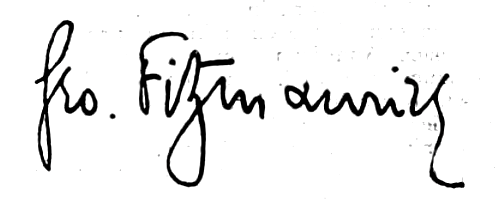

George Fitzmaurice (13 February 1885 – 13 June 1940) was an American film director and producer.

== Career ==
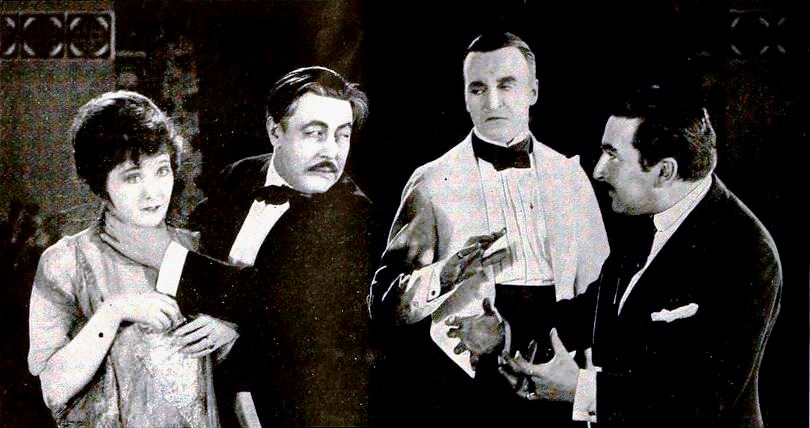
Fitzmaurice (right) directs Elsie Ferguson, Warner Oland, Wyndham Standing in The Witness for the Defense (1919)

Fitzmaurice's career first started as a set designer on stage. Beginning in 1914, and continuing until his death in 1940, he directed a total of over 80 films; several of these were successful, including The Son of the Sheik, Raffles, Mata Hari, and Suzy.

At the beginning of his directorial career, Fitzmaurice was astute at directing stage actresses in their initial films with the first wave of great Broadway stars that migrated to motion pictures during the World War I era, including Mae Murray, Elsie Ferguson, Fannie Ward, Helene Chadwick, Irene Fenwick, Gail Kane, and Edna Goodrich. Fitzmaurice's long-time cinematographer, Arthur Miller observed: “Fitzmaurice's specialty was in designing a film beautifully, and in handling women stars with great flair. He could do a beautiful love story very well. He had the ability to get the best out of women, to get along with them.”

The Son of the Sheik is his most famous extant silent film, no doubt aided by the sudden death of its star, Rudolph Valentino. Lilac Time is a classic war/romance film. Fitzmaurice, however, directed scores of silent films of which the majority of them are lost to the ravages of decomposition. Recent discoveries in Gosfilmofond in Russia include 1919's Witness for the Defense with Elsie Ferguson and 1922's Kick In with Bert Lytell. A restoration of his 1928 part-talkie hybrid The Barker is winning praise from many film buffs. Rumors of other Fitzmaurice films in Gosfilmofond include 1920s Idols of Clay (with Mae Murray) and Three Live Ghosts with Norman Kerry, Anna Q. Nilsson, Cyril Chadwick, and Edmund Goulding.

“I stayed with Fitzmaurice right through until 1925. He was a talented man until the “talkies”; he was only a man of the silents. He couldn't cope with the change.” Cinematographer Arthur Miller.

George Fitzmaurice advocated for ranking “serious film productions” among the Beaux Arts, and appraising them critically as such. Fitzmaurice was meticulous in his preparations prior to shooting and “knew beforehand everything he wanted to see on screen.” Like his filmmaking contemporaries F. W. Murnau and John Ford “he never looked through the camera” to frame his compositions, but nonetheless achieved a widely acknowledged “visual grace” in his pictures.

In his 1916 essay entitled “The Art of Directing,” Fitzmaurice emphasized the importance of engaging in a psychological analysis of the film characters to discover their motivations. He wrote:

A comprehensive knowledge of psychology in all its branches is a necessary complement to good directorship…to incorporate human nature into a picture you must understand the science of mental phenomenon, for it is this science that is guiding the hand of realistic action.

== Personal life ==
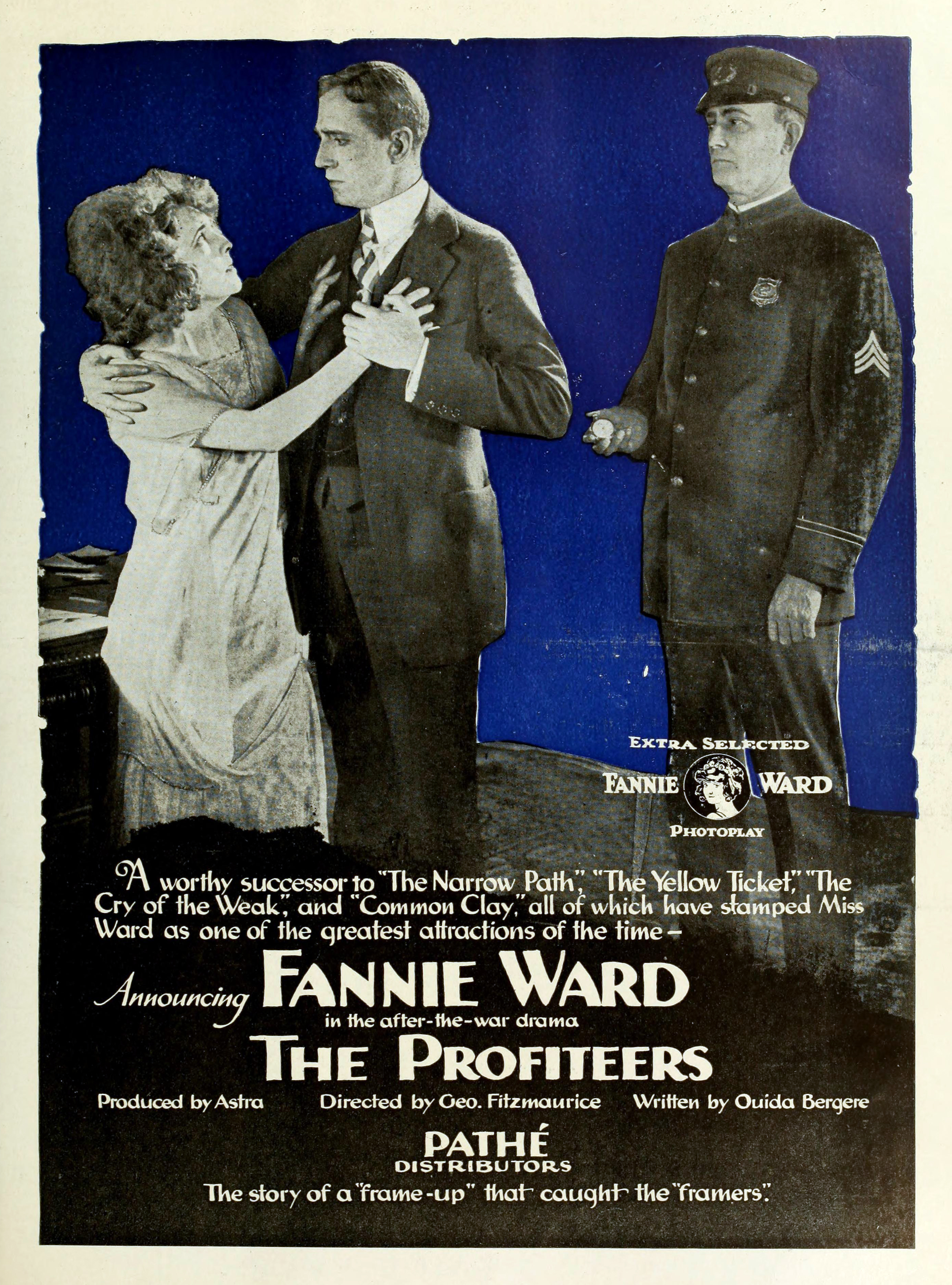
The Profiteers, 1919

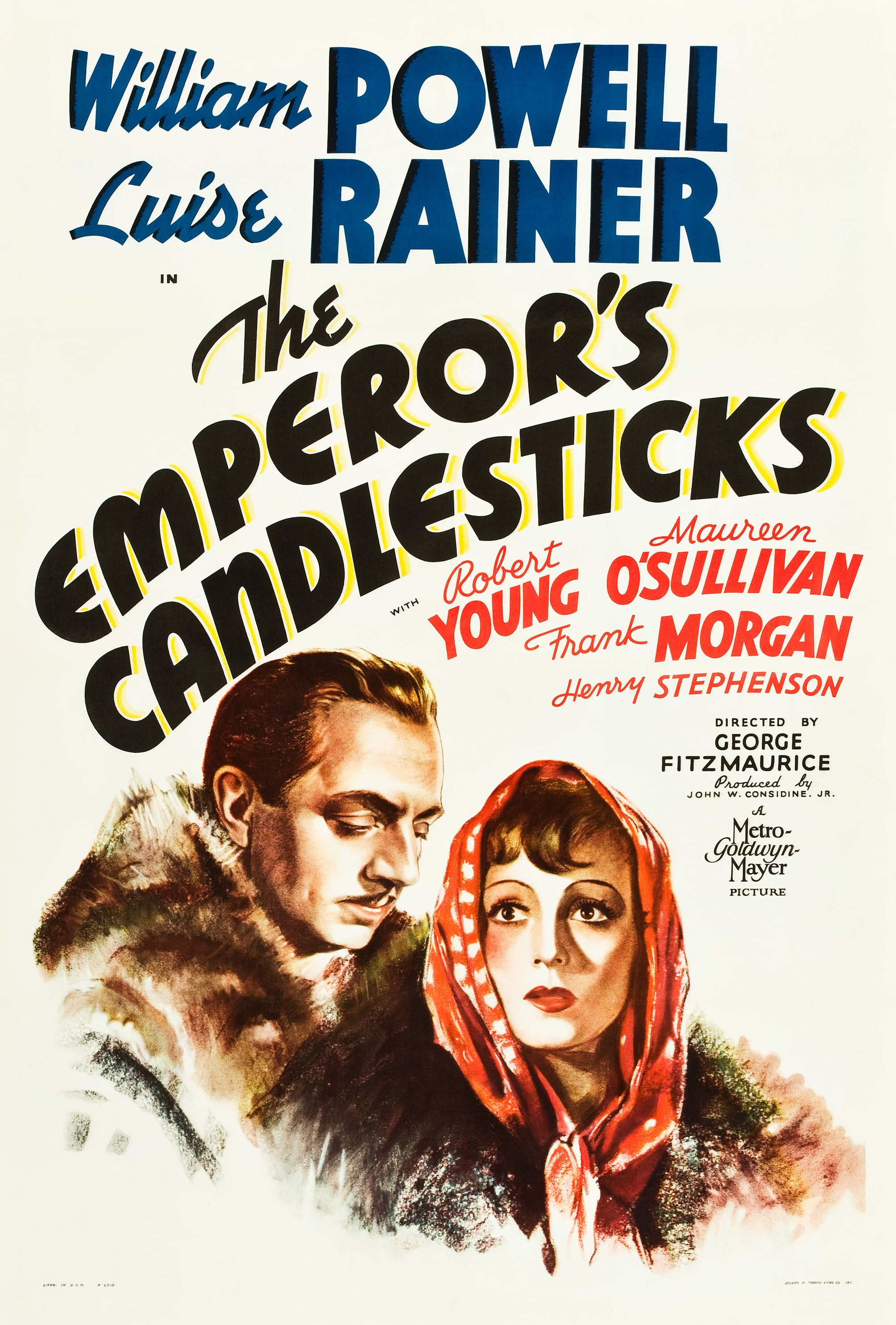
The Emperor's Candesticks, 1937

He was married at one time to Ouida Bergere, later the wife of Basil Rathbone. His second wife was Diana Kane, a sister of actress Lois Wilson. With Kane, he had two daughters.

== Filmography ==
=== Director ===
- When Rome Ruled (1914)
- Stop Thief! (1915)
- The Commuters (1915)
- At Bay (1915)
- Who's Who in Society (1915)
- Via Wireless (1915)
- The Money Master (1915)
- The Test (1916)
- Big Jim Garrity (1916)
- New York (1916)
- Arms and the Woman (1916)
- The Romantic Journey (1916)
- Kick In (1917)
- The Hunting of the Hawk (1917)
- The Recoil (1917)
- The Iron Heart (1917)
- Blind Man's Luck (1917)
- The On-the-Square Girl (1917)
- The Mark of Cain (1917)
- Sylvia of the Secret Service (1917)
- Innocent (1918)
- The Naulahka (1918)
- The Hillcrest Mystery (1918)
- A Japanese Nightingale (1918)
- The Narrow Path (1918)
- Common Clay (1919)
- The Cry of the Weak (1919)
- The Profiteers (1919)
- The Avalanche (1919)
- Our Better Selves (1919)
- A Society Exile (1919)
- The Witness for the Defense (1919)
- Counterfeit (1919)
- On With the Dance (1920)
- Right to Love (1920)
- Idols of Clay (1920)
- Paying the Piper (1921)
- Experience (1921)
- Forever (1921)
- Three Live Ghosts (1922)
- The Man from Home (1922)
- Kick In (1922)
- To Have and to Hold (1922)
- The Cheat (1923)
- Bella Donna (1923)
- The Eternal City (1923)
- Cytherea (1924)
- Tarnish (1924)
- A Thief in Paradise (1925)
- His Supreme Moment (1925)
- The Dark Angel (1925)
- The Son of the Sheik (1926)
- The Night of Love (1927)
- The Tender Hour (1927)
- Rose of the Golden West (1927)
- The Love Mart (1927)
- Lilac Time (1928)
- The Barker (1928)
- His Captive Woman (1929)
- Tiger Rose (1929)
- The Man and the Moment (1929)
- The Locked Door (1929)
- The Bad One (1930)
- Raffles (1930)
- The Devil to Pay! (1930)
- One Heavenly Night (1931)
- Strangers May Kiss (1931) uncredited
- The Unholy Garden (1931)
- Mata Hari (1931)
- As You Desire Me (1932) uncredited
- Rockabye (1932) uncredited
- Nana (1934)
- All Men Are Enemies (1934)
- Petticoat Fever (1936)
- Suzy (1936)
- The Last of Mrs. Cheyney (1937)
- The Emperor's Candlesticks (1937)
- Live, Love and Learn (1937)
- Arsène Lupin Returns (1938)
- Vacation from Love (1938)
- Adventure in Diamonds (1940)

=== Actor ===
- The Avalanche (1919) – (uncredited)
- Ben-Hur (1925) – Chariot Race Spectator (uncredited) (final film role)
