= On the Level (disambiguation) =

On the Level is a 1975 album by English rock band Status Quo.

On the Level may also refer to:

- On the Level, a 1915 American silent film directed by William Worthington
- On the Level (1917 film), an American silent Western film
- On the Level (1930 film), an American action film
- "On the Level", a 2000 single by Yomanda
- "On the Level", a 2021 song by Poppy from Flux (Poppy album)
