= His Supreme Moment =

1925 film by George Fitzmaurice

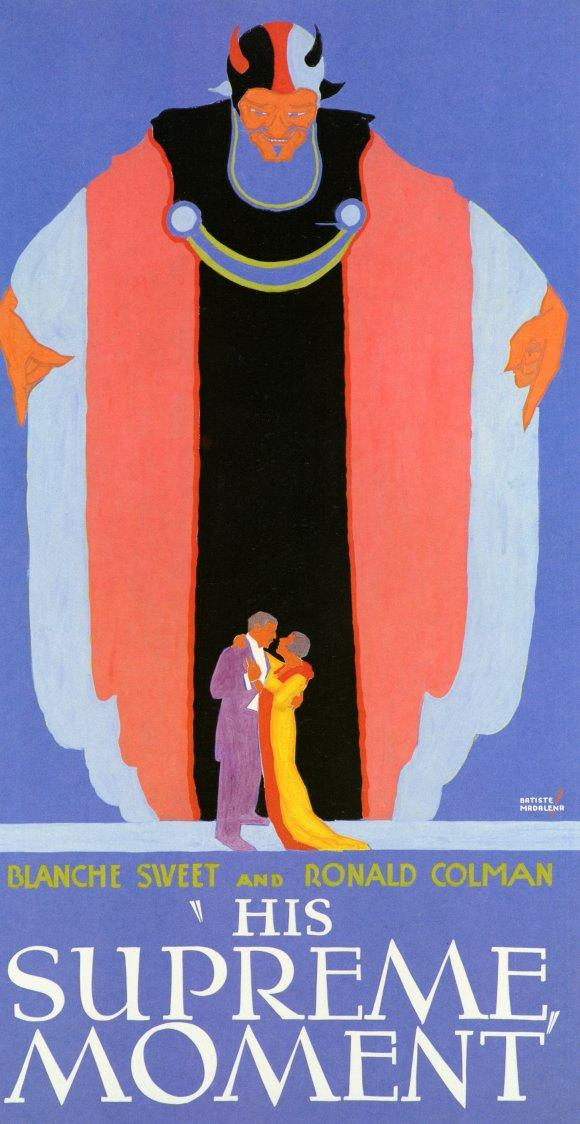
- Theatrical poster for His Supreme Moment
- Directed by: George Fitzmaurice
- Written by: Frances Marion (adaptation)
- Based on: World Without End by May Edginton
- Produced by: Samuel Goldwyn
- Starring: Blanche Sweet; Ronald Colman
- Cinematography: Arthur C. Miller
- Edited by: Stuart Heisler
- Production company: Samuel Goldwyn Productions
- Distributed by: First National Pictures
- Release date: May 3, 1925
- Running time: 80 mins.
- Country: United States
- Language: Silent (English intertitles)

His Supreme Moment is a 1925 American silent drama film with sequences filmed in Technicolor, starring Blanche Sweet and Ronald Colman, directed by George Fitzmaurice, and produced by Samuel Goldwyn. Anna May Wong has a small role as a harem girl appearing in a play. The film is now considered lost.

== Plot ==
As described in a film magazine review, engineer John Douglas returns to New York City from South America seeking financial backing for a mine. He meets the stage star Carla King when he attends the theater with his friend Harry Avon and young heiress Sara Deeping. The heiress pledges to secretly provide financial backing for the mine. John is in love with Carla and wishes to marry her, but, afraid of love, she proposes that they return to South America and she pose as his "sister." He accepts his plan. After a year in South America, Carla becomes ill. Sara decides to visit Douglas, but when she finds Carla with him she obtains their promise to return to New York City. Their plan having failed, John and Carla return. In New York City Sara successfully intrigues John so that he believes he loves her. Carla finds that her mother is being starred in her play on Broadway and jealously arises between them. They become co-starred in another production. The mother finally realizes her wrong, and she sends for John. He becomes engaged to Carla when he discovers that she loves him. They then return to South America with independent financial backing.

== Cast ==
- Blanche Sweet as Carla King
- Ronald Colman as John Douglas
- Kathleen Myers as Sara Deeping
- Belle Bennett as Carla Light
- Cyril Chadwick as Harry Avon
- Ned Sparks as Adrian
- Nick De Ruiz as Mueva
- Kalla Pasha as Pasha (in play)
- Anna May Wong as Harem Girl (in play)

== See also ==
- List of early color feature films
- List of lost films
