= A Japanese Nightingale =

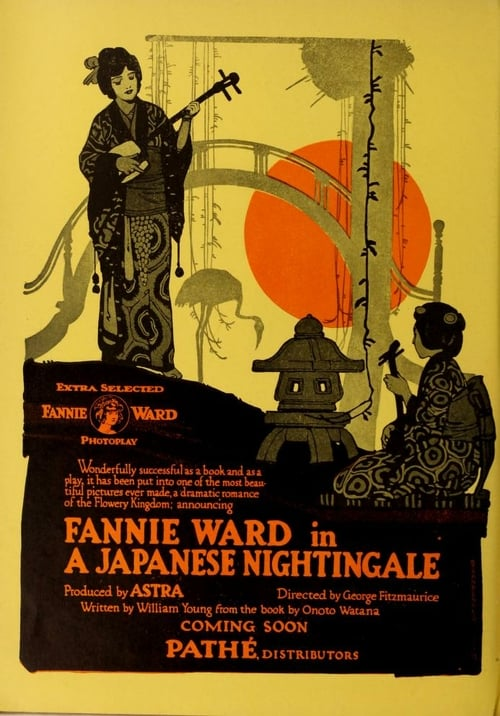
- Directed by: George Fitzmaurice
- Written by: Ouida Bergère; Jules Furthman
- Based on: A Japanese Nightingale (novel) by Winnifred Eaton A Japanese Nightingale (play) by William Young
- Starring: Fannie Ward; W. E. Lawrence; Yukio Aoyama
- Cinematography: Arthur C. Miller; Percy Hilburn
- Production company: Astra Film
- Distributed by: Pathé Exchange
- Release date: September 22, 1918
- Running time: 50 minutes
- Country: United States
- Languages: Silent; English intertitles

A Japanese Nightingale is a 1918 American silent drama film directed by George Fitzmaurice and starring Fannie Ward, W. E. Lawrence and Yukio Aoyama. It was adapted from a 1903 play of the same name by William Young, which was adapted from an Winnifred Eaton novel (published under the pseudonym "Otono Watanna"). In turn, Ouida Bergère and Jules Furthman adapted the play for the screen.

== Cast ==
- Fannie Ward as Yuki
- W. E. Lawrence as John Bigelow
- Yukio Aoyama

== Preservation ==
A print of A Japanese Nightingale is held by the Archives du Film du CNC in Bois d'Arcy.

== Bibliography ==
- Jay Robert Nash, Robert Connelly & Stanley Ralph Ross. Motion Picture Guide Silent Film 1910-1936. Cinebooks, 1988. ISBN 978-0-933997-10-3.
