= Tarnish (film) =

1924 film

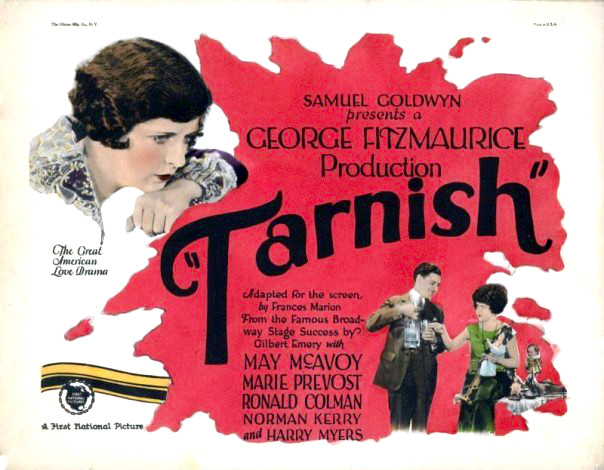
- Lobby card
- Directed by: George Fitzmaurice
- Written by: Frances Marion
- Based on: Tarnish (play) by Gilbert Emery
- Produced by: Samuel Goldwyn
- Starring: May McAvoy; Ronald Colman; Marie Prevost
- Cinematography: Arthur C. Miller; William H. Tuers
- Edited by: Stuart Heisler
- Production company: Goldwyn Pictures Corporation
- Distributed by: First National Pictures
- Release date: September 17, 1924
- Running time: 70 minutes
- Country: United States
- Language: Silent (English intertitles)

Tarnish is a lost 1924 American silent drama film directed by George Fitzmaurice based upon the play of the same name by Gilbert Emery and starring May McAvoy, Ronald Colman, and Marie Prevost.

== Cast ==
- May McAvoy as Letitia Tevis
- Ronald Colman as Emmet Carr
- Marie Prevost as Nettie Dark
- Albert Gran as Adolph Tevis
- Priscilla Bonner as Aggie
- Harry Myers as The Barber
- Kay Deslys as Mrs. Stutts
- Lydia Yeamans Titus as Mrs. Healy
- William Boyd as Bill
- Snitz Edwards as Mr. Stutts
- Mrs. Russ Whytal

== Preservation ==
With no holdings located in archives, Tarnish is considered a lost film.

== Bibliography ==
- Monaco, James. The Encyclopedia of Film. Perigee Books, 1991.
