= Blind Man's Luck =

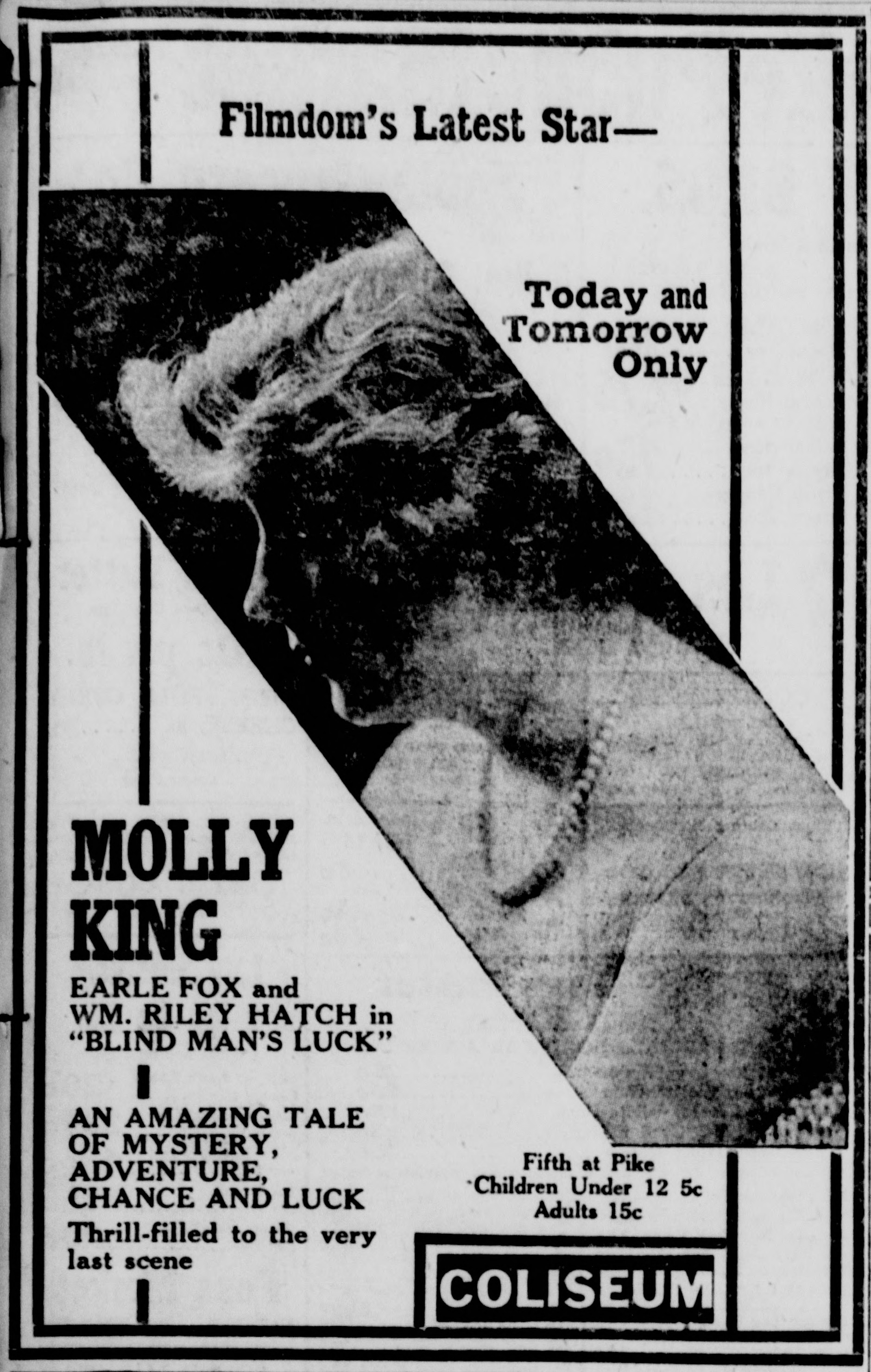
- Newspaper advertisement
- Directed by: George Fitzmaurice
- Written by: George B. Seitz
- Starring: Helene Chadwick; Mollie King; Earle Foxe
- Cinematography: Arthur C. Miller
- Production company: Astra Film
- Distributed by: Pathé Exchange
- Release date: June 10, 1917
- Running time: 50 minutes
- Country: United States
- Language: Silent (English intertitles)

Blind Man's Luck is a 1917 American silent drama film directed by George Fitzmaurice and starring Helene Chadwick, Mollie King, and Earle Foxe.

== Cast ==
- Helene Chadwick as Helen
- Mollie King as Eileen Caverly
- Earle Foxe as Boby Guerton
- Riley Hatch as Mr. Hatch
- Zeffie Tilbury as Mrs. Guerton
- Francis Byrne as Cromwel Crow

== Bibliography ==
- Donald W. McCaffrey & Christopher P. Jacobs. Guide to the Silent Years of American Cinema. Greenwood Publishing, 1999. ISBN 0-313-30345-2
