= The Hillcrest Mystery =

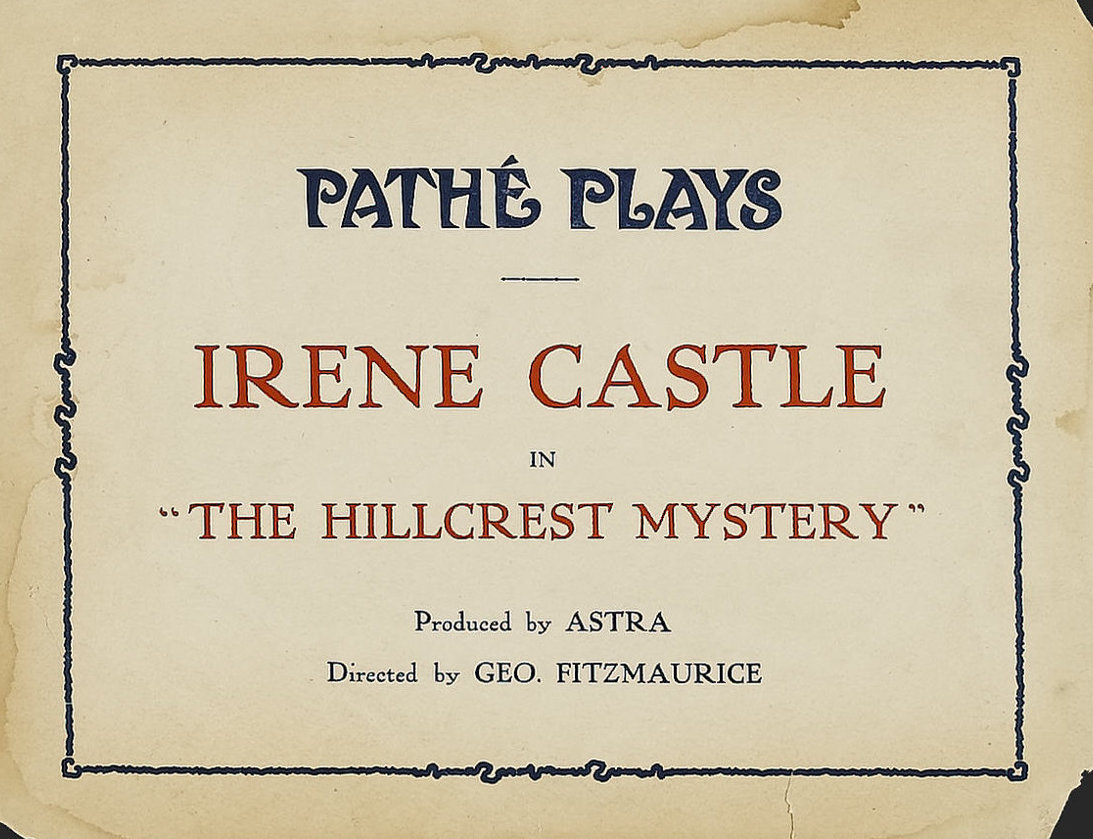
- Lobby card
- Directed by: George Fitzmaurice
- Written by: Ouida Bergère
- Starring: Irene Castle
- Cinematography: Arthur C. Miller
- Production company: Astra Film Corp.
- Distributed by: Pathé Exchange
- Release date: March 24, 1918
- Running time: 5 reels
- Country: USA
- Language: Silent..English titles

The Hillcrest Mystery is a 1918 American silent mystery film directed by George Fitzmaurice and starring Irene Castle. The film was released by Pathé Exchange in March 1918, only a month following the death of Irene Castle's husband and dance partner, Vernon Castle in an airplane accident.

== Cast ==
- Irene Castle - Marion Sterling
- J. H. Gilmour - Thomas Sterling
- Ralph Kellard - Gordon Brett
- Wyndham Standing - Hugo Smith
- DeWitt Jennings - Tom Cameron

== Preservation ==
With no prints of The Hillcrest Mystery located in any film archives, it is considered a lost film. In February 2021, the film was cited by the National Film Preservation Board on their Lost U.S. Silent Feature Films list.
