= Our Better Selves =

1919 film by George Fitzmaurice

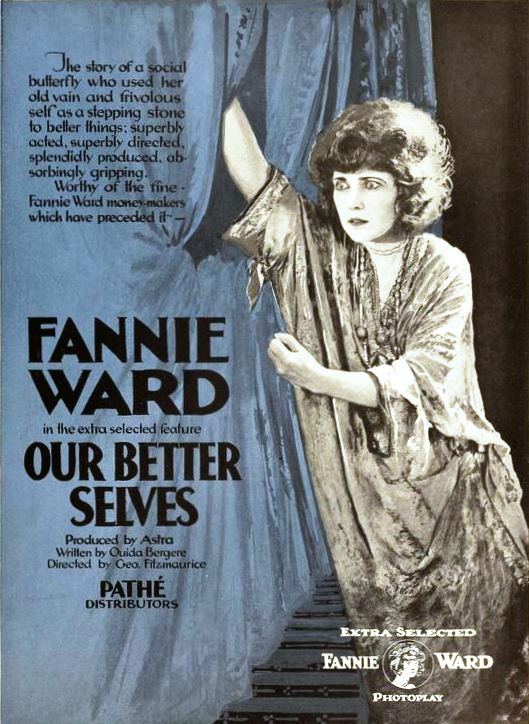
- Ad for the film from a 1919 issue of Motion Picture News
- Directed by: George Fitzmaurice; K. C. Stewart (asst. director)
- Written by: Ouida Bergère
- Cinematography: Arthur C. Miller
- Production company: Astra Film Corp.
- Distributed by: Pathé Exchange
- Release date: July 27, 1919
- Running time: 50 minutes
- Country: USA
- Languages: Silent; English titles

Our Better Selves is a 1919 American silent war drama film directed by George Fitzmaurice and starring Fannie Ward and Lew Cody. It was produced by Astra Film Corp and distributed by Pathé Exchange.

== Cast ==
- Fannie Ward - Loyette Merval
- Lew Cody - Willard Standish
- Charles Hill Mailes - Henry Laurens
- Mary Lee Wise

== Preservation ==
With no prints of Our Better Selves located in any film archives, it is considered a lost film. In February 2021, the film was cited by the National Film Preservation Board on their Lost U.S. Silent Feature Films list.
