= The Narrow Path (1918 film) =

1918 film directed by George Fitzmaurice

- Directed by: George Fitzmaurice
- Written by: Ouida Bergère; Jack Cunningham
- Based on: The Narrow Path (play) by John Montague
- Produced by: A.H. Woods
- Starring: Fannie Ward; W.E. Lawrence; Irene Aldwyn
- Cinematography: Percy Hilburn
- Production company: Astra Film Corp.
- Distributed by: Pathé Exchange
- Release date: December 15, 1918
- Running time: 50 minutes
- Country: United States
- Languages: Silent; English intertitles

The Narrow Path is a 1918 American silent drama film directed by George Fitzmaurice and starring Fannie Ward, W.E. Lawrence and Irene Aldwyn. The film was adapted for the screen by Ouida Bergère and Jack Cunningham based on a 1909 play of the same name by John Montague.

== Cast ==
- Fannie Ward as Marion Clark
- W.E. Lawrence as Dick Strong
- Irene Aldwyn as Gladys Strong
- Sam De Grasse as Malcolm Dion
- Mary Alden as Margaret Dunn
- Antrim Short as Jimmy Glidden
- Easter Walters

== Preservation ==
With no prints of The Narrow Path located in any film archives, it is considered a lost film. In February 2021, the film was cited by the National Film Preservation Board on their Lost U.S. Silent Feature Films list.

== Bibliography ==
- Paul C. Spehr. The Movies Begin: Making Movies in New Jersey, 1887-1920. Newark Museum, 1977.
