= The Cry of the Weak =

1919 film by George Fitzmaurice

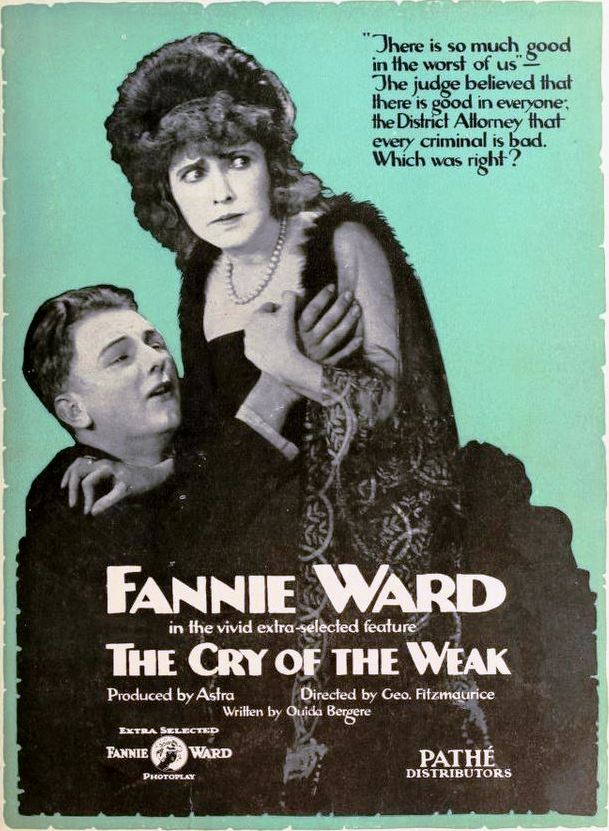
- Ad for the film from a 1919 issue of Moving Picture World
- Directed by: George Fitzmaurice; K. C. Stewart (asst. director)
- Written by: Ouida Bergère
- Starring: Fannie Ward
- Cinematography: Arthur C. Miller
- Production company: Astra Film Corp
- Distributed by: Pathé Exchange
- Release date: May 4, 1919
- Running time: 50 minutes; 5 reels
- Country: USA
- Languages: Silent; English intertitles

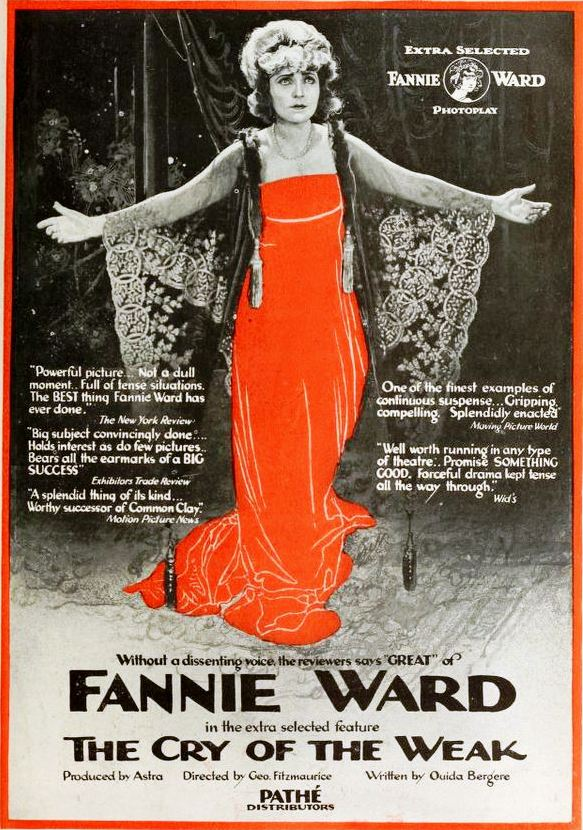
Ad for the film from a 1919 issue of Moving Picture World

The Cry of the Weak is a 1919 American silent drama film directed by George Fitzmaurice with an original story and scenario by Ouida Bergère and starring Fannie Ward. Astra Film Corp produced and Pathé Exchange distributed.

== Cast ==
- Fannie Ward - Mary Dexter
- Frank Elliott - District Attorney Dexter
- Walt Whitman - Judge Creighton
- Paul Willis - Budd

== Preservation ==
With no prints of The Cry of the Weak located in any film archives, it is considered a lost film. In February 2021, the film was cited by the National Film Preservation Board on their Lost U.S. Silent Feature Films list.
