= Innocent (1918 film) =

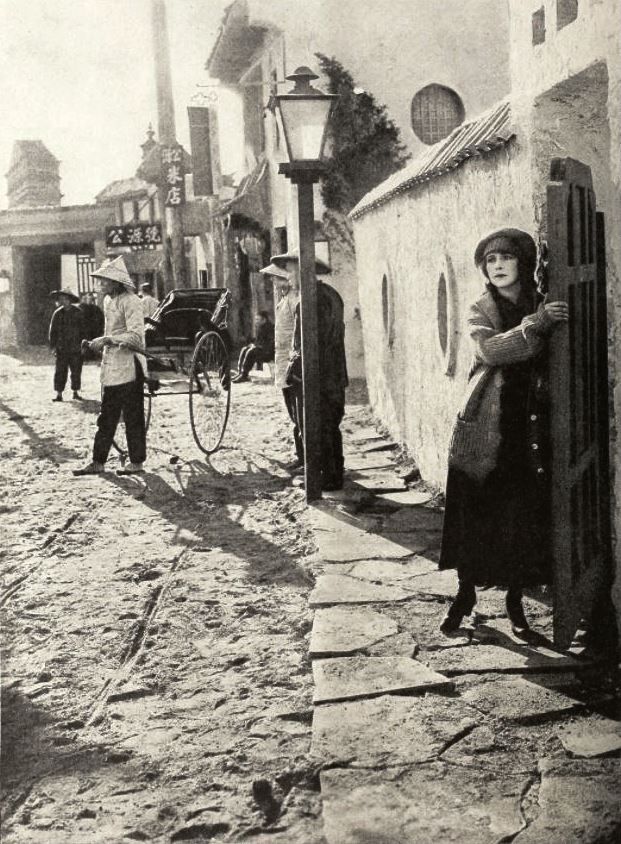
- Still with Fannie Ward
- Directed by: George Fitzmaurice
- Written by: Ouida Bergère
- Based on: Innocent (play) by George Broadhurst
- Produced by: A. H. Woods
- Starring: Fannie Ward; John Miltern; Armand Kaliz
- Cinematography: Percy Hilburn
- Production company: Astra Film
- Distributed by: Pathé Exchange
- Release date: January 27, 1918
- Running time: 50 minutes
- Country: United States
- Language: Silent (English intertitles)

Innocent is a 1918 American silent drama film directed by George Fitzmaurice and starring Fannie Ward, John Miltern, and Armand Kaliz. The film was based on a 1914 play of the same title by George Broadhurst and was adapted for the screen by Ouida Bergère.

The film's sets were designed by the art director William Cameron Menzies.

== Cast ==
- Fannie Ward as Innocent
- John Miltern as John Wyndham
- Armand Kaliz as Louis Doucet
- Frederick Perry as Peter McCormack
- Rae Allen as Undetermined Role
- Nathaniel Sack as Undetermined Role

== Preservation ==
With no prints of Innocent located in any film archives, it is considered a lost film. In February 2021, the film was cited by the National Film Preservation Board on their Lost U.S. Silent Feature Films list.

== Bibliography ==
- Jay Robert Nash, Robert Connelly & Stanley Ralph Ross. Motion Picture Guide Silent Film 1910-1936. Cinebooks, 1988.
