= The Eternal City (1923 film) =

1923 film by George Fitzmaurice

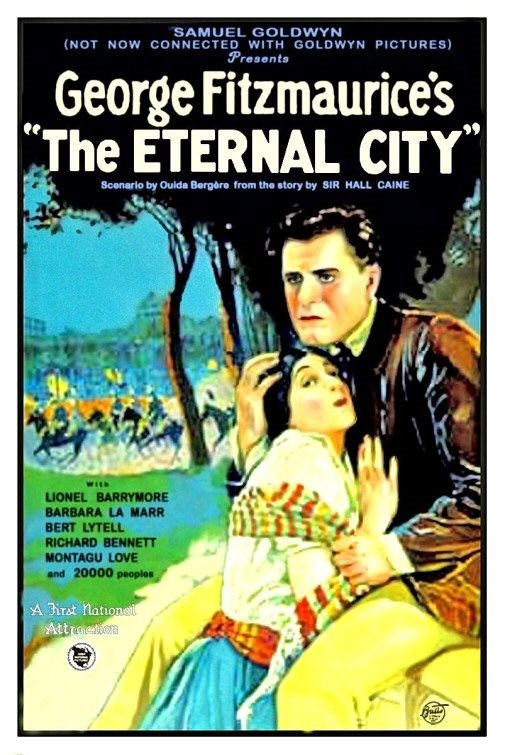
- 1923 theatrical poster
- Directed by: George Fitzmaurice
- Written by: Ouida Bergère (scenario)
- Based on: The Eternal City by Hall Caine
- Produced by: Samuel Goldwyn
- Starring: Lionel Barrymore; Bert Lytell; Barbara La Marr
- Cinematography: Arthur C. Miller
- Production company: Samuel Goldwyn Productions
- Distributed by: Associated First National
- Release date: December 17, 1923; (New York)
- Running time: 8 reels; 7,929 feet
- Country: United States
- Language: Silent (English intertitles)

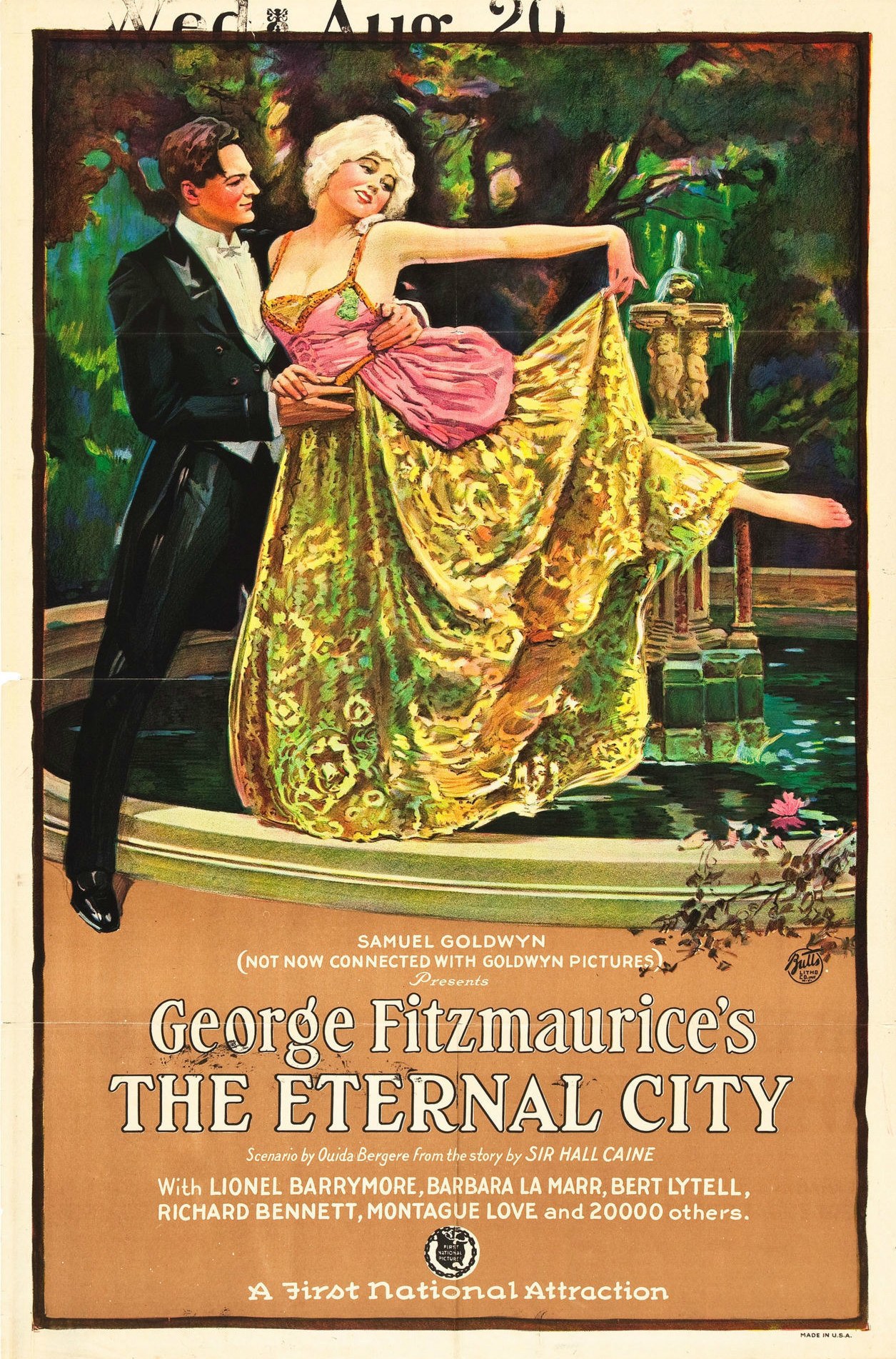
Alternate lobby poster.

The Eternal City is a 1923 American silent drama film directed by George Fitzmaurice, from a script by Ouida Bergère based on the 1901 Hall Caine novel of the same name, and starring Barbara La Marr, Lionel Barrymore, and Bert Lytell.

The film was produced by Samuel Goldwyn Productions, distributed by Associated First National, and was a remake of The Eternal City (1915) starring Pauline Frederick. This film is the second filming of the 1902 play starring Viola Allen which was also based on Caine's novel. This film is notable as the first production of Samuel Goldwyn's personal production company.

== Cast ==
- Barbara La Marr as Donna Roma
- Bert Lytell as David Rossi
- Lionel Barrymore as Baron Bonelli
- Richard Bennett as Bruno
- Montagu Love as Minghelli
- William Ricciardi as Auctioneer
- Betty Bronson as page boy
- Joan Bennett as page boy
- Ronald Colman as extra (uncredited)
- King Victor Emmanuel III as himself
- Benito Mussolini as himself

== Production ==
The entire story from the novel was changed by Ouida Bergere by eliminating every element of religion in the script. George Fitzmaurice filmed King Victor Emmanuel III and his prime minister, Benito Mussolini, reviewing Italian troops. In October 1923, Fitzmaurice sent Mussolini a copy of the finished film. Mussolini played a small role in the film and had been extremely helpful to Fitzmaurice and his company during their three months in Rome. Battalions of soldiers were delegated to appear in the film and guard the cast. Permission was obtained to use the Coliseum, the Forum and the Roman Baths, and the Old and New Appian Way as film locations.

== Preservation ==
The Eternal City is a partially lost film. The last two reels (28 minutes long) were rediscovered in 2006 by Italian film historian Giuliana Muscio in the archives of New York's Museum of Modern Art, and screened in 2014 at the Pordenone Silent Film Festival.

== See also ==
- Lionel Barrymore filmography
- List of incomplete or partially lost films
