= Cytherea (film) =

1924 film by George Fitzmaurice

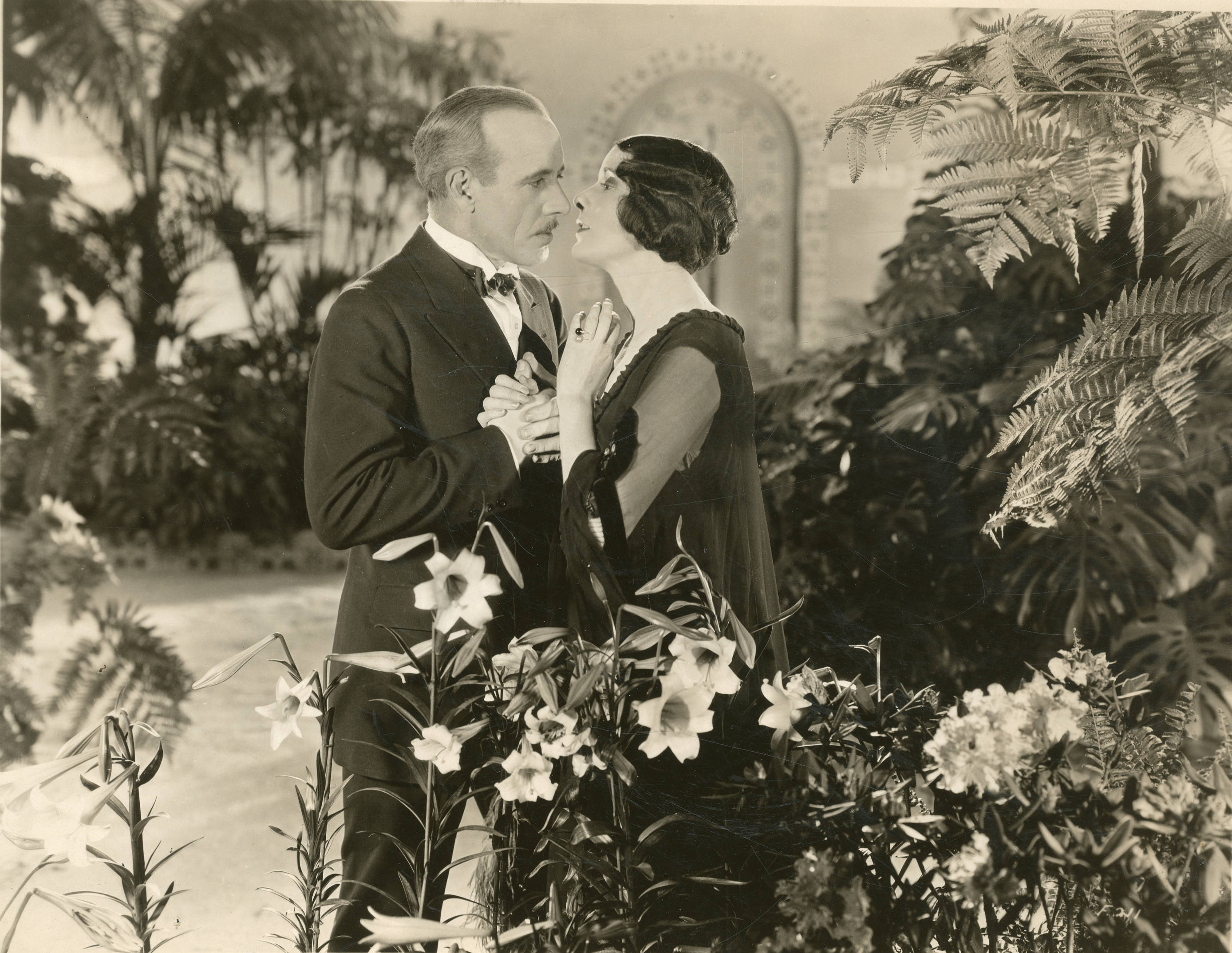
- Film still
- Directed by: George Fitzmaurice
- Written by: Frances Marion (adaptation)
- Based on: Cytherea, Goddess of Love by Joseph Hergesheimer
- Produced by: Samuel Goldwyn
- Starring: Alma Rubens; Constance Bennett; Norman Kerry; Lewis Stone; Irene Rich
- Cinematography: Arthur C. Miller; J. A. Ball (Technicolor consultant)
- Edited by: Stuart Heisler
- Production companies: Samuel Goldwyn Productions; Madison Productions
- Distributed by: Associated First National
- Release date: April 3, 1924
- Running time: 80 minutes
- Country: United States
- Language: Silent (English intertitles)

Cytherea is a 1924 American silent romantic drama film directed by George Fitzmaurice and starring Alma Rubens, Lewis Stone, Constance Bennett, and Norman Kerry. Based on the novel Cytherea, Goddess of Love, by Joseph Hergesheimer and was adapted for the screen by Frances Marion. Cytherea features two dream sequences filmed in an early version of the Technicolor color film process. The film is also known as The Forbidden Way.

== Plot ==
As described in a film magazine review, Lee Randon, forty years old and bored, sees his nephew Morris becoming infatuated with Mina Raff and reproaches him. Later, when Morris leaves his wife to go with Mina, contented housewife Fanny Randon, who has no patience with modern ideas like dancing or jazz entertainment, asks her husband to plead with the young woman to release his nephew so he can return to his wife. In carrying out the mission, Randon in turn becomes infatuated with Savina Grove, a married woman of deep passion which has been untouched until she meets Randon. Randon and Savina elope and go to Cuba. Ostracized by his infraction of society's laws, Randon is denied admittance to the home of his brother. Savina is taken ill and dies. Randon returns to his home, where he is welcomed back by his wife.

== Cast ==
- Irene Rich as Fanny Randon
- Lewis Stone as Lee Randon
- Norman Kerry as Peyton Morris
- Betty Bouton as Claire Morris
- Alma Rubens as Savina Grove
- Charles Wellesley as William Grove
- Constance Bennett as Annette Sherman
- Peaches Jackson as Randon Child
- Mickey Moore as Randon Child
- Hugh Saxon as Randon Butler
- Lee Hill as Grove Butler
- Lydia Yeamans Titus as Laundress
- Brandon Hurst as Daniel Randon

== Production ==
The film was produced by Samuel Goldwyn Productions and released by Associated First National Pictures. Cytherea was the first Technicolor film made under artificial light, while previous Technicolor films were made outdoors under natural light.

== Preservation ==
With no copies of Cytherea found in any film archives, it is a lost film.

== See also ==
- List of early color feature films
- List of lost films
