= John Miltern =

American actor

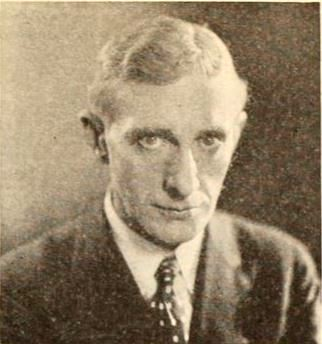
Miltern in the film Experience (1921)

John Miltern (1870 – January 16, 1937) was an actor in theater and films in the United States. He was in the Broadway play Yellow Jack. He was also in Channing Pollock's play Roads of Destiny. Another of his stage performances was described as manly and always sympathetic.

In 1927, he was one of the actors arrested for performing in theater productions determined to be indecent by authorities.

Miltern was struck by a car in January 1937 and died at the scene.

== Filmography ==
- New York (1916) as Oliver King
- Her Final Reckoning (1918) as Prince Zilah
- Innocent (1918) as John Wyndham
- Let's Get a Divorce (1918) as Henri de Prunelles
- The Profiteers (1919)
- On with the Dance (1920)
- Experience (1921) as Experience
- The Kentuckians (1921) as Colton
- The Hands of Nara (1922)
- Kick In (1922)
- Love's Boomerang (1922)
- Manslaughter (1922)
- The Man Who Saw Tomorrow (1922)
- Three Live Ghosts (1922)
- The Ne'er-Do-Well (1923) as Stephen Courtlandt
- Tongues of Flame (1924) as Scanlon
- Coming Through (1925) as John Rand
- Fine Manners (1926)
- East Side, West Side (1927)
- The Love of Sunya (1927)
- Big Town (1932)
- Social Register (1934) as Mr. Henry Breene
- Ring Around the Moon (1936) as Mr. Endicott
- Parole! (1936) as Governor Slade
- Sins of Man (1936) as Mr. Hall
- Murder on a Bridle Path (1936)
- Everybody's Old Man (1936)
