= The Naulahka (film) =

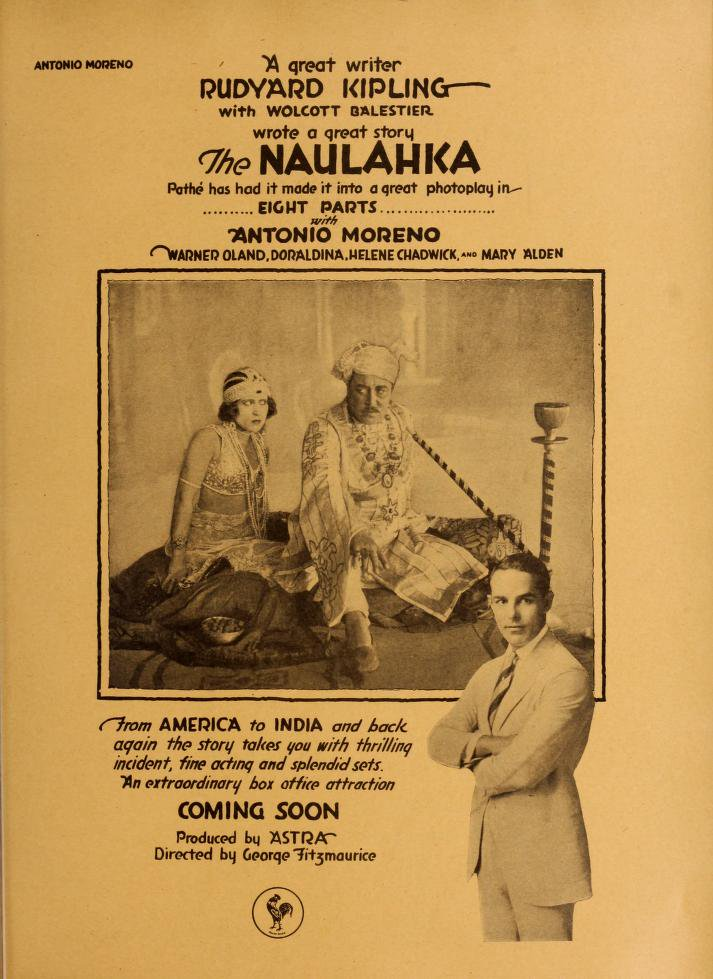
- Directed by: George Fitzmaurice
- Written by: Charles Wolcott Balestier (novel); Rudyard Kipling (poem); George B. Seitz
- Starring: Antonio Moreno; Helene Chadwick; Warner Oland
- Cinematography: Arthur C. Miller
- Production company: Astra Film Corp
- Distributed by: Pathé Exchange
- Release date: February 24, 1918
- Running time: 80 minutes
- Country: United States
- Languages: Silent; English intertitles

The Naulahka is a 1918 American silent adventure film directed by George Fitzmaurice and starring Antonio Moreno, Helene Chadwick and Warner Oland. It was made for a reported cost of $100,000 leading the studio to claim it was the most expensive film ever made, although many earlier productions had in fact been made with larger budgets. It is based on a poem of the same name by Rudyard Kipling. Originally eight reels long, it was later shortened to six with a running time of around an hour.

The film's sets were designed by the art directors Anton Grot and William Cameron Menzies. It was shot at the Solax Studios at Fort Lee, the traditional center of the American film industry.

== Cast ==
- Antonio Moreno as Nicholas Tarvin
- Doraldina as Sitahbai
- Helene Chadwick as Kate Sheriff
- J. H. Gilmour as Mr. Mutrie
- Warner Oland as Maharajah
- Mary Alden as Prince's Mother
- Edna Hunter as Mrs. Mutrie

== Preservation ==
The film survives in prints at Lobster Films and the Academy Film Archive, Beverly Hills.

== Bibliography ==
- Ward, Richard Lewis. When the Cock Crows: A History of the Pathé Exchange. SIU Press, 2016.
