= Her Strange Wedding =

1917 film by George Melford

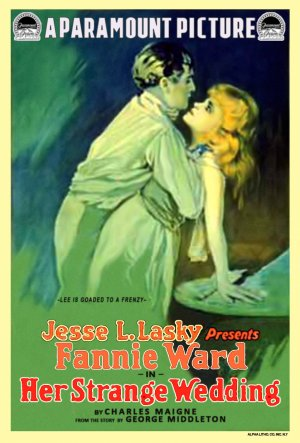
- Theatrical release poster
- Directed by: George Melford
- Screenplay by: Charles Maigne; George Middleton
- Produced by: Jesse L. Lasky
- Starring: Fannie Ward; Jack Dean; Tom Forman; William Elmer
- Cinematography: Percy Hilburn (French)
- Production company: Jesse L. Lasky Feature Play Company
- Distributed by: Paramount Pictures
- Release date: June 25, 1917
- Running time: 50 minutes
- Country: United States
- Language: Silent..English titles

Her Strange Wedding is a lost 1917 American drama silent film directed by George Melford and written by Charles Maigne and George Middleton. The film stars Fannie Ward, Jack Dean, Tom Forman and William Elmer. The film was released on June 25, 1917, by Paramount Pictures.

== Plot ==
According to a film magazine, "Dr. Max Brownell loves Coralie Grayson, but when Coralie meets Lee, the doctor's brother, it is a case of love at first sight and a short time after they are married.

Lee has taken money from his former employer and is fleeing the law. For the honeymoon the young people go to Honolulu. Max, disappointed over the turn of affairs, also goes to Honolulu to be alone. He meets Lee and Coralie on the steamer and Lee becomes jealous of Max.

Lee is the victim of a weak heart and in one of his moments of rage at Max he becomes ill. They arrive at Honolulu and while convalescing Lee notices the attention Max pays Coralie and decides to shoot him. On the beach the two brothers engage in a fight and Max is victorious. Coralie realizes her mistake and also realizes that she has always loved Max."

== Cast ==
- Fannie Ward as Coralie Grayson
- Jack Dean as Dr. Max Brownell
- Tom Forman as Lee Brownell
- William Elmer as Peter

== Censorship ==
Before Her Strange Wedding could be exhibited in Kansas, the Kansas Board of Review required the removal of all scenes where Lee is drinking on the ship, and to shorten the struggle in the bedroom between Coralie and Lee. Similarly, the Chicago Board of Censors removed the struggle scene, but also removed scenes of a bracelet theft and a shooting.
