= New York (1916 film) =

1916 film by George Fitzmaurice

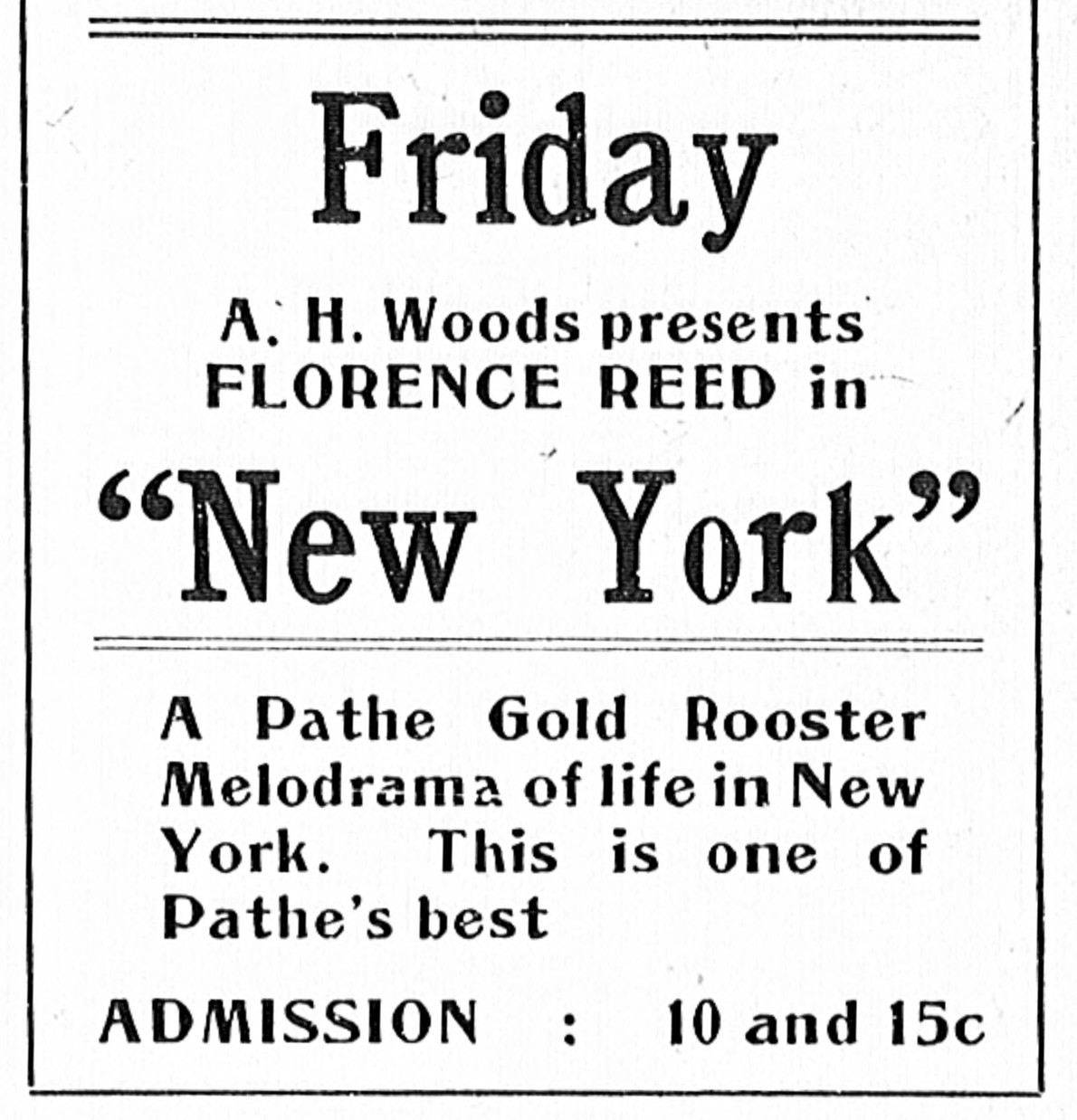
- Contemporary advertisement
- Directed by: George Fitzmaurice
- Written by: Ouida Bergère
- Based on: New York by William J. Hurlbut
- Produced by: A. H. Woods; George Fitzmaurice
- Starring: Florence Reed
- Cinematography: Arthur C. Miller
- Production companies: Pathé Exchange; Astra Film Company
- Distributed by: Pathé Exchange
- Release date: February 4, 1916
- Running time: 50 minutes
- Country: United States
- Language: Silent (English intertitles)

New York is a 1916 American silent comedy drama film directed by George Fitzmaurice and starring Florence Reed. It was adapted by Ouida Bergère from a 1910 William J. Hurlbut play of the same title. The film was distributed by the Pathé Exchange company.

== Cast ==
- Florence Reed as Nora Nelson, later Mrs. King
- Fania Marinoff as Edna Macey, The Chorus Girl
- John Miltern as Oliver King
- Jessie Ralph as Mrs. Macey
- Forrest Winant as Wendell King

== Plot ==
A melodrama about Oliver King, who is interested in a chorus girl and, after she dies, raises her child, thinking he is the father. As a young adult, the "son", Wendell, is killed by King's wife, in a drunken brawl, which is ruled a suicide. Later, when the chorus girls' money comes to collect her "hush" money, she claims the boy had never been his. This leads him to reconcile with his wife.

== Censorship ==
Like many American films of this time period, New York was subject to cuts by city and state film censorship boards. For example, in 1918 the Chicago Board of Censors issued an Adults Only permit for the film and required a cut, in Reel 2, of the two intertitles "Edna enjoys the luxuries that King provides her" and "And thus Oliver King becomes a benedict", and, Reel 3, two views of a nude model. The Ohio Board of Censors required a cut of a scene with a woman smoking, scene at table where a young woman lies back in man's arms while she smokes a cigarette, a cut to three feet of film a scene of young woman dancing on a table, to five feet of film of scene where drunken woman smokes a cigarette, remove the intertitles "You bet I'll come to your party. This virtuous life is hell", "You can't leave me now when I am about to be a mother", "You're only my guardian, you know, and I'll do as I d----d please", and "God! How beautiful you are tonight. What a fool you were to marry a man as old as King.", and also cut out all scenes of woman posing in the nude, the murder, and scene in cabaret where man at table catches girl by her foot as she dances by him.

== Preservation ==
With no prints of New York located in any film archives, it is considered a lost film. In February 2021, the film was cited by the National Film Preservation Board on their Lost U.S. Silent Feature Films list.
