= The Hunting of the Hawk =

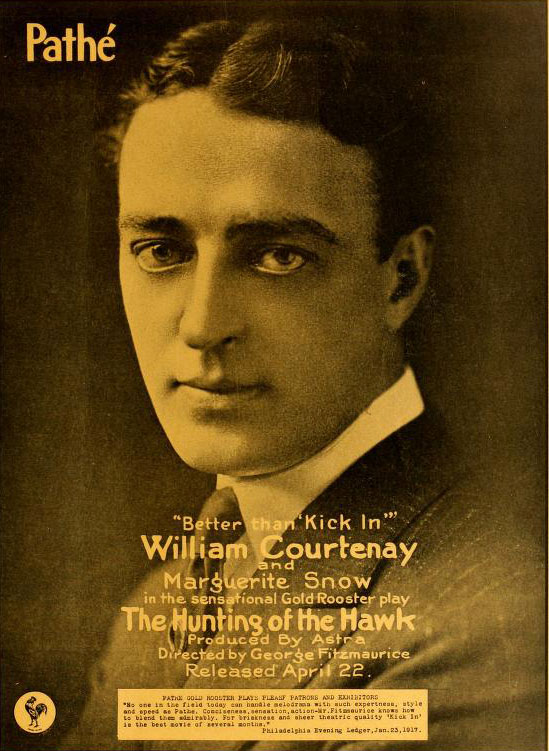
- Theatrical release poster
- Directed by: George Fitzmaurice
- Written by: George B. Seitz
- Starring: William Courtenay
- Cinematography: Arthur C. Miller
- Production company: Astra Film
- Distributed by: Pathé Exchange
- Release date: April 22, 1917
- Running time: 50 minutes
- Country: United States
- Language: Silent (English intertitles)

The Hunting of the Hawk is a 1917 American silent mystery film directed by George Fitzmaurice and starring William Courtenay. It was produced by Astra Film and distributed by Pathé Exchange.

== Cast ==
- William Courtenay as Desselway
- Marguerite Snow as Diana Curran
- Robert Clugston as Wrenshaw

== Preservation ==
It is an incomplete surviving film with reels in the Library of Congress and Library and Archives Canada. Two reels were found in the Dawson Film Find in 1978.
