= The Profiteers =

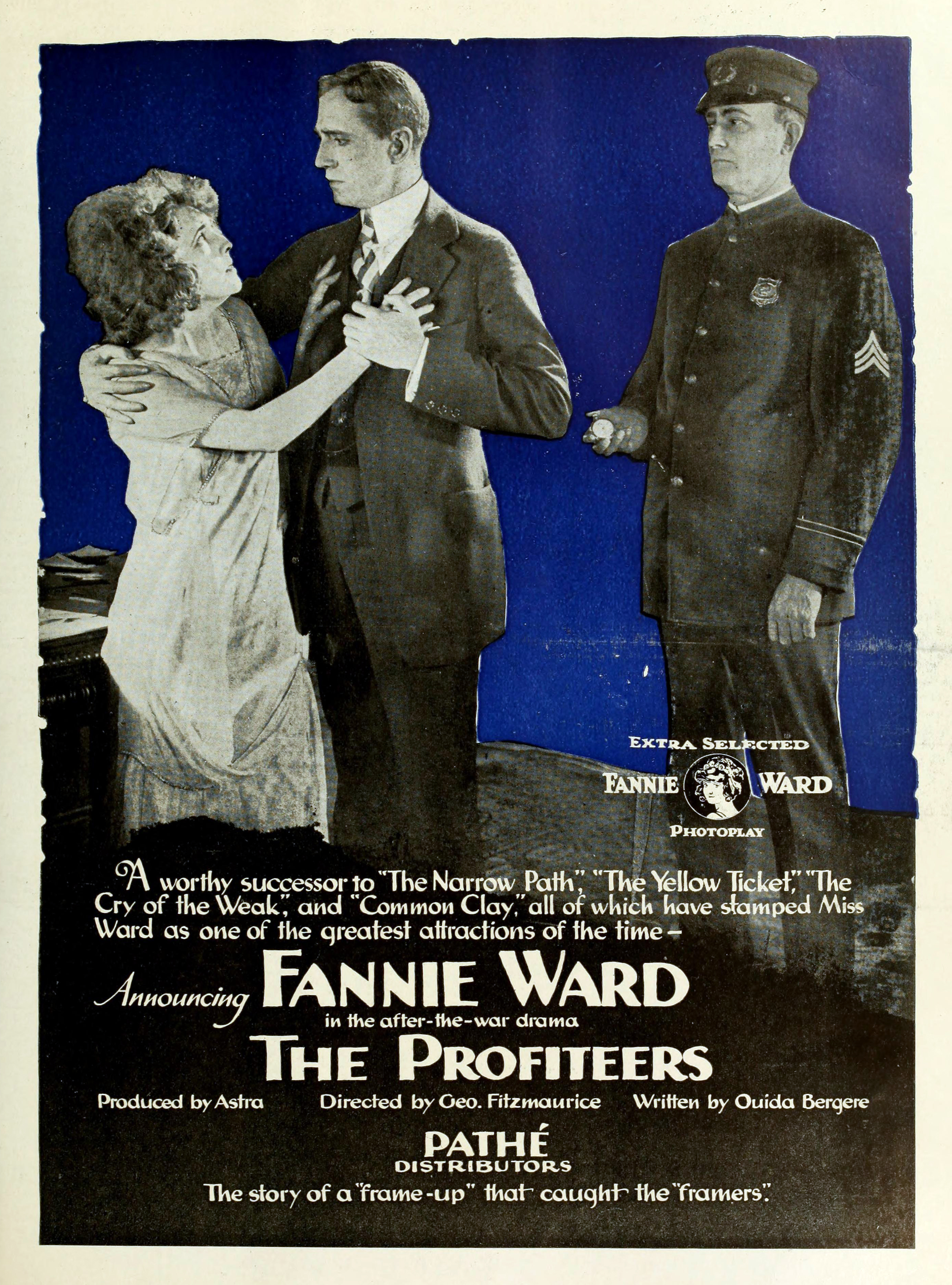
- Ad for the film from a 1919 issue of Moving Picture World
- Directed by: George Fitzmaurice
- Written by: Ouida Bergère
- Starring: Fannie Ward
- Cinematography: Arthur C. Miller (as A.C. Miller)
- Production company: Astra Film Corp.
- Distributed by: Pathé Exchange
- Release date: June 29, 1919
- Running time: 50 minutes
- Country: USA
- Languages: Silent; English titles

The Profiteers is a 1919 American silent drama film directed by George Fitzmaurice and starring Fannie Ward. It was produced by Astra Film Corp. and released through Pathé Exchange.

== Cast ==
- Fannie Ward - Beverly Randall
- John Miltern - Richard Randall
- Leslie Stuart - Tony Terle
- Edwin Stevens - Everett Dearing

== Preservation ==
With no prints of The Profiteers located in any film archives, it is considered a lost film. In February 2021, the film was cited by the National Film Preservation Board on their Lost U.S. Silent Feature Films list.
