= William Courtenay (actor) =

American stage and film actor (1875–1933)

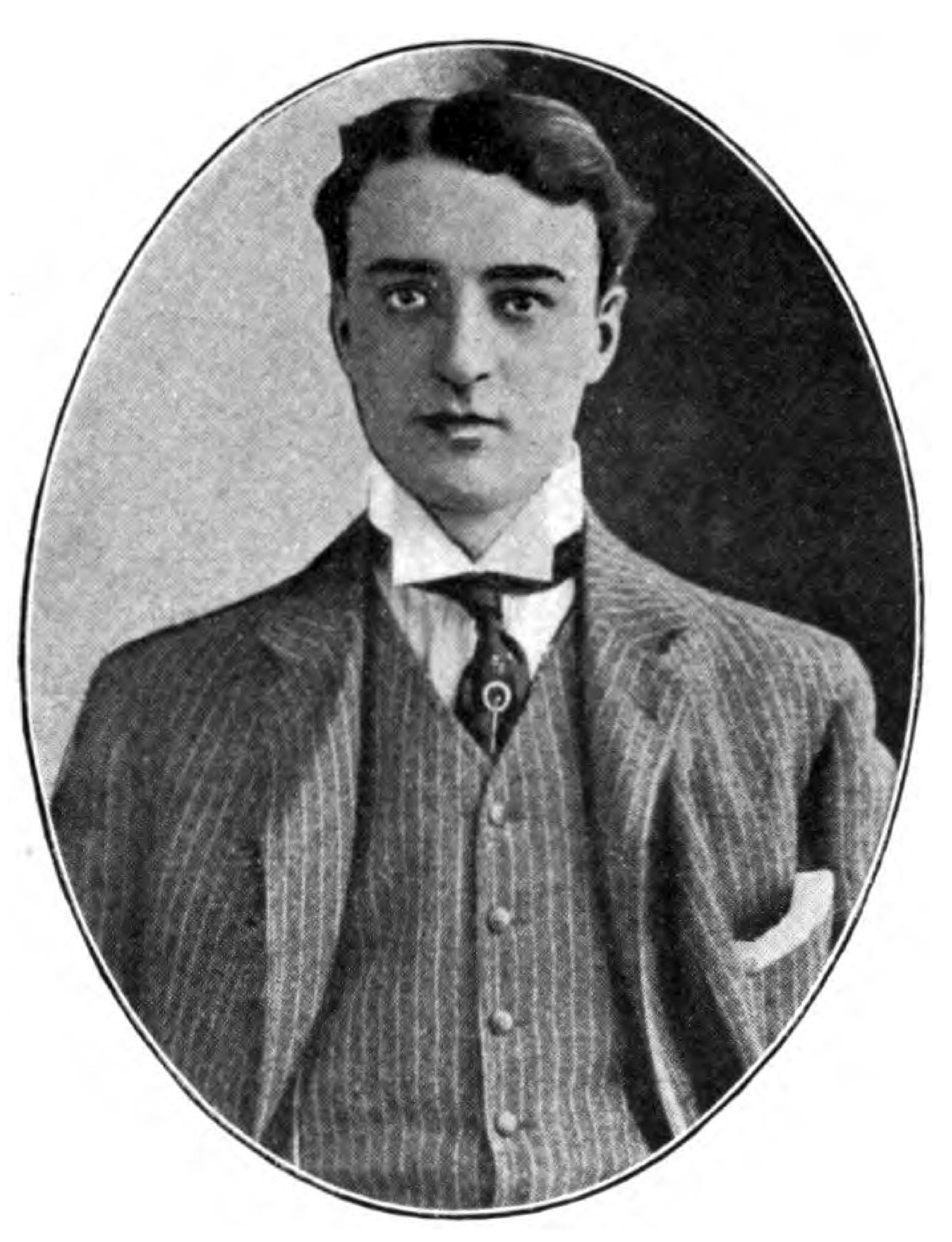
- Born: William Hancock Kelly; June 19, 1875; Worcester, Massachusetts
- Died: April 20, 1933 (aged 57); Rye, New York
- Occupation: Actor
- Years active: 1894-1930
- Spouse: Virginia Harned

William Courtenay (June 19, 1875 – April 20, 1933) was a noted Broadway star and later film actor. He was born William Hancock Kelly. At age 19 in 1894, before his Broadway career took off, Courtenay appeared in Alexander Black's slide show Miss Jerry. This was a sort of alternative entertainment to a new device by Thomas Edison called a Kinetoscope à la moving pictures.

== Broadway ==
A tall, handsome leading man Courtenay appeared in plays with Richard Mansfield, e.g., a revival of Beau Brummel and the American premiere of Cyrano de Bergerac as well as productions produced by Charles Frohman. An early important Frohman production from 1902 was Oscar Wilde's The Importance of Being Earnest his costars being Charles Richman, Margaret Anglin and Margaret Dale. For three years after 1902 he appeared as leading man in plays starring Virginia Harned the ex-wife of E. H. Sothern and seven years Courtenay's senior. They married around 1905 and Courtenay continued being a popular leading man on Broadway. Virginia Harned largely retired from acting after one or two more plays to be Mrs. William Courtenay. They had no children. In 1913 he was chosen for the lead in Romance by Edward Sheldon and starring Doris Keane in the role of a lifetime. The lead role in this soon to be famous and very long running play made Courtenay more famous. Sheldon had originally offered the part to his friend actor John Barrymore who declined and later regretted it. Keane and Courtenay performed the play over a thousand performances.

== Motion pictures ==
In 1915 and some twenty years after Miss Jerry, Courtenay began appearing in silent films. Still handsome and quite famous as an actor he worked for such studios as William A. Brady's World Pictures, Vitagraph and most of all Pathe. For the next fifteen years he appeared alternatively in plays and motion pictures. His first of five sound films, Evidence for Warner Brothers, is lost. His penultimate sound film Three Faces East with Constance Bennett is restored and on Warner on-demand DVD.

== Death ==
William Courtenay died in Rye, New York on April 20, 1933. His widow Virginia died in 1946.

== Filmography ==
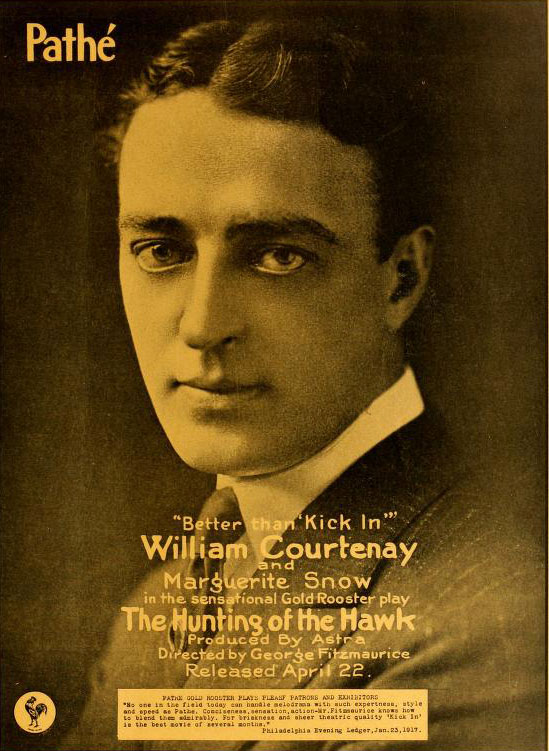
The Hunting of the Hawk (1917)

- Miss Jerry (1894) (*more slide show than motion picture)
- The Whole Dam Family and the Dam Dog (1905)
- Sealed Lips (1915)
- The Island of Surprise (1916)
- The Romantic Journey (1916)
- The Nintety and Nine (1916)
- Kick In (1917)
- The Hunting of the Hawk (1917)
- The Recoil (1917)
- The Inner Ring (1919) (*short)
- Evidence (1929)
- The Show of Shows (1929)
- The Sacred Flame (1929)
- Three Faces East (1930)
- The Way of All Men (1930)
