= At Bay =

1915 film by George Fitzmaurice

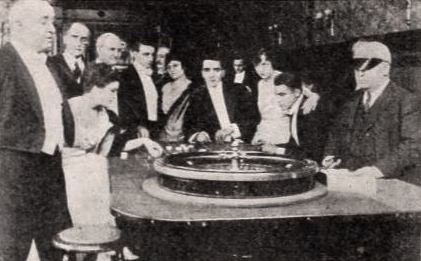
- Film still printed in a 1922 issue of Exhibitors Herald
- Directed by: George Fitzmaurice
- Written by: Ouida Bergere
- Based on: At Bay by George Scarborough
- Produced by: Astra Film Company, Pathe Freres
- Starring: Florence Reed; Frank Sheridan
- Cinematography: Arthur C. Miller
- Production companies: Astra Film; Pathé Freres
- Distributed by: Pathé Exchange
- Release date: November 26, 1915
- Running time: 50 minutes
- Country: United States
- Language: Silent (English intertitles)

At Bay is a 1915 American silent drama film directed by George Fitzmaurice and starring Florence Reed. It is based on a 1913 Broadway play, At Bay, by George Scarborough and produced by the Shuberts. On stage, Reed's starring part was played by Chrystal Herne.

The play was adapted for the screen by Ouida Bergère.

== Cast ==
- Florence Reed as Aline Graham
- Frank Sheridan as District Attorney Graham
- Lyster Chambers as Joe Hunter
- DeWitt Jennings as Judson Flagg (credited as De Witt C. Jennings)
- Charles Waldron as Captain Holbrook
- Richard Taber

== Preservation ==
At Bay is currently presumed lost. In February of 2021, the film was cited by the National Film Preservation Board on their Lost U.S. Silent Feature Films list.
