= The Cheat (1923 film) =

1923 film by George Fitzmaurice

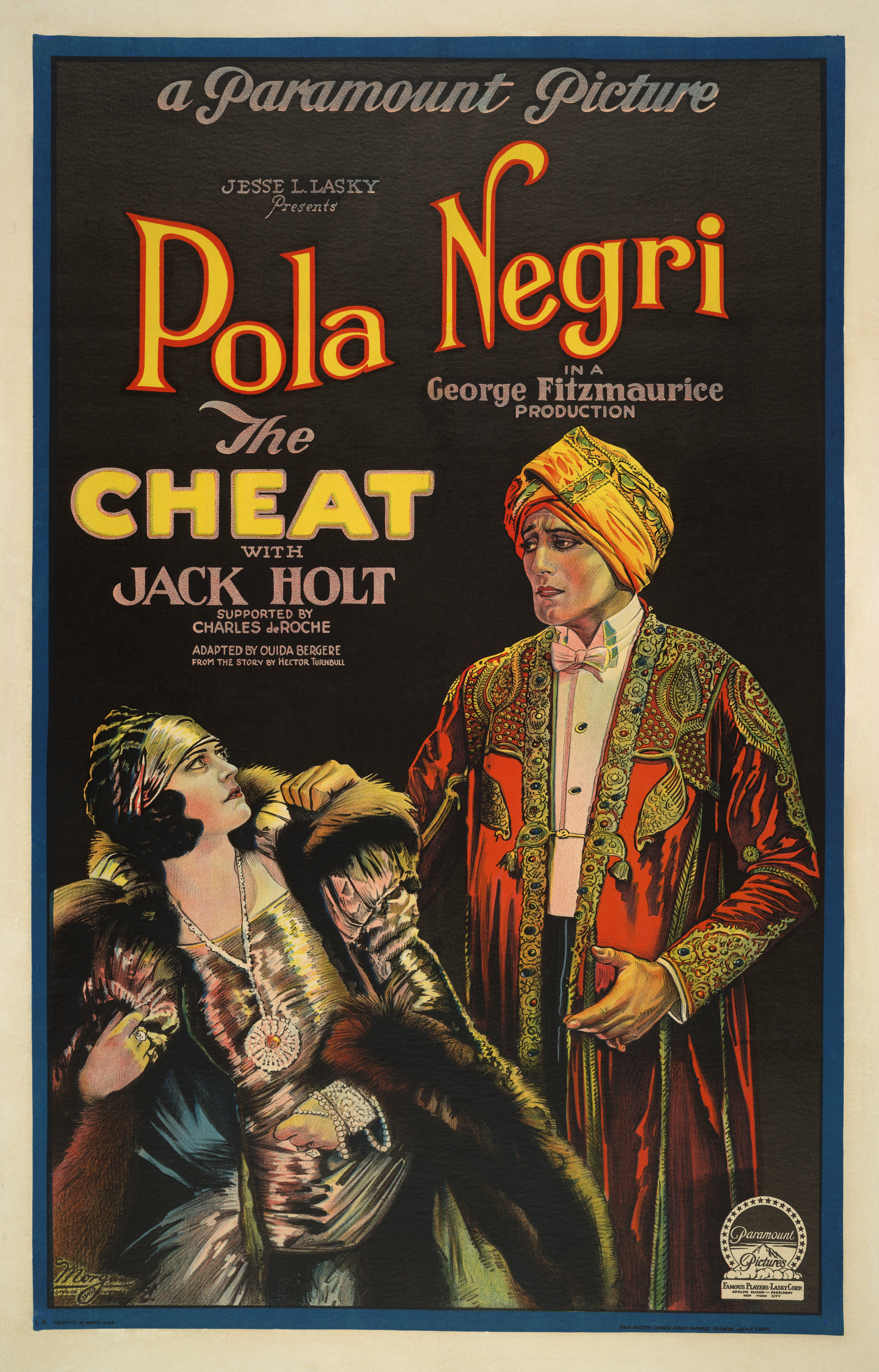
- Directed by: George Fitzmaurice
- Written by: Hector Turnbull (scenario); Jeanie MacPherson (scenario); Ouida Bergère (adaptation)
- Produced by: Adolph Zukor; Jesse L. Lasky; George Fitzmaurice
- Starring: Pola Negri; Jack Holt
- Cinematography: Arthur C. Miller
- Distributed by: Paramount Pictures
- Release date: August 27, 1923
- Running time: 8 reels (2232.05 meters)
- Country: United States
- Language: Silent (English intertitles)

The Cheat is a 1923 American silent drama film produced by Famous Players–Lasky and distributed by Paramount Pictures, and is a remake of Cecil B. DeMille's 1915 film of the same name using the same script by Hector Turnbull and Jeanie MacPherson. This version stars Pola Negri and was directed by George Fitzmaurice.

== Plot ==
As described in a film magazine review, Carmelita De Cordoba a beautiful young South American woman who has been betrothed by her stern father to Don Pablo, whom she despises, meets and falls in love with Dudley Drake, a New York City broker, while in Paris. Claude Mace, an art swindler masquerading as East Indian Prince Rao-Singh, hopes to marry her for her wealth. Carmelita elopes with Dudley and is disinherited. The Prince, after lending her some money, induces her to dine alone with him. Meanwhile Dudley makes a fortune. Carmelita and the Prince quarrel and she shoots him. Dudley, arriving on the scene, takes responsibility for the crime. He is convicted. Carmelita goes to the court and confesses, showing a brand on her shoulder that is the Prince's work. The verdict is set aside and all is rosy.

== Cast ==
- Pola Negri as Carmelita De Cordoba
- Jack Holt as Dudley Drake
- Charles de Rochefort as Claude Mace a/k/a Prince Rao-Singh (credited as Charles De Roche)
- Dorothy Cumming as Lucy Hodge
- Robert Schable as Jack Hodge
- Charles A. Stevenson as Horace Drake
- Helen Dunbar as Duenna
- Richard Wayne as Defense Attorney
- Guy Oliver as District Attorney
- Edward Kimball as Judge
- Charles Farrell in a bit part (uncredited)

== Preservation status ==
With no prints of The Cheat located in any film archives, it is a lost film. However, this particular film was adapted into a novel in the same year of 1923, written by Paramount Pictures employee Russell Holman. That novel survived and could be used to extrapolate the film's plot.
