= The Iron Heart (1917 film) =

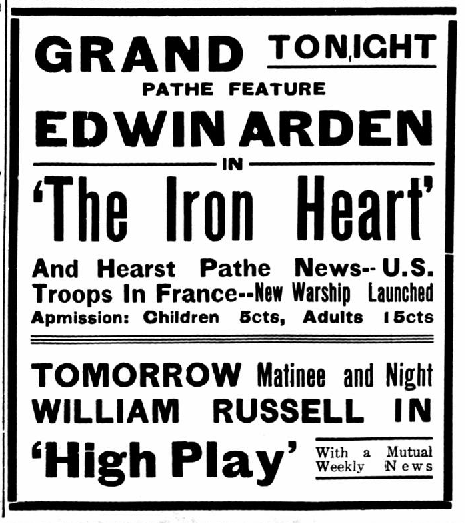
- Newspaper ad for the film from a 1917 issue of The Bemidji Daily Pioneer
- Directed by: George Fitzmaurice
- Written by: Ouida Bergère
- Starring: Edwin Arden
- Cinematography: Arthur C. Miller
- Production company: Astra Film Corp
- Distributed by: Pathé Exchange
- Release date: May 27, 1917
- Running time: 50 mins.
- Country: USA
- Language: Silent...English titles

The Iron Heart is a 1917 American silent drama film directed by George Fitzmaurice. It was produced by Astra Film Company and distributed by Pathé Exchange.

== Cast ==
- Edwin Arden as Stephen Martin
- Forrest Winant as Tom Martin
- Helene Chadwick as Grace
- Leonore Harris as Anne Parbell
- Gertrude Berkeley as Mrs. Martin

== Preservation ==
With no prints of The Iron Heart located in any film archives, it is considered a lost film. In February 2021, the film was cited by the National Film Preservation Board on their Lost U.S. Silent Feature Films list.
