= The Recoil (1917 film) =

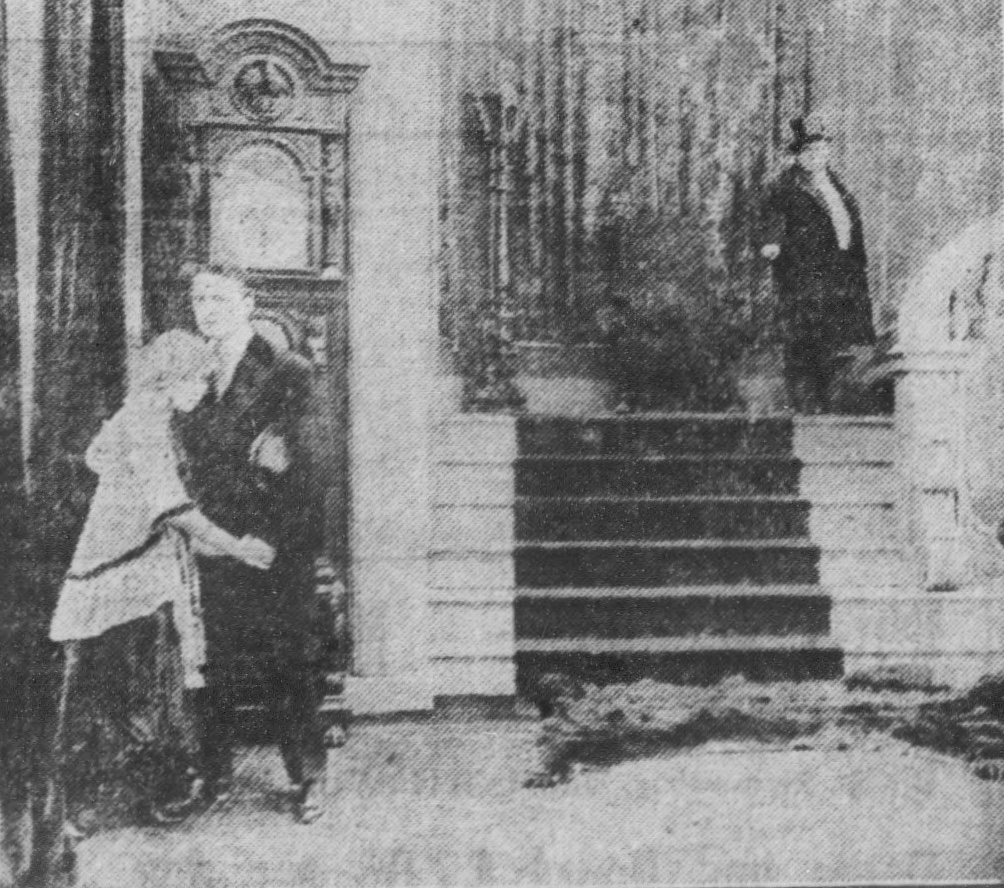
- Scene from the film
- Directed by: George Fitzmaurice
- Written by: Anthony Paul Kelly
- Produced by: Astra Film Co.
- Starring: William Courtenay
- Cinematography: Arthur C. Miller
- Distributed by: Pathé Exchange
- Release date: May 13, 1917
- Running time: 50 minutes
- Country: USA
- Language: Silent ..English titles

The Recoil is a 1917 American silent drama film directed by George Fitzmaurice and starring William Courtenay. It was released through the Pathé Exchange company. It was filmed on the East Coast at Jersey City, New Jersey.

An incomplete print survives in the Library of Congress collection. Reel 1 is missing. Prints and/or fragments were found in the Dawson Film Find in 1978.

== Cast ==
- William Courtenay as Richard Cameron
- Lilian Greuze as Marian Somerset
- Frank Belcher as Charles Van Horn
- Dora Mills Adams as Mrs. Somerset
- William Raymond as Page Somerset
