= The Test (1916 film) =

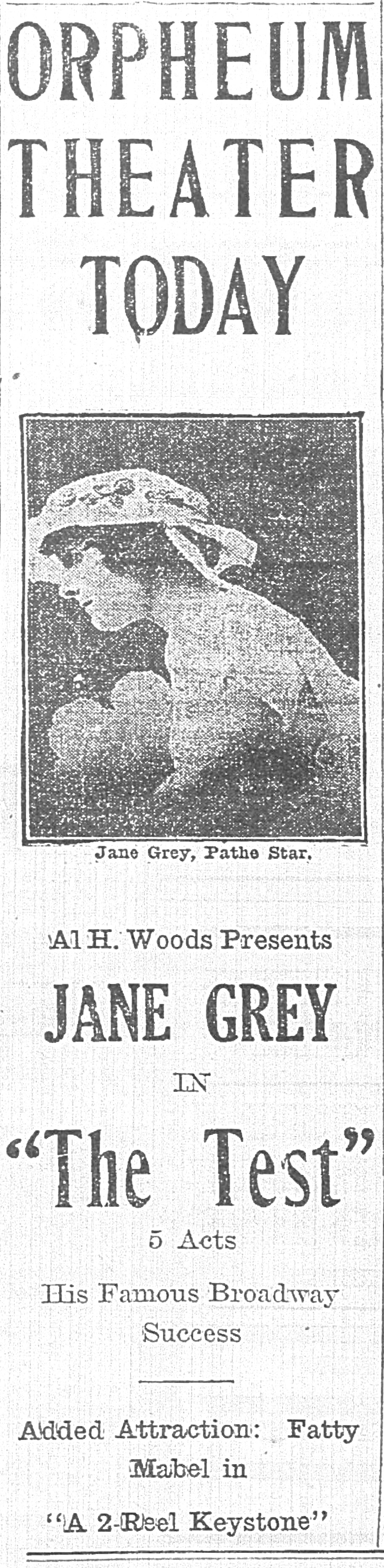
- Newspaper advertisement
- Directed by: George Fitzmaurice
- Written by: R.E. McGlinn (play); J. Quinlan (play)
- Starring: Jane Grey; Lumsden Hare; Claude Fleming
- Cinematography: Arthur C. Miller
- Production company: Astra Film
- Distributed by: Pathé Exchange
- Release date: September 18, 1916
- Running time: 50 minutes
- Country: United States
- Languages: Silent; English intertitles

The Test is a 1916 American silent drama film directed by George Fitzmaurice and starring Jane Grey, Lumsden Hare and Claude Fleming.

The film adapts a play by J. Quinlan.

A print of this five-reel film exists at the Cinémathèque française.

== Cast ==
- Jane Grey as Emma Tretman
- Lumsden Hare as Arthur Thome
- Claude Fleming as Freddie Wayne
- Carl Harbaugh as Richard Tretman
- Inez Buck as Thome's Sister
- Ida Darling

== Other ==
The film is not to be confused with Rawdon Blandford's The Test (also 1916), a lost film.

== Bibliography ==
- James Robert Parish & Michael R. Pitts. Film directors: a guide to their American films. Scarecrow Press, 1974.
