= On the Level (1917 film) =

1917 film

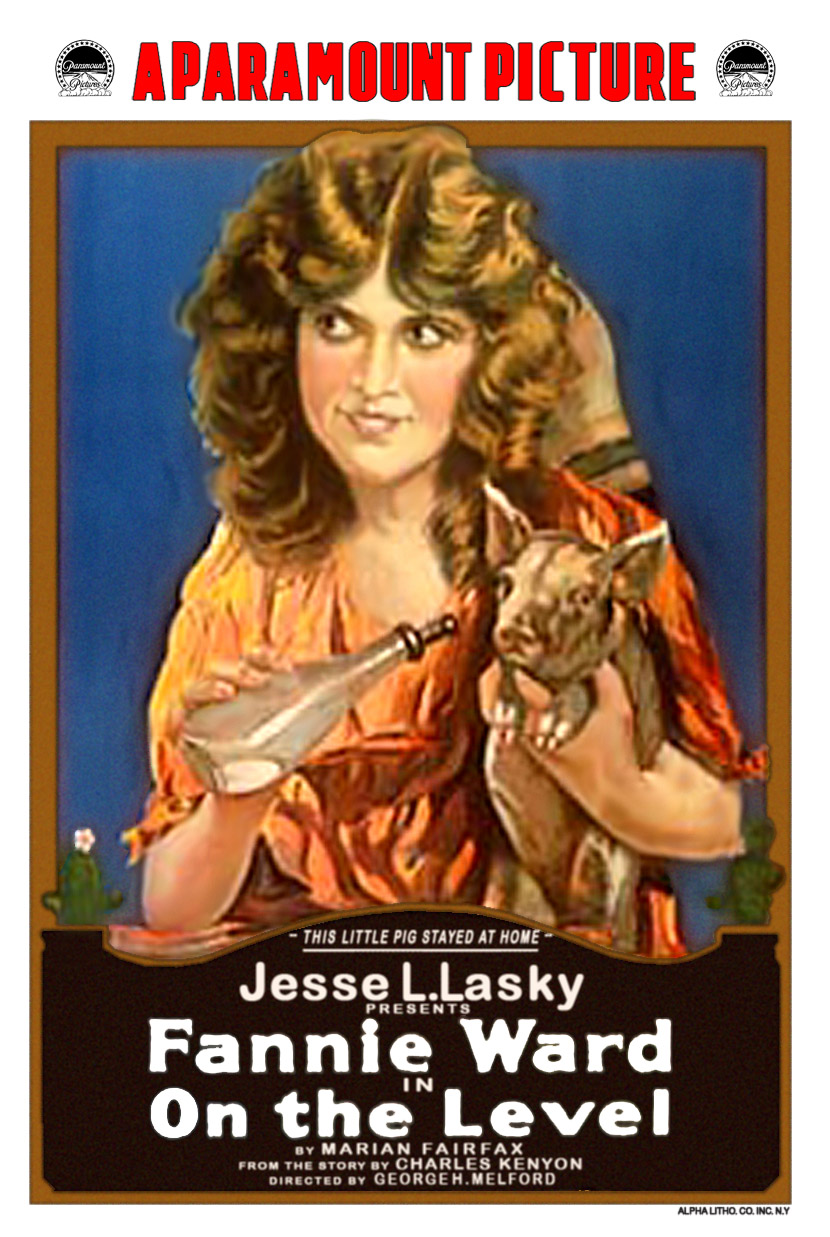
- Theatrical release poster
- Directed by: George Melford
- Screenplay by: Marion Fairfax; Charles Kenyon
- Produced by: Jesse L. Lasky
- Starring: Fannie Ward; Jack Dean; Harrison Ford; Lottie Pickford; James Cruze; Jim Mason
- Cinematography: Percy Hilburn (French)
- Production company: Jesse L. Lasky Feature Play Company
- Distributed by: Paramount Pictures
- Release date: September 10, 1917
- Running time: 50 minutes
- Country: United States
- Languages: Silent; English intertitles

On the Level is a lost 1917 American silent Western film directed by George Melford and written by Marion Fairfax and Charles Kenyon. The film stars Fannie Ward, Jack Dean, Harrison Ford, Lottie Pickford, James Cruze, and Jim Mason. The film was released on September 10, 1917, by Paramount Pictures.

== Plot ==
As described in a film magazine, Merlin, the only daughter of a sheep rancher, is kidnapped by Sontag, who shoots her father and drives off the sheep. She is compelled to dance nightly in Sontag's saloon where she is known as Mexicali Mae. There she meets Joe Blanchard, a derelict from the east who plays the piano in order to secure enough dope to satisfy his craving. Sontag, fearing that one of his confederates has double crossed him and told about his opium smuggling operations, kills the man and places the blame on Joe. Merlin helps Joe escape, and they take up a ranch where Joe finally overcomes his desire for drugs. Joe's mother and fiancée pay a visit and Mrs. Chapman tries to buy off Merlin and have Joe return east. Merlin returns to Sontag's dance hall, and Joe follows, convinced that she no longer loves him. Merlin returns to the ranch and is about to end her own life when Joe and Sontag arrive. In the tussle that follows, Sontag is killed and Joe realizes that Merlin really loves him.

== Cast ==
- Fannie Ward as Merlin Warner
- Jack Dean as Pete Sontag
- Harrison Ford as Joe Blanchard
- Lottie Pickford as Eleanore Duke
- James Cruze as Ozmun
- Jim Mason as Pike
- James Neill as Warner
- Edythe Chapman as Joe Blanchard's Mother
- Jane Wolfe as Sontag's Wife
- Henry Woodward as Judge Wilton

== Reception ==
Like many American films of the time, On the Level was subject to cuts by city and state film censorship boards. The Chicago Board of Censors required a cut of the scene of a roulette wheel, man shooting girl's father, the intertitle "A little this side of hell", all tough dance scenes, tough dancing, two views of roulette wheel, flash first dead body scene and cut two others, flash scene of dragging body across floor, body in wheel barrow, three intertitles "I'm going to town, I'd rather die with morphine than without it", "You didn't say anything to your mother about me?", and "I understand", two tough dancing scenes, all scenes of selling liquor to sailor, two scenes of drinking at table in background, and girl on table with arms above man's neck.
