= Stuart Heisler =

American film and television director

- Born: December 5, 1896; Los Angeles, California
- Died: August 21, 1979 (aged 82); San Diego, California
- Occupations: Film director, film editor

Stuart Heisler (December 5, 1896 – August 21, 1979) was an American film and television director. He was a son of Luther Albert Heisler (1855–1916), a carpenter, and Frances Baldwin Heisler (1857–1935). He worked as a motion picture editor from 1921 to 1936, then worked as a film director for the rest of his career.

Heisler directed the 1944 propaganda film The Negro Soldier, a documentary-style recruitment piece aimed at getting African-Americans to enlist in the U.S. military during World War II. He found commercial and critical success in the late forties directing Susan Hayward in two of her breakthrough performances.

He received an Oscar nomination in 1949 for his contribution to the visual effects of the film Tulsa.

== Partial filmography ==
=== As editor ===
- The Love Light (1921)
- They Shall Pay (1921)
- Cytherea (1924)
- Tarnish (1924)
- The Silent Stranger (1924)
- In Hollywood with Potash and Perlmutter (1924)
- Stella Dallas (1925)
- Lady Be Good (1928)
- Three-Ring Marriage (1928)
- Hard to Get (1929)
- Raffles (1930)
- Whoopee! (1930)
- The Kid from Spain (1932)
- The Masquerader (1933)
- Roman Scandals (1933)
- Kid Millions (1934)
- We're Not Dressing (1934)
- The Wedding Night (1935)
- Peter Ibbetson (1935)
- Klondike Annie (1936)
- Poppy (1936)
- The Big Broadcast of 1937 (1936)

=== As director ===
- Straight from the Shoulder (1936)
- The Hurricane (1937)
- The Biscuit Eater (1940)
- The Monster and the Girl (1941)
- Among the Living (1941)
- The Glass Key (1942)
- The Remarkable Andrew (1942)
- The Negro Soldier (1944)
- Along Came Jones (1945)
- Blue Skies (1946)
- Smash-Up, the Story of a Woman (1947)
- Tulsa (1949)
- Tokyo Joe (1949)
- Chain Lightning (1950)
- Dallas (1950)
- Storm Warning (1951)
- Journey into Light (1951)
- Saturday Island (1952)
- The Star (1952)
- Beachhead (1954)
- This Is My Love (1954)
- I Died a Thousand Times (1955)
- The Lone Ranger (1956)
- The Burning Hills (1956)
- Hitler (1962)

== See also ==
- 22nd Academy Awards
