= Fannie Ward =

American actress (1872–1952)

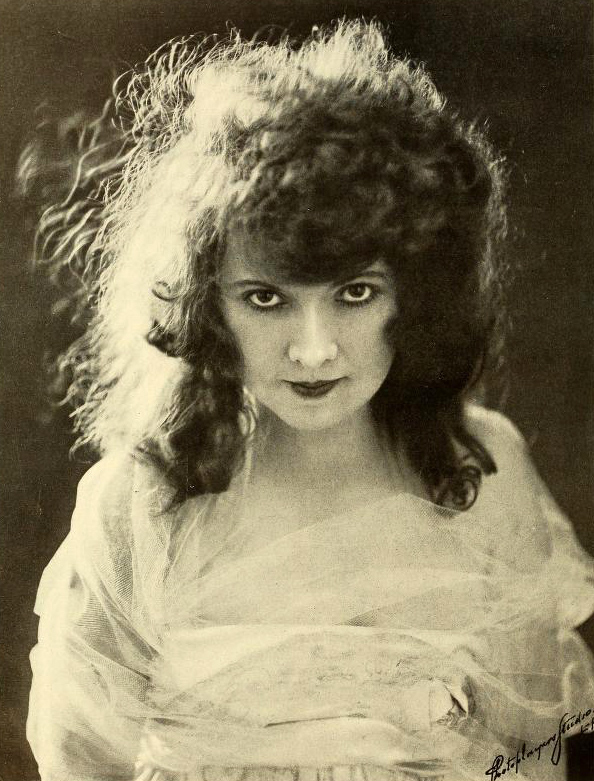
- Ward in 1917
- Born: Fannie Buchanan; February 22, 1872; St. Louis, Missouri, U.S.
- Died: January 27, 1952 (aged 79); New York City, U.S.
- Occupation: Actress
- Years active: 1890–1898, 1905–1952
- Spouses: Joseph Lewis (m. 1898; div. 1914) John Wooster Dean (m. 1915; died 1950)
- Children: Dorothé Mabel Lewis

Fannie Ward (born Fannie Buchanan; February 22, 1872 – January 27, 1952), also credited as Fanny Ward, was an American actress of stage and screen. Known for performing in both comedic and dramatic roles, she was cast in The Cheat, a sexually charged 1915 silent film directed by Cecil B. DeMille. Reportedly, Ward's ageless appearance helped her to achieve and maintain her celebrity. In its obituary for her, The New York Times describes her as "an actress who never quite reached the top in her profession ... [and who] tirelessly devoted herself to appearing perpetually youthful, an act that made her famous".

== Early life and stage career ==
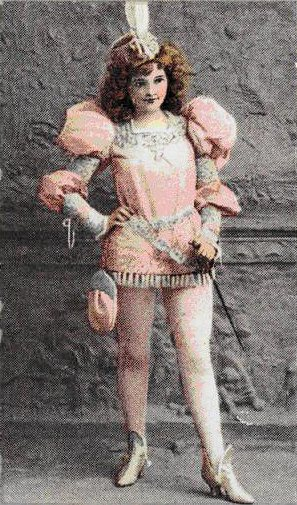
Ward, c. 1884-1890

Born in St. Louis, Missouri, Ward was the only daughter of Eliza and John Buchanan, who was a dry goods merchant. She had one sibling, a brother, Benton.

In 1890, "against the wishes of her parents", Ward made her stage debut as Cupid in Pippino with vaudevillian star Eddie Foy. She soon became a success in 10 stage productions in New York City before sailing in 1894 to London, where she performed in The Shop Girl. Her performances there led critics to compare Ward favorably to actress Maude Adams. In 1898 she married a wealthy diamond merchant and retired from the stage. Ward resumed her career in 1905 after her husband suffered severe business losses that left him, according to news reports, "practically penniless". In April 1907, she returned to the Broadway stage to perform in A Marriage of Reason at the Wallack's Theatre. She was then cast two years later in another Broadway production, The New Lady Bantock; and after its run at Wallack's, she and other cast members took the play on tour to various cities during the latter half of 1909. Yet another popular Broadway play in which she performed was the comedy Madam President, which was presented at the Garrick Theatre from September 1913 to January 1914.

== Film ==
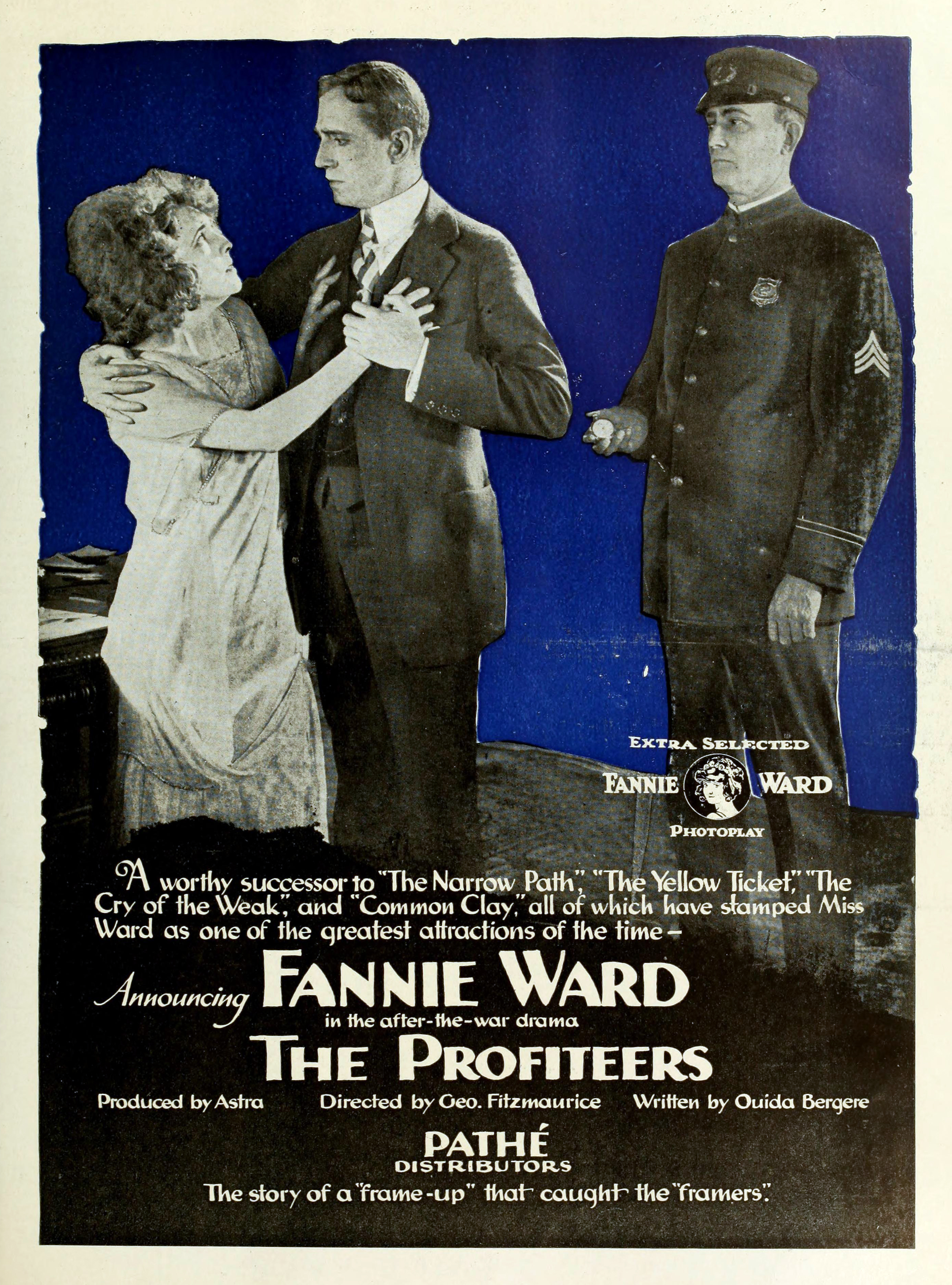
The Profiteers (1919)

In 1915, around the time Ward's stage career was waning, American movie producer and director Cecil B. DeMille convinced her to perform in The Cheat, a silent film melodrama co-starring Japanese actor Sessue Hayakawa. The film proved to be a sensation due to its plot mingling of racial and sexual themes. In it Ward portrays a society woman who embezzles money and turns to an Asian ivory dealer (Hayakawa) for help, with brutal consequences. The movie launched the careers of DeMille and Hayakawa, who soon became Hollywood's first Asian star.

In addition to starring in The Hardest Way in 1921, Ward also appears in several shorts released in the 1920s: the Phonofilm short Father Time (1924) in which she sings; another Phonofilm production, The Perennial Flapper (1924); and in the Vitaphone short The Miracle Woman (1929).

In 1926, trading on her ever-youthful public image, Ward opened a Paris beauty shop, "The Fountain of Youth".

== Personal life and death ==
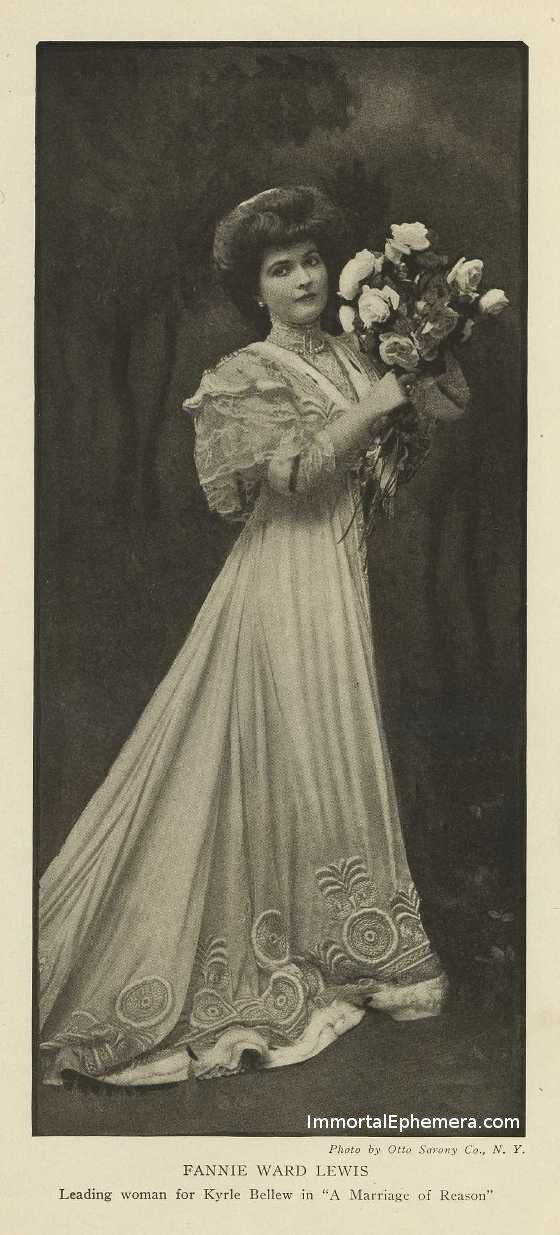
Ward in Burr McIntosh Monthly, July 1907

Fannie Ward was married twice. Her first husband was Joseph Lewis, a British money lender and diamond dealer. They married in 1898. In 1909, in an interview with newspaper reporter Marguerite Martyn, Ward stated, "My husband hates my work", and then she questioned why women are treated differently than men professionally:

He wouldn't speak to me for six months after I returned to the stage. But as for my duty, there are men of leisure who have indulgences, who give up half their time to sport or travel or study or research in some favorite art or science, so why shouldn't a woman? I only ask to spend six months out of the year upon the stage.

On January 14, 1913, less than four years after the noted interview, Ward and Lewis divorced. The following year she married her second husband, John Wooster Dean (born John H. Donovan, 1874–1950), an actor who had frequently co-starred with her on stage and in films.

Ward's only child, Dorothé Mabel Lewis (1900–1938), was the result of an affair with the Viscount Castlereagh, who in 1915 became The Most Hon. The 7th Marquess of Londonderry (1878–1949), an Anglo-Irish aristocrat from Ulster. She married firstly, in 1917, RAF Captain Isaac Henry Woolf ("Jack") Barnato (1894–1918), son of the diamond and gold mining entrepreneur Barney Barnato and secondly to Terence Conyngham Plunket, 6th Baron Plunket, and had three sons. She and her husband were killed in a plane crash due to heavy fog.

On January 21, 1952, at age 79, Ward suffered a stroke in her Park Avenue apartment and was found unconscious by a neighbor. She remained in a coma until her death six days later at Lenox Hill Hospital. The New York Times reported that Ward died without a will and left an estate with an estimated value of $40,000. The newspaper also reported that she was survived by "three English grandsons": Lord Patrick Plunket, the Hon. Shaun Plunket, and the Hon. Robin Plunket.

== Filmography ==
Year	Title	Role	Notes
1915	The Marriage of Kitty	Katherine "Kitty" Silverton	Lost film
1915	The Cheat	Edith Hardy	
1916	Tennessee's Pardner	Tennessee	
1916	For the Defense	Fidele Roget	
1916	A Gutter Magdalene	Maida Carrington	Lost film
1916	Each Pearl a Tear	Diane Winston, aka Each Hour a Pearl	USA: alternative title: Every Pearl a Tear
1916	Witchcraft	Suzette	Lost film
1916	The Years of the Locust	Lorraine Roth	
1917	Betty to the Rescue		Lost film
1917	The Winning of Sally Temple	Sally Temple	
1917	A School for Husbands	Lady Betty Manners	Lost film
1917	Unconquered	Mrs. Jackson	Lost film
1917	Her Strange Wedding	Coralie Grayson	Lost film
1917	The Crystal Gazer	Rose Jorgensen/Rose Keith/Norma Dugan	Lost film
1917	On the Level	Merlin Warner, aka Mexicali May	Lost film
1918	Innocent	Innocent	Lost film
1918	The Yellow Ticket	Anna Mirrel	Lost film
1918	A Japanese Nightingale	Yuki	
1918	The Narrow Path	Marion Clark	Lost film
1919	The Only Way		Lost film
1919	Common Clay	Ellen Neal	Lost film
1919	The Cry of the Weak	Mary Dexter	Lost film
1919	The Profiteers	Beverly Randall	Lost film
1919	Our Better Selves	Loyette Merval	Lost film
1920	Le Secret du Lone Star		
1920	La Rafale		
1924	Father Time		Short film
1924	The Perennial Flapper	The Perennial flapper"	Short film
1929	The Miracle Woman		Short film

== Gallery ==
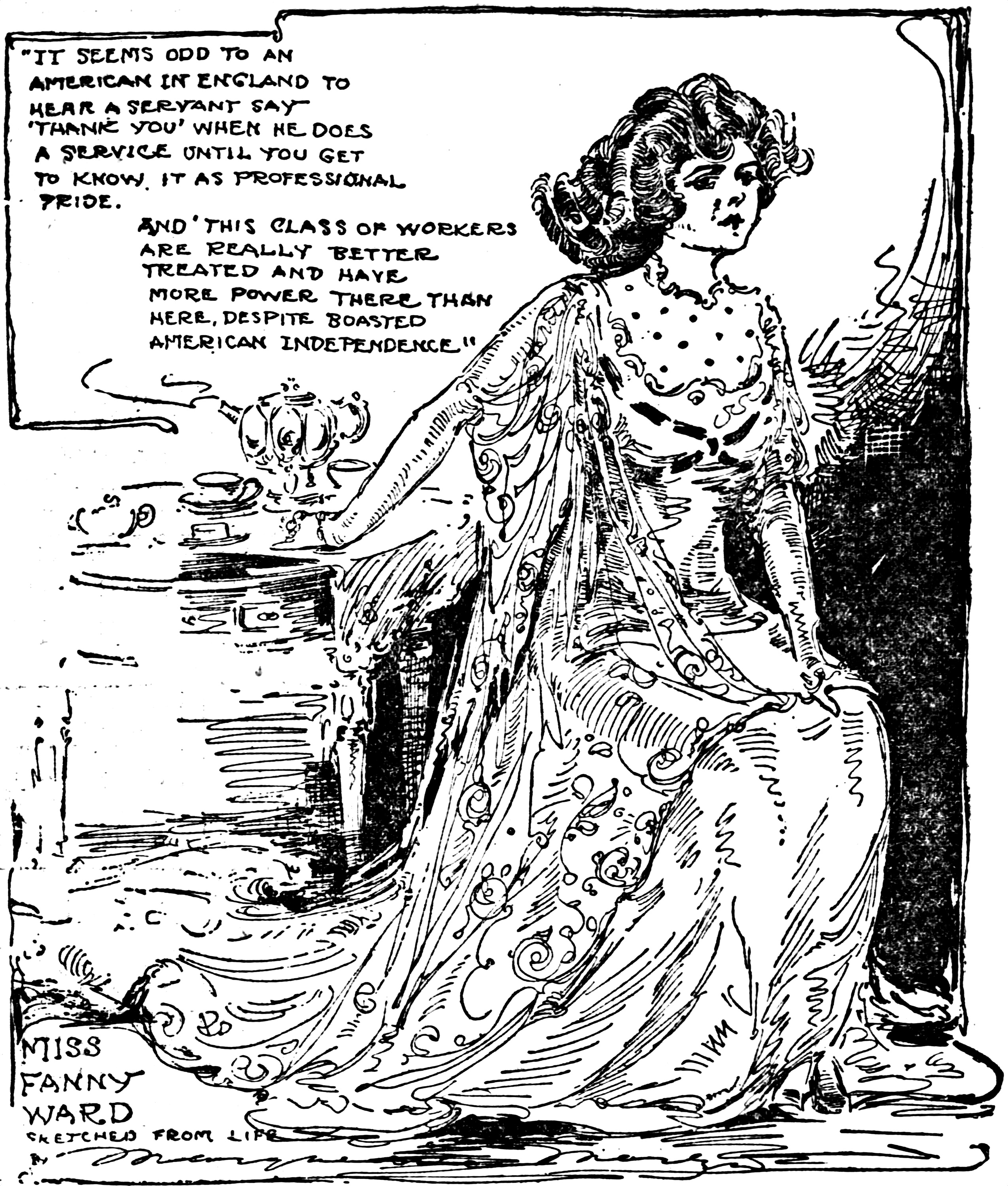
Ward sketch by journalist Marguerite Martyn, 1909

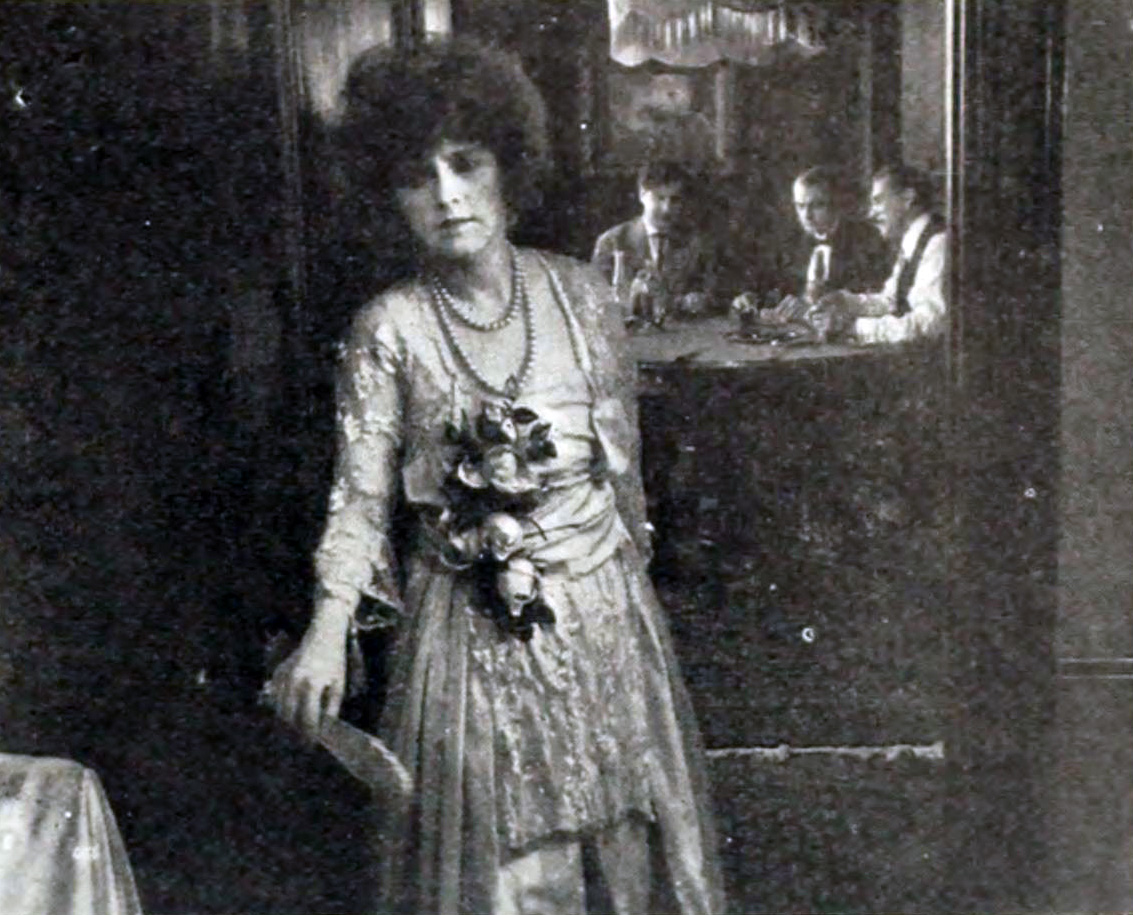
A Gutter Magdalene (1916)

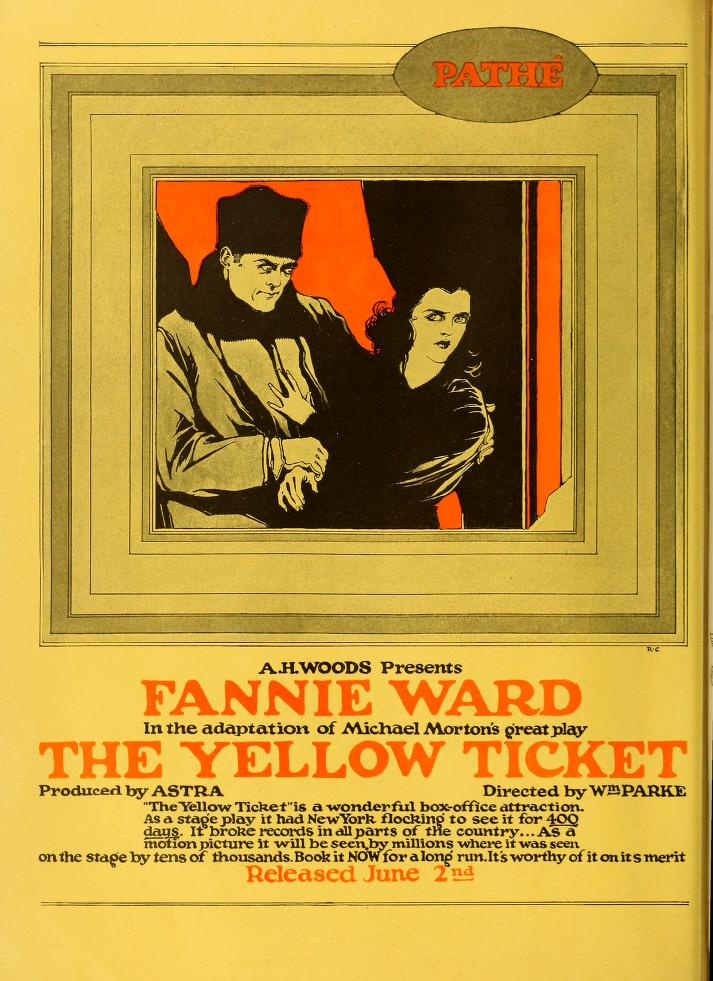
The Yellow Ticket (1918)

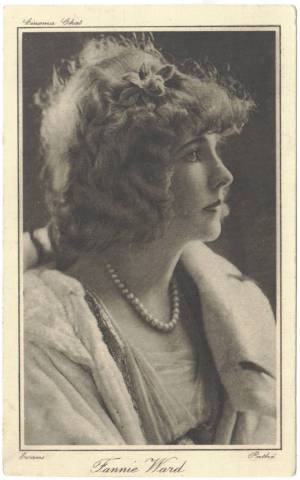
Ward, 1920

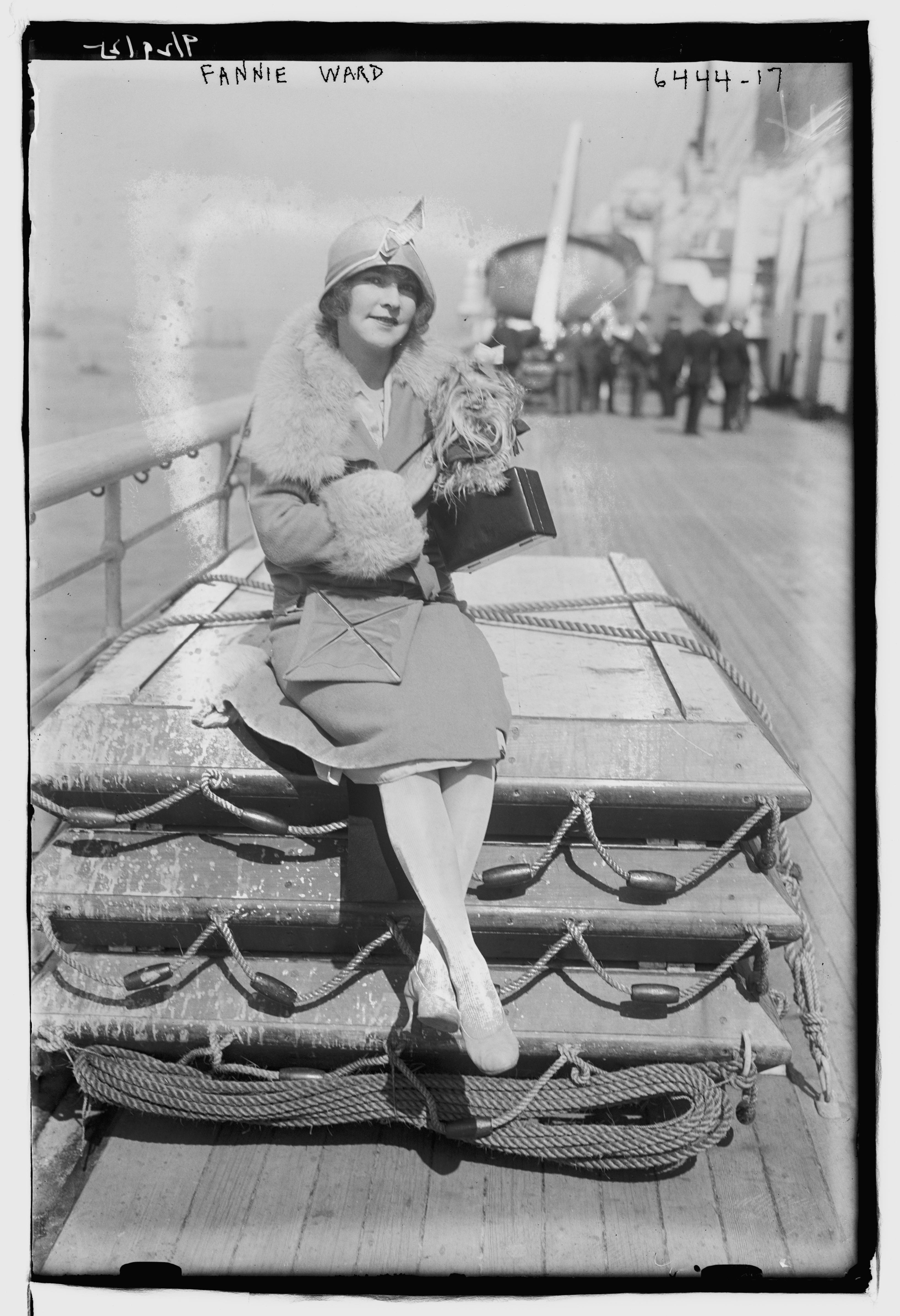
Ward, c. 1925
