= Arthur Miller (cinematographer) =

American Cinematographer (1895–1970)

Arthur Charles Miller
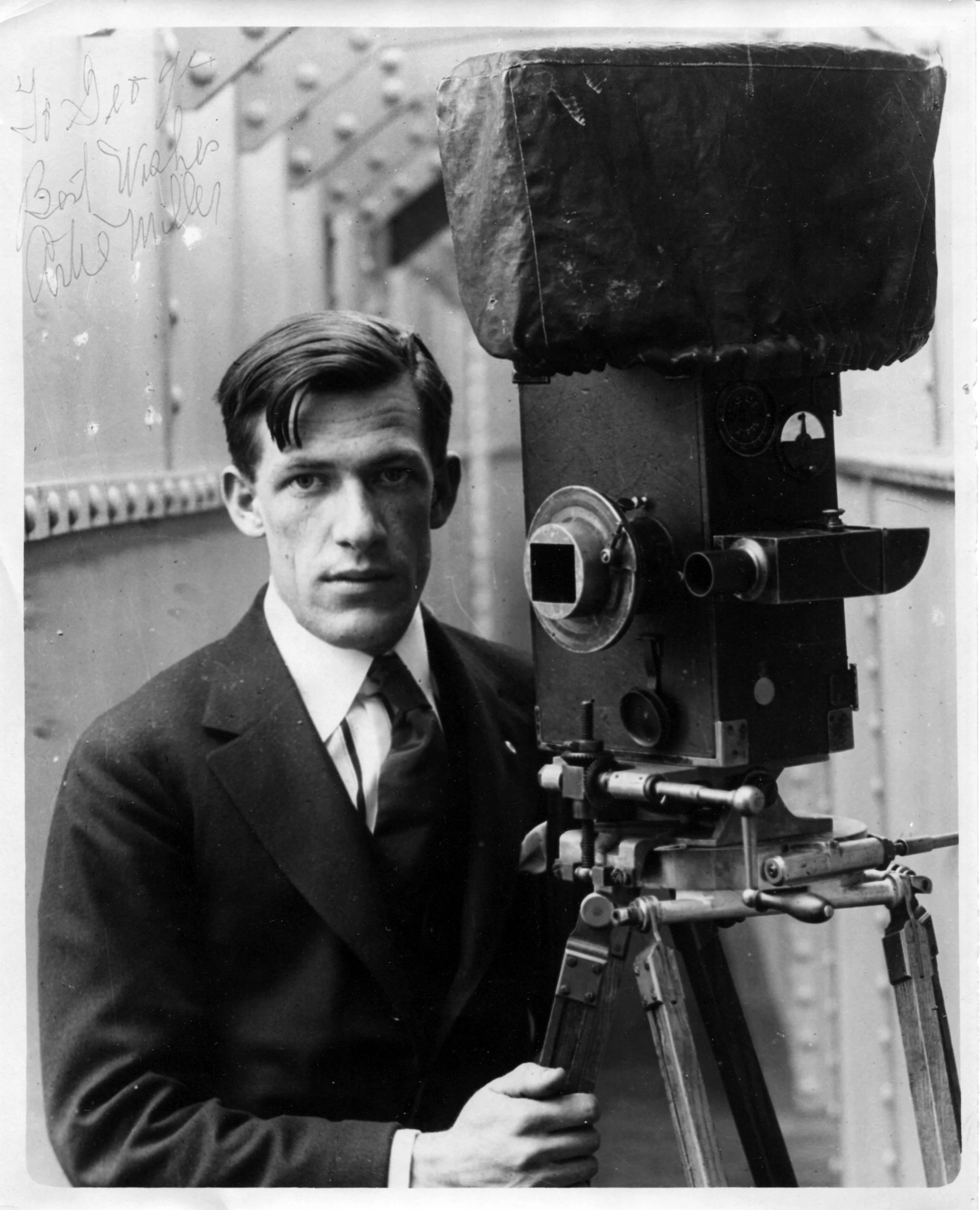
- Miller with a 1912 Pathé 35mm movie camera
- Born: Arthur Charles Miller; July 8, 1895; Roslyn, New York, US
- Died: July 13, 1970 (aged 75); Hollywood, California, US
- Occupation: Cinematographer
- Years active: 1914–1951
- Employer: Fox Film Corporation
- Board member of: American Society of Cinematographers (A.S.C.) co-founder (1919) and president (1954–1956)
- Awards: Academy Award for Best Cinematography; How Green Was My Valley (1941); The Song of Bernadette (1943); Anna and the King of Siam (1946)

Arthur Charles Miller, A.S.C. (July 8, 1895 – July 13, 1970) was an American cinematographer. He was nominated for the Oscar for Best Cinematography six times, winning three times: for How Green Was My Valley in 1941, The Song of Bernadette in 1944, and Anna and the King of Siam in 1947.

== Career ==
"The basic principle I have had in making pictures was to make them look like real life, and then emphasize the visuals slightly ... I was never a soft-focus man. I like the focus [to be] very hard. I liked crisp, hard, solid images." — Arthur Miller.

Born in Roslyn, New York, he began his movie career at the age of 13. According to a 1970 interview with Leonard Maltin, he once worked for a horse dealer. One day, he was returning home from delivering some horses and was sitting on a horse when a man offered him a job in motion pictures because he could ride bareback. Miller recalled, "The first day we went out to a golf course in Brooklyn, and I rode this horse all over, got chased, and all." He found himself working as an assistant to filmmaker Fred J. Balshofer. The two remained lifelong friends and in 1967 co-wrote a book about the early days of film titled One Reel a Week.

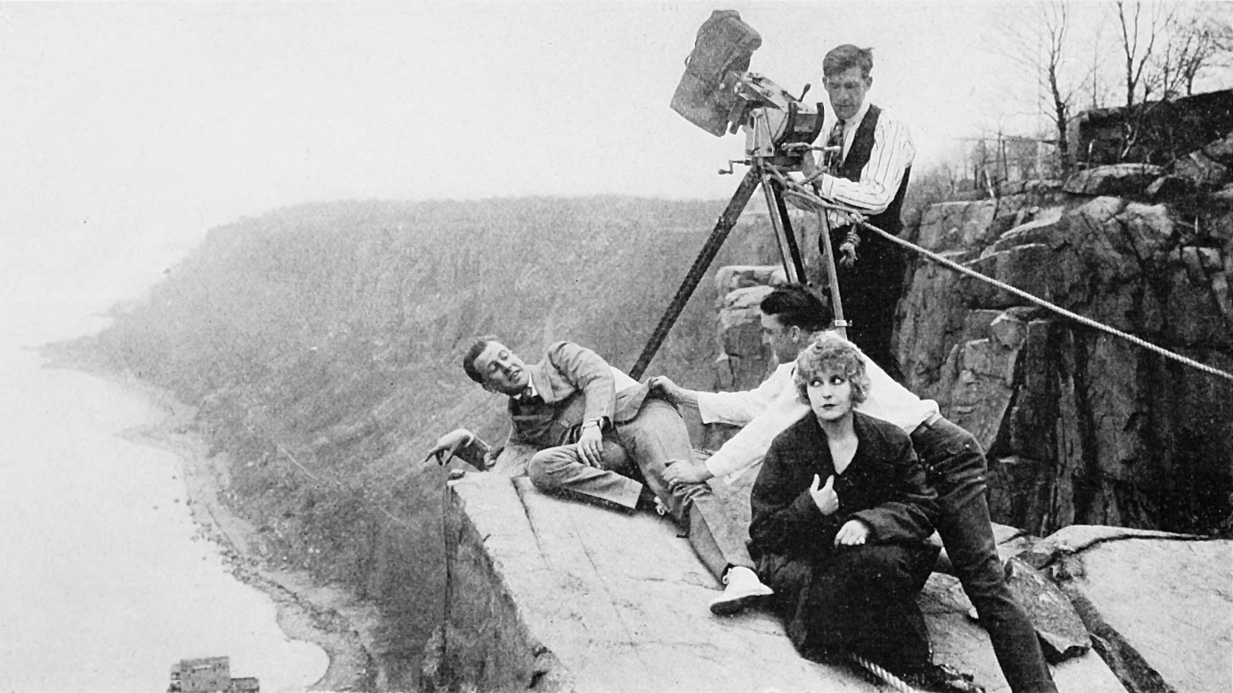
Actors Antonio Moreno and Pearl White, director George B. Seitz, and Miller at Cliffhanger Point on the Hudson River Palisades for the 1918 film The House of Hate

Miller eventually joined Pathé and, although only 19 years old, became the cinematographer for the 1914 adventure serial The Perils of Pauline. He worked for Astra Film Co. and then Solax Studios in New Jersey.

In 1918, he and his brother Bill founded the Motion Picture Industry Union. He moved to Hollywood and had a lengthy tenure at Paramount from the late teens throughout the 1920s. In 1932, Miller signed a long-term contract with Fox Film Corporation to be the cinematographer for every Shirley Temple film. He retired in 1951 for health reasons but remained active in the industry as president of the American Society of Cinematographers.

He died in Los Angeles, California, in 1970 and was interred in the Hollywood Forever Cemetery.

In August 1973, his widow Mae Miller and Donald Crisp attended the dedication of the Arthur Miller Memorial Fountain and Arbor at the Motion Picture & Television Country House and Hospital in Woodland Hills.

In 2021, the American Society of Cinematographers named How Green Was My Valley, photographed by Arthur C. Miller, among the 20 most beautifully shot films of all time.

== Partial filmography ==
- At Coney Island (1912 short)
- The Perils of Pauline (1914 serial)
- At Bay (1915)
- Arms and the Woman (1916)
- Big Jim Garrity (1916)
- New York (1916)
- The Romantic Journey (1916)
- The Test (1916)
- Kick In (1917)
- The Hunting of the Hawk (1917)
- The Recoil (1917)
- Blind Man's Luck (1917)
- The On-the-Square Girl (1917)
- The Mark of Cain (1917)
- Sylvia of the Secret Service (1917)
- Vengeance Is Mine (1917)
- The Iron Heart (1917)
- Convict 993 (1918)
- A Japanese Nightingale (1918)
- The Hillcrest Mystery (1918)
- The Naulahka (1918)
- The Cry of the Weak (1919)
- The Avalanche* (1919)
- The Profiteers (1919)
- Our Better Selves (1919)
- A Society Exile (1919)
- The Witness for the Defense (1919)
- Counterfeit (1919)
- On With the Dance (1920)
- His House in Order (1920)
- The Right to Love (1920)
- Lady Rose's Daughter (1920)
- Idols of Clay (1920)
- Paying the Piper (1921)
- Experience (1921)
- Forever (1921)
- Three Live Ghosts (1922)
- To Have and to Hold (1922)
- Kick In (1922)
- Bella Donna (1923)
- The Cheat (1923)
- The Eternal City (1923)
- Cytherea (1924)
- Tarnish (1924)
- In Hollywood with Potash and Perlmutter (1924)
- A Thief in Paradise (1925)
- His Supreme Moment (1925)
- The Coming of Amos (1925)
- Made for Love (1926)
- The Volga Boatman (1926)
- Eve's Leaves (1926)
- For Alimony Only (1926)
- The Clinging Vine (1926)
- Vanity (1927)
- The Fighting Eagle* (1927)
- The Angel of Broadway (1927)
- The Blue Danube (1928)
- The Cop (1928)
- Annapolis (1928)
- The Spieler (1928)
- His First Command (1929)
- Oh, Yeah! (1929)
- The Bellamy Trial (1929)
- Strange Cargo (1929)
- The Flying Fool (1929)
- Sailor's Holiday (1929)
- The Truth About Youth (1930)
- See America Thirst (1930)
- Officer O'Brien (1930)
- Father's Son (1931)
- Bad Company (1931)
- The Big Shot (1931)
- Panama Flo (1932)
- A Woman Commands (1932)
- Young Bride (1932)
- Okay, America! (1932)
- Me and My Gal (1932)
- Sailor's Luck (1933)
- Hold Me Tight (1933)
- The Man Who Dared (1933)
- The Last Trail (1933)
- My Weakness (1933)
- Ever Since Eve (1934)
- Bottoms Up (1934)
- Handy Andy (1934)
- The White Parade (1934)
- Bright Eyes (1934)
- The Little Colonel (1935)
- It's a Small World (1935)
- Black Sheep (1935)
- Welcome Home (1935)
- Paddy O'Day (1936)
- White Fang (1936)
- 36 Hours to Kill (1936)
- Pigskin Parade (1936)
- Stowaway (1936)
- Wee Willie Winkie (1937)
- Heidi (1938)
- Rebecca of Sunnybrook Farm (1938)
- Just Around the Corner (1938)
- Little Miss Broadway (1938)
- The Little Princess (1939)
- Young Mr. Lincoln (1939, uncredited)
- The Rains Came (1939)
- Susannah of the Mounties (1939)
- Here I Am a Stranger (1939)
- The Blue Bird (1940; nominated for an Academy Award, shared with Ray Rennahan)
- Johnny Apollo (1940)
- On Their Own (1940)
- Brigham Young (1940)
- The Mark of Zorro (1940)
- Tobacco Road (1941)
- Man Hunt (1941)
- How Green Was My Valley (1941; Academy Award)
- The Men in Her Life (1941)
- Son of Fury: The Story of Benjamin Blake (1942)
- This Above All (1942; Academy Award nomination)
- Immortal Sergeant (1943)
- The Moon Is Down (1943)
- The Song of Bernadette (1943; Academy Award)
- The Ox-Bow Incident (1943)
- Lifeboat (uncredited, 1944)
- The Purple Heart (1944)
- The Keys of the Kingdom (1944; Academy Award nomination)
- A Royal Scandal (1945)
- Dragonwyck (1946)
- Anna and the King of Siam (1946; Academy Award)
- The Razor's Edge (1946)
- Gentleman's Agreement (1947)
- The Walls of Jericho (1948)
- A Letter to Three Wives (1949)
- Whirlpool (1950)
- The Gunfighter (1950)
- The Prowler (1951)

* - according to silentera.com
