= The On-the-Square Girl =

- Directed by: George Fitzmaurice
- Written by: Ouida Bergère
- Starring: Mollie King; L. Rogers Lytton; Aimee Dalmores
- Cinematography: Arthur C. Miller
- Production company: Astra Film
- Distributed by: Pathé Exchange
- Release date: July 29, 1917
- Running time: 50 minutes
- Country: United States
- Languages: Silent; English intertitles

The On-the-Square Girl is a 1917 American silent drama film directed by George Fitzmaurice and starring Mollie King, L. Rogers Lytton, and Aimee Dalmores. Location shooting for the film was done in Saranac Lake, New York.

== Cast ==
- Mollie King as Anne Blair
- L. Rogers Lytton as Thomas Brockton
- Aimee Dalmores as Inez Brockton
- Donald Hall as Richard Steel
- Ernest Lawford as Renee
- Richard Tucker as Actor

== Preservation ==
Previously considered a lost film, in February 2021, The On-the-Square Girl was cited by the National Film Preservation Board as a recent "find" removed from their Lost U.S. Silent Feature Films list. However, the report does not specify details about the find or its location.

== Bibliography ==
- Paul C. Spehr. The Movies Begin: Making Movies in New Jersey, 1887-1920. Newark Museum, 1977.
