= Dalmores =

Dalmores is a surname. Notable people with the surname include:

- Aimée Dalmores (1890–1920), Italian-born American actress
- Charles Dalmorès (1871–1939), French tenor
