= Louise Mvembve =

20th-century South African midwife, herbalist, and healer

Louise Mvembve (alternatively spelled Louisa Mvemve) was a midwife, herbalist, healer, and self-described "diagnostician" in South Africa during the early and mid-20th century. She has been posthumously attributed to researching and testing many treatments for ailments and diseases, as well as research focusing on compounds of plants and traditional medicine. Mvembve would have been considered a woman who participated in many trades, because on top of the previously mentioned career paths, she also was a chemist, and a fertility expert, or doula.

== Background ==
The cultural practice of healing had been passed on for generations, used for medicinal and psychological health. Centuries of healing stemmed from spiritual and religious cultural values that African women customs provided. Healing was commonly practiced in Africa, specifically countries in the Southern Africa region. Traditional healing was well organized within many regions of the world, and each had its own cultural differences. South African medical history contained various rituals, remedies, ceremonies, massages, mental exercises, and more. African healers were popularized for their abilities of healing numerous diseases, mental health disorders, physical deformities, and more. Spiritual needs of patients had been treated by the different healers circumstantially.

=== Health and healing in early 20th century Africa ===
Prior to colonization, societies across the African continent had many people who could be consulted for healing, similar to the modern concept of receiving multiple consultations or opinions on an illness and prescribed treatment. These could include medical doctors, pharmacists, religious practitioners, sorcerers (people who specialized in "magical" cures), herbalists, and exorcists. When herbal remedies or other "conventional" attempts to cure an ailment failed, it wasn't unheard of for it to be attributed to ill intent from someone else, or even ancestors or spirits who had been wronged or disrespected. Post colonization, many of the colonizing powers officially denounced many of these practices as "witchcraft" or superstition, but in practice these same powers (such as Britain) did little to enforce the bans they wrote into law. Meanwhile, African healers, such as Louisa Mvemve and her grandparents before her, learned techniques and medicines from European-style hospitals (of which, the early ones were usually founded and run by religious missions) and incorporated methods they found useful into their own practices, such as midwifery.

In South Africa, many aspects of the health care system for black South Africans arose in response to an economy reliant on cheap labor. In some instances, it was projected that the research and development of cures for ailments resulting from poor working conditions would be far less expensive than the improvement of the working conditions themselves, even in cases where the resulting cures proved ineffective. Additionally, research institutions founded by mining corporations, such as the South African Institute for Medical Research, often stereotyped black workers (local and migrant) as biologically weaker and more susceptible to injury and illness.

Near the turn of the 20th century, there was a growing pushback from western trained doctors and chemists in South Africa to stamp out many of the practices used by traditional African healers, deeming most of their methods as "witchcraft". While the Native Ordinance of 1895 protected "native medicine men and women" and their practices, this Ordinance was repealed in many areas over the next few decades. Finally, the introduction of the Medical, Dental, and Pharmacy Bill in 1928 meant only those who were certified and trained in western medicine were considered officially qualified to practice medicine. By 1910, no non-western trained medical man or woman in South Africa was able to receive a license to practice medicine, with only those in the Natal area being exempt.

== Early life and childhood ==
Louisa Mvembve was born in the late 1800s, in the Port Alfred region of East Cape, South Africa near the turn of the 20th century. Her mother worked for the wife of a white landowner, while her father worked as a servant to the Magistrate of Sailem. Both of her maternal grandparents had backgrounds in medicine and nursing, and she frequently attributed much of her knowledge of herbal medicine to them in several of her personal correspondences later in life. She began working at a young age for the Webber family as a baby-minder, and it has been posited that it was at the Webber family farm that she learned some of her skill and knowledge on growing and harvesting medicinal plants, as well as where she began her training as a nursemaid and caregiver.

== Work in healthcare ==
Though the exact date of her workshop's establishment is unclear, records from a 1916 court case against Louisa show by that point that she had already set up a workshop in Brakpan for the preparation and packaging of medicinal herbs. Unlike many other traditional healers of this time, Louisa was somewhat successful in her petition to obtain a license as an herbalist, owing to a clause written into her request that gave the option of selling her herbal medicines through official pharmacies.

In 1915, Louisa published an herbal manual titled "Women's Advice: A Woman's Advice to the Public on the Cure of Various Diseases". Among its contents were information on the making of herbal medicines, proper techniques for dressing wounds, and information on food, sleep, and proper bathing. Owing to this, it has been compared to early First-Aid manuals and booklets from the Department of Health and the Red Cross, though these would not arrive until years after Louisa's manual.

However, in 1916, Louisa was arrested after a man suffering from late-stage syphilis approached her for treatment of his pain and then later died under her care. Her quick thinking in summoning the man's regular doctor shortly before and after his death, sending to the pharmacy for the bottle of medicine she had recommended for him, her rapid communication with the local Governor and officials, and her urging for a proper post-mortem of the man and examination by a poisons expert of the medicine administered all saved her from being charged with culpable homicide. Instead, she was charged a fine for violating ordinances against practicing traditional medicines. However, at the same time, she was arrested under a Trespass Clause in the Gold Law, which prohibited native South Africans from certain areas on gold mine property - in her case, a boarding house she rented rooms in while treating the deceased man. After posting bail for this new charge, she retained an attorney, and the charges were dropped and bail returned after it was established, through the testimony of a member of the Mining Commission, that land the boarding house sat on had in fact been recently sold off by the mine to the municipality and was officially outside of mine property.

However, in the 1920s Mvemve was forced to give up her workshop and herbarium in Brakpan after the introduction of the Urban Areas Act of 1923, and she was subsequently forced to relocate to Grahamstown. In 1928 she was further forced to quit her profession under the passing of the Medical, Dental, and Pharmacy Act. She petitioned this many times to differing government officials, but ultimately was unsuccessful. Finally, in 1931, she was arrested and charged with unlawfully practicing as a midwife. She was acquitted primarily on the grounds that the law was not specific enough on what constituted as "practicing" as a registered midwife or doctor, and that there was uncertainty as to whether or not she had received payment for her services.

== Notable aspects of Mvembve's life ==
Mvembve was a South African woman who was involved in a wide range of life experiences. As an independent health and healing practitioner, the complexity of her life was nothing short of astounding. Analyzing the life of Mvembve exemplified and provided a glimpse into women's experience during an era of much turmoil and struggle. Mvembve was not formally educated, she did not have the same advantages of others in her time. She did not have the support of the patriarchy in her studies. Mvembve was a chemist, but considered herself as any other scientist, respected Western Medicine, but did not agree with it. She was known for her research to cure disease and other ailments by using compounds of various plants and traditional medicine. In addition to her science and healing career, Mvembve had experience as a midwife or fertility expert, and she was a property owner. Many Black women during the 1920s only had the option to work as sex-workers or beer-brewers, which Mvembve had a part in changing due to her success in her various lines of work.

== Legacy ==
Mvembve maintained an above average reputation with people like the Kerr Muir family and the Thimbler Family, who held on to her memory. Her life's work within Johannesburg and the East Rand towns illustrated a time when the aid and research she contributed to were not readily available to many women or women of color during her time. She created considerably large-scale networks of the black community of men and women who supported her journey, and built connections with the White working class due to her studies and achievements. As a skilled horticulturist, woman healer, and more, the trust that she gained in her career influenced the current historical studies of what Victorian life, medicine, healing, literacy levels, segregation and Apartheid, and midwifery had looked like throughout the early 20th century.
