= The Summer Girl =

- Directed by: Edwin August
- Written by: Frances Marion
- Based on: a story by L. V. Jefferson
- Produced by: Peerless Pictures
- Starring: Mollie King
- Cinematography: Philip Hatkin
- Distributed by: World Pictures
- Release date: August 14, 1916
- Running time: 5 reels

The Summer Girl is a lost 1916 silent film comedy drama directed by Edwin August and starring Mollie King. It was produced by Peerless Pictures Studios and distributed by World Pictures.

== Cast ==
- Mollie King - Mary Anderson
- Arthur Ashley - Bruce Haldeman
- Dave Ferguson - Smythe Addison
- Ruby Hoffman - Katheryn Green
- Harold Entwistle - Mr. Anderson
- Dora Mills Adams - Mrs. Anderson
