= Stranded in Arcady =

1917 film

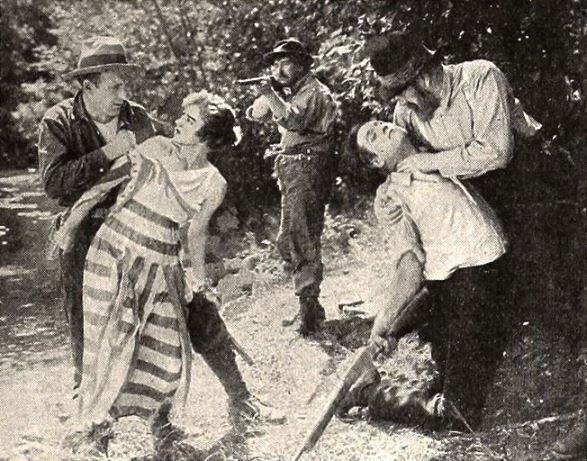
- Still from a film magazine
- Directed by: Frank Hall Crane
- Written by: Francis Lynde (novel); Philip Bartholomae
- Starring: Irene Castle; Elliott Dexter; George Majeroni
- Production company: Astra Film
- Distributed by: Pathé Exchange
- Release date: October 14, 1917
- Country: United States
- Languages: Silent; English intertitles

Stranded in Arcady is a 1917 American silent adventure film directed by Frank Hall Crane and starring Irene Castle, Elliott Dexter and George Majeroni. It is based on the novel Stranded in the Arcady by Francis Lynde.

== Cast ==
- Irene Castle as Lucy Millington
- Elliott Dexter as Donald Prime
- George Majeroni as Edward Blandish
- Pell Trenton as Edward Girder

== Bibliography ==
- Robert B. Connelly. The Silents: Silent Feature Films, 1910-36, Volume 40, Issue 2. December Press, 1998.
