= Stranded in the Arcady =

1917 book by Francis Lynde

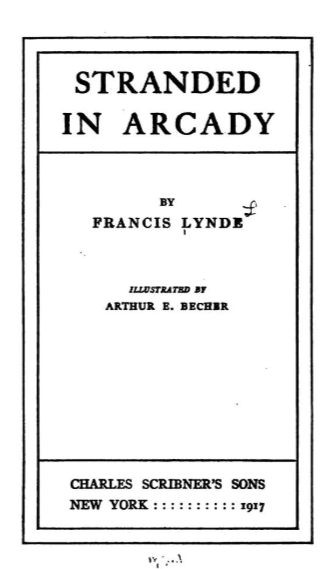
- Title page for Stranded in the Arcady (1917)
- Author: Francis Lynde
- Illustrator: Arthur E. Becher
- Language: English
- Publication date: 1917
- OCLC: 6563666

Stranded in the Arcady was a popular novel by Francis Lynde (1856–1930) first published in 1917. It was adapted to a silent film, Stranded in Arcady by Astra Film.

The novel was illustrated by Arthur E. Becher. Several of Lynde's other books were also adapted into films.

== Plot summary ==
The story is set in the Canadian wilderness. The hero and heroine, strangers to each other, awaken in the wilds of Canada, not knowing how they got there from Quebec. The hero suspects a friend of his, a practical joker. They have many adventures attempting to return to civilization.

== Film adaptation ==
The silent film was directed by Frank Hall Crane and starred Irene Castle, Elliott Dexter, George Majeroni, and Pell Trenton.
