= The Danger Signal (1915 film) =

1915 silent film by Walter Ewin

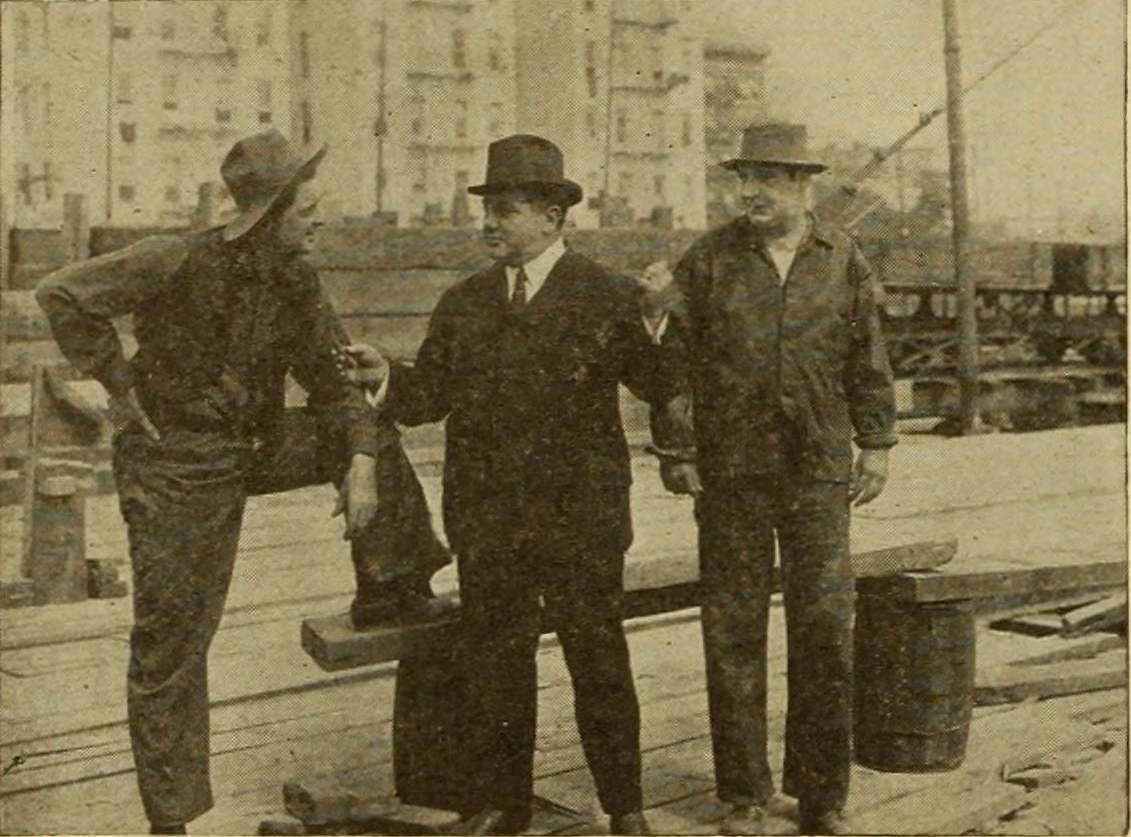
- Directed by: Walter Edwin
- Story by: Rupert Hughes
- Produced by: George Kleine
- Starring: Arthur Hoops; Ruby Hoffman; John Davidson
- Production company: George Kleine Productions
- Distributed by: Kleine-Edison Feature Services
- Release date: December 1, 1915
- Running time: 5 reels
- Country: United States
- Language: Silent (English intertitles)

The Danger Signal, Canavan, the Man Who Had His Way or Caravan is a lost 1915 American silent drama film directed by Walter Edwin and produced by George Kleine. It is based on the story by Rupert Hughes, which was originally published in the Saturday Evening Post.

== Plot ==
According to a film magazine, "Danny Canavan, a blacksmith's son, possessing great strength, is a cringing, wavering, abject coward, scorned by all, particularly his father. Danny's wife does not neglect any opportunity to browbeat and scold him, neither do the helpers in his father's shop miss a chance to kick and beat him. President Cadbury, of an insurance company, is one day riding with his fiancee in a carriage that knocks down and severely injures Canavan. He is carried home and put to bed where he remains for many weeks, unable to escape even for a moment the gibes and taunts of his sharp-tongued wife, who, when he recovers, goes to the ward boss and obtains, through him a position as laborer for Canavan. Here, scorned by fellow workingmen, and nagged by a pitiless foreman, he spends a most unhappy time.

One day, he is tasked with warning vehicles and pedestrians away from a site where dynamite is set to detonate. Using a red flag, he directs the traffic, and the crowd obeys his signals. This experience leads to a change in his self-perception and confidence. Shortly after, he asserts his independence to his father and wife, and physically engages with one of his father's employees

At a ward caucus later, he wins the favor of a political boss by whipping a dozen political mar plots, and Is then taken into the boss' office. He quickly becomes a power in politics through the force of his dominant character, and is later made chief of a powerful political party organization. He now has social ambitions and when he has an indictment against Cadbury quashed, he demands as his price that Cadbury and his wife sponsor his social aspirations, which they do, with the result that he is soon dominant in that sphere. Canavan takes a party to England, buys an entrant in the English Derby and wins that classic of the turf. His personality is simply overpowering, and none can successfully oppose him. Cadbury is killed while the party is in England and Canavan, who had become a widower, crowns his triumphal march by marrying Mrs. Cadbury. The latter quickly discovers Canavan to be without manners or polish, and she tells him of the embarrassment this causes her. Then comes the climax in which Canavan rises to the occasion, and again has his way."

== Cast ==
- Arthur Hoops as Danny Canavan / Dennis Canavan
- Ruby Hoffman as Beatrice Newnes
- John Davidson as Rodman Cadbury
- Frank Belcher as Boss Havens
- Tom Walsh as Roscoe Newnes
- Billy Sherwood as Henry Cadbury
- Della Connor as Amy Carroll
- Florence Coventry as Mrs. Canavan

== Reception ==
Motion Picture News reviewer William Ressman Andrews gave The Danger Signal a glowing review, saying "There was nothing superfluous in the production" and that "nothing could have been left out without sacrificing some vital part of the story."

Moving Picture World reviewer W. Stephen Bush gave the film a positive review, stating that the beginning and ending of the film were strongest, but "a little cutting will improve the film."

Variety's review was also positive, calling it a "rattling good feature from every angle." The reviewer praised the scenes of a polo match and a horse race, which were clips of a real polo match and the English Derby.

== Preservation ==
With no holdings located in archives, The Danger Signal is considered a lost film.
