= George Washington Jr. (film) =

1924 film

- Directed by: Malcolm St. Clair
- Screenplay by: Rex Taylor
- Story by: Rex Taylor
- Based on: George Washington Jr. by George M. Cohan
- Starring: Wesley Barry; Gertrude Olmstead; Léon Bary; Heinie Conklin; Otis Harlan; William Courtright
- Cinematography: Edwin B. DuPar
- Production company: Warner Bros.
- Distributed by: Warner Bros.
- Release date: February 2, 1924
- Running time: 60 minutes
- Country: United States
- Language: Silent (English intertitles)

George Washington Jr. is a lost 1924 American silent comedy film directed by Malcolm St. Clair and written by Rex Taylor. It is based on the 1906 play George Washington Jr. by George M. Cohan. The film stars Wesley Barry, Gertrude Olmstead, Léon Bary, Heinie Conklin, Otis Harlan, and William Courtright. The film was released by Warner Bros. on February 2, 1924.

== Plot ==
As described in a film magazine review, Count Gorfa, anarchist leader, steals the private records of a Senate Investigative Committee, the loss of which threatens the political fortunes of Senator Belgrave, whose daughter the Count wishes to wed. The Senator's son, the young George Washington Belgrave, and his friend Robert Lee Hopkins trail the anarchists. After many adventures and burlesques of historical fables, the documents are recovered and the Senator is saved.

== Cast ==
- Wesley Barry as George Belgrave
- Gertrude Olmstead as Dolly Johnson
- Léon Bary as The Count Gorfa Tyrola
- Heinie Conklin as Eton Ham
- Otis Harlan as Sen. Hopkins
- William Courtright as Sen. Belgrave
- Eddie Phillips as Robert Lee Hopkins

== Production ==
Director Malcolm St. Clair had just completed his film series on boxing, Fighting Blood, for FBO studios when Warner Bros. engaged him to direct George Washington Jr., his first feature film. The well-known comic, Wesley Barry, referred to as "Freckles" for his boyish behavior on screen, who typically "substituted distorted facial muscles and enthusiastic gesticulation for acting" was cast in the lead role.

Director St. Clair, an "advocate of the naturalistic school of acting," coached the 16-year-old Barry so as to elicit a measure of maturity in his portrayal of the young "Washington." Whether the acting coach Josephine Dillon was involved in tutoring Barry is not known for certain, but his performance in the film exhibited a maturity that eschewed his trademark "mugging" and "hamming." The role of the servant Eton Ham was played by Conklin in blackface.

== Reception ==
Critics were divided over St. Clair's handling of Wesley Barry's performance. Motion Picture News described the actor's more mature screen persona as a “vast improvement” that still delivered comic effect. The reviewer in Variety registered disappointment that Barry's antics, especially his facial grimaces, were absent, but found the film to be “not a little fun” and good entertainment.

On the strength of the film's box office success, Warner Bros. executives provided director St. Clair with two-film contract.
