= Richard the Brazen =

- Directed by: Perry N. Vekroff
- Written by: Cyrus Townsend Brady (story); Edward Peple (story); A. Van Buren Powell
- Starring: Harry T. Morey; Alice Joyce; William Frederic
- Cinematography: Arthur T. Quinn
- Production company: Vitagraph Company of America
- Distributed by: V-L-S-E
- Release date: July 23, 1917
- Running time: 50 minutes
- Country: United States
- Languages: Silent; English intertitles

Richard the Brazen is a 1917 American silent comedy film directed by Perry N. Vekroff and starring Harry T. Morey, Alice Joyce and William Frederic.

== Cast ==
- Harry T. Morey as Richard Williams
- Alice Joyce as Harriet Renwyk
- William Frederic as Bill Williams
- Franklyn Hanna as Jacob Renwyk
- Robert Kelly as Corrigan
- Agnes Ayres as Imogene
- Charles Wellesley as Lord Croyland
- William Bailey as Fitzgeorge

== Bibliography ==
- Donald W. McCaffrey & Christopher P. Jacobs. Guide to the Silent Years of American Cinema. Greenwood Publishing, 1999.
