= The Seven Pearls =

1917 film

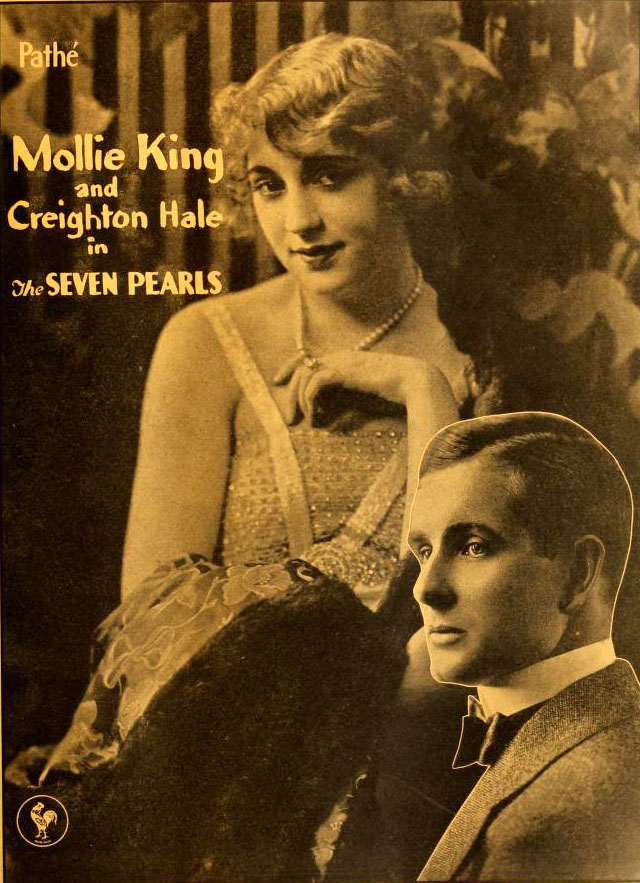
- Film poster
- Directed by: Louis J. Gasnier; Donald MacKenzie
- Starring: Mollie King; Creighton Hale
- Production company: Astra Films
- Distributed by: Pathé Exchange
- Release date: September 16, 1917
- Running time: 15 episodes (2 reels each)
- Country: United States
- Language: Silent (English intertitles)

The Seven Pearls is a 1917 American silent action film serial directed by Louis J. Gasnier and Donald MacKenzie. Fragments are held by the Library of Congress.

== Cast ==
- Mollie King as Ilma Bay
- Creighton Hale as Harry Drake
- Léon Bary as Perry Mason
- John J. Dunn as Grady
- Henry G. Sell as Handsome Jack

== Chapter titles ==
1. The Sultan's Necklace
2. The Bowstring
3. The Air Peril
4. Amid the Clouds
5. Between Fire and Water
6. The Abandoned Mine
7. The False Pearl
8. The Man Trap
9. The Message on the Wire
10. The Hold-Up
11. Gems of Jeopardy
12. Buried Alive
13. Over the Falls
14. The Tower of Death
15. The Seventh Pearl

== Reception ==
Like many American films of the time, The Seven Pearls was subject to cuts by city and state film censorship boards. For example, the Chicago Board of Censors required, in Chapter 5, a cut of the scenes where an airman threw two bombs at an automobile and of the shooting of a man in a ship; in Chapter 7, of the binding of the woman and man, in Chapter 10, the intertitle "Have $100,000 in the safe, etc.", setting fire to the waste paper basket, the holdup of the bank watchman, and all scenes showing detail of the attempt of the bank robbery; in Chapter 11, Reel 1, three scenes of the holdup of the young woman and her abduction, the pointing at woman's side as officer stops the machine, five holdup scenes in room, the holdup of the woman in the house, the binding of the woman, and Reel 2, the entire incident of the acid and candle burning nearby and the intertitle "It will not kill you – it will only spoil your beauty"; and, in Chapter 13, putting the bound and gagged young woman into a piano box; in Chapter 14, two scenes of choking young woman, blow to man's head, throwing man in front of train; in Chapter 15, the detailed method of a man fixing a gas bomb, drilling a safety deposit box, stealing pearls, and choking the young woman.
