= Her Majesty (1922 film) =

1922 American silent comedy film

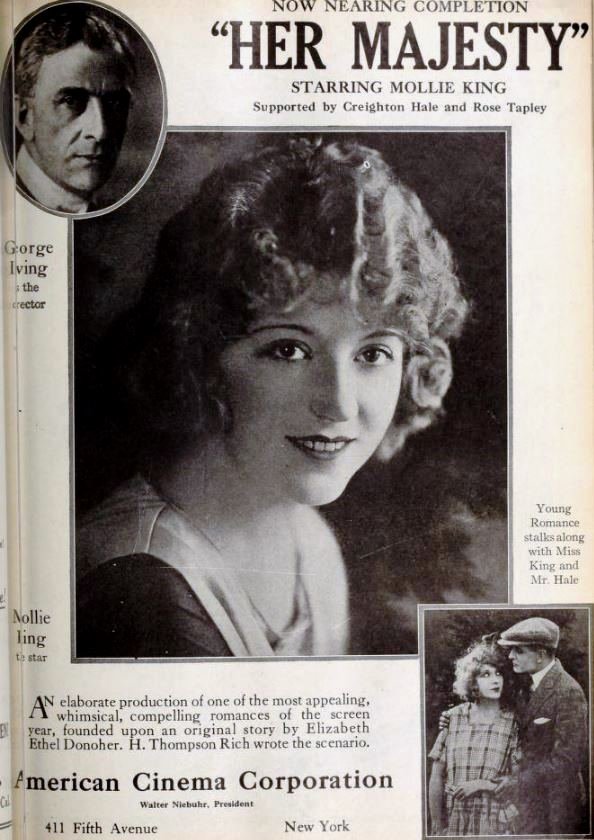
- Directed by: George Irving
- Written by: H. Thomson Rich
- Produced by: Paul Salvin
- Starring: Mollie King; Creighton Hale; Rose Tapley
- Cinematography: Walter Arthur
- Production company: Playgoers Pictures
- Distributed by: Associated Exhibitors
- Release date: July 23, 1922
- Running time: 50 minutes
- Country: United States
- Languages: Silent; English intertitles

Her Majesty is a 1922 American silent comedy film directed by George Irving and starring Mollie King, Creighton Hale and Rose Tapley.

== Plot ==
Orphaned identical twins sisters Rosalie and Susan are separated and brought up in completely different households. One becomes a snob while the other becomes a farm-raised girl next door. Confusion ensues when the latter's boyfriend encounters the former.

== Cast ==
- Mollie King as Susan Bowers / Rosalie Bowers
- Creighton Hale as Ted Harper
- Rose Tapley as Aunt Worthington
- Neville Percy as Wilfred Parkington
- T. Jerome Lawler as 'Slick' Harry

== Bibliography ==
- Connelly, Robert B. The Silents: Silent Feature Films, 1910-36, Volume 40, Issue 2. December Press, 1998.
- Munden, Kenneth White. The American Film Institute Catalog of Motion Pictures Produced in the United States, Part 1. University of California Press, 1997.
