= Mollie King (actress) =

American actress

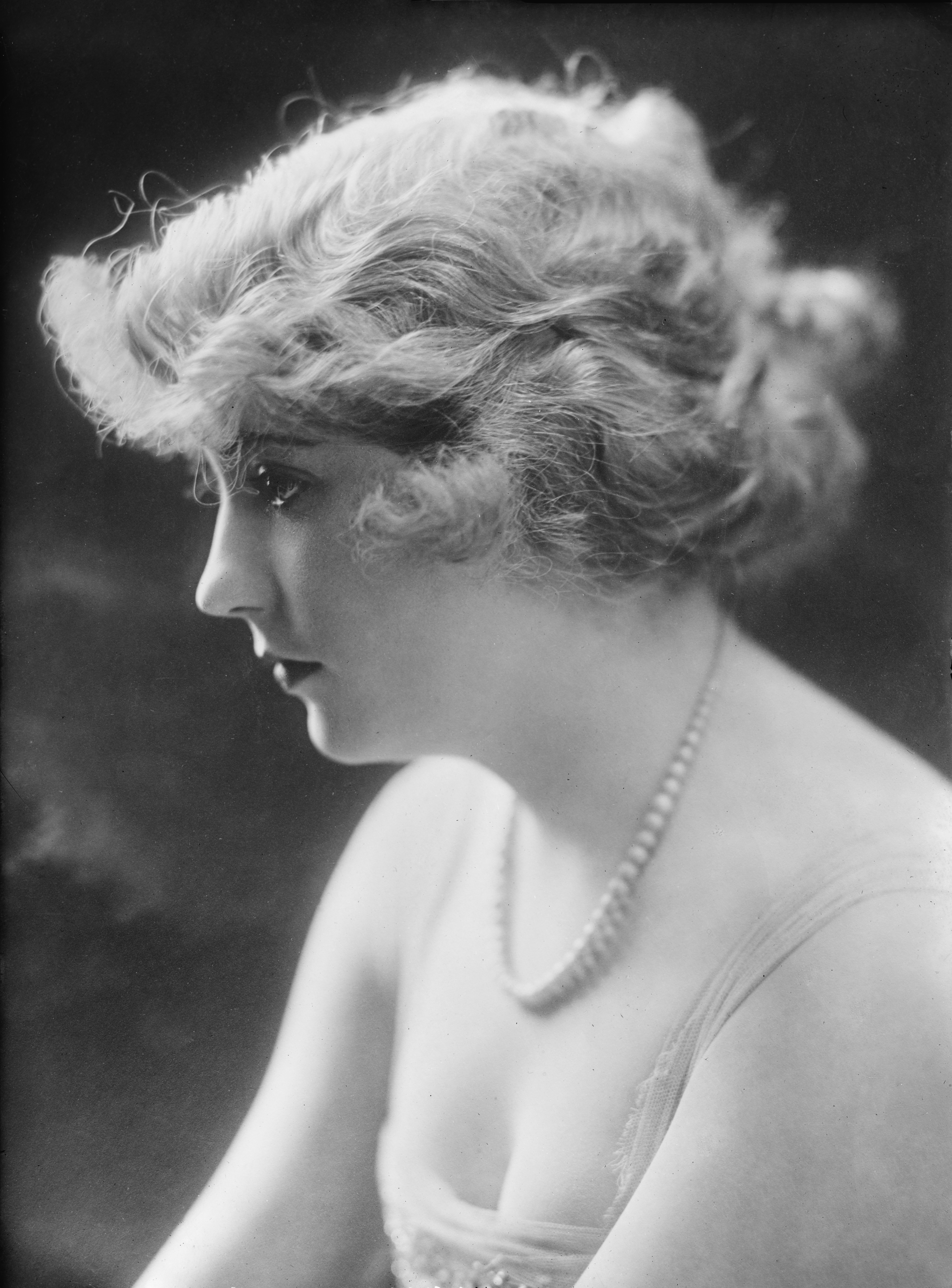
- Born: Mary Josephine King; April 16, 1895; New York City; United States
- Died: December 28, 1981 (aged 86); Fort Lauderdale, Florida; United States
- Resting place: Woodlawn Cemetery, New York
- Occupations: Stage and film actor
- Years active: 1902–1924
- Spouses: Kenneth Deedes Alexander (m. 1919; died 1935) Thomas Henry Claffey (m. 1943)
- Children: 1 son

Mollie King (born Mary Josephine King; April 16, 1895 – December 28, 1981) was an American stage and screen actress.

== Early life ==
Mollie King was born in New York City in 1895, the daughter of Ellen Mary (née Kearney) and Thomas Joseph King, both natives of Ireland. Two of her older siblings, Charles King and Nellie King also became actors and were likely instrumental in obtaining earlier roles for her in theatre.

== Stage career ==
Mollie began working professionally on stage at the age of seven. Later, by age 16, she was appearing at the Winter Garden Theatre and at other Broadway venues. A few of her stage credits include roles in Good Morning, Judge and Blue Eyes.

== Film career ==
King signed with Pathé before moving into film acting. She was cast in leading roles in two John M. Stahl directed films, and also starred in serials. George Irving directed her in the film Her Majesty. She later returned to the stage, appearing with her brother Charles King in a musical comedy Good Morning, Judge.

== Personal life and death ==
In 1918, King tried to enlist as an ambulance driver for the United States Army in France. It took two sergeants and a first lieutenant to convince her that women are not wanted at that position.

King married Kentucky distiller Kenneth D. Alexander in 1919. The couple remained married until Kenneth's death in Arkansas in July 1935. On March 9, 1943, at St. Matthew's Cathedral in Washington, D.C., she married Thomas Henry Claffey. Her son, Flight Officer Kenneth Alexander of the Royal Air Force, served as best man.

In 1981, at age 86, King died of a stroke in Fort Lauderdale, Florida. Her gravesite, however, is in her hometown of New York City, at Woodlawn Cemetery in the Bronx, as is that of her husband, who died the following year.

== Filmography ==
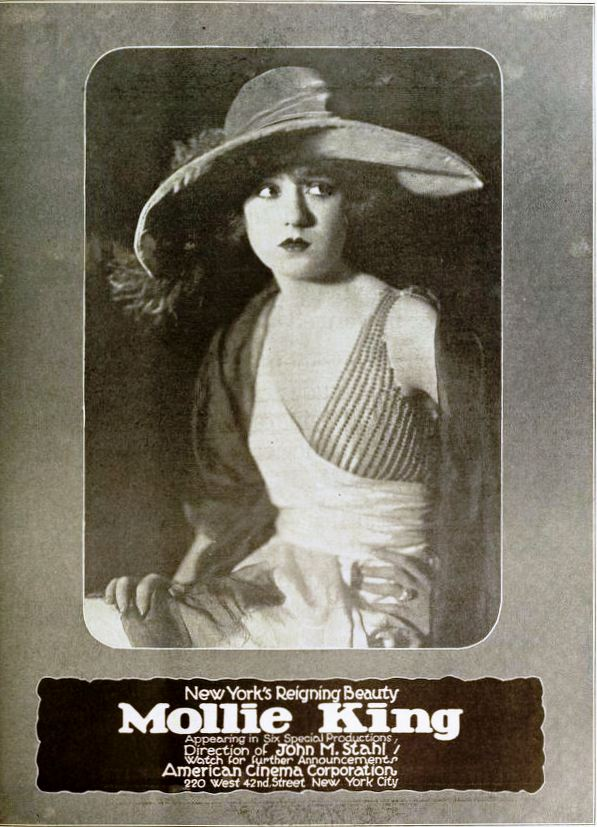
The Moving Picture World, 1919

Women Men Forget, 1920

- Fate's Boomerang (1916)
- A Circus Romance (1916)
- A Woman's Power (1916)
- Fate's Boomerang (1916)
- The Summer Girl (1916)
- All Man (1916)
- The Mystery of the Double Cross (1917)
- The Seven Pearls (1917)
- Kick In (1917)
- Blind Man's Luck (1917)
- The On-the-Square Girl (1917)
- Human Clay (1917)
- Women Men Forget (1920)
- Suspicious Wives (1921)
- Her Majesty (1922)
- Pied Piper Malone (1924)
