= The Million =

1914 film by Thomas N. Heffron

- Directed by: Thomas N. Heffron
- Screenplay by: Georges Berr; Marcel Guillemaud; Eve Unsell
- Produced by: Henry W. Savage
- Starring: Edward Abeles; Robert Stowe Gill; Ruby Hoffman; Edna Mayo; John Daly Murphy
- Production company: Famous Players Film Company
- Distributed by: Paramount Pictures
- Release date: December 31, 1914
- Country: United States
- Language: English

The Million is a 1914 American comedy silent film directed by Thomas N. Heffron and written by Georges Berr, Marcel Guillemaud and Eve Unsell. The film stars Edward Abeles, Robert Stowe Gill, Ruby Hoffman, Edna Mayo and John Daly Murphy. The film was released on December 31, 1914, by Paramount Pictures.

== Cast ==
- Edward Abeles as Le Baron
- Robert Stowe Gill
- Ruby Hoffman
- Edna Mayo
- John Daly Murphy
- William Roselle
