= The Restless Sex =

1920 film by Robert Zigler Leonard

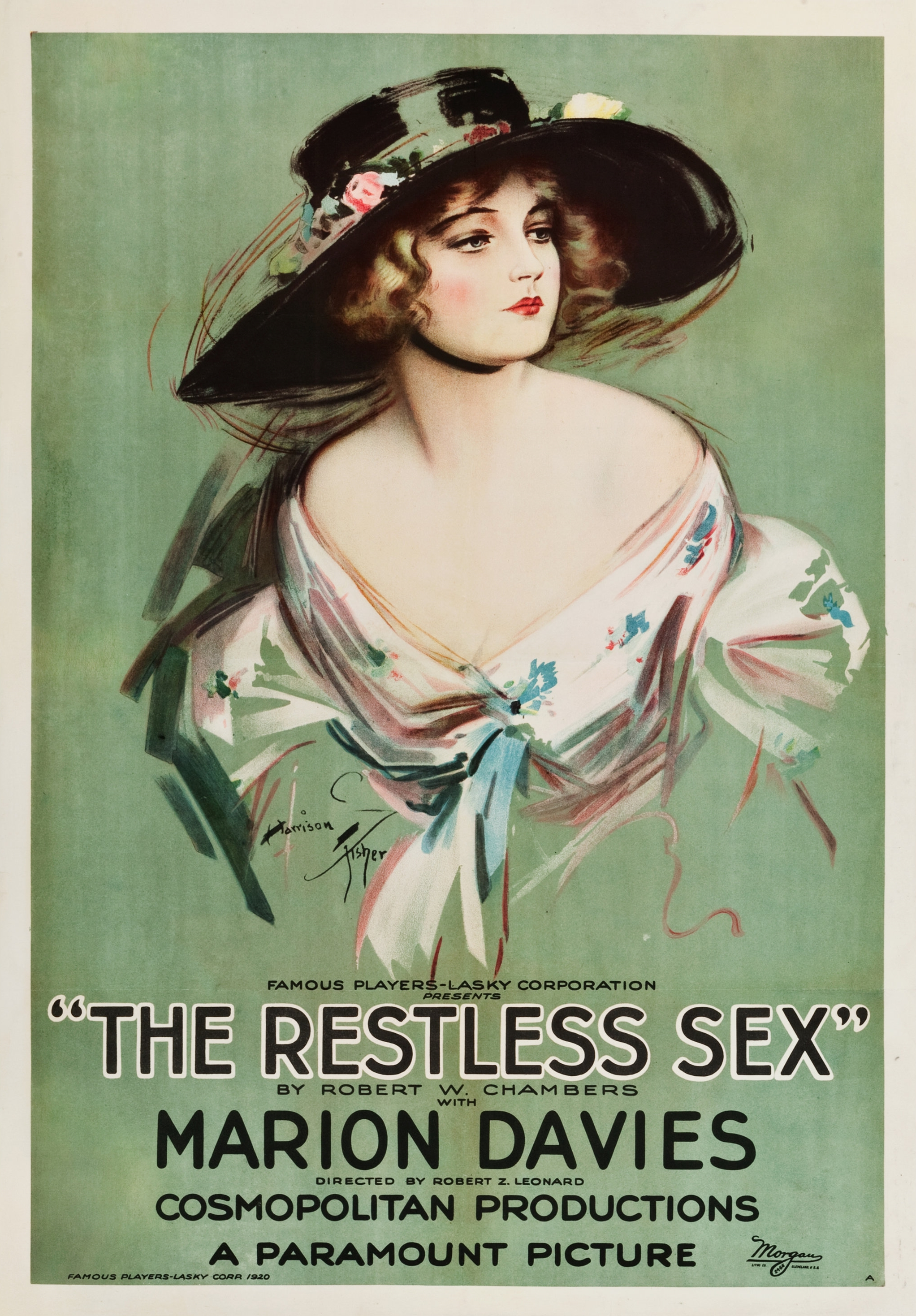
- Theatrical release poster by Harrison Fisher
- Directed by: Leon D'Usseau; Robert Z. Leonard
- Written by: Frances Marion
- Based on: The Restless Sex by Robert W. Chambers
- Starring: Marion Davies; Ralph Kellard
- Cinematography: Allen G. Siegler
- Production companies: Cosmopolitan Productions; International Film Service
- Distributed by: Famous Players–Lasky Corporation
- Release date: September 12, 1920
- Running time: 7 reels
- Country: United States
- Language: Silent (English intertitles)

The Restless Sex is a 1920 American silent drama film starring Marion Davies, and Ralph Kellard. It was directed by Leon D'Usseau and Robert Z. Leonard and written by Frances Marion. The film is based upon the 1918 novel of the same name by Robert W. Chambers and was distributed by Paramount Pictures under the Famous Players–Lasky Corporation name.

A copy of The Restless Sex is housed at the Library of Congress and Gosfilmofond.

== Plot ==
Stephanie is a restless and adventurous young woman. She is in love with Jim, her foster brother and childhood sweetheart. But now, she also finds herself attracted to art student Oswald Grismer. Jim leaves for Paris to become an author. In this period, Stephanie and Oswald decide to marry each other. When Jim finds out, he returns home to win Stephanie over.

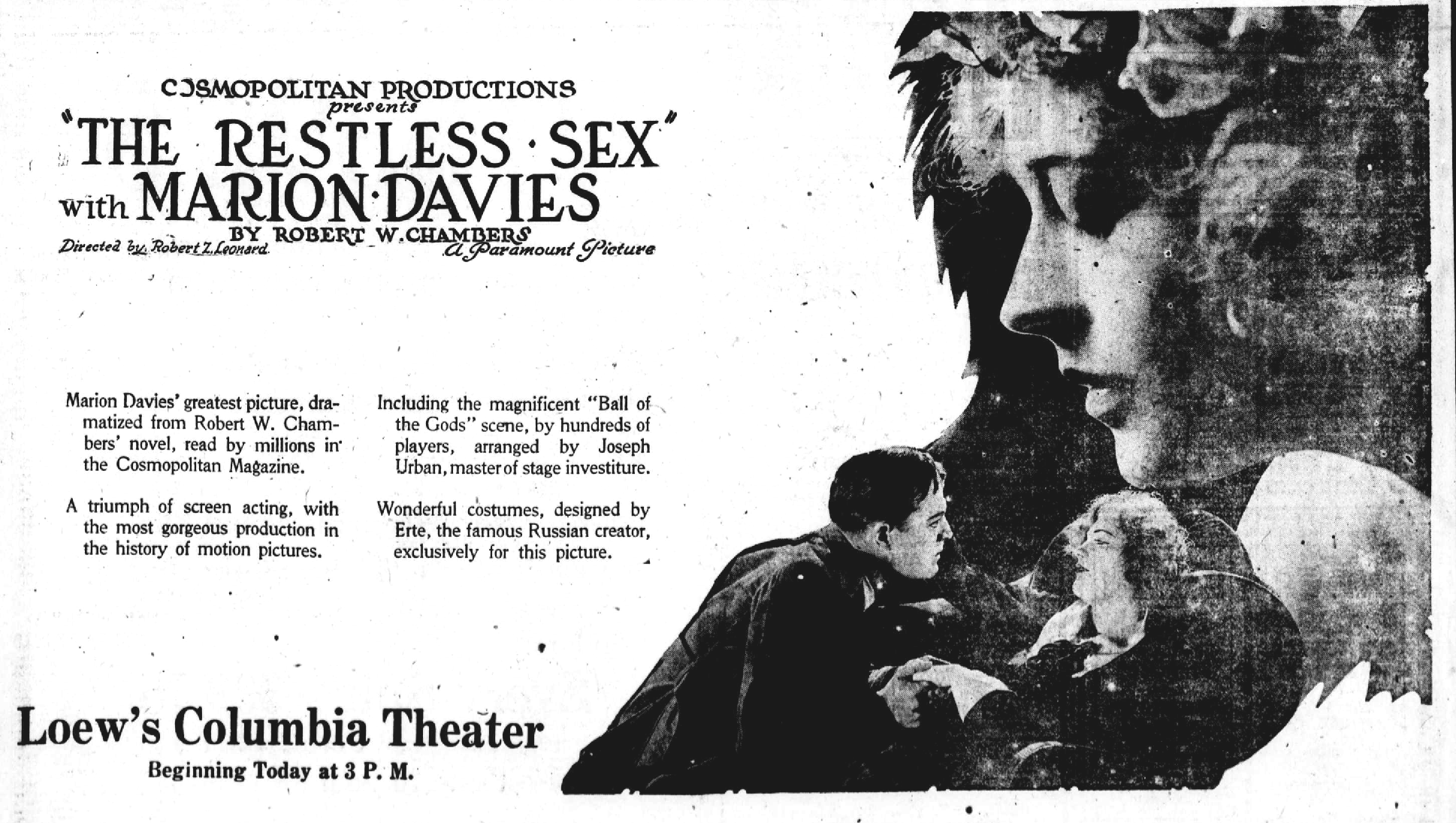
Film ads noted the costume design by Erté.

== Cast ==
- Marion Davies as Stephanie
- Ralph Kellard as Jim Cleland
- Carlyle Blackwell as Oswald Grismer
- Charles Lane as John Cleland
- Corinne Barker as Helen Davis
- Stephen Carr as Jim as a boy
- Vivienne Osborne as Marie Cliff
- Etna Ross as Steve as a child
- Robert Vivian as Chilsmer Grismer
- Athole Shearer as Extra (uncredited)
- Edith Shearer as Extra (uncredited)
- Norma Shearer as Extra (uncredited)

== Production ==
In her 9th film, Marion Davies portrays a restless young woman torn between two men. Costume design for the film, which featured a prolonged "Bal des Arts" sequence, was done by Erté. This was the first collaboration between Joseph Urban and Cosmopolitan Productions. In ball sequence Marion Davies portrays Pallas Athena, and Norma Shearer appears as an extra. This would prove to be the final American film for Carlyle Blackwell who would go to England and work in films for another decade.

== Censorship ==
Before the film could be released in Kansas, the Kansas Board of Review required the elimination of several scenes. The hotel revelry scene was shortened, the woman dancing on a table, and a man and woman embracing each other while rocking back and forth.

== Status ==
A DVD was released by Edward Lorusso with a music score by Donald Sosin in May 2015.
