= The Shielding Shadow =

1916 film

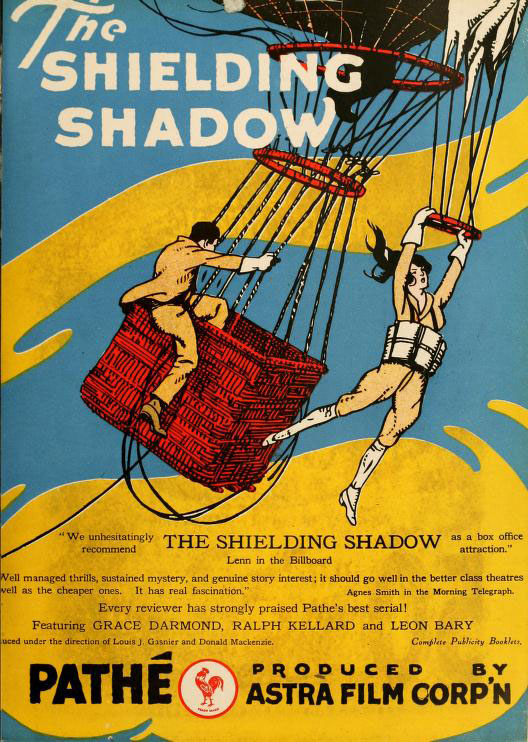
- Advertisement.
- Directed by: Louis J. Gasnier; Donald MacKenzie
- Written by: Randall Parrish; George B. Seitz
- Starring: Grace Darmond; Ralph Kellard
- Distributed by: Pathé Exchange; Astra Film
- Release date: October 1, 1916
- Running time: 15 episodes
- Country: United States
- Language: Silent (English intertitles)

The Shielding Shadow (was known in France by the name Ravengar) is a 1916 American action film serial directed by Louis J. Gasnier and Donald MacKenzie and starring Grace Darmond and Ralph Kellard.

== Plot ==
The serial centers on Leontine and her true love, Jerry Carson, who is unjustly framed for murder by his rival, Sebastian Navarro. The overarching plot involves Leontine being protected by a mysterious entity known as The Shielding Shadow, who uses invisibility and hypnotism, and whose appearance is characterized by two burning eyes and two ghostly white hands.

Leontine's father, Stephen Walcott, favors the suit of Sebastian Navarro to stabilize his finances, even though Leontine loves the penniless writer, Jerry Carson. After Jerry is reported lost in a ship fire, Sebastian has One Lamp Louie forge a paper to discredit Jerry. Jerry survives the wreck and finds a manuscript describing a buried fortune and black pellets that grant "power beyond the dreams of all men". Jerry confronts Sebastian's brother, Diego, over the forged paper. Diego dies during the ensuing struggle, and Jerry is arrested for murder, having been witnessed only by the silent blackmailer, One Lamp Louie. Jerry is unjustly convicted but escapes from a prison ship by hiding in a cholera victim's coffin. Believing Jerry is dead, Leontine agrees to marry Sebastian to save her father, stipulating that the marriage will be in name only. Jerry, having overheard Leontine's promise to marry Sebastian and heartbroken by the misunderstanding, sails for the buried treasure. He finds the dead scientist's skeleton and three black pellets before being dragged into the depths by a giant octopus. After months pass, Sebastian attempts to force his affections upon Leontine, but the Shielding Shadow appears with its burning eyes and white hands, threatening Sebastian with a dagger and terrifying him into fleeing. The Shadow later protects Leontine during a fire and threatens Sebastian when he attempts violence. The search for Louie's confession, which proves the forgery and clears Jerry's name, becomes central to the plot. Louie, who has become a millionaire, is hypnotized by the Shielding Shadow into writing the confession, but the paper is snatched away by an unseen hand during a struggle. The confession paper is passed among criminals, including Ramanoff, a master crook, and Bianca, a Queen of Blackmailers. Leontine courageously seeks the paper in a secret gambling house and, during a dramatic confrontation, the invisible Shadow fights the crooks, knocking them down and hurling a vase at Sebastian to protect Leontine and secure the paper for her. However, just after she escapes and starts reading the paper, One Lamp Louie snatches it back from her.

The 15-chapter story ultimately involves the heroine being protected by the mysterious figure, who utilizes a cloak of invisibility, hypnotism, and action sequences involving earthquakes and an octopus.

== Cast ==
- Grace Darmond as Leontine
- Ralph Kellard as Jerry Carson
- Léon Bary as Sebastian Navarro
- Madlaine Traverse as Barbara
- Lionel Braham as The Bouncer
- Frankie Mann as The Cabaret Singer
- Leslie King as One Lump Louie

== Chapters ==
1. The Treasure Trove
2. Into the Depths
3. The Mystic Defender
4. The Earthquake
5. Through Bolted Doors
6. The Disappearing Shadow
7. The Awakening
8. The Haunting Hand
9. The Incorrigible Captive
10. The Vanishing Mantle
11. The Great Sacrifice
12. The Stolen Shadow
13. The Hidden Menace
14. Absolute Black
15. The Final Chapter

== Notes ==
Most of the chapters of this serial are lost with only chapters 4, 10, 11, 14 and 15 still remaining according to Treasures from the Film Archives by Ronald S. Magliozzi.

Ravengar, as the focus of the French title and the Mysterious Stranger, is depicted taking on the physical protection of Leontine, while the Shielding Shadow is described as the entity that appears with "two burning eyes and two ghostly white hands" to terrorize Sebastian and use invisibility and hypnotism to defend Leontine and advance the search for the confession. The connection between the two figures suggests they may be the same person or entity, especially given that the serial's name in France was Ravengar

A French-American production, The Shielding Shadow was directly inspired by another silent movie serial, Judex - produced by Pathé Exchange's competitor Gaumont - whose first episode was titled The Mysterious Shadow. As Judex's release was delayed because of World War I, The Shielding Shadow was distributed in the United States before Judex. The Gaumont production, however, managed to be released in France before The Shielding Shadow (known in France as Ravengar). Both films appear to have been inspirations for the American pulp character The Shadow, who wears a costume similar to Judex's and has a power of invisibility like The Shielding Shadow's protagonist.
