= Léon Bary =

French actor (1880–1954)

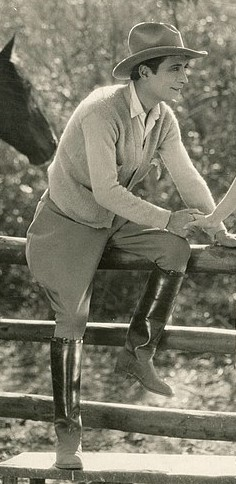
- Born: 6 June 1880; Paris, France
- Died: 7 January 1954 (aged 73); France
- Years active: 1913–1942

Léon Bary (6 June 1880 – 7 January 1954) was a French actor. He appeared in more than 50 films between 1916 and 1955. He was born in Paris, France, and died in Paris, aged 73.

== Selected filmography ==
Year	Title	Role	Notes
1916	The Shielding Shadow	Sebastian Navarro	
1917	The Mystery of the Double Cross	Peter Hale	
1917	The Seven Pearls	Perry Mason	
1918	The Yellow Ticket	Petrov Paviak	
1920	Kismet	Caliph Abdullah	
1921	The Three Musketeers	Athos	
1922	The Galloping Kid	Fred Bolston	Credited as Leon Barry
1922	The Call of Home	Alan Wayne	
1923	The White Flower	David Panuahi	
1924	The King of Wild Horses	Billy Blair	
1924	The Lightning Rider	Rammon Gonzales	Credited as Leon Barry
1924	George Washington Jr.	The Count Gorfa Tyrola	
1925	Midnight Molly	George Calvin	Credited as Leon Barry
1925	The Night Watch	Stello	
1926	The Good Reputation	Max de Termonde	
1927	Palaces	Marquis d'Areghi	
1928	The Maelstrom of Paris	Jean Chaluste	
1929	The Iron Mask	Athos	
1930	The Road Is Fine	Comte Armand Hubert	
1931	77 Rue Chalgrin	Morland	
1932	Narcotics	Pierre Perade	
1936	In the Service of the Tsar	Tomsky's friend	
1946	The Captain		
1948	City of Hope	Williams	
1949	Du Guesclin	Léon Barry	
1950	Three Telegrams		
