= Edwin Mordant =

Actor

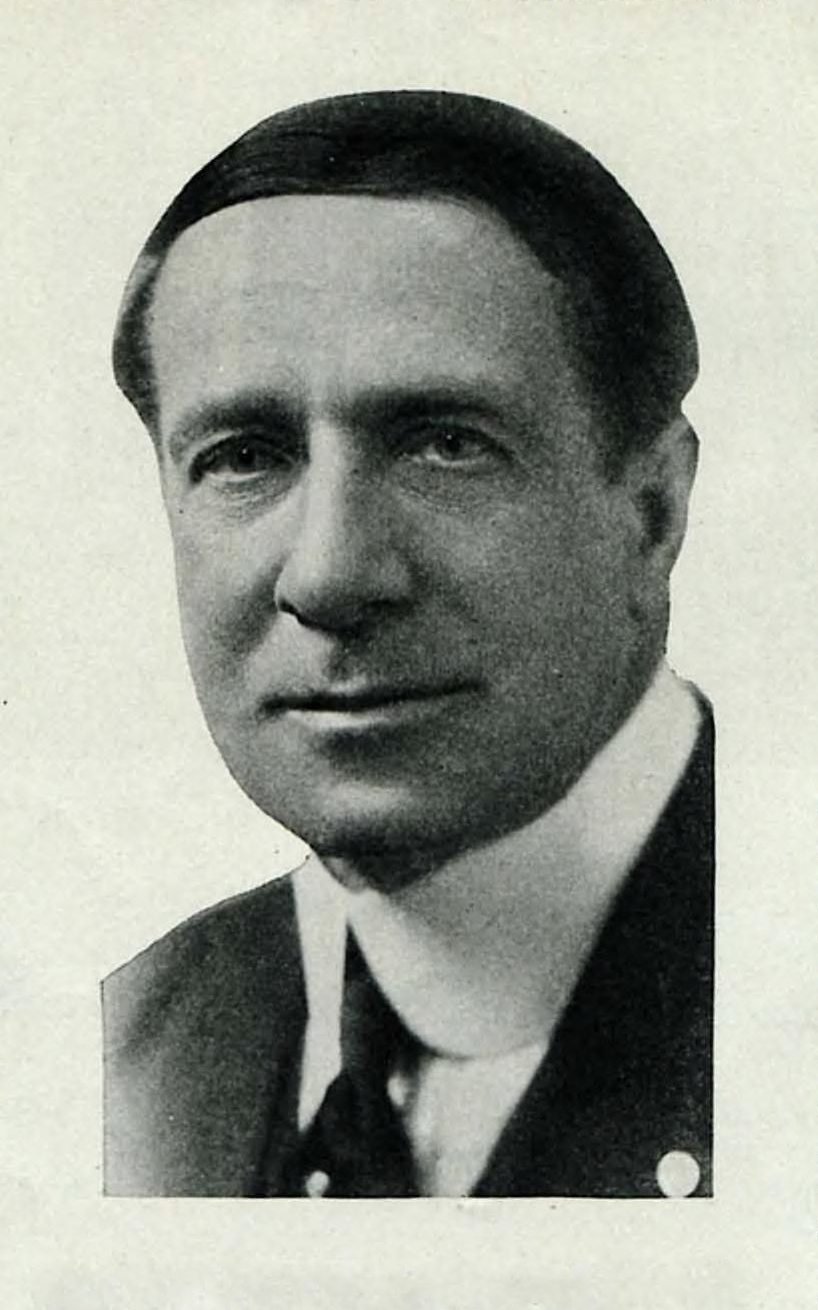

Edwin Mordant (December 22, 1868 - February 16, 1942) was an actor on stage and in films in the United States. He appeared in numerous shows between 1901 and the later 1920s.

He was married to Ola Humphrey. They divorced. The ‘’New York Dramatist’’ published a photo of him.

== Theater ==
- ‘’The Fatal Wedding’’ (1901)

== Filmography ==
- The Seven Sisters (1915) as Baron Rodviany
- A Royal Family (1915)
- The Prince and the Pauper (1915)
- Poor Little Peppina (1916) as Robert Torrens
- Molly Make-Believe (1916) as Mr. Wendell
- The Undying Flame (1917) as The King
- The Cost (1920) as Colonel Gardner
- County Fair (1937) as Mr. Brooks, Moon Glow's Owner
- Outlaws of Sonora (1938) as Banker Pierce
- Shadows Over Shanghai (1938) as Dr. Adams
