= Mystery of the Double Cross =

1917 film

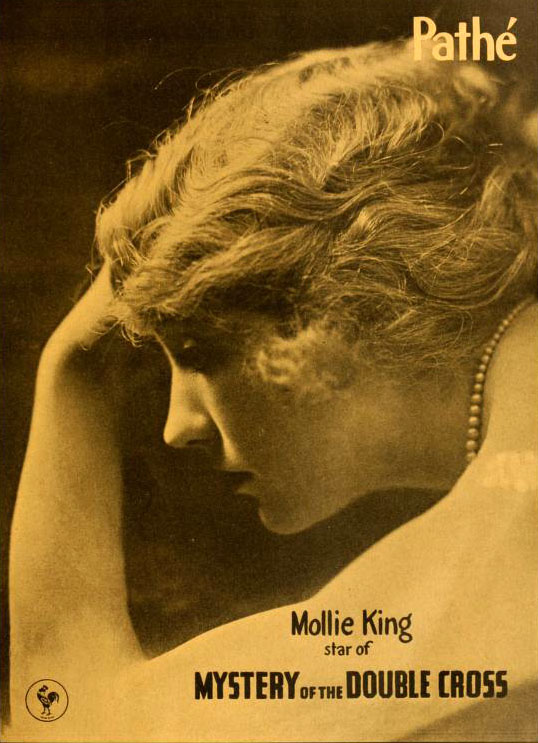
- Promotion in Moving Picture World, 1917
- Directed by: Louis J. Gasnier; William Parke
- Starring: Mollie King; Léon Bary
- Distributed by: Pathé Exchange; Astra Films
- Release date: March 18, 1917
- Running time: 15 episodes (350 minutes)
- Country: United States
- Language: Silent (English intertitles)

Mystery of the Double Cross (officially without definite article) is a 1917 film and one of the few American silent action film serials to survive in complete form. It was directed by Louis J. Gasnier and William Parke, from a story written by Gilson Willets, produced by the Astra Film Corporation and released in weekly chapters by Pathé, starting March 18, 1917.

== Plot ==
Peter Hale is returning to America from overseas via steamship to receive his inheritance. On board, he receives a telegram warning him to beware the Double Cross. He doesn't know what it means, until he becomes enamored of a mysterious woman occupying cabin no. 7. When a submarine is sighted, there is panic on shipboard. Peter and the mysterious woman are thrown together, and in the ensuing action, he sees a double cross symbol on her right arm, just below the shoulder. When the ship arrives in New York, Peter loses track of the woman.

His father's will stipulates that he is to marry a woman, "perfect in mind and body," who has been selected for him. She will reveal herself to him when the time comes, and he will know her by the sign of the double cross on her arm. If anyone else marries her, then that person will inherit the Hale fortune.

Pondering this in his hotel room, Peter overhears Bridgely Bentley, a gangster and social pirate, reveal a plan to bilk Herbert Brewster out of some valuable land. Brewster is unaware that there are valuable oil reserves beneath the land. Peter knows Brewster, who was a friend of Pete's father. Peter races ahead and obtains an option on the property to keep Bridgely from carrying out his scheme, thereby earning his enmity. But Peter also finds that Brewster's daughter, Phillipa, is the woman he met on board the ship. He begins to woo her, but is puzzled by how she at times accepts his courtship, and the next minute, rejects him, claiming that they have never met. When he tries to confront her, a Masked Stranger intervenes, telling him he must be true to the girl of the Double Cross. Bentley finds the original letter sent to Peter and realizes that if he can marry the girl of the Double Cross, the Hale fortune will be his.

The rest of the serial plays variations on these conflicts. Rather than traditional cliffhangers—the death traps are usually foiled in the course of each episode—the chapters end on an air of mystery or tension about what exactly is going on.

== Cast ==
- Mollie King as Philippa Brewster
- Léon Bary as Peter Hale
- Ralph Stuart as Bridgey Bentley
- Gladden James as Dick Annersley
- Theodore Friebus as Jack Dunn
- Robert Brower as Herbert Brewster
- Harry L. Fraser
- Helene Chadwick
- Clarine Seymour

== Chapter titles ==
1. The Lady in Number 7
2. The Masked Stranger
3. An Hour to Live
4. Kidnapped
5. The Life Current
6. The Dead Come Back
7. Into Thin Air
8. The Stranger Disposes
9. When Jailbirds Fly
10. The Hole-n-the-Wall
11. Love's Sacrifice
12. The Riddle of the Cross
13. The Face of the Stranger
14. The Hidden Brand
15. The Double Cross

== Production ==
Chapter 1 included a prologue in which actress Mollie King was shown at home receiving a letter inviting her to participate in the film and then, just as a serial fan might, reading the story and saying, "I'd like to play that!" The image then dissolved with King becoming the glamorously dressed Philippa of the film.

== Reception ==
Like many American films of the time, Mystery of the Double Cross was subject to cuts by city and state film censorship boards. The Chicago Board of Censors required a cut from Chapter 14 of the shooting on the stairs.
