= Scandal (1917 film) =

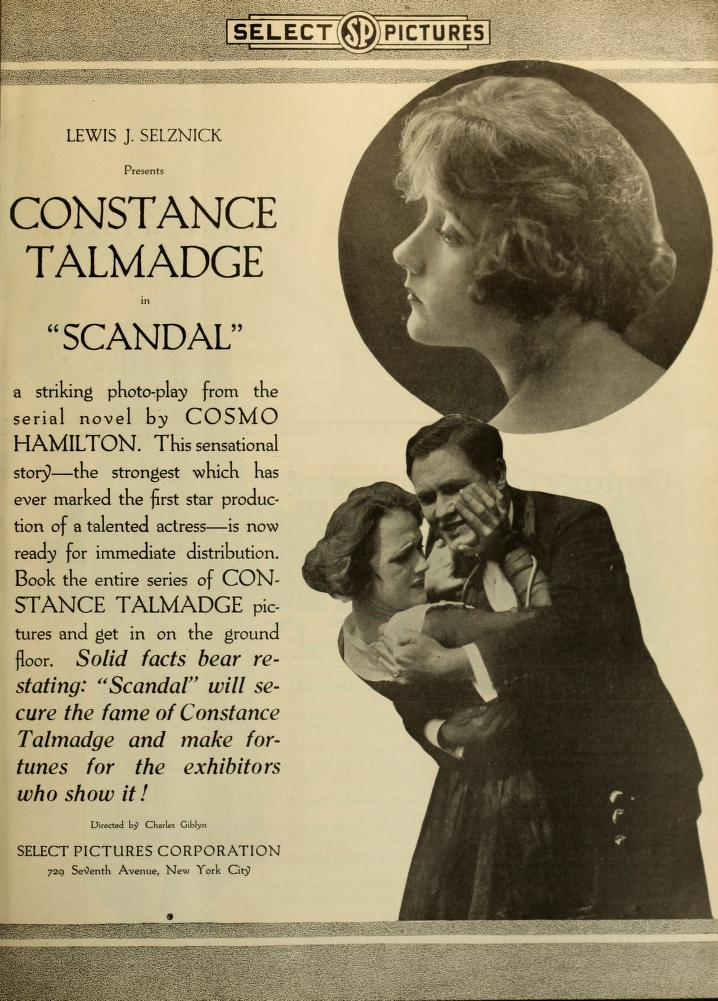
- Advertisement
- Directed by: Charles Giblyn
- Written by: Bess Meredyth; Charles Giblyn
- Based on: Novel by Cosmo Hamilton
- Cinematography: Hal Young
- Production companies: Lewis J. Selznick Enterprises; Select Pictures Corporation
- Distributed by: Select Pictures Corporation
- Release date: November 17, 1917 (U.S.)
- Running time: 60 minutes
- Country: United States
- Language: Silent (English intertitles)

Scandal is a 1917 American black and white silent comedy drama film directed by Charles Giblyn and based on a novel by Cosmo Hamilton. The film scenario is written by Bess Meredyth. It is one of the first films to star Constance Talmadge.

== Plot ==
As described in a film magazine review, Beatrice Vanderdyke, a young society woman, in order to defend her reputation, claims to be secretly married to a young man of the same station who is away on a honeymoon cruise. The parents are delighted and later send the two on a boat trip. He falls in love with her, but she does not feel the same way, so he decides to keep her on a desert island until she changes her mind. At this point they are called back home to prove their marriage, and the approaching social catastrophe makes her realize that she loves the man. They marry and set out on a real honeymoon trip.

== Cast ==
- Constance Talmadge as Beatrix Vanderdyke
- Harry C. Browne as Pelham Franklin
- J. Herbert Frank as Sutherland Yorke
- Aimee Dalmores as Ida Larpent
- Gladden James as Malcolm Fraser
- William T. Carleton as Mr. Vanderdyke
- Ida Darling as Mrs. Vanderdyke
- Mattie Ferguson as Mrs. Keane

== See also ==
- Another Scandal (1924)
