= Who's Cheating? =

- Directed by: Joseph Levering
- Written by: Dorothy Chappell
- Starring: Ralph Kellard; Zena Keefe; Montagu Love
- Distributed by: Lee-Bradford Corporation
- Release date: April 7, 1924
- Running time: 50 minutes
- Country: United States
- Languages: Silent; English intertitles

Who's Cheating? is a 1924 American silent drama film directed by Joseph Levering and starring Ralph Kellard, Zena Keefe and Montagu Love.

== Cast ==
- Dorothy Chappell as June Waugh
- Ralph Kellard as Larry Fields
- Zena Keefe as Myrtle Meers
- Montagu Love as Harrison Fields
- Marie Burke as Mrs. Fields
- William H. Tooker as John Rogers
- Frank Montgomery as Alexander Waugh
- Edward Roseman as Steve Bowman
- Marcia Harris as Mrs. Freeman

== Bibliography ==
- Nash, Jay Robert. The Motion Picture Guide 1988 Annual. Cinebooks, 1997. ISBN 978-0-933997-16-5.
