= A Soldier's Plaything =

1930 film directed by Michael Curtiz

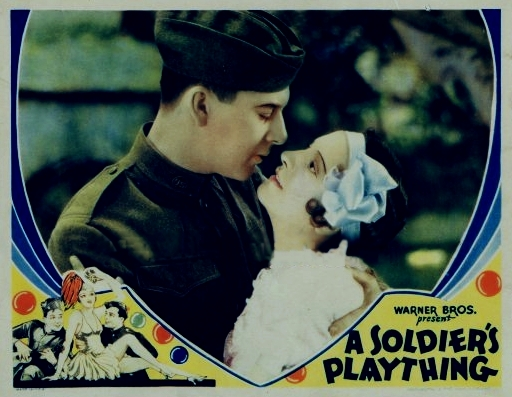
- Theatrical release poster
- Directed by: Michael Curtiz
- Written by: Arthur Caesar (dialogue)
- Screenplay by: Perry N. Vekroff
- Story by: Viña Delmar
- Starring: Ben Lyon; Harry Langdon; Lotti Loder; Noah Beery
- Cinematography: Barney McGill; J.O. Taylor
- Edited by: Jack Killifer
- Production company: Warner Bros. Pictures
- Distributed by: Warner Bros. Pictures
- Release date: November 1, 1930 (US); (limited release)
- Running time: 56 minutes 71 minutes (original)
- Country: United States
- Language: English

A Soldier's Plaything is a 1930 American pre-Code comedy-drama film with songs directed by Michael Curtiz. Warner Bros. Pictures filmed it simultaneously in 35mm and in a widescreen process called Vitascope, but it is uncertain whether the Vitascope version was ever released. The film was planned as a full-scale musical comedy, but most of the musical numbers were cut out before general release in the United States, because the public had grown tired of musicals by late 1930. This accounts for the short length of the film. The complete film was released intact in other countries where audiences still appreciated musicals. It is unknown whether a copy of the full version still exists.

== Plot ==
A Soldier's Plaything (1930)

The story takes place towards the end of the first World War. Georgie Wilson is gambling with some friends. When one of them accuses him of cheating they get into a fight. When Wilson sees his opponent fall down the stairs he assumes he has died. He escapes with his friend, Tim, before the police arrive by joining a parade of men who are enlisting for the army. They end up joining as Tim made his mind up that he wants to join the Army. They get into trouble with their captain on numerous occasions, leading him to punish them numerous times by making them stable cleaners. When they are stationed at the German town of Koblenz, Wilson meets and falls in love with Gretchen Rittner, daughter of an innkeeper. He is unable to propose marriage to her, however, with a murder charging hanging over his head. Eventually, the man he thought he murdered turns up and this allows Wilson to finally marry Gretchen.

== Cast ==
- Ben Lyon as Georgie Wilson
- Harry Langdon as Tim
- Lotti Loder as Gretchen Rittner
- Noah Beery as Captain John Plover
- Fred Kohler as Hank, poker player
- Lee Moran as Corporal Brown
- Frank Campeau as Joe, poker player

== Preservation status ==
Only copies of the cut print released in the United States (without most of the musical numbers) seem to have survived. The complete film, which had a running length of 71 minutes, was released intact in other countries where audiences still appreciated musicals. It is unknown whether a copy of the full version still exists.
