= Pearl of the Army =

1916 film

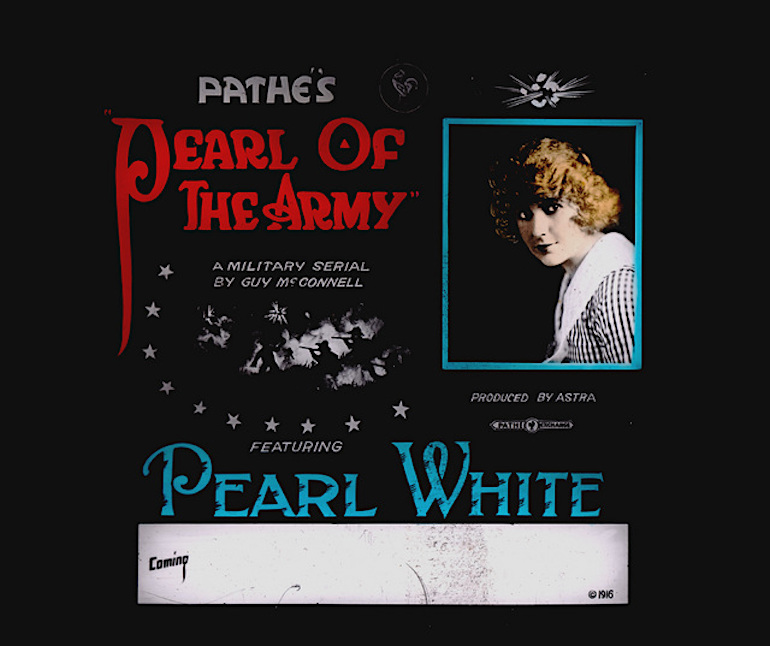
- Lantern slide
- Directed by: Edward José
- Written by: Guy McConnell
- Produced by: Astra Film Corp
- Starring: Pearl White; Ralph Kellard
- Distributed by: Pathé Exchange; Astra Films
- Release date: December 3, 1916
- Running time: 15 episodes
- Country: United States
- Language: Silent with English intertitles

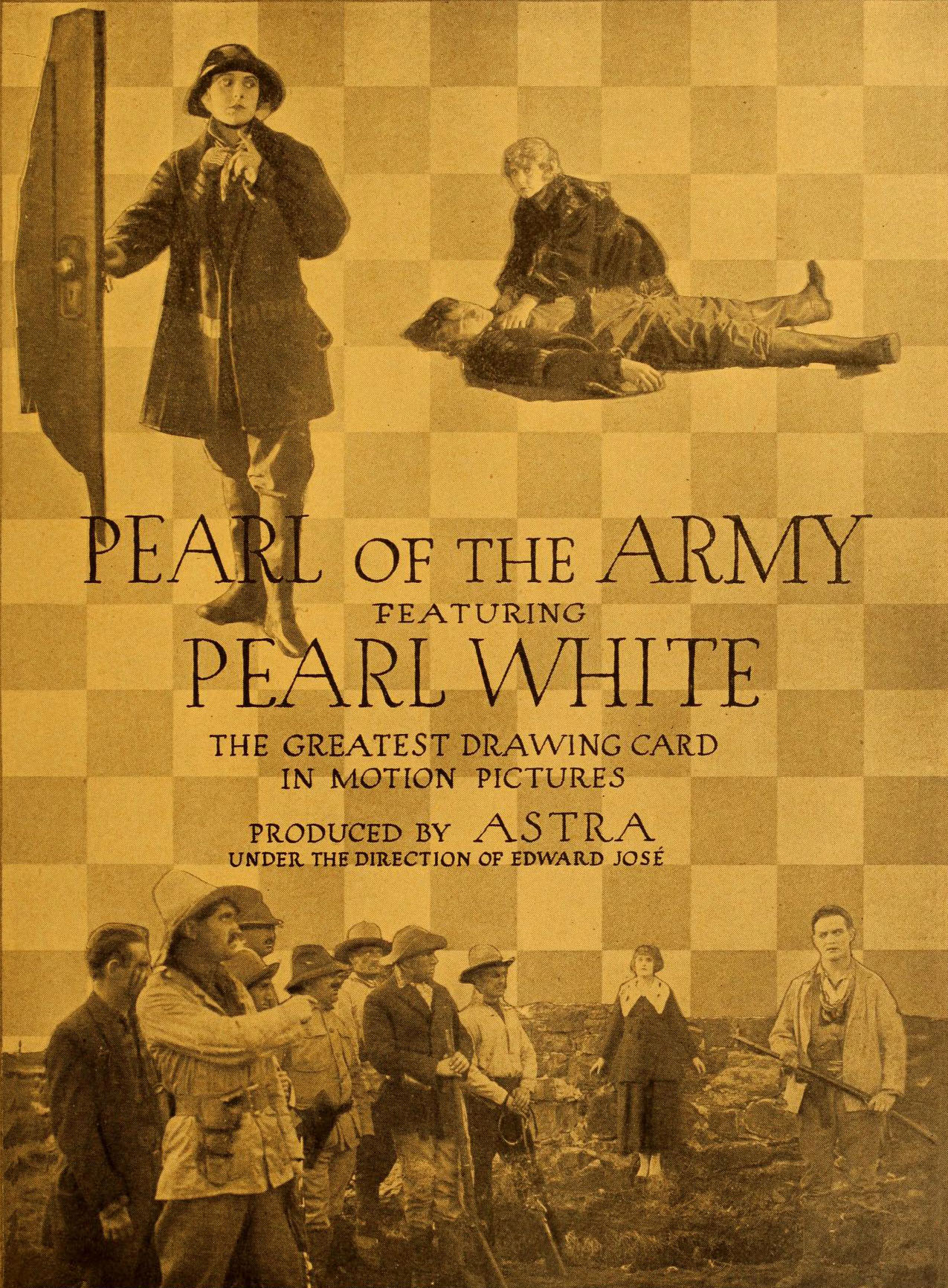
Advertisement for the film serial

Pearl of the Army is a 1916 American silent film serial directed by Edward José. The Pathé-Astra Film Corp movie was made when many early film studio and film producers in America's first motion picture industry were based in New Jersey's Hudson River towns, particularly Fort Lee. Prints and/or fragments were found in the Dawson Film Find in 1978.

== Cast ==
- Pearl White as Pearl Date
- Ralph Kellard as Captain Ralph Payne
- Marie Wayne as Bertha Bonn
- Theodore Friebus as Major Brent
- William T. Carleton as Colonel Dare (as W.T. Carleton)

== Chapter titles ==
1. The Traitor
2. Found Guilty
3. The Silent Menace
4. War Clouds
5. Somewhere In Grenada
6. Major Brent's Perfidy
7. For The Stars and Stripes
8. International Diplomacy
9. The Monroe Doctrine
10. The Silent Army
11. A Million Volunteers
12. The Foreign Alliance
13. Modern Buccaneers
14. The Flag Despoiler
15. The Colonel's Orderly

== Novelization ==
A French-language novelization in the form of 10 pamphlets based on the series was published in 1917-1918 by the famous author of the time Marcel Allain, under the general title Le courrier de Washington. Published by La Renaissance du Livre in Paris, in the cycle Collection des Romans-cinéma.
