= The Fatal Ring =

1917 film

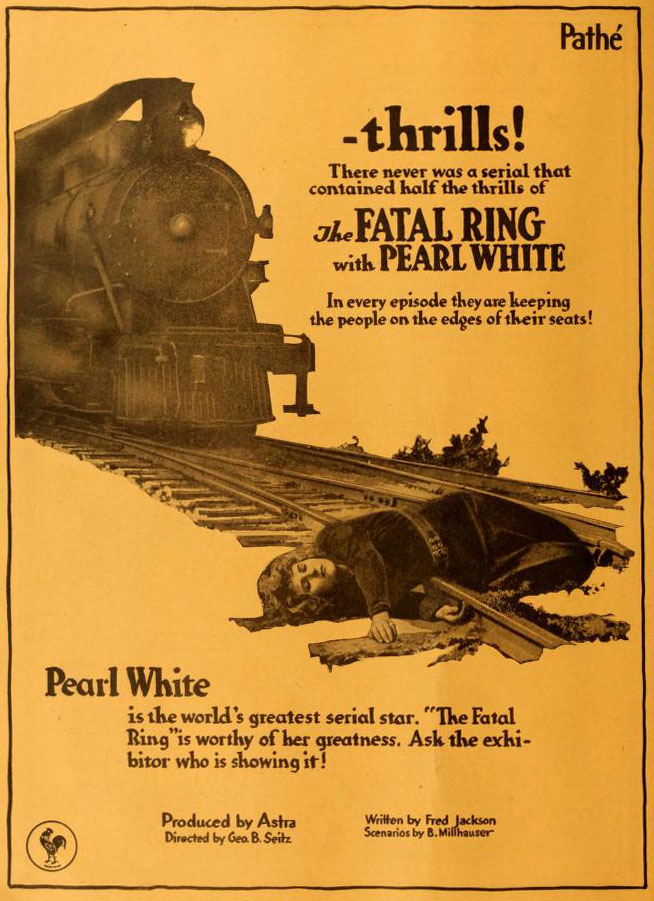
- Advertisement (1917)
- Directed by: George B. Seitz
- Written by: Frederick J. Jackson; Bertram Millhauser; George B. Seitz
- Produced by: Louis J. Gasnier
- Starring: Pearl White; Earle Foxe
- Production company: Astra Films
- Distributed by: Pathé Exchange
- Release date: July 8, 1917
- Running time: 20 episodes (2 reels each)
- Country: United States
- Language: Silent (English intertitles)

The Fatal Ring is a 1917 American action film serial directed by George B. Seitz. Silentera.com reports that the UCLA Film & Television Archive may have a complete print. A deteriorating fragment roll containing a scene is discovered in France by Australian filmmaker Robert Hoskins in 2021 who then scanned it and uploaded it to his YouTube channel.

== Cast ==
- Pearl White as Violet Standish
- Earle Foxe as Nicholas Knox
- Warner Oland as Richard Carslake
- Ruby Hoffman as The Priestess
- Henry G. Sell as Tom Carlton
- Floyd Buckley
- Cesare Gravina
- Mattie Ferguson
- Richard LaMarr
- Bert Starkey
- L.J. O'Connor (credited as Louis J. O'Connor)
- Harriet Reller
- George B. Seitz as Undetermined Role (uncredited)

== Chapter titles ==
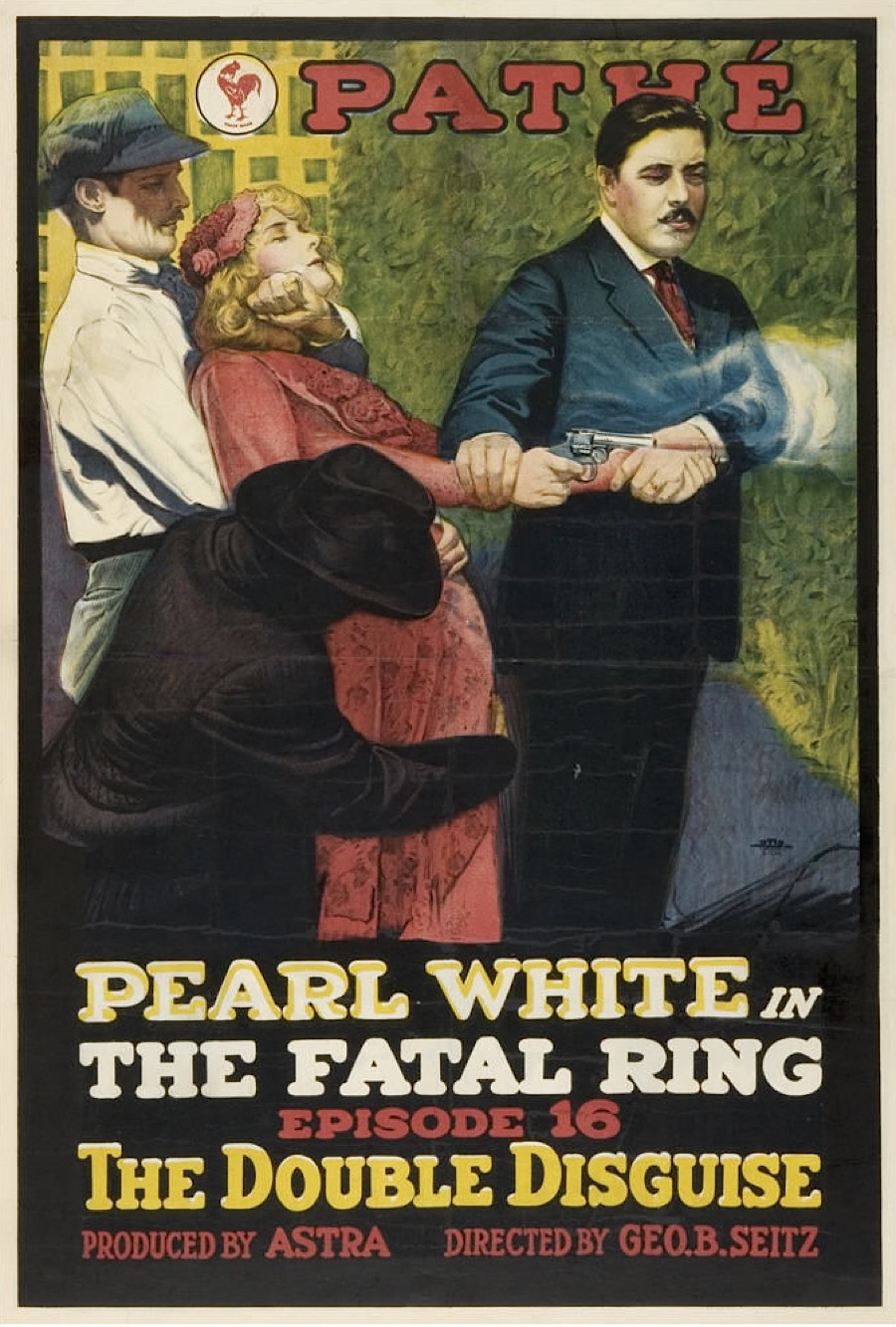
Film poster

1. The Violet Diamond
2. The Crushing Walls
3. Borrowed Identity
4. The Warning On The Ring
5. Danger Underground
6. Rays of Death
7. The Signal Lantern
8. The Switch In The Safe
9. The Dice of Death
10. The Perilous Plunge
11. The Short Circuit
12. A Desperate Chance
13. A Dash of Arabia
14. The Painted Safe
15. The Dagger Duel
16. The Double Disguise
17. The Death Weight
18. The Subterfuge
19. The End of The Trail

== Reception ==
Like many American films of the time, The Fatal Ring was subject to cuts by city and state film censorship boards. The Chicago Board of Censors required these cuts in the following chapters of the serial: Chapter 1, Reel 2, the stabbing of man after theft of diamonds, man thrusting knife to stab man not in picture, and stabbing young man in snow, Reel 3, the intertitle starting with "The first move means death" and the two holdup scenes following, four slugging scenes, and choking of girl; Chapter 2, slugging of reporter; Chapter 3, the striking of girl on head with bottle and the throwing of policeman overboard; Chapter 4, lashing of man, three scenes of threatening girl with gun, and two shooting scenes; Chapter 5, Carslake slugging reporter, bumping reporter's head against wall, all scenes of man impersonating officer holding up Knox girl in room, fight scenes, and intertitle "Whether the diamond is recovered or not - you die"; Chapter 6, all scenes of girl suspended over cauldron of boiling oil except flash of one scene, gagging girl, throwing man in tank, and the intertitle "Knox must die tonight"; Chapter 7, holdup, binding, and choking of reporter, attack and choking of girl on stairway, attack on jailer, passing of money, intertitle starting with "She is Violet Standish", binding reporter to chair, and holdup of girl in car; Chapter 8, the intertitles "At the point of a pistol," etc., and "These tricks avail you nothing", four holdup scenes at automobile, threatening reporter in chair, two choking scenes, two scenes of "The Spider" pouring acid on bars at window, three torture scenes, taking diamond from footstool, shooting servant, three fight scenes, Carslake holding up chauffeur, intertitle starting with "With the ransom I'll get," and two holdup scenes; Chapter 9, intertitle "Why should we do away with her, when we can get a big ransom", gang wrapping girl in rug, attack on Carslake in priestess' room, two scenes of man threatening Carslake with dagger, three intertitles "I'll give you the diamond, but I must have the girl", "Them's the boss's words. If I'm not back by three, croak her", and "If I'm not back to my people by three, the girl dies", man shooting at car tires, and man stabbing figure on couch; Chapter 10, three scenes of holdup of reporter, two scenes of man and girl struggling on floor, taking diamonds, overpowering reporter, binding and gagging reporter, and gang setting fire to cabin; Chapter 12, scene of man forcing girl on table; Chapter 14, four scenes of safe drilling; Chapter 15, two closeups of choking girl, stealing diamonds, fight scene where dagger is thrown, and shooting girl; Chapter 18, Reel 1, all holdup scenes to where Pearl overpowers girl, Reel 2, snatching money from shipping clerk, five holdup scenes to where man falls, two scenes of holdup of girl, and two scenes of holdup of Pearl. and Chapter 19, Reel 1, two holdup scenes, shorten fight scene between Spider and Carslake, action of Carslake slugging Spider, actual slugging of Spider, throwing him over roof and body striking the ground, two scenes of Spider shooting, slugging Carslake, intertitles "You will never trouble us again" and "Refuse and the next shot will be at your eyes", three holdup scenes by the Priestess, Reel 2, three scenes of holdup of Pearl, three scenes of holdup of servants, stealing from Pearl, holdup of Pearl on rocks, and shooting man in the hand.
