= The Cost (1920 film) =

1920 film by Harley Knoles

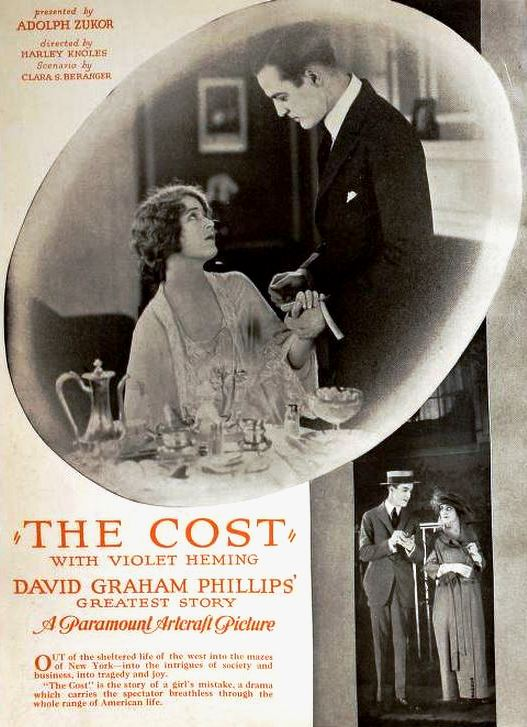
- Ad for film
- Directed by: Harley Knoles
- Screenplay by: Clara Beranger; David Graham Phillips
- Produced by: Adolph Zukor
- Starring: Violet Heming; Edwin Mordant; Jane Jennings; Ralph Kellard; Edward Arnold; Clifford Grey
- Cinematography: Philip Hatkin
- Production companies: Artcraft Pictures Corporation; Famous Players–Lasky Corporation
- Distributed by: Paramount Pictures
- Release date: April 11, 1920
- Running time: ca 1 hour
- Country: United States
- Language: Silent (English intertitles)

The Cost is a 1920 American silent drama film directed by Harley Knoles and written by Clara Beranger and David Graham Phillips. The film stars Violet Heming, Edwin Mordant, Jane Jennings, Ralph Kellard, Edward Arnold, and Clifford Grey. The movie was based on a 1904-novel by David Graham Phillips.

== Cast ==
- Violet Heming as Pauline Gardner
- Edwin Mordant as Colonel Gardner
- Jane Jennings as Mrs. Gardner
- Ralph Kellard as John Dumont
- Edward Arnold as Hampden Scarborough
- Clifford Grey as William Fanshaw Jr.
- Carlotta Monterey as Leonora Fanshaw
- Aileen Pringle as Olivia
- Warburton Gamble as Mowbray Langdon
- Florence McGuire as Suzanne
- Julia Hurley as Grandma

== Preservation ==
With no prints of The Cost located in any film archives, it is considered a lost film.
