= Upside Down (1919 film) =

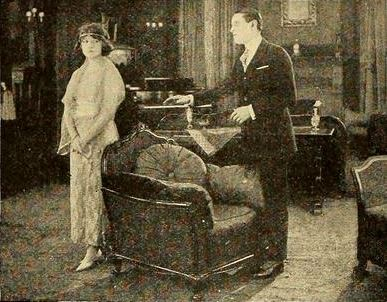
- Directed by: Lawrence C. Windom
- Written by: George Agnew Chamberlain
- Starring: Taylor Holmes; Anna Lehr; Roy Applegate
- Cinematography: George Peters
- Production company: Triangle Film Corporation
- Distributed by: Triangle Distributing
- Release date: June 22, 1919
- Country: United States
- Languages: Silent; English intertitles

Upside Down is a 1919 American silent comedy film directed by Lawrence C. Windom and starring Taylor Holmes, Anna Lehr and Roy Applegate.

== Cast ==
- Taylor Holmes as Archibald Pim
- Anna Lehr as Juliet Pim
- Roy Applegate as James Wortley Tammers
- Ruby Hoffman as Mrs. Tammers
- Harry Lee as Swami

== Bibliography ==
- Goble, Alan. The Complete Index to Literary Sources in Film. Walter de Gruyter, 1999.
