= The House of Hate =

1918 film serial

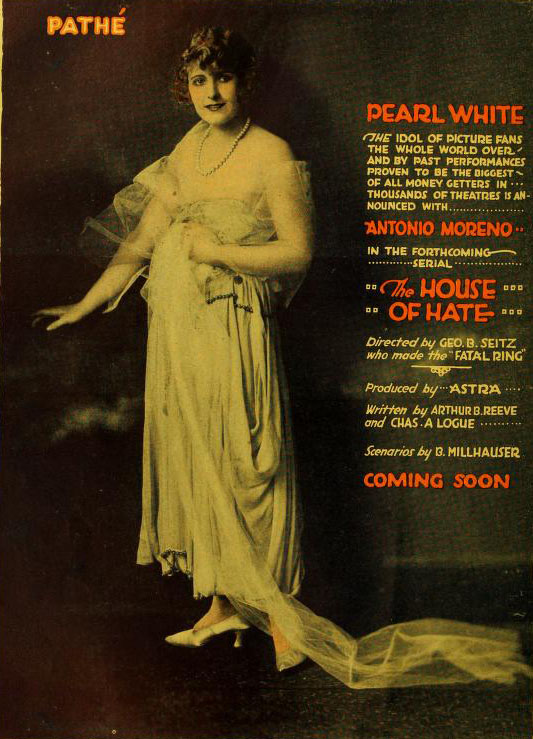
- Advert for the film serial with Pearl White
- Directed by: George B. Seitz
- Screenplay by: Bertram Millhauser
- Story by: Arthur B. Reeve; Charles Logue
- Starring: Pearl White; Antonio Moreno
- Cinematography: Arthur Charles Miller; Harry Hardy
- Production company: Astra Film Corporation
- Distributed by: Pathé Exchange
- Release date: March 10, 1918
- Running time: 20 episodes
- Country: United States
- Language: Silent (English intertitles)

The House of Hate is a 1918 American film serial directed by George B. Seitz, produced when many early film studios in America's first motion picture industry were based in Fort Lee, New Jersey.

The serial was originally announced at fifteen episodes but due to its box office success was extended to twenty, at which time content involving German spies was interpolated into the murder mystery plot.

A print of a condensed featurized version of The House of Hate from the collection of filmmaker Sergei Eisenstein is held in the Gosfilmofond film archive in Russia. Most of the propagandistic spy content is excised in the condensation, which does not include chapter divisions but does apparently include most of the content of episodes 1-4 as originally released, highlights from the middle chapters of the serial, and the complete finale including the extended flashback in which the masked villain's identity is revealed. On April 12, 2015 the Fort Lee Film Commission held a screening of a video transfer of existing footage from this film lasting three hours, including shots of Pearl White atop Cliffhanger Point on the Hudson Palisades.

A restored version of the serial with reconstructed opening titles, dialogue, chapter summaries, and chapter divisions was released on DVD by The Serial Squadron on May 25, 2015.

Lobby card

== Plot ==
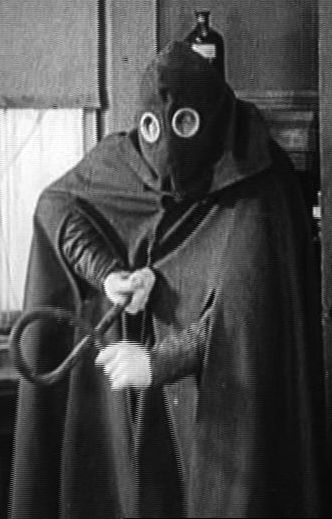
The hooded villain

Shortly after Winthrop Waldron, munitions magnate and head of the house of Waldon, arranges for the betrothal of his only heir, his adopted daughter Pearl, to her cousin so that control of his munitions empire will remain in the family, he is mysteriously murdered by a black-cowled killer who has sworn an oath of hate against him and Pearl. With Waldron's death, Pearl becomes the owner of America's largest munitions factory - the Waldon War Works. Harry Gresham, a young scientist/engineer, is in love with Pearl, and after the betrothal she finds that she regards him more highly than she does her cousin. Another cousin, Naomi, is in love with Gresham and does her best to block his efforts to win Pearl.

With Gresham's help, Pearl must fend off repeated, wildly violent and merciless attacks on her life by the masked man throughout the serial. All the living Waldon relatives, including another brother, Ezra, seem to be scheming at one time or another to deprive Pearl of her inheritance, but which, if any of the three, is really the masked maniac who threatens her life? Pearl and Harry receive and investigate mysterious messages from someone who purports to know the identity of the killer, and eventually team up and attempt to infiltrate the underworld, using false identities and enduring (literal) cliff-hanging ordeals in order to try and unmask and defeat the Hooded Terror and his gang of crooks.

== Cast ==
- Pearl White as Pearl Grant (Waldon) / Jenny Acton
- Antonio Moreno as Harvey "Harry" Gresham
- John Webb Dillion as Haynes Waldon
- Paul Clerget as Ezra Waldon
- Peggy Shanor as Naomi Waldon
- Floyd Buckley as Waldon brother
- Helene Chadwick as Queenie Kate
- J.H. Gilmour as Winthrop Waldon (credited as John Gilmour)
- Louis Wolheim as Patch-eye Pete
- Paul Panzer as Death Row Warden
- Joe Cuny
- Ruby Hoffman

== Chapter titles ==
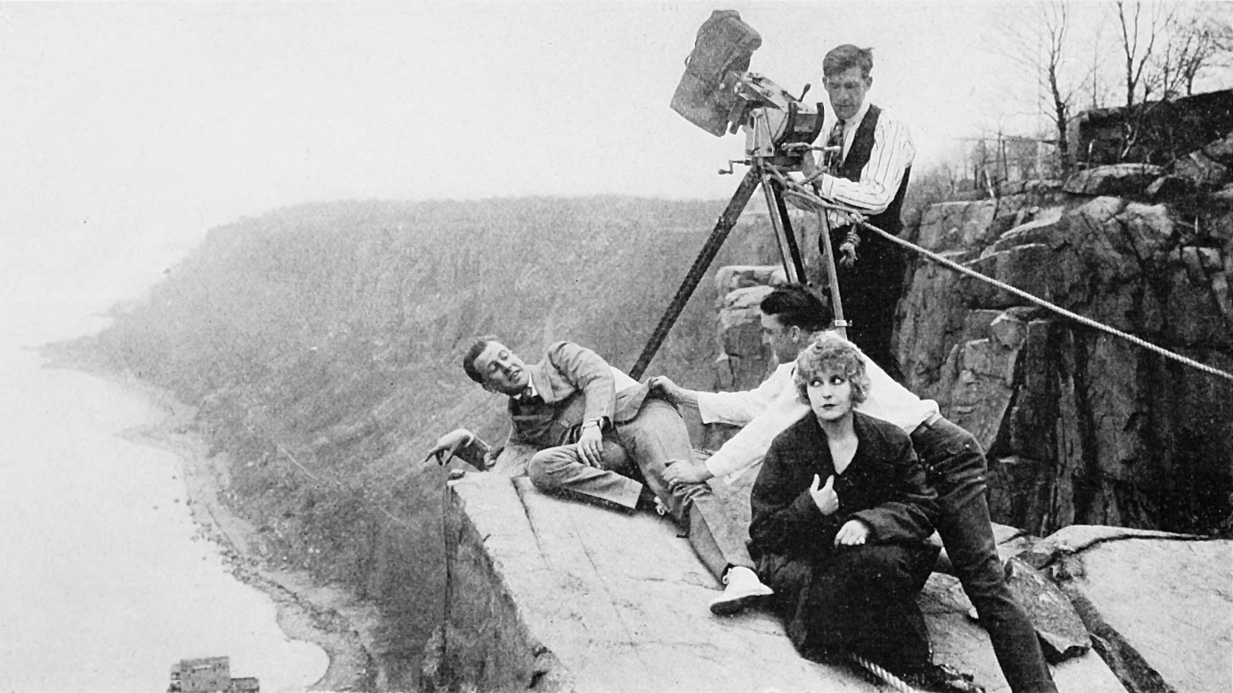
Pearl White, Antonio Moreno, director George B. Seitz, and cinematographer Arthur Charles Miller at Cliffhanger Point on the Hudson Palisades

1. The Hooded Terror
2. The Tiger's Eye
3. A Woman's Perfidy
4. The Man from Java
5. Spies Within
6. A Living Target
7. Germ Menace
8. The Untold Secret
9. Poisoned Darts
10. Double Crossed
11. Haunts of Evil
12. Flashes in the Dark
13. Enemy Aliens
14. Underworld Allies
15. The False Signal
16. The Vial of Death
17. The Death Switch
18. At the Pistol's Point
19. The Hooded Terror Unmasked
20. Following Old Glory

== Censorship ==
Like many American films of the time, The House of Hate was subject to cuts by city and state film censorship boards.

For example, the Chicago Board of Censors cut the following:

- In Chapter 1, Reel 2, the dagger descending on Walden's back, Reel 3, knocking down motorcycle policeman, and the masked man shooting guard and guard falling;
- In Chapter 2, Reel 1, two intertitles "Detective Herrick, the masked man killed two guards and got away" and "It means that whoever murdered Walden marked Pearl for his next victim", masked man in recess ready to slug guard with gun, Reel 2, the intertitle "From the secret passageway comes the 'Hooded Terror,' murderer of Pearl's father and would-be murderer of Pearl";
- In Chapter 3, Reel 1, closeup of a $10 bill;
- In Chapter 7, Reel 1, scene of infecting stationery with germs, Reel 2, man throwing knife, three scenes of knife sticking in man, four scenes of Hooded Terror forcing young woman's head to floor;
- In Chapter 8, Reel 1, Hooded Terror striking man on head with iron, throwing man down stairs, Reel 2, holdup scene, binding man and young woman, Hooded Terror throwing man down stairs;
- In Chapter 9, Reel 2, the shooting of poisoned arrow, shooting of Harvey, throwing man into vat of acid, and the placing of dynamite;
- In Chapter 10, Reel 1, young woman shooting man standing inside house, man prying window open, all but last scene of man working on safe, Reel 2, crook knocking policeman down, man tripping and knocking officer down in alley, crooks slugging butler and binding him, and crooks knocking police officer down in fight;
- In Chapter 11, Reel 1, young woman striking the butler on the head;
- In Chapter 12, Reel 2, second scene of attack on chauffeur where men carry him away;
- In Chapter 14, Reel 1, last two scenes of knife in boy's back, Reel 2, two scenes of slugging man and throwing him into river, all scenes of shooting policemen, and slugging of young woman;
- In Chapter 15, Reel 1, attack on policeman by Hooded Terror to include slugging, all scenes showing Hooded Terror holding up physician except first one and the one in which he is shown binding man's hand, and first view of physician on floor after attack;
- In Chapter 16, Reel 1, scene of Hooded Terror setting off explosive and shooting at police and, Reel 2, three attack scenes on nurse;
- In Chapter 18, a closeup of currency;
- In Chapter 19, Reel 1, sequence with masked man beating other man on floor, first scene of choking Pearl, throwing young woman off bridge, Reel 2, all scenes of maid telling men of criminal assault including subtitles up to where she is being choked in hallway, and man taking match from pocket and scaling barn wall.

== See also ==
- List of incomplete or partially lost films
