= Ralph Kellard =

American actor

Ralph Kellard (June 16, 1883 - 1955) was an actor in the U.S. who appeared in theatrical productions and films. His film work included leading roles in several films such as The Shielding Shadow (1916), The Restless Sex (1920) and The Cost (film). His son Robert Kellard also became an actor. His other son, Thomas Kellard was also an actor and then became a Vice President at Lockheed Shipbuilding and Construction in Seattle, Washington. Ralph's grandson's from Thomas, Phil and Rick Kellard, are both television writers and producers. His great grandson, Matthew Kellard is a screenwriter.

He was born Thomas J. J. Kelly in New York City.

Kellard was referred to as a popular local matinee idol of the Auditorium Stock Company in Kansas when he returned on screen in a showing of The Cost (film) in 1920. In 1915 Kellard was voted the second most handsome film star, and shown in a photograph of "this month's prominent film stars" in Motion Picture Classic.

Kellard appeared in the French language publication Mon Ciné on June 28, 1923. Images of Kellard are available at GettyImages, The Wisconsin Historical Society, and The Silent Film Still Archive.

Kellard ate a mostly fruit diet and caused slip and fall problems leaving fruit peels and other bits of fruit waste around studio sets.

== Theater ==
- The Warrens of Virginia (play) (1907), as Gen. Carr
- Rebecca of Sunnybrook Farm (play) (1907)
- The Second Tanqueray starring Tallulah Bankhead at the Amerhurst Drama Festival in 1940.
- The Skin of Our Teeth (1942)

== Filmography ==
- Her Mother's Secret (1915)
- The Precious Parcel (1916)
- The Shielding Shadow (1916), a serial
- Pearl of the Army (1916), a serial, as Captain
- The Hillcrest Mystery (1918), as Gordon Brett
- A Scream in the Night (1919)
- The Restless Sex (1920), as Jim Cleland
- The Cost (film) (1920), as John Dumont
- The Master Mind (1920 film), as Wainwright
- Veiled Marriage (1920)
- Love, Hate and a Woman (1921)
- Who's Cheating? (1924), Larry Fields
- Virtuous Liars (1924), as Jack Banton
- Women Everywhere (1930), as Michael Kopulos
