= Bucking the Line =

1921 film

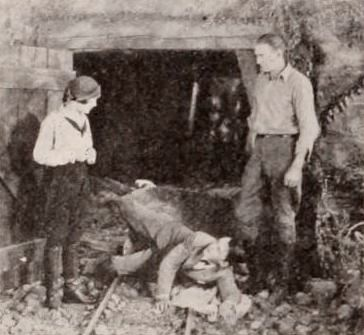
- Directed by: Carl Harbaugh
- Written by: Francis Lynde (novel)
- Produced by: William Fox
- Starring: Maurice 'Lefty' Flynn; Molly Malone; Kathryn McGuire
- Cinematography: Frank B. Good
- Production company: Fox Film Corporation
- Distributed by: Fox Film Corporation
- Release date: November 6, 1921
- Running time: 50 minutes
- Country: United States
- Languages: Silent; English intertitles

Bucking the Line is a 1921 American silent drama film directed by Carl Harbaugh and starring Maurice 'Lefty' Flynn, Molly Malone and Kathryn McGuire.

== Cast ==
- Maurice 'Lefty' Flynn as John Montague Smith
- Molly Malone as Corona Baldwin
- Norman Selby as Jerry
- Edwin B. Tilton as Colonel Dexter Baldwin
- Kathryn McGuire as Vera Richlander
- J. Farrell MacDonald as Dave Kinsey
- Jim Farley as Watrous Dunham
- Leslie Casey as Tucker Jibbey
- George Kerby as Rand Barlow

== Bibliography ==
- Connelly, Robert B. The Silents: Silent Feature Films, 1910-36, Volume 40, Issue 2. December Press, 1998.
- Munden, Kenneth White. The American Film Institute Catalog of Motion Pictures Produced in the United States, Part 1. University of California Press, 1997.
