= The Lightning Raider =

1919 film

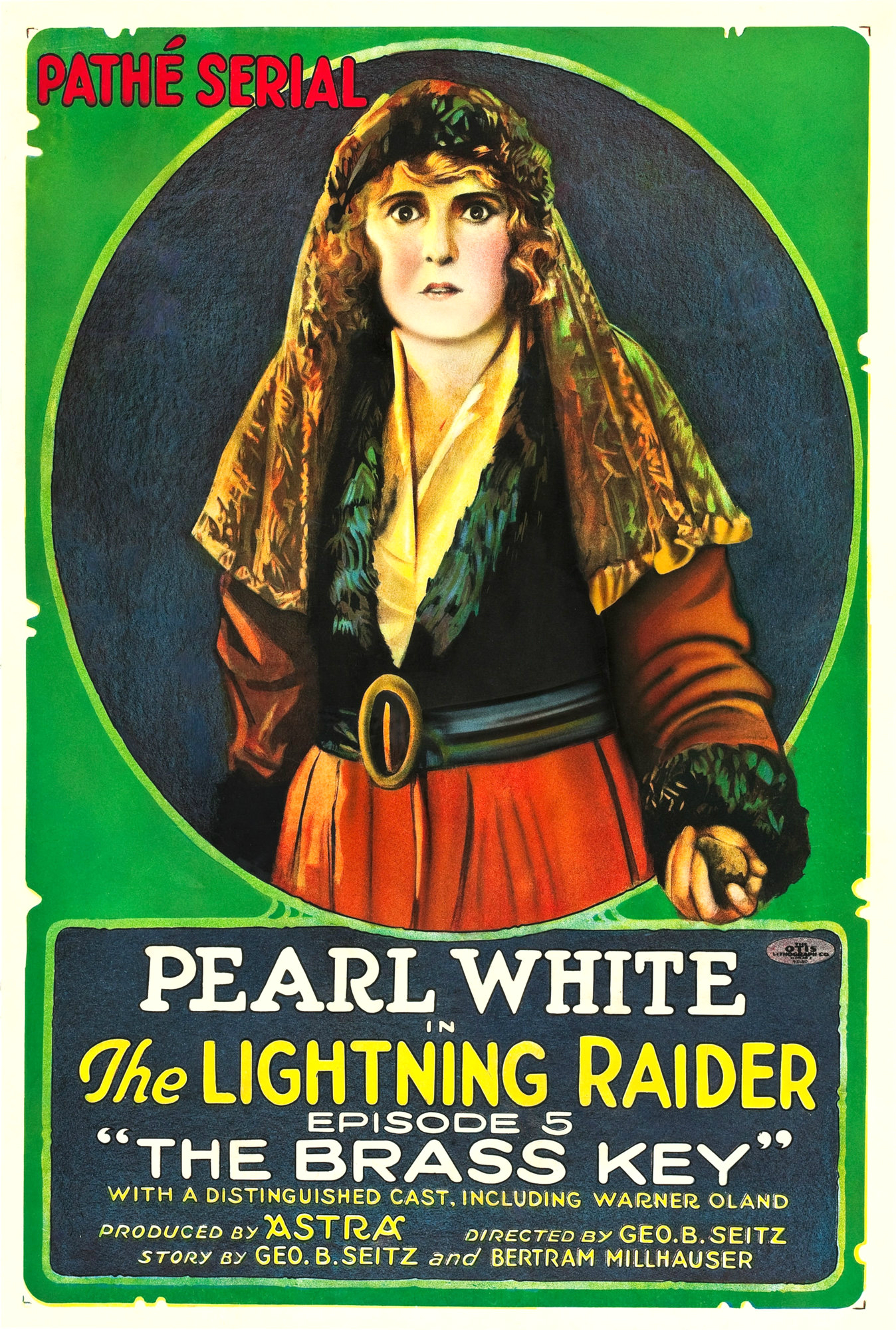
- Film poster
- Directed by: George B. Seitz
- Written by: John B. Clymer; Charles W. Goddard; George B. Seitz
- Based on: stories written by May Yohe
- Produced by: Pathe Pictures
- Starring: Pearl White; Warner Oland; Boris Karloff
- Distributed by: Pathé Exchange; Astra Films
- Release date: January 15, 1919
- Running time: 300 minutes
- Country: United States
- Language: Silent (English intertitles)

The Lightning Raider is a 1919 American action film serial directed by George B. Seitz. It was the on-screen debut of Boris Karloff, albeit as an extra. The film serial survives in an incomplete state with some reels preserved at the Library of Congress Public Archives of Canada/Dawson City collection and other film archives, but it is not available on home video. The serial was shown in France as Par Amour.

== Plot ==
A beautiful young woman is in reality a daring master thief. While fleeing the scene of her latest robbery, she meets a handsome young millionaire named Thomas Babbington North. The film belongs to the sensationalistic "Yellow Peril" genre of its time, with Warner Oland playing the insidious Oriental Wu Fang.

== Cast ==
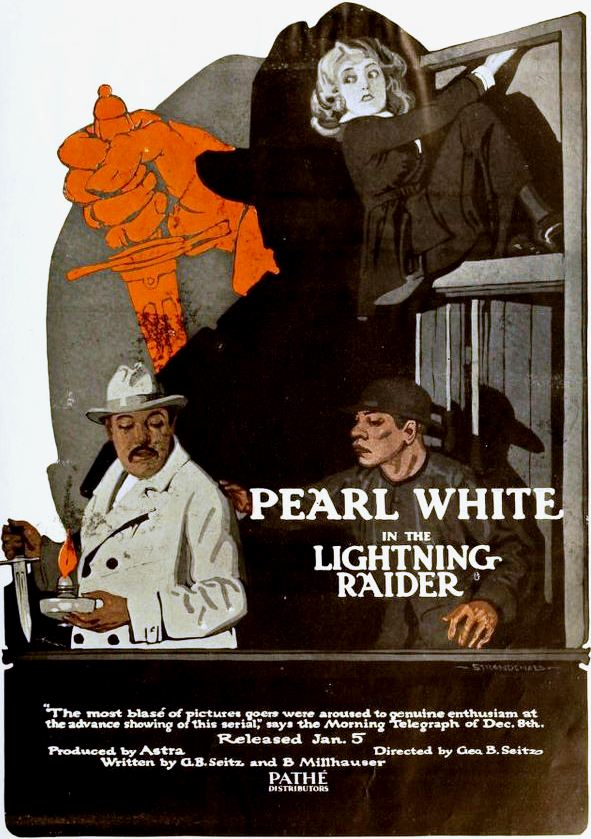
Ad for film

- Pearl White as The Lightning Raider
- Warner Oland as Wu Fang
- Henry G. Sell as Thomas Babbington North
- Ruby Hoffman as Lottie
- William P. Burt as The Wasp (credited as William Burt)
- Frank Redman as Hop Sing
- Nellie Burt as Sunbeam
- Sam Kim
- Henrietta Simpson
- Boris Karloff as an extra
- Billy Sullivan (credited as William A. Sullivan)
- Anita Brown

== Episodes ==
1. The Ebony Block
2. The Counterplot
3. Underworld Terrors
4. Through Doors of Steel
5. The Brass Key
6. The Mystic Box
7. Meshes of Evil
8. Cave of Dread
9. Falsely Accused
10. The Baited Trap
11. The Bars of Death
12. Hurled Into Space
13. The White Roses
14. Cleared of Guilt
15. Wu Fang Atones

== See also ==
- List of film serials
- List of film serials by studio
- Boris Karloff filmography
