= Perry N. Vekroff =

American film director

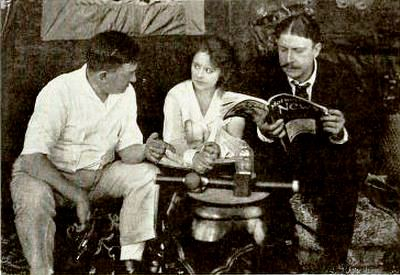
- Vekroff with Frankie Mann and Stuart Holmes (reading the Motion Picture News) during production of Trailed by Three (1920)
- Born: June 3, 1881; Shumen, Bulgaria
- Died: January 3, 1937 (aged 55); Hollywood, California, United States
- Occupations: Film director, screenwriter, actor
- Years active: 1914–1922

Perry N. Vekroff (June 3, 1881 – January 3, 1937) was an American film director, screenwriter and actor of the silent era. He directed 19 films between 1914 and 1922, including two film serials for the Universal Film Manufacturing Company and one for Pathé. He was born in Shumen, Bulgaria and died in Hollywood, California.

== Selected filmography ==
- Three Weeks (1914)
- Richard the Brazen (1917)
- The Question (1917 film)
- Men (1918)
- A Woman's Experience (1919)
- In Honor's Web (1919)
- Trailed by Three (1920)
- The Secret Four (1921)
- Perils of the Yukon (1922)
- Thundergate (1923)
- What Wives Want (1923)
- A Soldier's Plaything (1930)
