= A Woman's Experience =

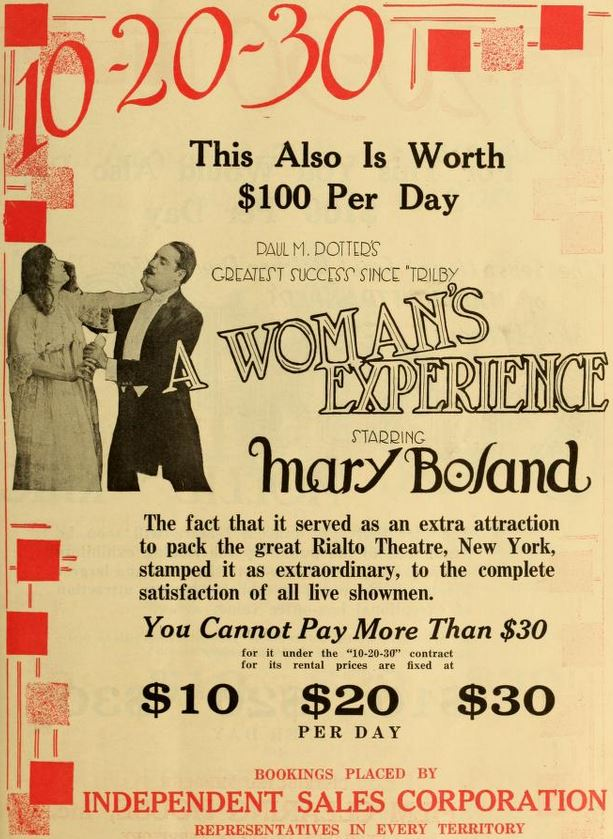
- Advertisement
- Directed by: Perry N. Vekroff
- Written by: Perry N. Vekroff
- Based on: Agnes by Paul M. Potter
- Produced by: Gerald F. Bacon
- Starring: Sam Hardy; Mary Boland
- Cinematography: Edward C. Earle
- Production company: Bacon-Backer Film Corp.
- Distributed by: Independent Sales Corp.
- Release date: January 1919
- Running time: 6 reels
- Country: United States
- Language: Silent (English intertitles)

A Woman's Experience is a 1919 American silent drama film directed by Perry N. Vekroff and starring Sam Hardy and Mary Boland. It was filmed in 1918 and released in early 1919. This film is preserved by the Library of Congress.

== Plot ==
As described in a film magazine, growing tired of the monotonous country life, George Roydant and his wife Agnes move to the city, where they become involved in financial difficulties after the husband has an affair with an adventuress, Attlie Damuron. Agnes' name becomes coupled with that of a Count, and when she learns of her husband's duplicity, she turns to the Count. The Count attempts to force his attentions on her and in his excitement accidentally drinks a cup of poison and dies in her room. She is saved from being suspected in his death because of a note found in the room. George and Agnes realize their mistakes and go back to the quiet and peace of the country.

== Cast ==
- Sam Hardy as George Roydant
- Mary Boland as Agnes Roydant
- Lawrence McGill as Nicholas Barrable
- Robert Cain as Lord Sulgrave
- Corrine Uzzell as Attlie Damuron
- Bradley Barker as Rufford

== Reception ==
Variety's review was largely positive, praising the intertitles for pushing the story forward effectively, concluding the review by stating that the film has "all the elements which will appeal."
