= Motion Picture News =

American film industry paper

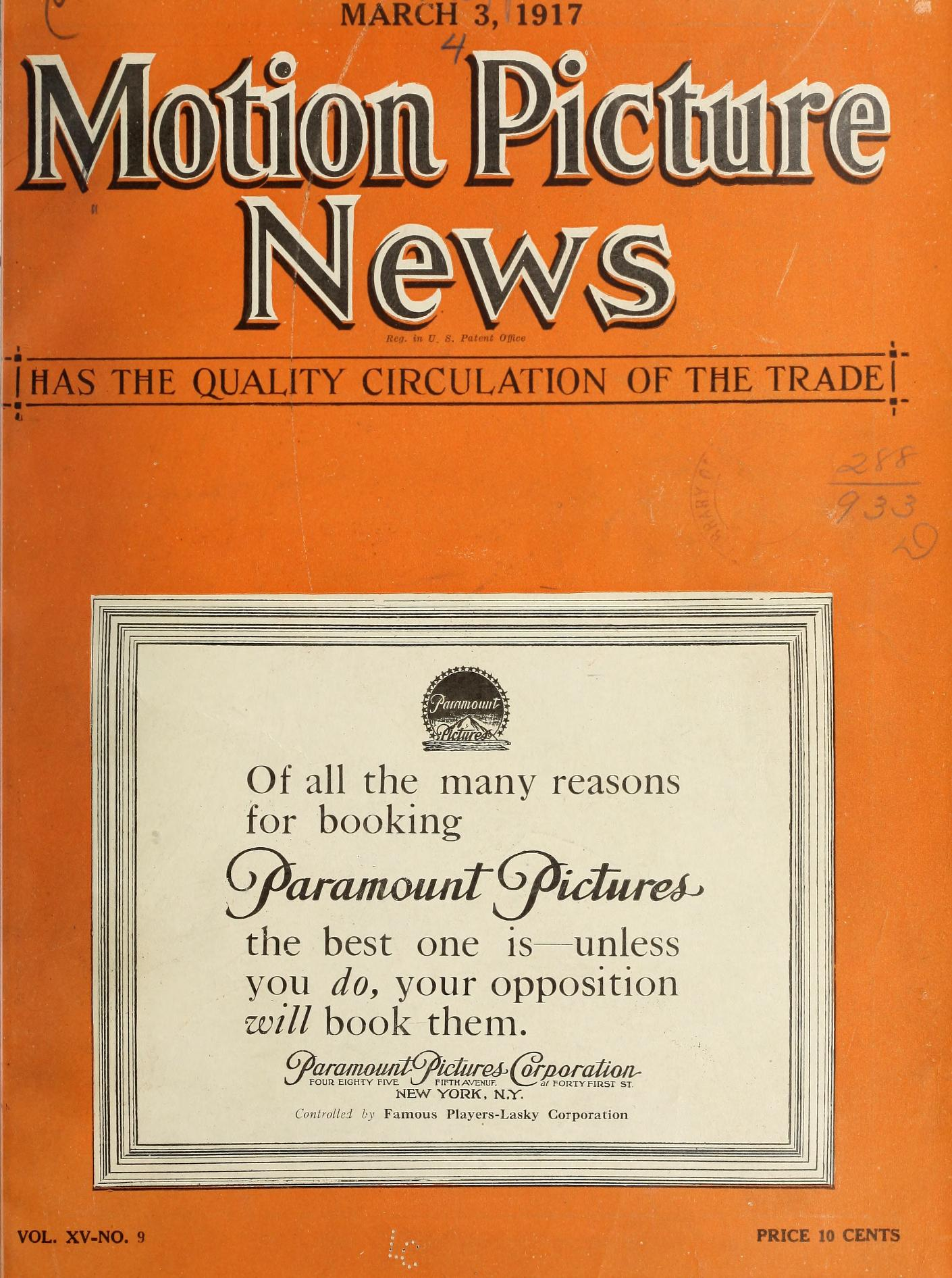
- Cover from March 1917
- Categories: Entertainment
- Frequency: Weekly
- Publisher: William A. Johnston
- First issue: September 1913; 112 years ago
- Company: Exhibitors' Time Inc.
- Country: United States
- Based in: New York City, U.S.
- Language: English

The Motion Picture News was an American film industry trade paper published from 1913 to 1930.

== History ==
The publication was created through the 1913 merger of the Moving Picture News founded in 1908 and the Exhibitors' Times, founded earlier in 1913.

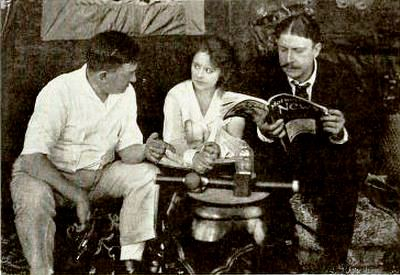
Director Perry N. Vekroff and actors Frankie Mann and Stuart Holmes during the production of Trailed by Three (1920), shown reading the Motion Picture News

After being acquired by Martin Quigley in 1930, the publication was merged with Exhibitors' Herald World to form the Motion Picture Herald.

== See also ==
- List of film periodicals
