= Ruby Hoffman =

American actor

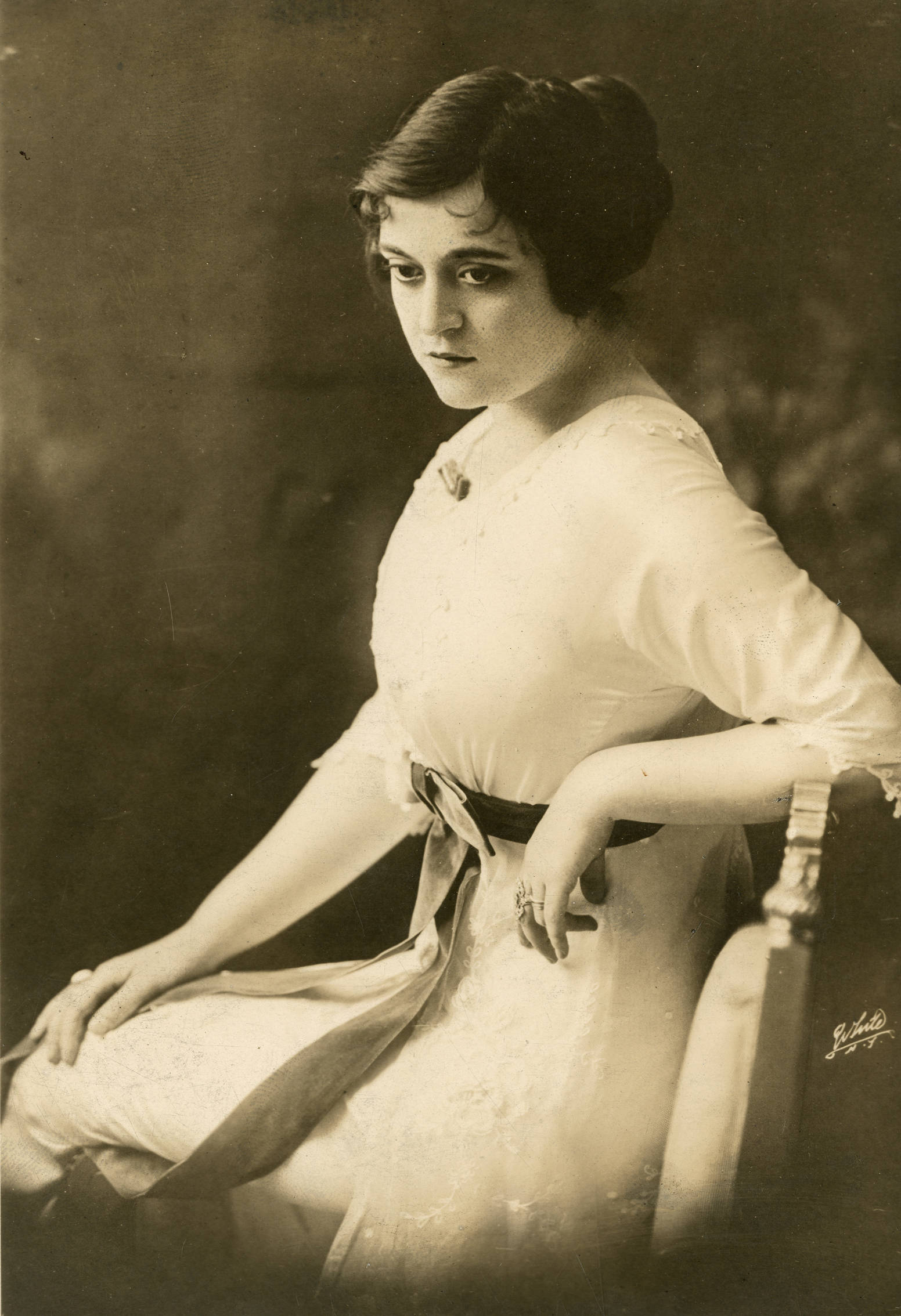
- Hoffman in 1913
- Born: July 28, 1886; Philadelphia, Pennsylvania, U.S.
- Died: September 22, 1973 (aged 87); Oxford, Ohio, U.S.
- Occupation: Actress
- Years active: 1914–1920
- Spouse: Gitz Rice (m. 1918; died 1947)

Ruby Hoffman (July 28, 1886 – September 22, 1973) was an American silent film and stage actress.

== Background ==
Ruby Hoffman was born on July 28, 1886, in Philadelphia, Pennsylvania, United States. She was an actress, known for The Lightning Raider (1919), The Dictator (1915) and The House of Hate (1918).

== Personal life ==
Hoffman married Gitz Rice in 1918, Rice later died in 1947. She died on September 22, 1973, in Oxford, Ohio at the age of 87. (Note: The New York Herald's February 6, 1920, issue has a story saying that the couple married "yesterday', which would be February 5, 1920 -- not 1918.)

== Filmography ==
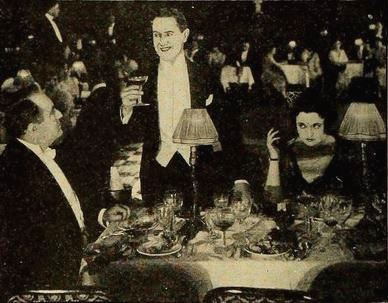
Roy Applegate, Taylor Holmes and Ruby Hoffman in Upside Down (1919)

- The Taint (1914)
- The Million (1914)
- Mistress Nell (1915)
- Children of the Ghetto (1915)
- The Dictator (1915)
- Poor Schmaltz (1915)
- The Fixer (1915)
- The Politicians (1915)
- Keep Moving (1915)
- The Danger Signal (1915)
- The Law of Blood (1916)
- Wild Oats (1916)
- The Perils of Divorce (1916)
- A Woman's Honor (1916)
- Her American Prince (1916)
- The Summer Girl (1916)
- The Slave Market (1917)
- Seven Deadly Sins - Passion (1917)
- The Dummy (1917)
- The Fatal Ring (1917)
- The House of Hate (1918)
- Uncle Tom's Cabin (1918)
- Upside Down (1919)
- The Lightning Raider (1919)
- Trailed by Three (1920)
- Cynthia of the Minute (1920)
- The Tiger's Cub (1920)
