= Astra Film Corp =

American film production company

- Industry: Silent films
- Founded: 1916; 109 years ago in Jersey City, New Jersey, United States
- Founder: Louis J. Gasnier; George B. Seitz
- Defunct: March 1920
- Fate: The company became Louis J. Gasnier Productions from 1920-1940, then Monogram Pictures acquired the studio in 1941.
- Successor: Louis J. Gasnier Productions (1920-1940)
- Headquarters: United States

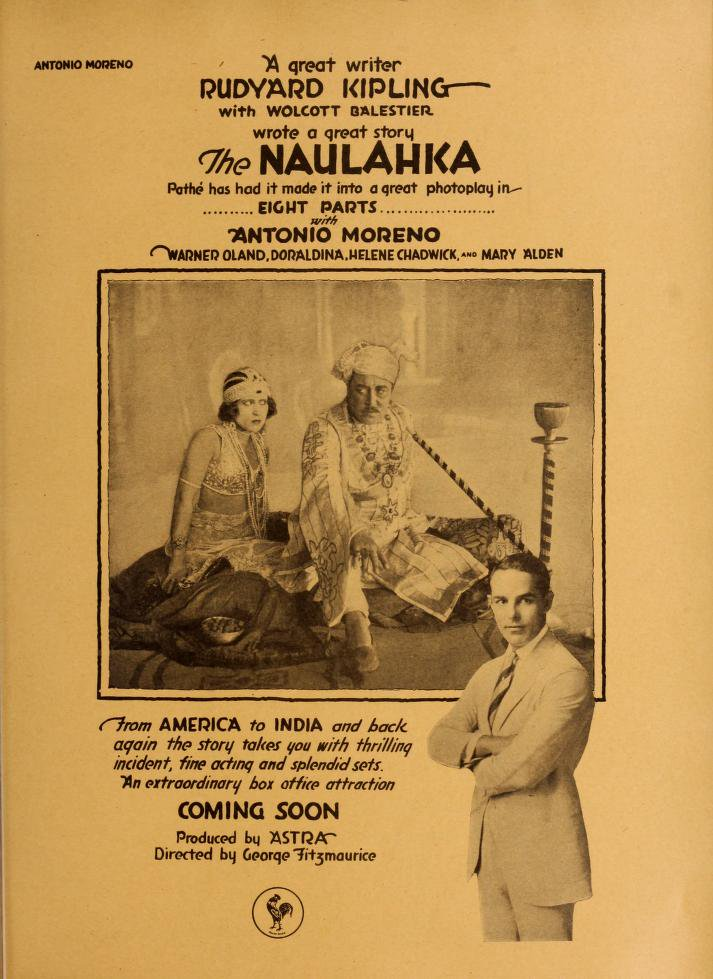
The Naulahka poster

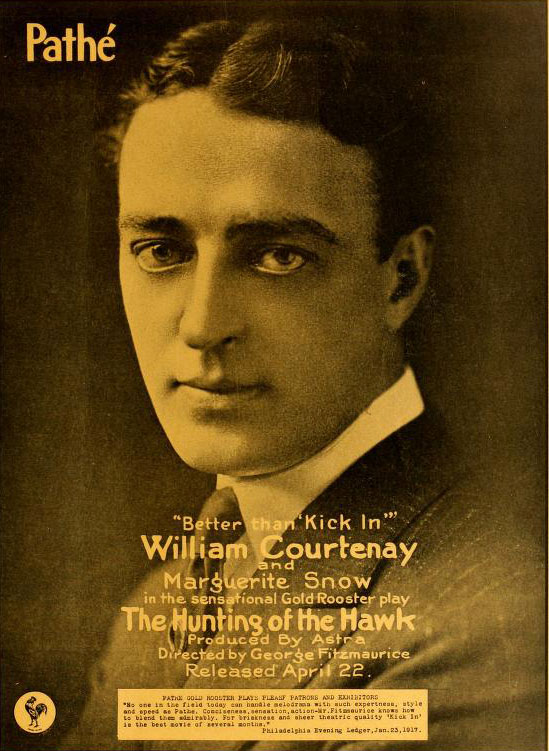
Ad for The Hunting of the Hawk

Astra Film Corp was an American film production company that produced silent films. Louis J. Gasnier was the company's president. George B. Seitz co-founded it. It was making films by 1916. It became Louis J. Gasnier Productions after Seitz left.

The studio operated in Jersey City, New Jersey before expanding to Fort Lee, New Jersey.

The Fort Lee studio site at 1 Congress Street was acquired from Pathé in 1916. The company distributed its films with Pathé. Rolin Studio in Los Angeles also worked with Pathé.

The company's Hands Up serial included a storyline featuring the Inca.

The studio produced Pathé's photoplay films including Stranded in Arcady. It was an adaptation of a story by Francis Lynde and starred Irene Castle. It was directed by Frank Hall Crane.

The company also produced The Fatal Ring and The Seven Pearls serials.

Arthur Miller worked for the company since at least 1916 working under director George Fitzmaurice and signing a contract with him personally. Grace Darmond left Selig to work for the company.

== Filmography ==
- At Bay (1915)
- Via Wireless (1915)
- Pearl of the Army (1916), a serial
- The Shielding Shadow (1916),
- The Romantic Journey (1916)
- The Black Orchid (1916), starring Grace Darmond
- Arms and the Woman (1916)
- Mayblossom (1917)
- The Seven Pearls (1917), a serial
- The Fatal Ring (1917), a 19-chapter serial
- The Hidden Hand (1917), a serial
- Kick In (1917)
- The Cigarette Girl (1917)
- Mystery of the Double Cross (1917)
- Caleb Piper's Girl (1917), starring Helene Chadwick
- The Hunting of the Hawk (1917)
- Vengeance Is Mine (1917)
- Stranded in Arcady (1917)
- Hands Up (1918), a serial
- The Yellow Ticket (1918)
- The House of Hate (1918)
- The Honest Thief (1918)
- The Naulahka (1918)
- The Hillcrest Mystery (1918)
- The House of Hate (1918), a serial
- A Japanese Nightingale (1918)
- The Adventures of Ruth (1919)
- The Cry of the Weak (1919)
- Out Better Selves (1919)
- The Tiger's Trail (1919), a serial
- The Lightning Raider (1919)
- The Pleasant Devil (1919)
- Daredevil Jack (1920)
- The Phantom Foe (1920)
- Pirate Gold (1920), a serial
- The Third Eye (1920), a serial
- Trailed by Three (1920)
