= Trailed by Three =

1920 film directed by Perry N. Vekroff

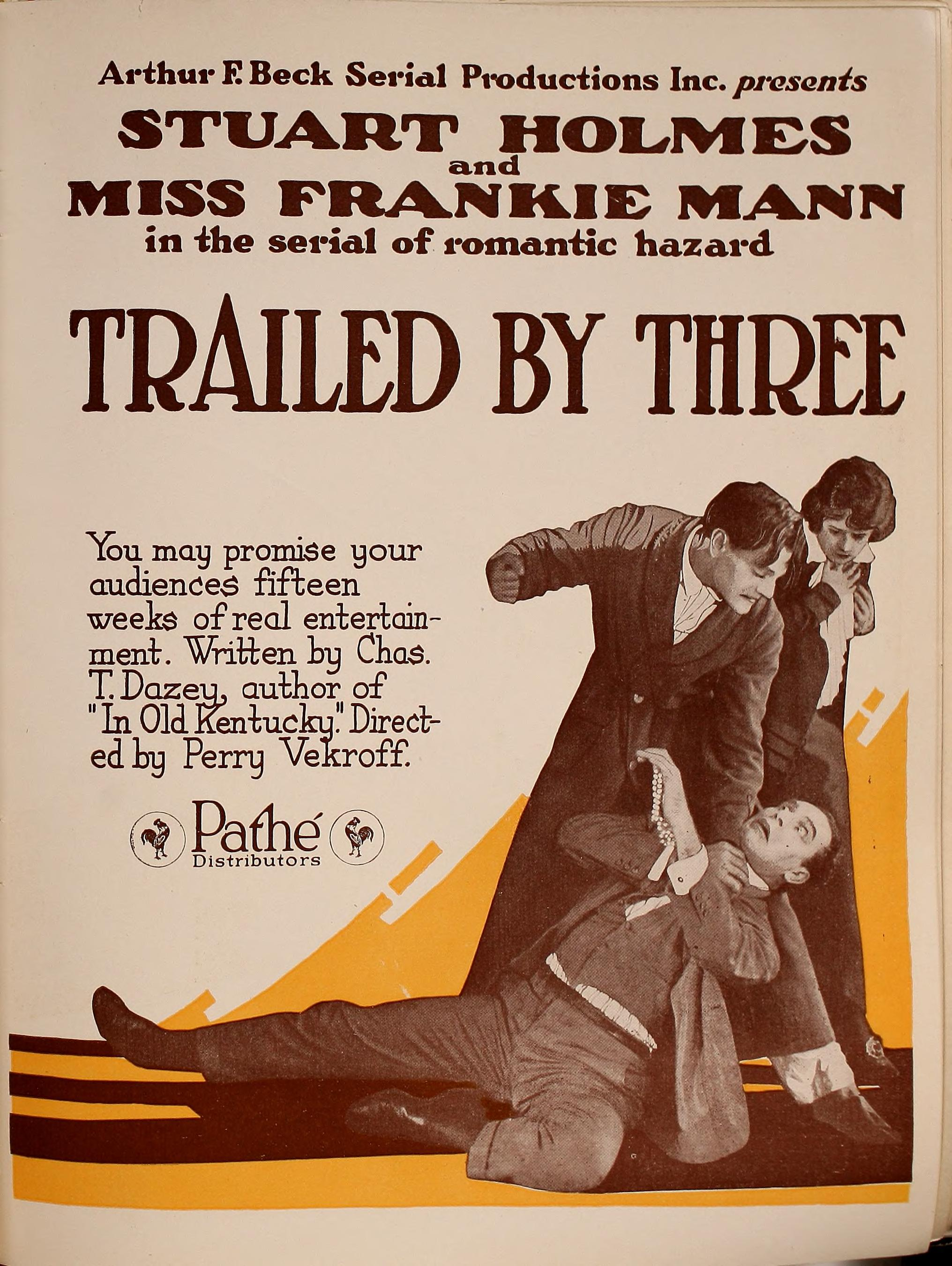
- Advert for the film
- Directed by: Perry N. Vekroff
- Written by: Charles T. Dazey
- Produced by: Arthur F. Beck
- Starring: Stuart Holmes; Frankie Mann
- Distributed by: Pathé Exchange; Astra Films
- Release date: April 4, 1920
- Running time: 15 episodes
- Country: United States
- Languages: Silent; English intertitles

Trailed by Three is a 1920 American silent Western film serial directed by Perry N. Vekroff. This is now considered to be a lost film.

== Cast ==
- Stuart Holmes as Michael Casserly
- Frankie Mann as Jane Creighton
- Wilfred Lytell as Tom Carewe
- John Webb Dillion as Roscoe Trent
- John P. Wade as James Carewe
- William Welsh as Aboto
- Ruby Hoffman

== See also ==
- List of film serials
- List of film serials by studio
- List of lost films
