= Aimée Dalmores =

American actress (1890–1920)

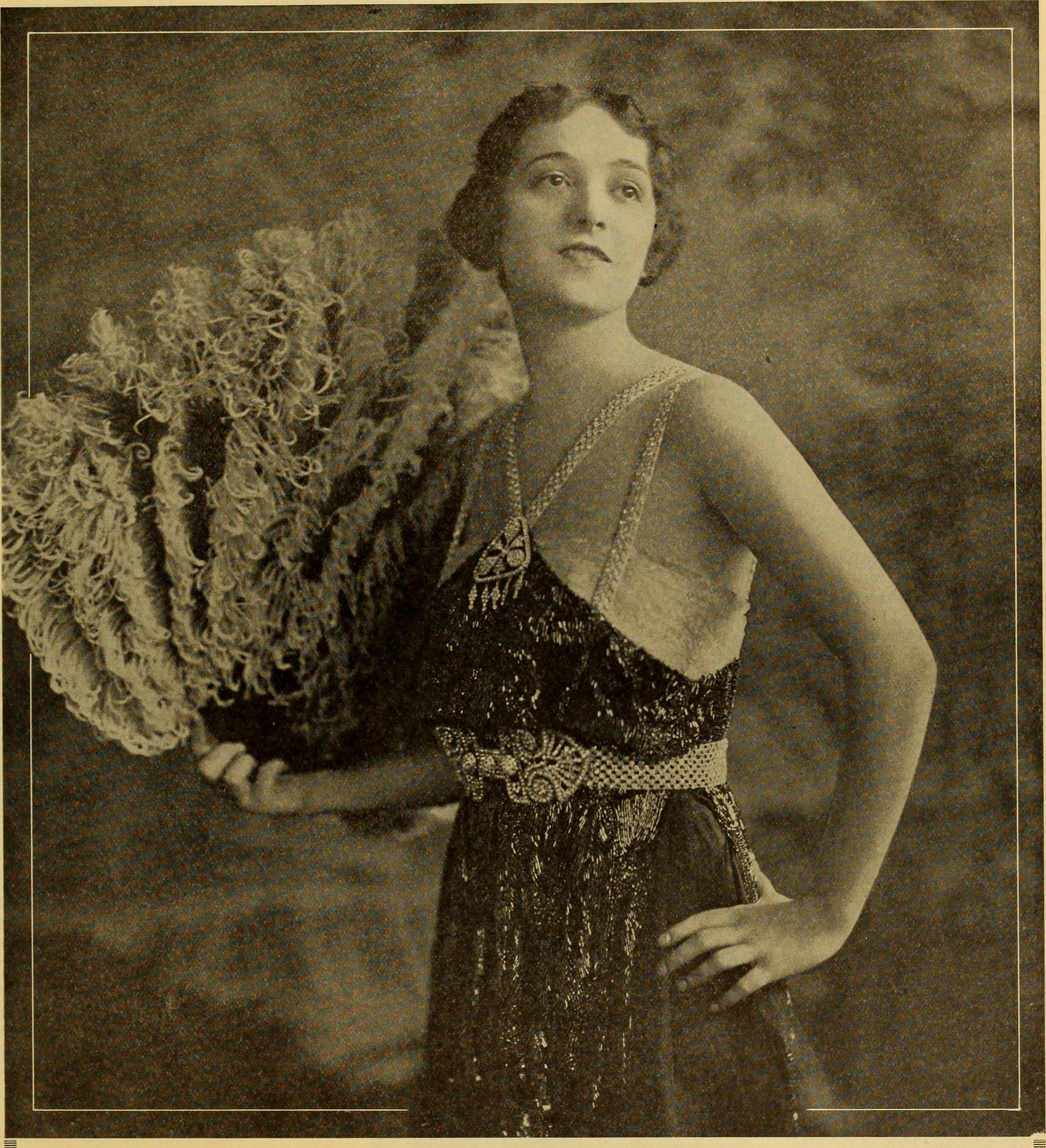
- Aimée Dalmores, from a 1917 directory.
- Born: February 11, 1890; Salerno, Province of Salerno, Campania, Italy
- Died: January 22, 1920 (aged 29); New York City
- Occupation: actress
- Years active: 1914–1920
- Known for: musical theatre, silent films

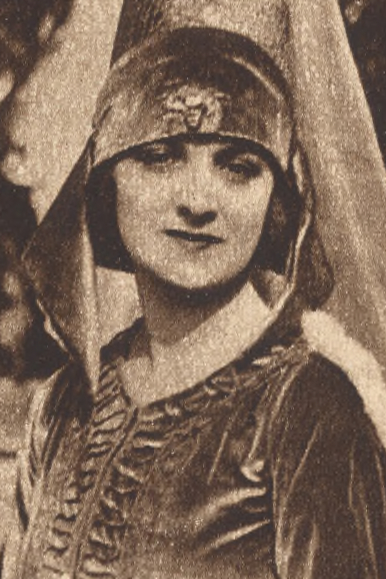
Aimée Dalmores, from a 1917 publication.

Aimée Dalmores (February 11, 1890 – January 22, 1920), née Aimée Cerruti, was an Italian-born American actress in musical theatre and silent films.

== Early life ==
Aimée Dalmores was born in Salerno, with the surname Cerruti, "of Neapolitan parentage." She immigrated to the United States with her family at the age of five. She returned to Europe to study art in Paris.

In 1920, Cerruti's parents lived at 309 East 144th Street in the Bronx. James J. Cerruti, also at that address, was a stenographer and typist with the New York Department of Public Charities in 1916 and 1917. James J. Cerruti was her brother; he had a career in the Army Signal Corps and later became an artist; he recalled his Italian immigrant parents and their home in the Bronx, and his sister "who ran away to be an actress".

== Career ==
Broadway appearances by Dalmores included roles in Dancing Around (1914–1915), Josephine (1918), and The Master (1918). Other stage credits included Taking Chances (1915), The Unchastened Woman (1916), Peace and Quiet (1916), Anna Cora Mowatt's short play Fashion (1917), and Fifth Avenue (1917). She was in the cast of The French Episode (1917), directed by Ben Ali Haggin, part of a pageant presented on Long Island, to benefit the American Red Cross during World War I. In 1918 she was the leading lady of the Robins Stock company in Toronto, where she starred in Broken Threads. Her film roles were in silent pictures from 1917, Scandal, starring Constance Talmadge, The On-the-Square Girl, written by Ouida Bergère, and Madame Fifi.

Dalmores considered beautiful costumes a "curse" in her profession, because they distracted audiences from her performance. "If I can only reach the point where the audience will say 'Doesn't she act well?" instead of 'Isn't her dress pretty?" I shall feel that I have accomplished something," she told a newspaper in 1918.

== Personal life ==
Dalmores died in New York City, from influenza, during the Spanish flu pandemic in 1920, and was survived by her parents. Her funeral was held at the Church of Our Lady of Mount Carmel in the Bronx.
