= Francis Lynde =

American author

Francis Lynde (November 12, 1856 – May 16, 1930) was an American writer. Three of his books were adapted to film. He was born in Lewiston, New York, and wrote adventure novels set in the American West in the early 20th century. The Chattanooga-Hamilton County Bicentennial Library has a collection of his papers.

His novels were set in the mountains of Colorado, Nevada, and Utah. Railroading and mining provided settings for his storylines. The main characters were often mining or railroad engineers. He penned a collection of detective stories about the eponymous government chemist Calvin "Scientific" Sprague. His story Moonshiner of Fact is set in the Appalachian Mountains of Eastern Tennessee.

Mary Antoinette Stickle Lynde (née Stickle; 1867–1960) was his wife.

He is buried in Forest Hills Cemetery, Chattanooga, Tennessee.

== Filmography ==
- Across the Burning Trestle (1914)
- Stranded in the Arcady (1917) pages 940, 941
- Bucking the Line (1921), based on his 1915 novel The Real Man

== Bibliography ==
- A Case in Equity (1895)
- A Romance in Transit (1897)
- The Helpers (1899)
- A Private Chivalry (1900)
- The Quickening (1906)
- The Taming of Red Butte (1910)
- The Real Man (1915)
- Branded (1917)
- The City of Numbered Days
- Empire Builders (1907)
- A Fool for Love
- The Grafters
- The Honorable Senator Sage-Brush
- The King of Arcadia
- The Master of Appleby: A Novel Tale Concerning Itself in Part with the Great Struggle in the Two Carolinas; but Chiefly with the Adventures Therein of Two Gentlemen Who Loved One and the Same Lady (English)
- Pirates' Hope
- The Price
- The Lawyer’s Livelihood (1909)
- Scientific Sprague (1912)
- The Real Man (1915)
- After the Manner of Men (1916)
- Stranded in the Arcady
- The Wreckers
- David Vallory (1919)
- A girl A Horse and a Dog (1920)
- The Fire Bringers (1921)
- Mr Arnold (1923)
- Mellowing Money, (1925)
- Fight on the Standing Stone, (1925)
- Cripple Creek Nineteen Hundred
- The Cruise of the Cuttlefish (1925)
- The Tenderfoots (1926)
- Blind man’s Bluff (1928)
- The Complete Railroad Crime Cases of Scientific Sprague (2023)

== Additional sources ==
- American Fiction, 1901–1925: A Bibliography By Geoffrey D. Smith, partial bibliography, Page 419
- Elizabeth Fry Page: Feathers from an Eagles Nest” The Olympian, V2 (V1 and V2 combined), 1903 Page 23–27, Google Books.
- Personal notes on Francis Lynde and his home on Lookout Mountain, Tennessee.
