= Smilin' Through =

Smilin' Through may refer to:

- "Smilin' Through" (song), a popular 1919 ballad
- Smilin' Through (play), a 1919 Broadway play, partially rewritten to go with the song's lyrics
- Smilin' Through (1922 film), an adaptation of the play, starring Norma Talmadge
- Smilin' Through (1932 film), another play adaptation, featuring Norma Shearer and Fredric March
- Smilin' Through (1941 film), another adaptation, with Jeanette MacDonald and Brian Aherne
- Smilin' Through, a 1982 album by Cleo Laine and Dudley Moore
