= Common Clay =

Common Clay may refer to:

- Common Clay (play), a 1915 American play by Cleves Kinkead
- Common Clay (1919 film), a silent film adaptation
- Common Clay (1930 film), a sound film adaptation starring Constance Bennett

== See also ==
- Private Number, a 1936 adaptation of the play
