= Matrimony (disambiguation) =

Matrimony is a socially or ritually recognised union between spouses.

Matrimony may also refer to:

- Matrimony (solitaire), a solitaire card game
- Matrimony (card game), a multi-player card game
- The Matrimony, a 2007 Chinese horror film starring Fan Bingbing
- "The Matrimony" (song), a 2015 song by Wale with Usher
- Matrimony Creek, a stream in North Carolina and Virginia
- Matrimony (film), a 1915 silent film drama

== See also ==
- Baháʼí marriage
- Buddhist view of marriage
- Catholic matrimony
- Christian views on marriage
- Marriage in Hinduism
- Marriage in Islam
- Jewish views on marriage
