= Thelma Salter =

American child actress (1908–1953)

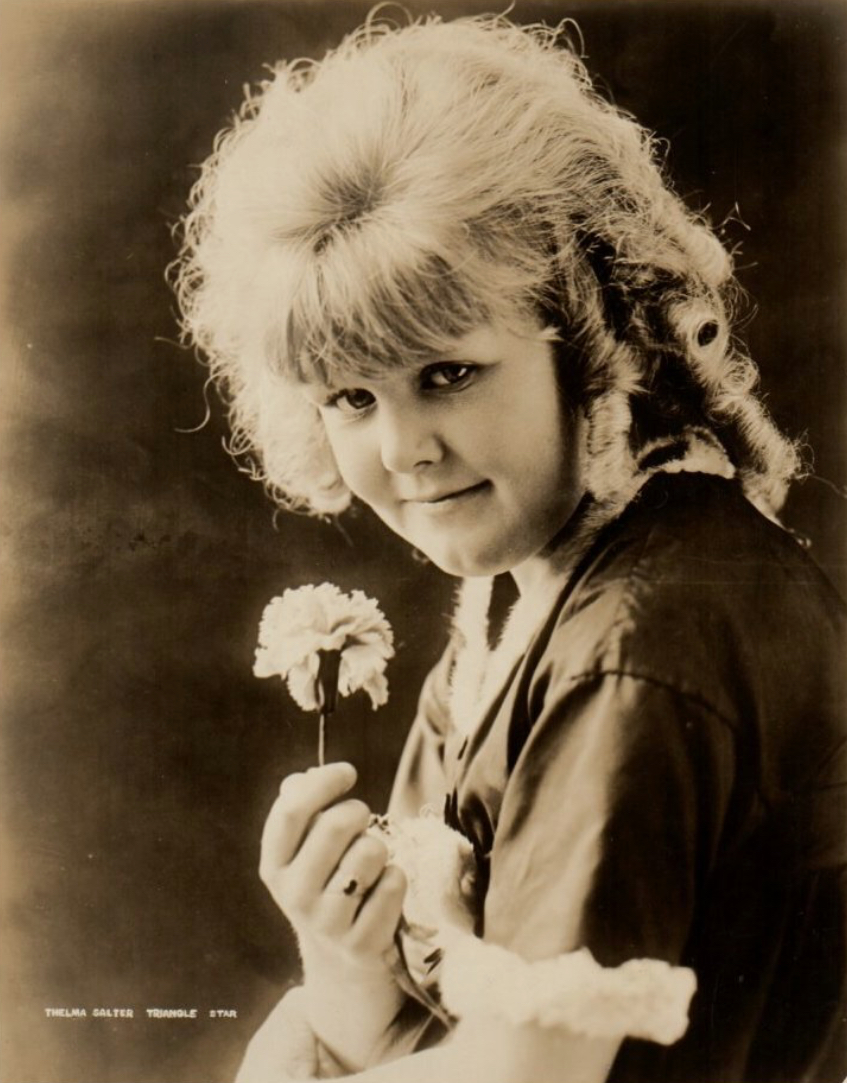
- Salter in 1917
- Born: January 15, 1908; Los Angeles, California, U.S.
- Died: November 17, 1953 (aged 45); Hollywood, California, U.S.
- Resting place: Forest Lawn Memorial Park, Glendale, California
- Occupation: Actress
- Years active: 1915–1929
- Spouse: Edward Kaufman

Thelma Salter (January 15, 1908 – November 17, 1953) was an American child actress during the silent film era. She starred in several Triangle Film Corporation productions during the 1910s, including leading roles in the films The Crab (1917) and In Slumberland (1917–1918). During her brief but widely publicized career, Salter was frequently praised in national promotional campaigns as one of the most appealing child performers in motion pictures.

== Early life and career ==
Salter was born in Los Angeles, California. She began acting in motion pictures at a very young age and was cast in several early Triangle-Kay Bee productions under the supervision of producer Thomas H. Ince. By 1917, she had gained recognition in Triangle features and was frequently promoted as a screen personality in her own right.

== Film career ==
In the five-reel drama The Crab, Salter portrayed Ivy Marten, a cheerful orphan girl who is adopted by a reclusive millionaire. Her character’s kindness gradually transforms the man’s cold demeanor and redeems him emotionally. Contemporary film promotions described Salter’s performance as central to the film’s appeal.

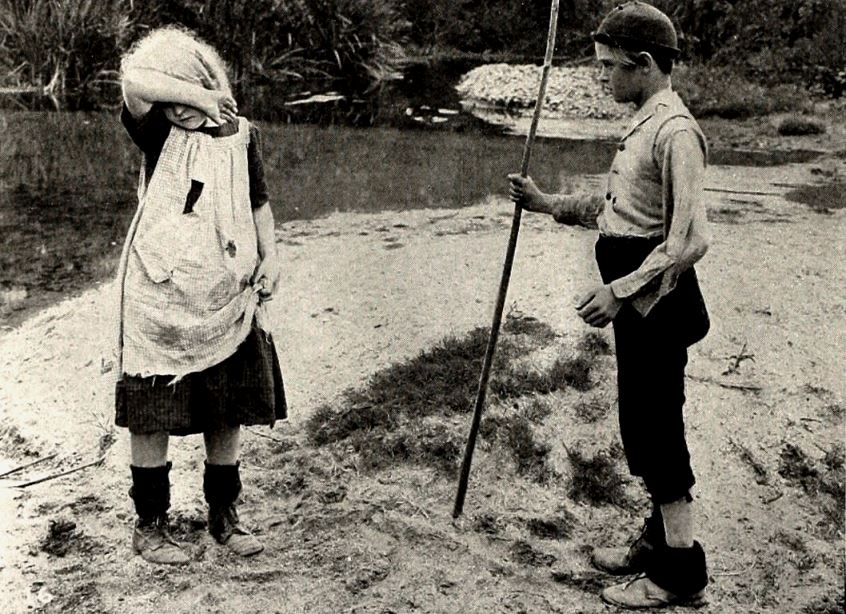
Thelma Salter in In Slumberland (1917)

Later in 1917, Salter starred in In Slumberland, a fantasy film directed by Irvin Willat and written by L. V. Jefferson. She co-starred with Georgie Stone in a story set in a dreamlike magical world. The production featured elaborate visual effects and double exposures, and was promoted as a children’s fantasy with fairy tale elements.

During her brief period of fame, Salter was widely promoted as a featured child performer. Promotional materials and press coverage referred to her as “the cutest child actress in motion pictures today,” “the beautiful and talented child star,” and “the world’s greatest child actress.”

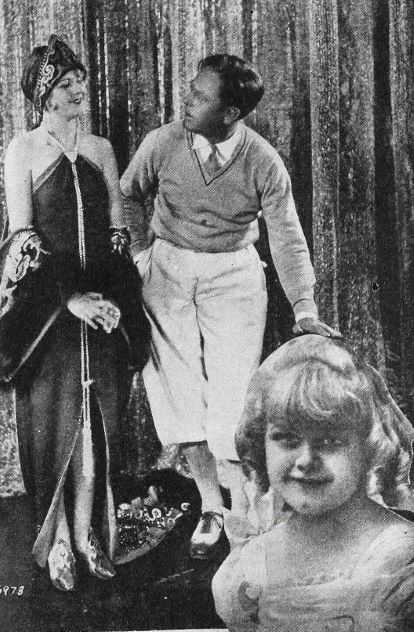
Salter as an uncredited extra in the film Bright Lights (1925)

Salter also appeared in a supporting role in Happiness (1917), a Triangle drama starring Enid Bennett. She had previously been featured in multiple uncredited Triangle-Kay Bee shorts during the mid-1910s.

Salter would later appear as Becky Thatcher in the 1920 film adaptation of Huckleberry Finn. She also played an uncredited extra in the 1925 romantic comedy film Bright Lights.

== Later life and death ==
Salter retired from acting after 1929. She later married writer-producer Edward Kaufman. She died on November 17, 1953, in Hollywood, California, at the age of 45. She is buried at Forest Lawn Memorial Park in Glendale.

== Filmography ==
Year	Title	Role	Notes
1913	Past Redemption	Little Tom	Silent drama short
1913	The Seal of Silence	—	Silent short
1914	Little Billy's Triumph	—	Silent short
1914	Jim Cameron's Wife	Jim Cameron's Child	Silent short
1915	The Disciple	Alice Houston	Triangle-Kay Bee short
1915	Bad Buck of Santa Ynez	The Daughter	Triangle-Kay Bee short
1915	The Alien	Dorothy Griswold	Triangle-Kay Bee short
1915	Matrimony	Viola	Feature; directed by Scott Sidney, produced by Thomas H. Ince
1916	The Wasted Years	—	Triangle short
1917	Selfish Yates	Betty Adams	Triangle short
1917	The Crab	Ivy Marten (aka Ivy Warren)	Lead role, Triangle feature; praised nationwide
1917	Happiness	Dolly Temple (child)	Supporting role, Triangle feature
1917–1918	In Slumberland	Eileen McCree / Thelma	Lead role, fantasy feature
1920	Huckleberry Finn	Becky Thatcher	Feature adaptation
1925	Bright Lights	—	Uncredited extra
1928	The Campus Vamp	Bathing Girl	Uncredited extra in short
1928	Sword Points	—	Minor role
1928	Run, Girl, Run	Minor role	Minor role
1928	Motorboat Mamas	Cafe Patron	Uncredited extra
