= Smilin' Through (1922 film) =

1922 film by Sidney Franklin

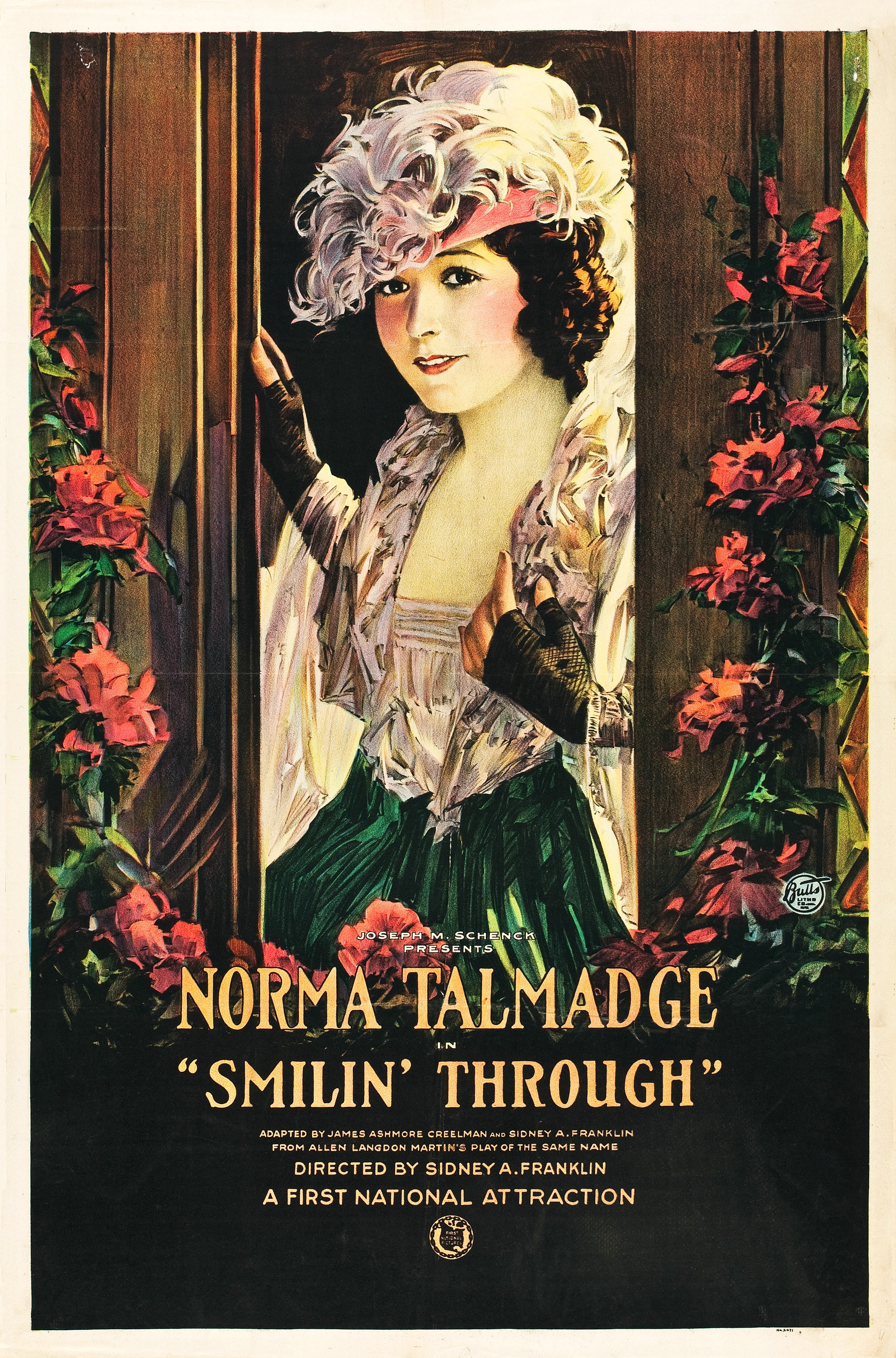
- Theatrical release poster
- Directed by: Sidney Franklin
- Written by: James Ashmore Creelman (scenario); Sidney Franklin (scenario)
- Based on: Smilin' Through; 1919 play by Alan Langdon Martin (aka Jane Murfin and Jane Cowl)
- Produced by: Norma Talmadge; Joseph M. Schenck
- Starring: Norma Talmadge; Harrison Ford; Wyndham Standing
- Cinematography: J. Roy Hunt; Charles Rosher
- Distributed by: First National Pictures
- Release date: February 13, 1922
- Running time: 96 minutes
- Country: United States
- Language: Silent (English intertitles)
- Box office: $1 million (US/Canada)

Smilin' Through (1922; Dutch intertitles)

Smilin' Through is a 1922 American silent drama film based on the 1919 play of the same name, written by Jane Cowl and Jane Murfin (together under the pseudonym Alan Langdon Martin). The film starred Norma Talmadge, Harrison Ford, and Wyndham Standing. It was co-written and directed by Sidney Franklin, who also directed the more famous 1932 remake at MGM. The film was produced by Talmadge and her husband Joseph M. Schenck for her company, the Norma Talmadge Film Corporation. It was released by First National Pictures. Popular character actor Gene Lockhart made his screen debut in this film.

The story is essentially the same as the popular Jane Cowl play, with Talmadge in the dual role of Kathleen and Moonyean. Kathleen, a young Irish woman, is in love with Kenneth Wayne but is prevented from marrying him by her guardian, John Carteret. John is haunted by memories of his thwarted love for Kathleen's aunt, Moonyean.

The story was an especially popular one and was filmed twice more by MGM: in 1932 with Norma Shearer and in 1941 with Jeanette MacDonald.

== Plot ==
As described in a film magazine, on a moonlit night many years prior to the story, John Carteret and the beautiful Moonyeen were to be married. The guests were assembled, and the garden in which the wedding would take place presented a scene of gaiety, beautifully decorated and lit with many lanterns.

Just prior to the ceremony, Jeremiah Wayne, desperately in love with Moonyeen, forces his way through the crowd and tries to stop the wedding. As John moved towards him, Jeremiah drew a pistol and leveled it at the bridegroom. Just as the shot was fired, Moonyeen moved to protect John and received the bullet intended for him. As she lay dying, the marriage ceremony was performed.

Many years later, Kathleen, the image of her aunt Moonyeen, has become the ward of John. She meets Kenneth Wayne, the son of Jeremiah, and the couple fall in love, much to the grief of her guardian, who hates the name of the man who caused him a lifetime of sorrow. John orders the young Wayne away and forbids Kathleen from ever seeing him again. In spite of John's orders, Kathleen goes to bid farewell to her sweetheart as he leaves for duty in World War I.

When she returns, John tells her the story of Moonyeen as the reason she must forget Kenneth. After four years, Kathleen and Kenneth meet, the latter returning wounded and crippled. Kenneth feels that in his condition, he is not fit to wed Kathleen and leaves her, letting she thinking that he is in love with someone else. That night, the spirit of Moonyeen appears to John and, as a result of the visitation, the old man sends for Kenneth.

The lovers are reunited just prior to the death of John, who dies happily knowing that he has not doomed the couple to the life of sorrow that he had.

== Cast ==
- Norma Talmadge as Kathleen / Moonyeen
- Harrison Ford as Kenneth Wayne / Jeremiah Wayne
- Wyndham Standing as John Carteret
- Alec B. Francis as Dr. Owen
- Glenn Hunter as Willie Ainsley
- Grace Griswold as Ellen
- Miriam Battista as Lil Mary, Moonyeen's sister
- Gene Lockhart as Village Rector (credited as Eugene Lockhart)
- Buddy Roosevelt as Departing / Returning Soldier with Mother (uncredited)

== Reception ==
Mary Pickford praised Talmadge's performance and the film's sets, costumes, and entertaining story. "It deals with a subject which interests most women — that of spiritualism — which is so delicately and beautifully handled that it could offend no one," she described. It was one of her favorite films.

== Home media ==
Smilin' Through was released on Region 0 DVD-R by Alpha Video on July 7, 2015.

== See also ==
- Smilin' Through (1932 film)
- Smilin' Through (1941 film)
- Smilin' Through (play) 1919
- Smilin' Through (song)
