= Orme Caldara =

American stage actor

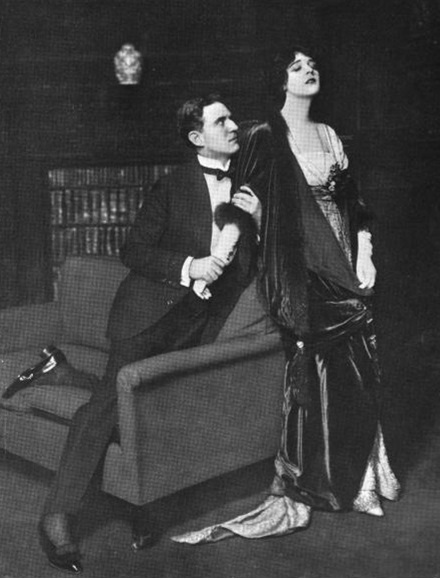
- Orme Caldara and Jane Cowl in Within the Law
- Born: Frank Slocum; February 9, 1875; Empire City, Oregon, U.S.
- Died: October 21, 1925 (aged 50); Saranac Lake, New York, U.S.
- Resting place: Pine Ridge Cemetery, Saranac Lake, Essex County, New York
- Occupation: Actor
- Years active: 1904–1919
- Spouse: Julia Dean (m. 1906; div. 1913)

Orme Caldara (born Frank Slocum; February 9, 1875 – October 21, 1925) was an American stage actor. He was married to actress Julia Dean from 1906 to 1913. Caldara appeared in one movie, The Spreading Dawn with Jane Cowl. He often appeared with Cowl in the theatre co-starring with her in several influential Broadway plays, including Within the Law (1912–1913), Common Clay (1915–1916), Lilac Time (1917), and Smilin' Through (1919–1920).

Caldara contracted tuberculosis in the early 1920s, and his ailing health forced him to retire from his stage career. He died of the disease in a sanatorium in Saranac Lake, New York, in 1925.

== Biography ==
Caldara was born Frank Slocum on February 9, 1875 in Empire City, Oregon. His father, Caleb Slocum, was a native of Peoria, Illinois. Caldara was working as a stage actor by 1898, when he was a leading member of the Lorraine Hollis Company. He began appearing on Broadway in 1904, and performed in numerous productions until 1920.

In addition to acting, Caldara was also a professional swimmer.

== Death ==
Caldara contracted tuberculosis in the early 1920s, and his ailing health forced him into an early retirement. He died of the disease in a tuberculosis sanatorium in Saranac Lake, New York, on October 21, 1925.

== Filmography ==
Year	Title	Role	Notes	Ref.
1917	The Spreading Dawn	Anthony Vanderpyl		

== Select stage credits ==
Year	Title	Role	Notes	Ref.
1904	The Sorceress		New Amsterdam Theatre	
1905	Friquet		Savoy Theatre	
1907	The Aero Club	Jack Chandler	Criterion Theatre	
1907	The Round Up	Jack Payson	New Amsterdam Theatre; Broadway Theatre	
1912–1913	Within the Law	Richard Gilder	Eltinge 42nd Street Theatre	
1915–1916	Common Clay	Hugh Fullerton	Theatre Republic	
1919–1920	Smilin' Through	Kenneth Wayne / Jeremiah Wayne	Broadhurst Theatre	

== Sources ==
- Bordman, Gerald Martin (1987). The Concise Oxford Companion to American Theatre. Oxford, England: Oxford University Press. ISBN 978-0-195-16986-7.
- Vazzana, Eugene Michael (2001). Silent Film Necrology. Jefferson, North Carolina: McFarland. ISBN 978-0-786-41059-0.
- Wearing, J. P. (1979). American and British Theatrical Biography. Metuchen, New Jersey: Scarecrow Press. ISBN 0-8108-1201-0.
