= Private Number (1936 film) =

1936 film by Roy Del Ruth

- Theatrical film poster
- Directed by: Roy Del Ruth
- Written by: Gene Markey; William Conselman
- Based on: Common Clay (play) by Cleves Kinkead
- Produced by: Darryl F. Zanuck; Raymond Griffith
- Starring: Robert Taylor; Loretta Young; Basil Rathbone; Patsy Kelly
- Cinematography: Peverell Marley
- Edited by: Allen McNeil
- Music by: Louis Silvers
- Production company: Twentieth Century Fox
- Distributed by: Twentieth Century Fox
- Release date: June 5, 1936
- Running time: 80 minutes
- Country: United States
- Language: English

Private Number is a 1936 American drama film, with the alternative title of Secret Interlude. It was directed by Roy Del Ruth, and stars Robert Taylor, Loretta Young and Basil Rathbone. The film was based on the 1915 play Common Clay (originally Hush Money) by Cleves Kinkead, which was already a silent film in 1919 and a sound film in 1930, both with the play's name. Following stricter enforcement of the Motion Picture Production Code from mid-1934, the more scandalous elements of the earlier films were left out of this version.

A young maid secretly weds her bosses' son and has his baby.

== Plot ==
Ellen Neal is a 17-year-old girl looking for work as a servant when she arrives at the New York home of the wealthy Winfield family. There she meets servant Gracie, who sets up an interview between her and the butler, Thomas Wroxton. Wroxton rules the household staff like a tyrant, demanding a large cut of their wages as his "commission". Despite Ellen having no experience, he finds her attractive, gives her a month's trial of work, and says she must report to him only. She begins to leave, uncomfortable, but Gracie convinces her to stay. Ellen then charms Mrs. Winfield so much that she becomes her personal maid.

The Winfields' son, Richard, returns home from college with his Great Dane dog, and meets Ellen at a party. He does not know she is a servant. Later, Gracie and her boyfriend Smiley take Ellen on a blind date. An argument turns into a riot. Ellen flees and meets Coakley, a man she had met just before, who gives her a ride to his home. The police raid the house for illegal gambling and arrest them. Wroxton bails her out of jail.

On a family trip to Maine, Ellen finds out that Richard is set to marry another woman. Despite this, Richard says she is his only romantic interest and doesn't mind her being a servant. He suggests they marry, but she thinks it would be a mistake. Later, Wroxton asks Ellen to marry him, admitting he watches every move she makes. She rejects him, and he catches on to her relationship with Richard. A maid tells Wroxton that she knows Ellen is pregnant and has secretly married Richard. Wroxton vengefully tells the Winfields about the pregnancy. Mr. Winfield wants to end her employment, but his wife says she likes her. They want more information from Ellen, but Gracie blurts out that Ellen and Richard are married. They all argue, and Wroxton informs them about Ellen's arrest. Frustrated, she confirms she is pregnant, and storms out without taking the money offered by the family. When Richard finds out she has left, he searches for her, while Wroxton and Mr. Winfield agree to block her future mail.

Ellen has her baby alone and lives on a farm now. Gracie and Smiley visit her, but two men deliver a letter saying Richard wants to annul their marriage for fraud. Smiley calls over his attorney Stapp, who says they must first verify they are married. Meanwhile, Richard has no clue his family sent the letter. Mr. Winfield shows Richard that Ellen is renting an apartment and spending much money in his name as Mrs. Winfield, furthering their suspicion that she is a gold digger. The scandal is sensationalized in the local newspaper. Richard finds Ellen and signs the annulment papers after realizing she had been arrested before. Stapp prepares Coakley as their witness. In court, Ellen testifies that she is not a gold digger and that she just loves Richard and wants to protect their baby. To Ellen and Stapp's shock, Coakley is called as a prosecution witness. He lies about what happened the night she was arrested, and it is insinuated that he slept with her when she was underage. Stapp calls for his arrest on the spot. Panicked, Coakley meets the prosecution team, and it is revealed that Wroxton paid him to switch sides and to lie for his testimony. Richard punches Wroxton and asks the court to throw out the case. He gives a speech about his love for Ellen and his belief in her innocence the entire time. The couple are finally reconciled.

In the earlier films, Ellen and her baby are both illegitimate; her mother had committed suicide to spare the disgrace of her father, who turns out to be her boyfriend's family's lawyer.

== Cast ==
- Robert Taylor as Richard Winfield
- Loretta Young as Ellen Neal
- Basil Rathbone as Thomas Wroxton
- Patsy Kelly as Gracie
- Joe E. Lewis as Smiley Watson (as Joe Lewis)
- Marjorie Gateson as Mrs. Winfield
- Paul Harvey as Perry Winfield
- Jane Darwell as Mrs. Meecham (credits) or Mrs. Frisby (spoken)
- Paul Stanton as Rawlings
- John Miljan as Sam Stapp
- Monroe Owsley as James Coakley
- Billy Bevan as Frederick
- Frank Dawson as Graham
- George Irving as Judge
- May Beatty as Grandma Gammon
- Alexander Pollard as Footman (as Alex Pollard)
- Jack Pennick as Gus Rilovitch
- John Van Eyck as John
- Kane Richmond as Joe
- Lilyan Irene as Hazel
- Maxine Elliott Hicks as Olga (as Maxine Hicks)
- Betty Morris as Teena
- Lillian Worth as Maud
- Anne Howard as Violet (as Ann Howard)
- Prince as Hamlet (dog)

== Reception ==
A trade digest gives several summaries of the film. Motion Picture Reviews said the film "is entertaining only because it is a vehicle for the ascendant Robert Taylor and lovely Loretta Young, but it chalks up nothing on their scores because it is intrinsically trashy. Motives are confused, situations forced, direction not remarkable". However, The Hollywood Reporter deemed it "a love story that hits romantic high for the year, bringing together as a modern Cinderella and her prince, Loretta Young and Robert Taylor ... The combination spells box office returns in the smash category. Its appeal is especially to women, who will give it unlimited word-of-mouth boosting, but it is candy entertainment for any man with a spark of romance in his make-up". The Motion Picture Daily simply said: "This is typical Hollywood fare ..."; Variety (of Hollywood) called it "solid entertainment for the masses".

Other reviews are also mixed. The New York Times failed to see a meaning in the title. It called Wroxton a hateful, stalking basilisk, but concluded: "Believe it or not, the picture is well acted throughout." Turner Classic Movies called Loretta Young "gorgeously lit", and mourned the pre-Code Hollywood era from three years earlier. Another review says: "A dated film that's a heavy slog for the modern-day viewer."

== Bibliography ==
- Bernstein, Matthew. Controlling Hollywood: Censorship and Regulation in the Studio Era. Athlone Press, 2000.
