= Smilin' Through (song) =

Song

Single by Reinald Werrenrath
- B-side: "Think Love of Me"
- Published: 1919
- Released: September 1919
- Recorded: April 15, 1919
- Genre: Traditional pop
- Label: Victor
- Songwriter: Arthur A. Penn

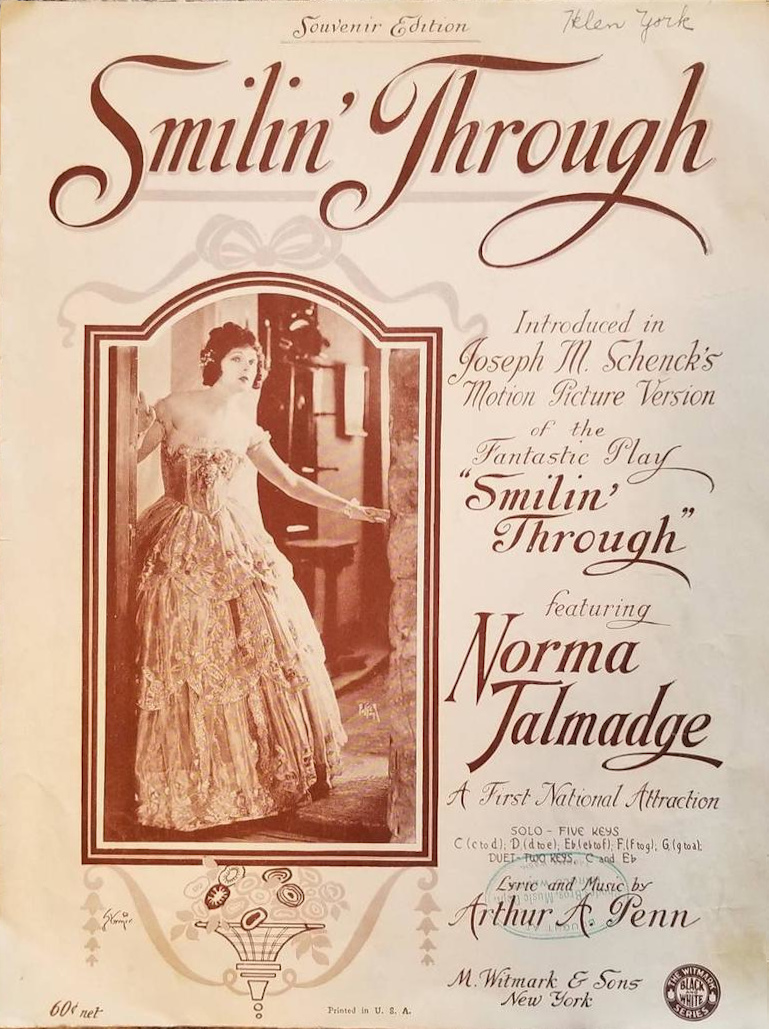
1922 edition with photo of Norma Talmadge

"Smilin' Through" is a popular ballad with lyrics and music by Arthur A. Penn.

== History ==
The song "Smilin' Through" was first published in 1919 by M. Witmark and Sons and Reinald Werrenrath had a very successful recording of it that year.

It was recorded by many singers, including John McCormack, Eleanor Steber, Nelson Eddy, and Judy Garland, and remained a popular standard for decades. Bing Crosby recorded the song in 1956 for use on his radio show and it was subsequently included in the CD On the Sentimental Side (2010).

Penn's song was also closely associated with the 1919 play Smilin' Through by Jane Cowl. The creation of the song and that of the play were independent but intertwined. According to Isidore Witmark in his history of the Witmark and Sons publishing house, Cowl's play was partially rewritten after the song was published, based upon the imagery of the lyrics. Both the title and music of the song were incorporated into the play when it was completed and produced on Broadway in December, 1919.

The melody was also used to accompany the 1922 silent film. The soundtracks for both the 1932 and 1941 MGM films of Smilin' Through feature the song as well. It forms the title music for both films and Jeanette MacDonald sings it in the latter film. Norma Shearer's character sings the song in the 1932 film, dubbed by singer Georgia Stark.

Jazz saxophonist Wayne Shorter plays his own interpretation of the ballad on the album "Beyond the Sound Barrier" (2005). The 12 minute track bears little resemblance to the original; it is more reflective of Shorter's feelings about the song, one of his favorites.

The song was often featured on the BBC TV variety program The Good Old Days, performed by Barry Kent and Robert White, among others
