= Common Clay (1919 film) =

1919 film by George Fitzmaurice

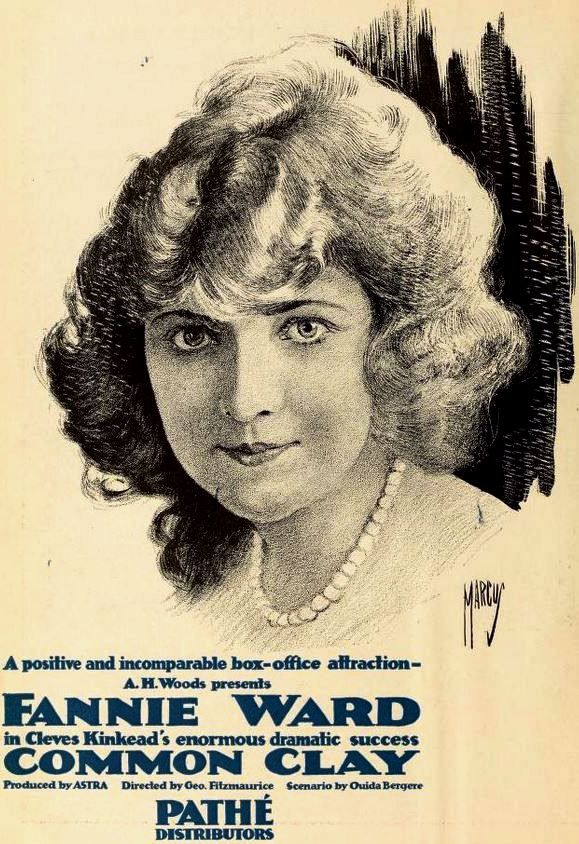
- Ad for the film from a 1919 issue of Moving Picture World
- Directed by: George Fitzmaurice
- Written by: Ouida Bergère
- Based on: Common Clay (play) by Cleves Kinkead
- Produced by: A.H. Woods
- Starring: Fannie Ward
- Cinematography: Charles Miller
- Production company: Astra Films
- Distributed by: Pathé Exchange
- Release date: March 2, 1919
- Running time: 7 reels
- Country: USA
- Language: Silent...English intertitles

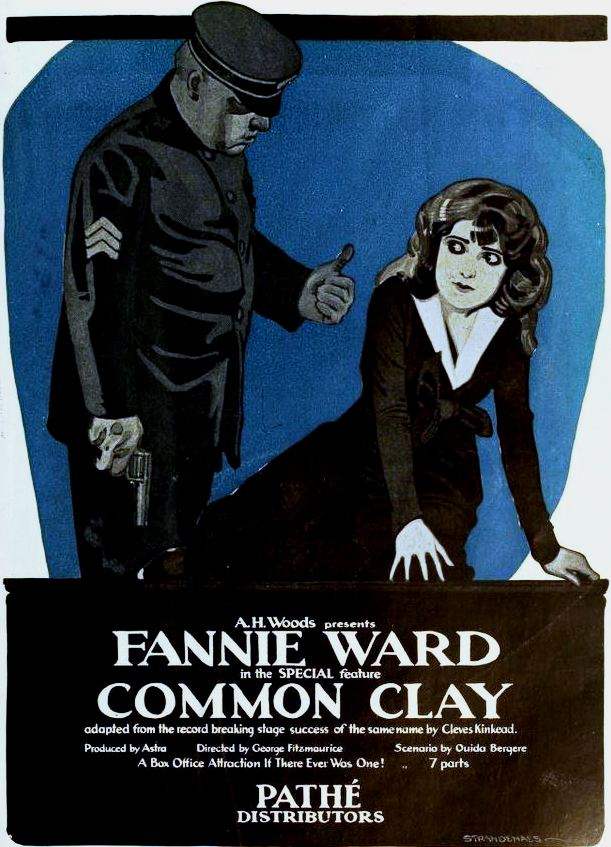
Ad for the film from a 1919 issue of Moving Picture World

Common Clay is a 1919 American silent drama film directed by George Fitzmaurice and starring Fannie Ward. It was based on a 1915 play by Cleves Kinkead which starred Jane Cowl. Produced by Astra Film, it was distributed through Pathé Exchange. In 1930 it was remade in early sound under the same title and starring Constance Bennett.

== Cast ==
- Fannie Ward - Ellen Neal
- Easter Walters - Jennie Peters
- Fred Goodwins - Arthur Coakley
- John Cossar - Mr. Fullerton
- Helen Dunbar - Mrs. Fullerton
- W. E. Lawrence - Hugh Fullerton
- John Barrows - Judge Filson
- Mary Alden - Mrs. Neal
- Andrew Arbuckle - Mr. Neal
- Henry A. Barrows

== Preservation ==
With no prints of Common Clay located in any film archives, it is considered a lost film. In February 2021, the film was cited by the National Film Preservation Board on their Lost U.S. Silent Feature Films list.
