= The Crab (1917 film) =

- Directed by: Walter Edwards
- Written by: C. Gardner Sullivan
- Produced by: New York Motion Picture Company; Thomas H. Ince
- Starring: Thelma Salter; Frank Keenan
- Cinematography: Robert S. Newhard
- Distributed by: Triangle Film Corporation
- Release date: February 4, 1917
- Running time: 5 reels
- Country: United States
- Language: Silent (English intertitles)

The Crab is a 1917 American silent drama film directed by Walter Edwards and starring child actress Thelma Salter and actor Frank Keenan. Its production was supervised by Thomas H. Ince with distribution by Triangle Film Corporation.

== Cast ==
- Thelma Salter as Ivy Marten
- Frank Keenan as Foster Borrum
- Ernest Butterworth as 'Warts' Warner
- Gertrude Claire as Mrs. Borrum
- J. P. Lockney as Jim Owens
- Tom Guise as 'Doc' Wingate (credited as Thomas Guise)
- Aggie Herring as Townswoman (uncredited)

== Preservation status ==
Prints of The Crab are preserved in the George Eastman Museum Motion Picture Collection and the French archive Centre national du cinéma et de l'image animée in Fort de Bois-d'Arcy.
