= The Ransom (1915 film) =

- Directed by: Edmund Lawrence
- Written by: Eve Unsell
- Based on: The Marionettes play by Oliver W. Geoffreys (aka Eve Unsell)
- Produced by: Triumph Film Company
- Starring: Julia Dean
- Distributed by: World Film Company
- Release date: December 28, 1915
- Running time: 5 reels
- Country: USA
- Language: Silent...English intertitles

The Ransom is a lost 1915 silent drama film starring directed by Lawrence Edmund and starring Julia Dean. It was released by World Film Company.

== Cast ==
- Julia Dean - Janet Osborne
- Louise Huff - Marcia Osborne
- J. Albert Hall - Mark Osborne (*as James Hall)
- Ethel Lloyd - Sarah Osborne
- Willard Case - Ellis Raymond
- Kenneth Hunter - Geoffrey Allen
- William McKey - (*as William Mackey)
- Lorna Volare -
- Adelaide Lawrence -
- Evelyn Dumo -
