= The Spreading Dawn =

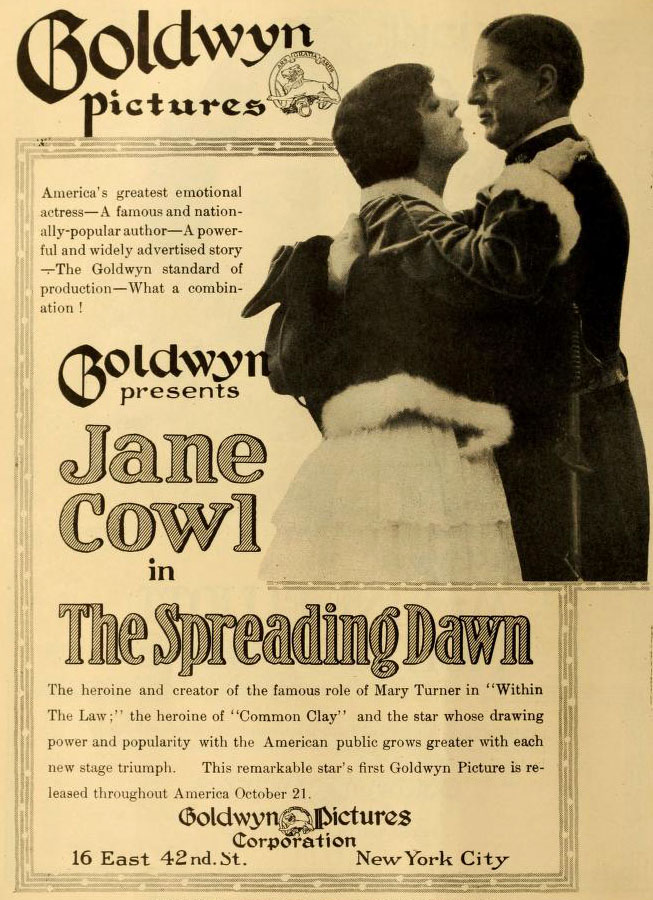
- Directed by: Laurence Trimble
- Based on: The Spreading Dawn by Basil King
- Produced by: Samuel Goldwyn
- Starring: Jane Cowl
- Cinematography: Phil Rosen
- Distributed by: Goldwyn Pictures
- Release date: October 21, 1917
- Running time: 5 reels
- Country: United States
- Language: Silent (English intertitles)

The Spreading Dawn is a 1917 American silent drama film produced by Samuel Goldwyn in his first year of producing independently in his own studio and starring Broadway stage star Jane Cowl in her second and final silent film. It was directed by Laurence Trimble. The film is lost with a fragment, apparently only part of reel 3, surviving at the Library of Congress.

This film was based on a short fiction The Spreading Dawn by Basil King that first appeared in the Saturday Evening Post. It was later the title of a collection of short stories in 1927.

== Plot ==
As described in a film magazine, Georgina Vanderpyl loves Captain Lewis Nugent, but her aunt Patricia will not allow her to marry, and as proof of her reasons she gives Georgina her journal to read. The story as told in the journal is how happy Patricia is when she meets Anthony Vanderpyl. They are married, but shortly thereafter Anthony is called away to war. He comes home on a furlough and after a brief visit leaves. Patricia does not understand this sudden departure, and then Mr. LeRoy tells her that Anthony is with his wife Cornelia. When Anthony returns, LeRoy shoots Anthony and Patricia believes the worst of him. Dying, Anthony writes a letter to his wife, but Patricia has never opened it. Georgina coaxes her to read it, and when Patricia does, she discovers her late husband's innocence. Asking his forgiveness, she goes to meet him in the spreading dawn.

== Cast ==
- Jane Cowl as Patricia Mercer Vanderpyl
- Orme Caldara as Anthony Vanderpyl
- Harry Spingler as Bentley Vanderpyl (credited as Harry Springer)
- Florence Billings as Mrs. Cornelia Le Roy
- Henry Stephenson as Mr. LeRoy (credited as Harry Stephenson)
- Alice Chapin as Mrs. Mercer
- Helen Blair as Young Lizzie
- Cecil Owen as Colonel Lee
- Mabel Ballin as Georgina Vanderpyl
- Edmund Lowe as Captain Lewis Nugent
- Edith McAlpin as Old Lizzie
- Antoinette Erwin (uncredited)
- Lettie Ford (uncredited)
- Charles Hammond (uncredited)
- Marion Knapp (uncredited)
