= The Garden of Lies =

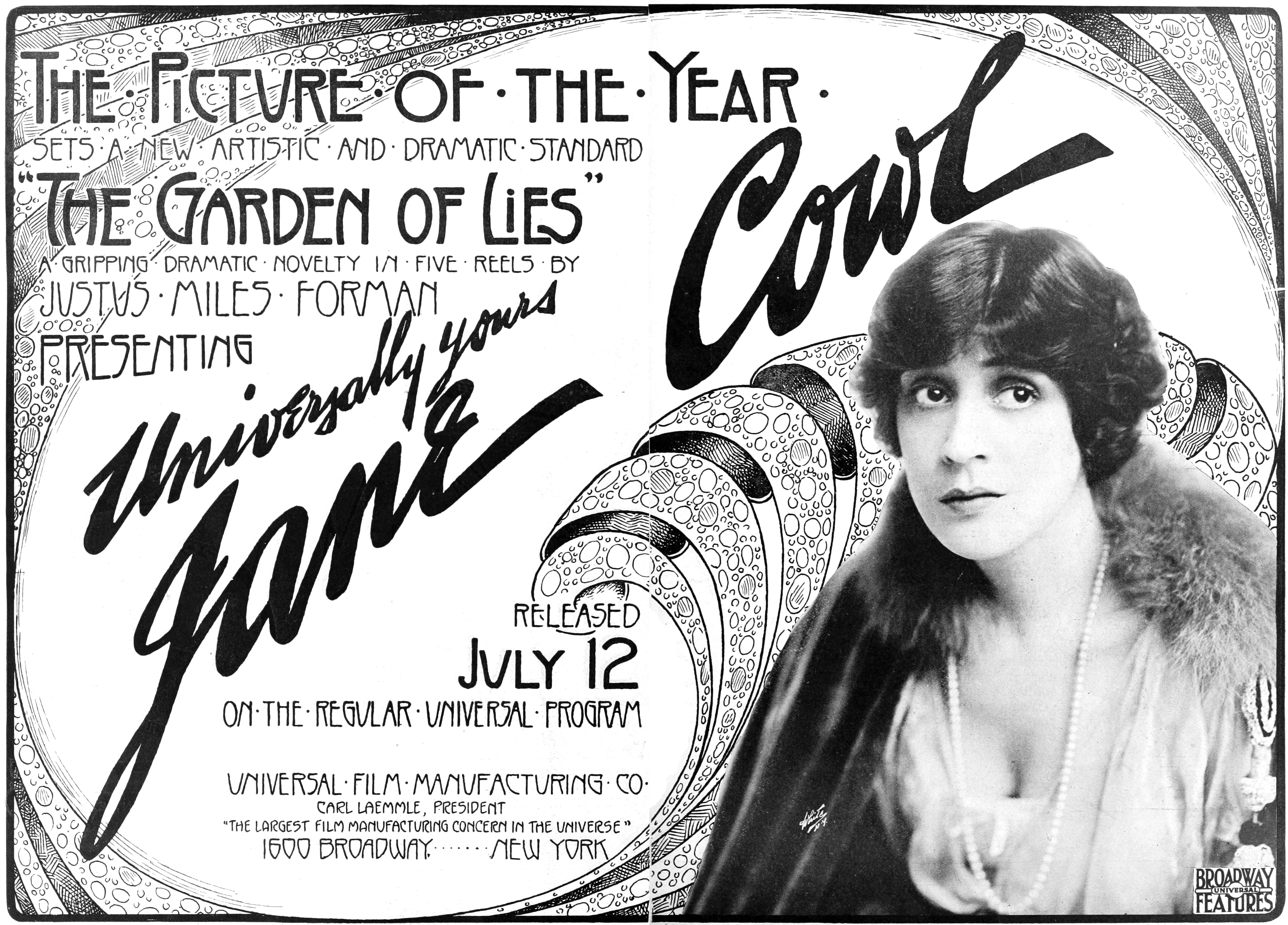
- 1915 advertisement
- Directed by: Jack Pratt
- Written by: Louis Reeves Harrison
- Based on: novel, Garden of Lies, by Justus Miles Forman
- Produced by: All Star Feature Corp
- Starring: Jane Cowl; William Russell
- Cinematography: William C. Thompson
- Production company: All Star Feature Film Corporation
- Distributed by: Alco Film Corporation; Universal Film Manufacturing Company (as Broadway Universal Feature)
- Release date: July 12, 1915
- Running time: 5 reels
- Country: USA
- Language: Silent (English intertitles)

The Garden of Lies is a 1915 silent film drama directed by Jack Pratt and starring in her debut stage actress Jane Cowl. It was based on a novel by Justus Miles Forman who perished on the Lusitania that same year. The Universal Film Manufacturing Company handled the distribution.

The film was shot in Jacksonville, Florida, St. Augustine, Florida, parts of Louisiana, and other areas around the Gulf of Mexico.

== Cast ==
- Jane Cowl - Eleanor Mannering/Princess Eleanor
- William Russell - Dennis Mallory
- Philip Hahn - Prince Carl
- Violet Horner - Jessica Mannering
- Ethelbert Hale - Von Aldorz
- David Wall - Dr. Mackenzie
- Claude Cooper - Baron Von Steinbreck
- Adele Carson - The Maid

== Preservation ==
The Garden of Lies is currently presumed lost. In February of 2021, the film was cited by the National Film Preservation Board on their Lost U.S. Silent Feature Films list.
