= Julia Dean (actress, born 1878) =

American actress

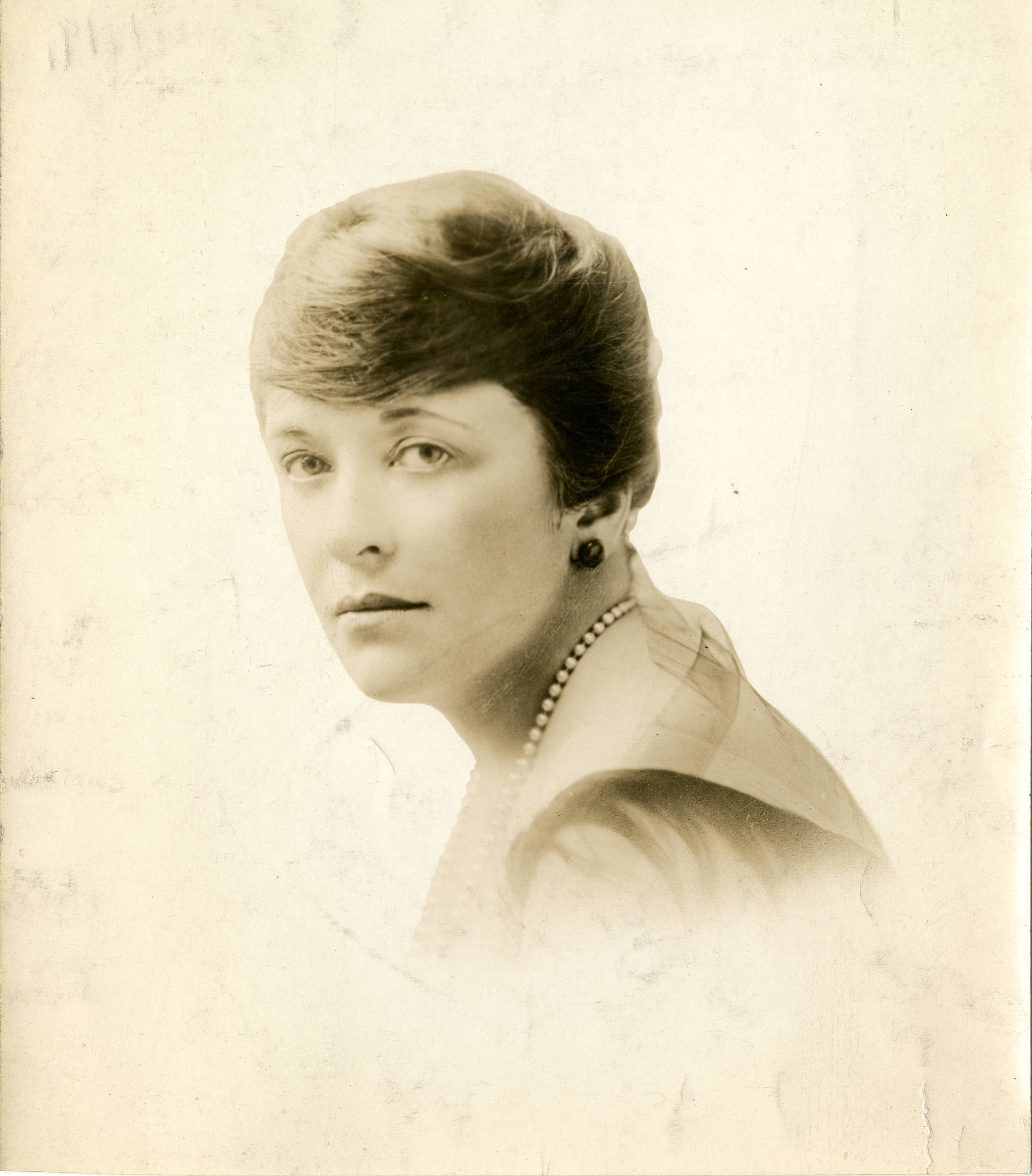
- Born: May 13, 1878; St. Paul, Minnesota, U.S.
- Died: October 17, 1952 (aged 74); Los Angeles, California, U.S.
- Other name: Mrs. Julia Dean Slocum
- Occupation: Actress
- Years active: 1895–1952
- Spouse: Orme Caldara (m. 1906; div. 1913)

Julia Dean (May 13, 1878 – October 17, 1952) was a stage and film actress who began her career in the 1890s.

== Biography ==
Julia Dean was born to Albert Clay Dean and Susan Jane Morton in St. Paul, Minnesota, in 1878. She had a sister Eloise and a brother. She made her Broadway debut December 1, 1902 in The Altars of Friendship. She toured with Joseph Jefferson and James Neill. In 1907 she appeared with Maclyn Arbuckle in The Round-Up. She worked for producers William A. Brady and David Belasco. In 1914-1915 she had significant success portraying Margaret Harding, a battered woman who kills her husband to protect her young son, in George Broadhurst's The Law of the Land at Broadway's 48th Street Theatre.

She began making silent pictures in 1915 and continued until 1919. She then devoted her career to the stage until 1944 when she returned to films in The Curse of the Cat People. She continued to appear in film noir classics like Nightmare Alley lending her support in many uncredited roles. She died in Hollywood in 1952.

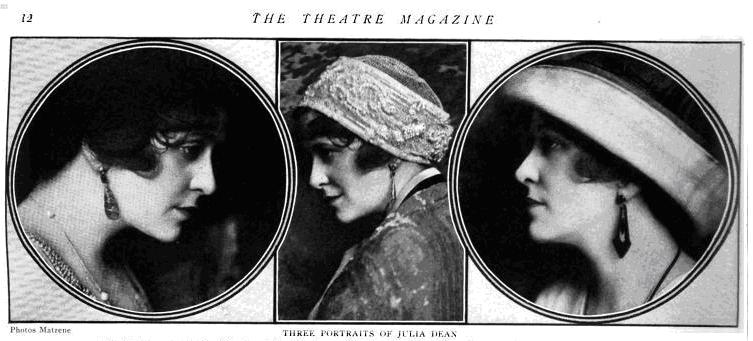
The Theatre Magazine (1919)

== Family ==
She was married to Frank Slocum (a.k.a. Orme Caldara; 1875–1925) from 1906 to 1913. She was the niece of 19th-century actress Julia Dean.

== Filmography ==
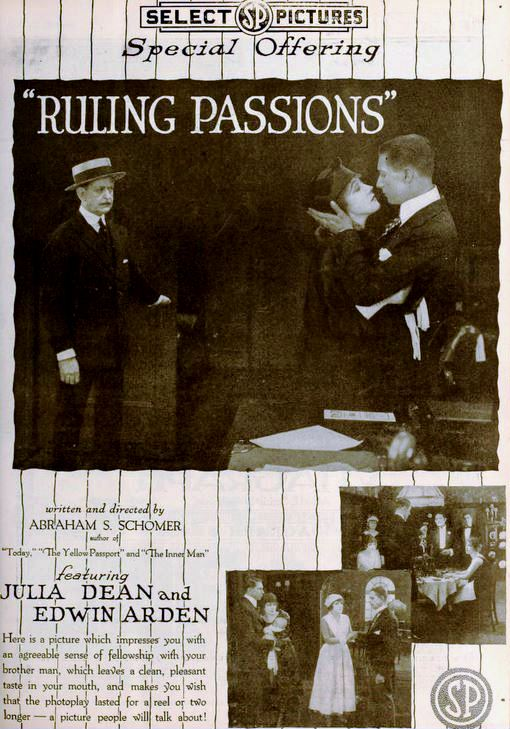
Ad for the American film Ruling Passions (1918) with Julia Dean and Edwin Arden

Silent

- How Molly Made Good (1915) (* herself; cameo appearance, with her sister Eloise) - Herself
- Judge Not; or The Woman of Mona Diggings (1915) - Molly Hanlon
- Matrimony (1915, Short) - Diana Rossmore
- The Ransom (1916) - Janet Osborne
- Rasputin, the Black Monk (1917) - Mme. Vasta, Lady in waiting
- Ruling Passions (1918) - Eveline Roland
- A Society Exile (1919) - Lady Doris Furnival
- An Honorable Cad (1919, Short)

Sound

- The Curse of the Cat People (1944) - Mrs. Julia Farren
- Experiment Perilous (1944) - Deria
- Do You Love Me (1946) - Mrs. Allen (uncredited)
- O.S.S. (1946) - Madame Prideaux
- Out of the Blue (1947) - Miss Ritchie
- Magic Town (1947) - Mrs. Wilton
- Nightmare Alley (1947) - Addie Peabody (uncredited)
- The Emperor Waltz (1948) - Archduchess Stephanie
- Easy Living (1949) - Mrs. Belle Ryan
- Girls' School (1950) - Emily Matthews
- People Will Talk (1951) - Old Lady (uncredited)
- Elopement (1951) - Mrs. Simpson (uncredited)
- At Sword's Point (1952) - Madame D'Artagnan (uncredited)
- You for Me (1952) - Aunt Clara Chadwick (uncredited)
