= The Tiger's Trail =

1919 film

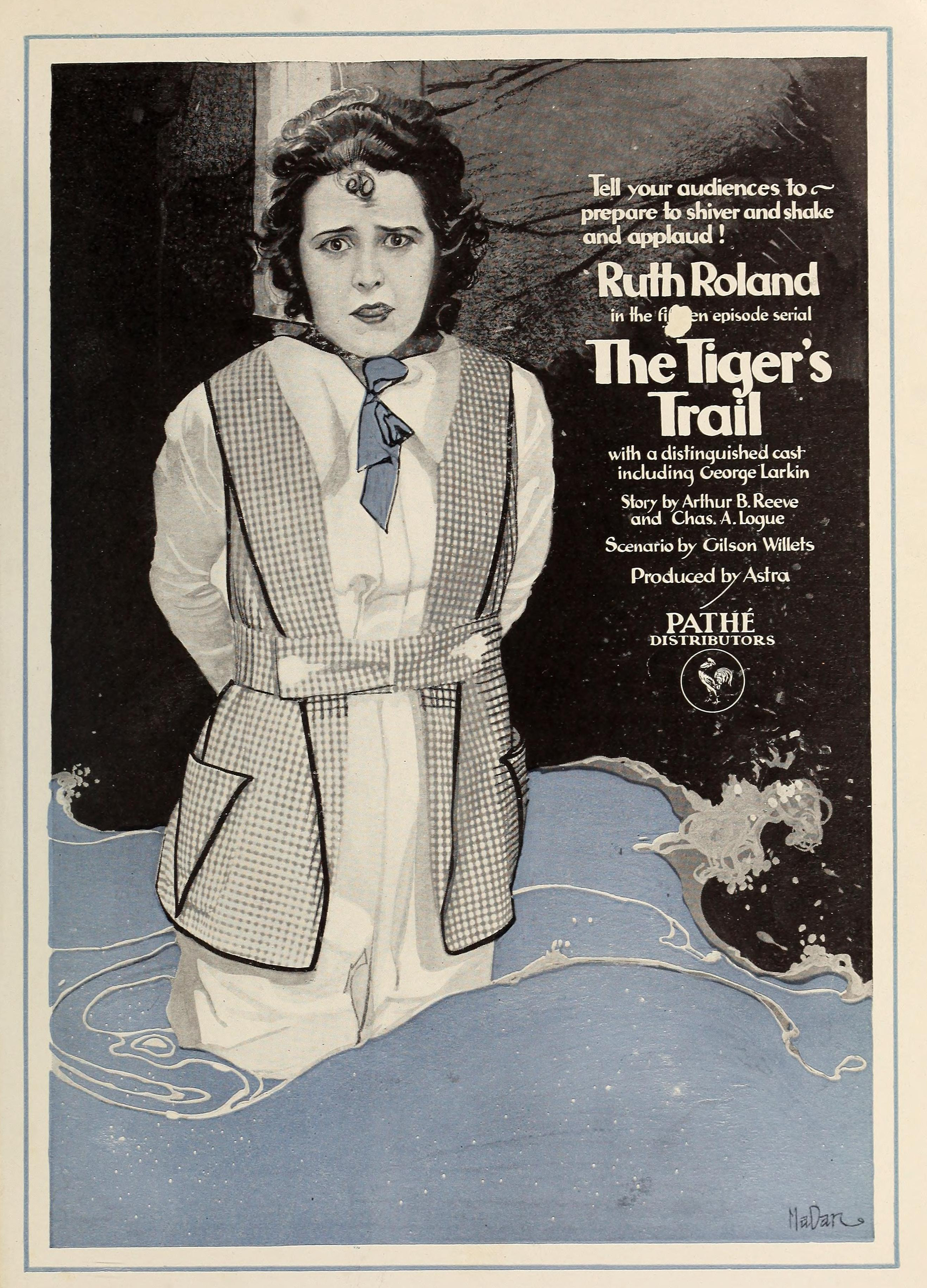
- Advert for film
- Directed by: Robert Ellis; Louis J. Gasnier; Paul Hurst
- Screenplay by: Gilson Willets
- Story by: Charles A. Logue
- Based on: The Long Arm by Arthur B. Reeve
- Starring: Ruth Roland; George Larkin
- Distributed by: Pathé Exchange; Astra Films
- Release date: April 20, 1919
- Running time: 15 episodes
- Country: United States
- Language: Silent (English intertitles)

The Tiger's Trail is a 1919 American adventure film serial starring Ruth Roland, directed by Robert Ellis, Louis J. Gasnier and Paul Hurst. A "fragmentary print" from the serial survives.

== Plot ==
As described in a film magazine, Grim Gordon is in possession of the Tiger Idol, stolen from a religious sect of Hindu tiger worshipers on an East Indian island that he and Peter Strong and Col. Boyd visited years earlier. The two latter men were killed, but Belle Boyd, daughter of the colonel, is alive and has part of the "Pact of Three," a document torn into three parts that shows the location of a treasure discovered during the expedition.

Gordon has a pitchblende mine in the western United States, and among the workers are Hindus and Tiger Worshipers. Upon her arrival from an eastern school, Belle Boyd, ward of Gordon, is attacked by a gang of outlaws headed by Bull Shotwell, but her life is saved by Jack Randall, a mining engineer. Jack is employed by Gordon but helps the heroine Belle in outwitting the evil forces surrounding her that are attempting to obtain her portion of the torn Pact of Three. In one episode Belle is put into a cage with a live Bengal tiger, and in others she is the subject of several kidnapping attempts.

== Cast ==
- Ruth Roland as Belle Boyd
- George Larkin as Jack Randall
- Mark Strong as Randolph "Grim" Gordon
- Harry Moody as Tiger Face
- Fred Kohler as "Bull" Shotwell
- George Field as Salonga
- Easter Walters as Hilda, the Spy
- Bud Osborne as a henchman
- Rose Dione as Faro Nell (Dance Hall Queen)

== Production ==
This serial, about a Hindu tiger worshiping sect and western outlaws, was based on The Long Arm by C. A. Logue. (SilentEra.com states that the serial was adapted by Gilson Willets from The Long Arm by Arthur B. Reeve).

Real tigers were used in filming. The serial includes the "famous scene" of a human chain formed from the roof of a train, which enables the criminals to steal a valuable parcel from Ruth's compartment.

== Episodes ==
1. The Tiger Worshippers
2. The Glowing Eyes
3. The Human Chain
4. Danger Signals
5. The Tiger Trap
6. The Secret Assassin
7. The Flaming Waters
8. Danger Ahead
9. The Raging Torrent
10. Bringing In The Law
11. In The Breakers
12. The Two Amazons
13. The False Idol
14. The Mountain Hermit
15. The Tiger Face
