= In Slumberland =

1917 film by Irvin Willat

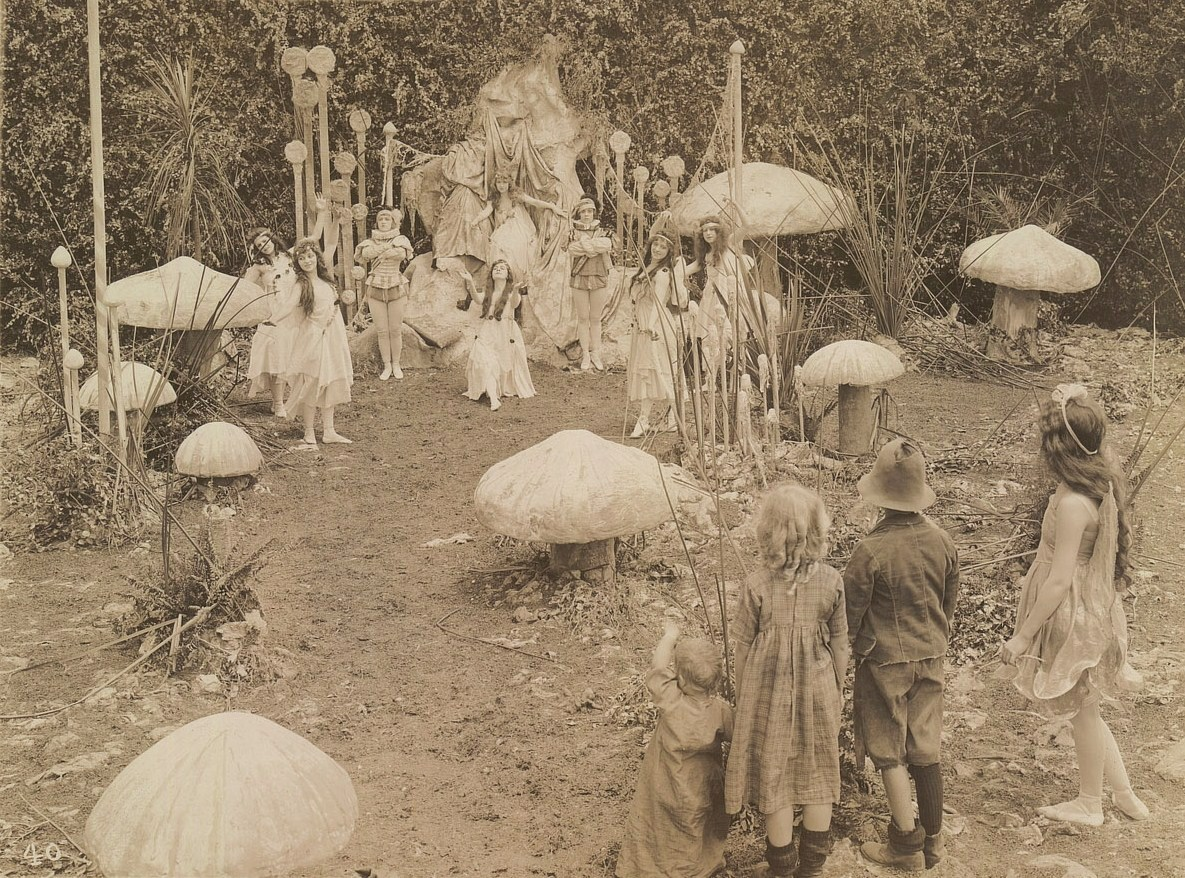

In Slumberland is a 1917 American fantasy film. Written by L. V. Jefferson, it was directed by Irvin Willat. It is a lost film.

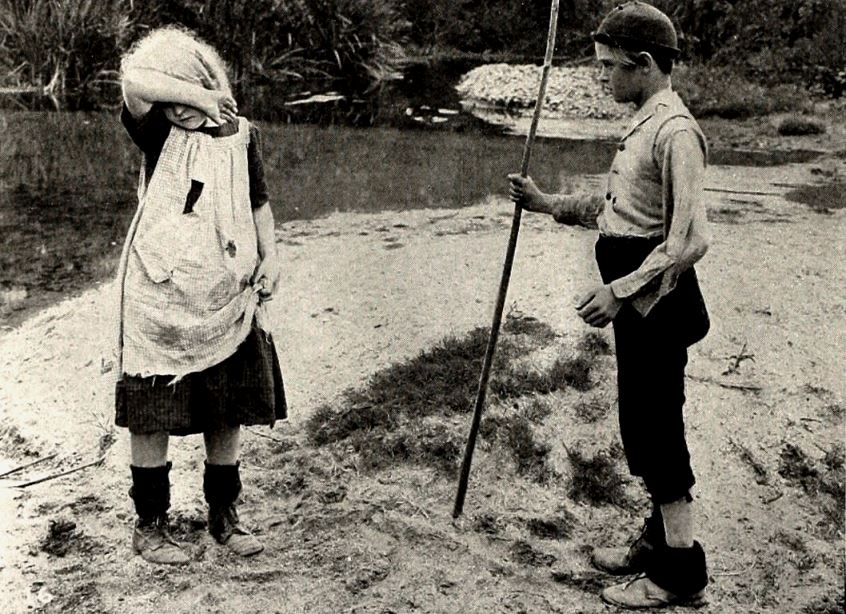
Still from the film

It was a five-reel film described as a charming Irish idyll fairytale it is set in an Irish village. The story includes an Irish soldier, his wife, and young daughter who is sent off to war through the machinations of a covetous landlord. Fairies come to the family's rescue. It was Willat's directorial debut. Motography described it as a spectacular kiddie feature and noted it included several hundred children and professional dancers as elves.

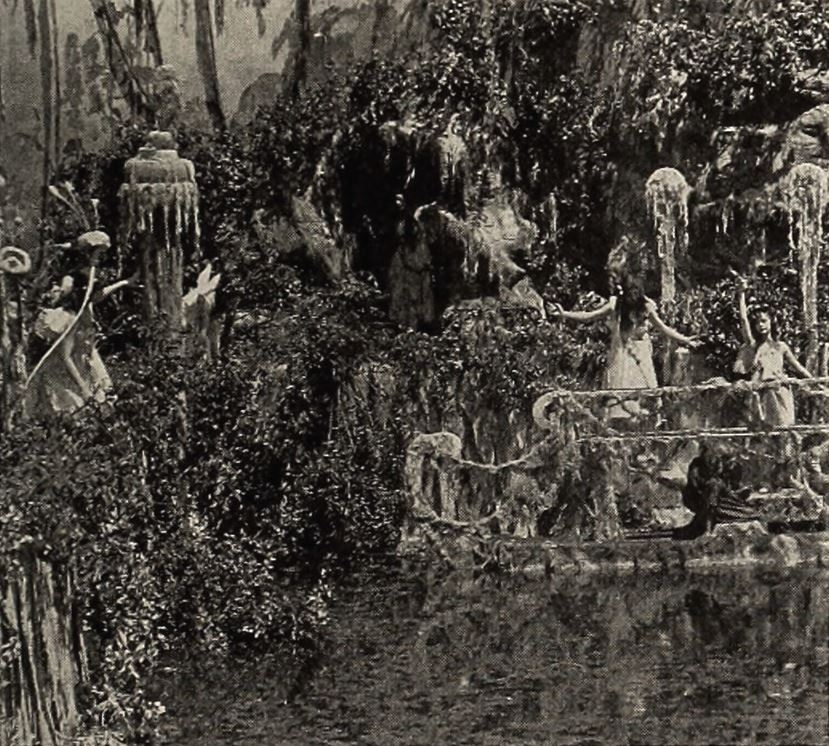

== Cast ==
- Thelma Salter as Eileen McCree the heroine
- Laura Sears as Nora McCree
- Jack Livingston as Patrick McCree
- J. P. Lockney as Peter Kennedy
- Walter Perry as Flynn, the Bog Man
- Georgie Stone of The Triangle Kiddies

== See also ==
- List of American films of 1917
- Little Nemo in Slumberland
