= Smilin' Through (1932 film) =

1932 film

- Theatrical poster
- Directed by: Sidney Franklin
- Screenplay by: Donald Ogden Stewart; Ernest Vajda
- Based on: Smilin' Through (play); 1919 play by Jane Cowl; Jane Murfin
- Produced by: Albert Lewin
- Starring: Norma Shearer; Fredric March; Leslie Howard
- Cinematography: Lee Garmes
- Edited by: Margaret Booth
- Music by: William Axt; Arthur A. Penn
- Distributed by: Metro-Goldwyn-Mayer
- Release date: September 24, 1932
- Running time: 98 minutes
- Country: United States
- Language: English
- Budget: $851,000
- Box office: $2,033,000

Smilin' Through is a 1932 American pre-Code MGM romantic drama film based on the 1919 play of the same name written by Jane Cowl and Jane Murfin under the pseudonym of Allan Langdon Martin. It was adapted from the play by James Bernard Fagan, Donald Ogden Stewart, Ernest Vajda and Claudine West. The film was directed by Sidney Franklin and stars Norma Shearer, Fredric March, Leslie Howard and Ralph Forbes.

The film is a remake of an earlier 1922 silent version, also directed by Franklin and starring Norma Talmadge.

Smilin' Through was nominated for the Academy Award for Best Picture for 1932. As a published work from 1932, the film will enter the American public domain on January 1, 2028.

== Plot ==
In 1898, John Carteret is standing by the grave of Moonyean Clare (1849–1868). At home in his garden, he calls to her, and her spirit comes to him, wearing a wedding dress. He does not see her, but he sometimes hears her. She tells him to be patient and the years will pass quickly.

John, a wealthy man, has become a virtual recluse since Moonyean’s death. His lifelong friend Dr. Owen brings Moonyean's orphaned niece Kathleen to see him, hoping that John will adopt her. Years later, the three of them are celebrating Kathleen's birthday on June 7, 1915. John tells her that she resembles Moonyean. She knows that John mourns her aunt, but nothing more.

Caught in a violent thunderstorm with her hapless and lovelorn childhood friend Willie, Kathleen breaks into the long-deserted Wayne mansion. They find an invitation for Moonyean’s wedding. A man enters who introduces himself as Kenneth Wayne, Jeremy Wayne’s American son.

A romance between Kathleen and Kenneth develops quickly, but when Kathleen tells John of the meeting, he reacts with speechless fury. Kenneth’s father is John's long-dead mortal enemy, and John has been deprived of his vengeance. In the garden, he tells Kathleen the whole story, shown in flashback.

At a party on the night before their wedding, John only wants to listen as Moonyean sings "Smilin’ Through," ignoring Owen as he tries to warn John that his rival Jerry Wayne has been drinking heavily. Jerry comes to the back gate to talk to Moonyean, desolate and raging that she should be his. He leaves when John comes out, and the lovers share some blissful moments in the garden. In the church the next day, Jerry, drunk, stops the ceremony and tries to shoot John. Moonyean rushes forward and the bullet strikes near her heart. She dies in John’s arms as he places the ring on her finger.

When John finishes his story, Kathleen is on her knees weeping. John makes her promise never to see Kenneth again. Kenneth insists on knowing why, but he understands. However, their love proves too strong and for weeks they meet in secret at Mrs. Crouch’s tea shop, the windowpanes shaken by the guns in France.

Kathleen asks Kenneth to take her to Dover with him when his leave ends. But when John says that he will not take her back if she marries, Kenneth knows that he cannot leave Kathleen alone and without John, so they part at the station. Kathleen returns home devastated, but John has no pity because he wishes Kenneth dead. Moonyean comes to him, but his hate stands between them. She tries to make him realize that unless he can right this wrong, he can never come to her.

With World War I ending, Kathleen meets a troop train but cannot find Kenneth. Owen tends to the wounded and finds Kenneth among them. Both his legs are badly injured, but Kenneth makes Owen promise that he will not tell Kathleen. He has been discharged and plans to sail for America the next day. However, Owen does tell John of Kenneth's plan. Kathleen notices a light at the Wayne mansion and runs over. Kenneth hides his crutches and pretends that he no longer cares for her. After she leaves, he breaks down.

Finally discarding his hatred and desire for revenge, John tells Kathleen the truth and asks her to bring Kenneth back with her. On her way, she sees Owen and sends him to John. The old friends sit down to play chess, but John dozes off. Amused, Owen leaves him to his nap. But John has died; young again, he is reunited with Moonyean. They watch as Kathleen helps Kenneth walk to the house, and then the ghostly lovers drive off in a spectral carriage, feted by the spirits of their wedding guests.

== Cast ==
- Norma Shearer as Kathleen (credited)/Moonyean (uncredited)
- Fredric March as Kenneth Wayne (credited)/Jeremy Wayne (uncredited)
- Leslie Howard as Sir John Carteret
- O. P. Heggie as Dr. Owen
- Ralph Forbes as Willie Ainley
- Beryl Mercer as Mrs. Crouch
- Margaret Seddon as Ellen, the Maid
- Forrester Harvey as Orderly
- Herbert Bunston as Minister (uncredited)
- Mary Carlisle as Young Party Guest (uncredited)
- Cora Sue Collins as Young Kathleen (uncredited)
- Claude King as Richard Clare, Moonyeen's Father (uncredited)
- David Torrence as Gardener (uncredited)

== Production ==
Significant differences exist in the story in comparison with the 1922 silent film. The 1941 version, though not a shot-for-shot remake, does incorporate several key scenes from the 1932 film verbatim, while adding material that focuses more on World War II, including patriotic songs performed by Jeanette MacDonald.

The song "Smilin’ Through" was first published in 1919 at the time when the original play was written. The song is heard in the play and in all three film adaptions, including as musical accompaniment in the 1922 silent version. Norma Shearer's singing voice was dubbed by Georgia Stark.

Stewart said he got the job as "having acquired a reputation as a humorist because of my books" the film "wasn’t exactly a laugh riot. Irving Thalberg needed some help with the dialogue there; they had shot half of it, I think, and I rewrote some of the scenes. That was my first real introduction to Hollywood."

The film was rereleased in 1935. According to the MGM "Campaign Book”, it was brought back "by public demand."

== Box office ==
The film grossed a total (domestic and foreign) of $2,033,000: $1,004,000 from the U.S. and Canada and $1,029,000 elsewhere, resulting in a profit of $529,000.

== Awards and honors ==
In 1934, Smilin' Through was nominated for the Academy Award for Outstanding Production at the 6th Academy Awards.

In 2002, the American Film Institute nominated the film for inclusion in its AFI's 100 Years...100 Passions list.

== See also ==
- Smilin' Through (1922 film)
- Smilin' Through (1941 film)
- Smilin' Through (play)
- Smilin' Through (song)
