= Easter Walters =

American actress

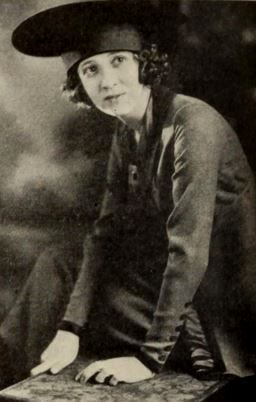
- Easter Walters, from a 1919 publication
- Born: Fern Easter Walters; March 25, 1894; Chariton, Iowa, U.S.
- Died: September 25, 1987 (aged 93); San Diego, California, U.S.
- Other names: Fern Easter Kinch, Ester Kinch
- Occupation: Actress

Fern Easter Walters Kinch (March 25, 1894 – September 25, 1987) was an American actress and stuntwoman, with credits in at least five silent films.

== Early life ==
Walters was born in Chariton, Iowa, the daughter of A. C. Walters and Cora O. Boyd Walters. She moved to Los Angeles by 1910, with her widowed mother and older brother, and was described as "a California girl" in publicity.

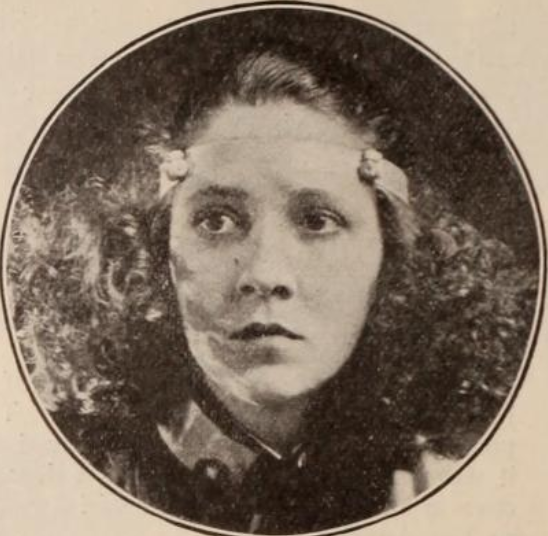
Easter Walters, from a 1919 publication

== Career ==
Walters was known for her ability operate and do stunts on a motorcycle, a novelty for silent films. She also drove a motorcycle off-screen. She made films for the Pathé company at Astra, including two starring Ruth Roland: Hands Up (1918), The Narrow Path (1918), Common Clay (1919), The Tiger's Trail (1919), and The Devil's Riddle (1920).

In 1921, Walters was charged with disturbing the peace, but found not guilty, in connection with a larger series of scandals involving Count Armand D'Aleria, his mother, and his wife, Kate Nixon D'Aleria. The count and Walters may have shared an affair, or just a friendship; his possible love letters to her were considered as evidence in his examination by a lunacy commission that year.

== Personal life ==
Walters married railroad official Harry Galivan Churchill Kinch in 1911. Her husband died in 1978, and she died in 1987, at the age of 93, in San Diego, California.
