= Smilin' Through (play) =

1919 play

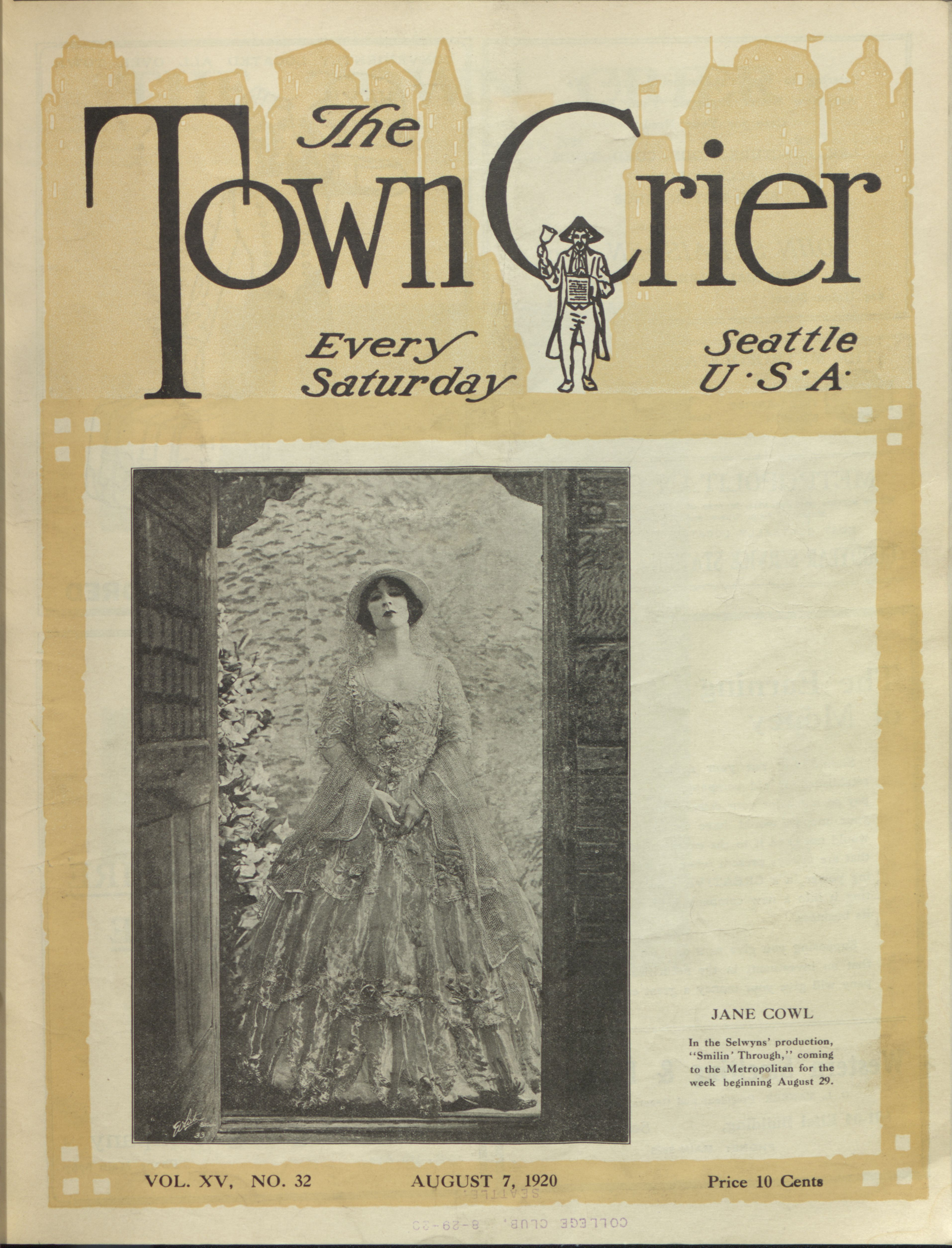
- This 1920 cover of Seattle magazine The Town Crier shows Jane Cowl in a stage production of Smilin' Through.
- Written by: Allan Langdon Martin, pseudonym for Jane Cowl and Jane Murfin
- Characters: Kathleen Dungannon; Moonyean Clare; John Carteret; Kenneth Wayne; Jeremiah Wayne
- Original language: English
- Genre: Romantic drama
- Setting: The Carteret Garden, Dunstable, England

Premiere
- Date premiered: December 30, 1919
- Place premiered: Broadhurst Theatre; New York City

Smilin' Through is a 1919 play by Jane Cowl and Jane Murfin, written under a pseudonym, Allan Langdon Martin. Cowl also starred in the play in a double role and co-directed it with Priestly Morrison. Smilin' Through was produced by The Selwyns and opened at the Broadhurst Theatre on Broadway on December 30, 1919. It included in the cast Orme Caldara as Kenneth and Jeremiah Wayne, Henry Stephenson as John Carteret and Ethelbert D. Hales as Dr. Owen Harding. Scenic design was by Joseph Urban. The play was a popular hit and ran for 175 performances. It also played for a long run on the road, and was one of Jane Cowl's greatest commercial successes.

The story is a sentimental romantic tale of a young Irish woman, Kathleen Dungannon. Her romantic attachment to Kenneth Wayne is opposed by her adopted father John Carteret, who bears the painful memory of his thwarted love for her aunt, Moonyean Clare. Moonyean visits John as a ghost. The roles of Kathleen and Moonyean were both played by Jane Cowl.

The popular story was first filmed in 1922 by First National Pictures, and was later remade twice by MGM, in 1932 and 1941. In 1932, it was also made into an unsuccessful Broadway operetta, Through the Years, with music by Vincent Youmans. The title song of the operetta, however, became a hit.

Smilin' Through is also the title of a 1919 ballad with lyrics and music by Arthur A. Penn. The creation of the song and play were independent but intertwined. According to Isidore Witmark in his history of the Witmark and Sons publishing house, Cowl's play was partially rewritten after the song was published, based upon the imagery of the lyrics. Both the title and the music of the song were incorporated into the play when it was completed and produced.

== See also ==
- Smilin' Through (1922 film)
- Smilin' Through (1932 film)
- Smilin' Through (1941 film)
- Smilin' Through (song)
