= Common Clay (play) =

1914 play by Cleves Kinkead

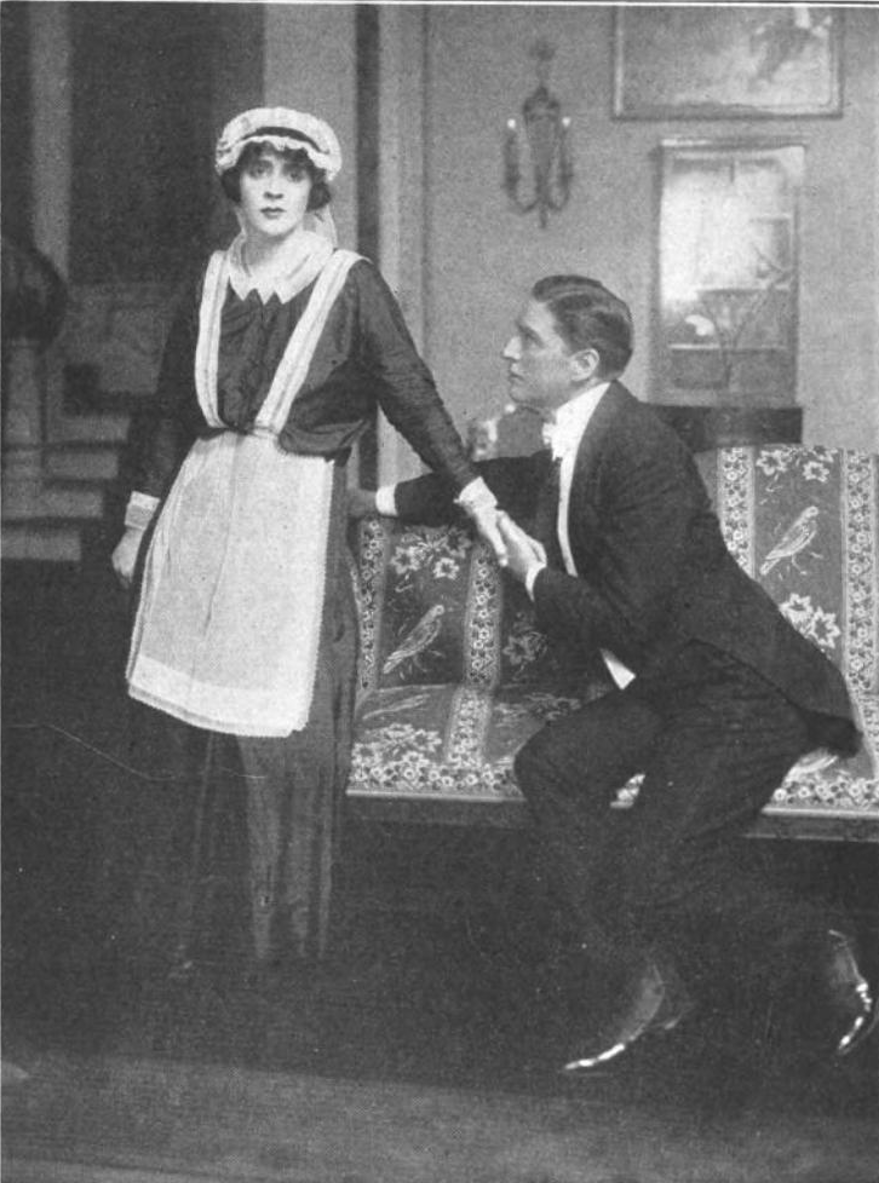
- Jane Cowl and Orme Caldara
- Original language: English
- Written by: Cleves Kinkead
- Subject: Injustice towards women
- Genre: Drama
- Setting: Fullerton Home; Filson's Law Office; Police Court Room

Premiere
- Date: August 26, 1915
- Place: Theatre Republic
- Directed by: Al Roberts (Boston); Byron Ongley (Broadway)

Common Clay is a 1914 play by Cleves Kinkead. Its structure varied by production: it started with a prologue, three acts and an epilogue. The prologue was later dropped, and still later, the epilogue was converted to a fourth act. It has three settings, and fourteen characters. The story concerns the dismissal of a young servant when she becomes pregnant by her employer's son, and her subsequent fight for justice. The action of the play spans ten years time. The play won the John Craig Prize, also referred to as the Harvard Prize, given annually to the best work produced in conjunction with George Pierce Baker's playwriting workshop at Harvard.

The play was first produced by John Craig and Cleves Kinkead, staged by Al Roberts, and featured members of Craig's stock company, including Mary Young and Alfred Lunt. The opening engagement at Boston started in January 1915 and ran through to early May, for 204 performances.

A. H. Woods acquired the rights to produce Common Clay for Broadway from Craig and Kincaid. Byron Ongley restaged it, while the stars were Jane Cowl and John Mason. The play made its Broadway premiere in August 1915, running through to June 1916, for 330 performances.

The play was never revived on Broadway, but was adapted for a 1919 silent film, a 1930 early sound film, and a 1936 movie called Private Number.

== Characters ==
Characters are listed in order of appearance within their scope, as according to the published play.

Lead

- Richard Fullerton is a wealthy upper class head of family, an old friend of Judge Filson.
- Ellen Neal is 20, a bright young woman from a lower class background, with a talent for singing.
- Judge Samuel Filson is the middle-aged bachelor owner of a law practice, with a secret past.

Supporting

- Arthur Coakley is a "social souse", a weak, high-living rake who lives with his mother.
- Hugh Fullerton is a football-playing college student, the son of Richard Fullerton.
- W. P. Yates is a shyster attorney for Ellen when she seeks financial protection for her son.
- Mrs. Neal is the woman who raised Ellen as her daughter.

Featured

- Mrs. Fullerton, called Evelyn, is wife to Richard, and mother to Hugh and Anne.
- Edwards is a butler in the Fullerton home, a bully who overcompensates for his Cockney accent.
- Anne Fullerton is sister to Hugh; she has just gotten engaged.
- Judge of Police Court

Bit Players

- Miss Warren is stenographer to Judge Filson.
- Clerk of Police Court
- Bailiff of Police Court
- Policemen, guests, servants, courtroom onlookers

Voice only

- Cabby is heard helping Coakley out of Fullerton house into a cab.

== Synopsis ==
The play as first presented had both a prologue and an epilogue, each set ten years in the future of the main action. By the time it reached Broadway it consisted of three acts and an epilogue. The 1917 published play replaced the epilogue with a fourth act. The location is "an American city".

Prologue (Library of the Fullerton's home. January, 1915) The actress Penelope Gail has been invited to visit by Hugh Fullerton. She tells him the beginning of a true story that occurred ten years before to Ellen Neal, as a lead-in to the play's three acts. (Curtain)

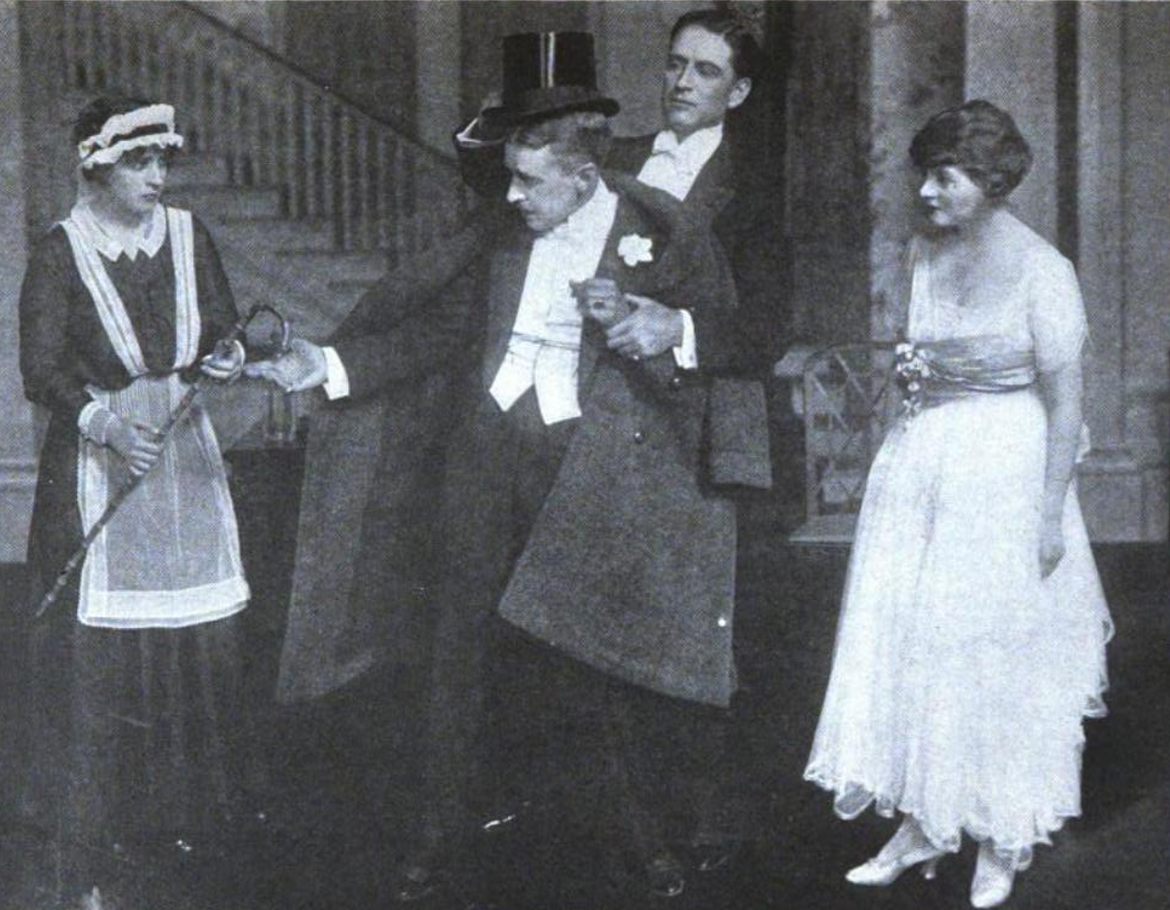

Act I (Library of the Fullerton's home. Christmas, 1904) Ellen, while serving guests at the Fullerton's holiday dance, encounters Arthur Coakley, the man who seduced her last year. He attempts renewed familiarity, but is slapped and vows revenge. Hugh has witnessed the scene. He questions Coakley, who reveals he met Ellen at Bender's Dance Hall, and later took her to a house of assignation. When the drunken Coakley tries to kiss Anne, Hugh puts him into a cab. Hugh now starts working on Ellen, determined to have his own bit of fun with her. Ellen admits she likes him, and after some resistance, gives in to Hugh. (Curtain)

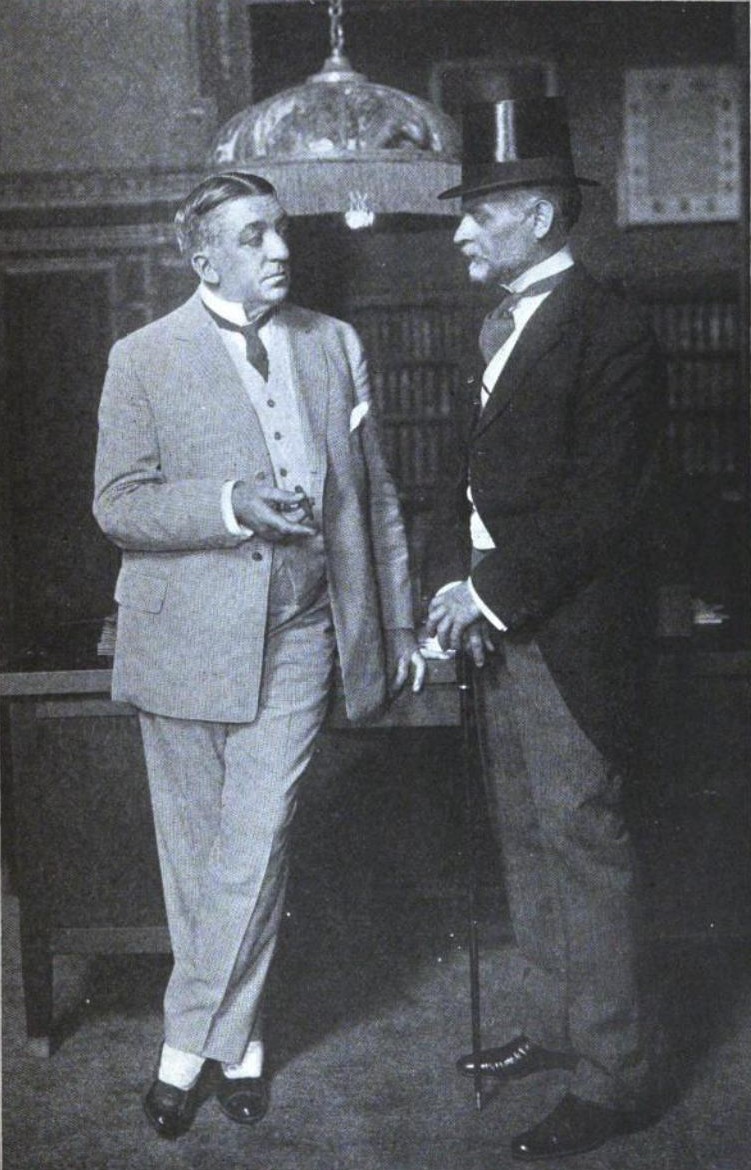

Act II (Filson's law office, October 9, 1905.) Richard Fullerton comes to Judge Filson's office to ask help for his son Hugh. A servant became pregnant and was dismissed. She now accuses Hugh of being the father of her son. She wants Hugh to acknowledge the boy and Fullerton to fund his upbringing. Upon questioning, Filson learns W. P. Yates is representing Ellen Neal, and that Hugh admits to the relationship. However, Richard has discovered a witness, Arthur Coakley, who can testify to the woman's bad character. Coakley is summoned, and tells his history with Ellen. When Yates and his client arrive they are confronted with him. But Yates turns the tables by swearing out a warrant against Coakley for having corrupted a minor. Coakley demands Filson defend him, while Fullerton uses his influence to suppress newspaper coverage. (Curtain)

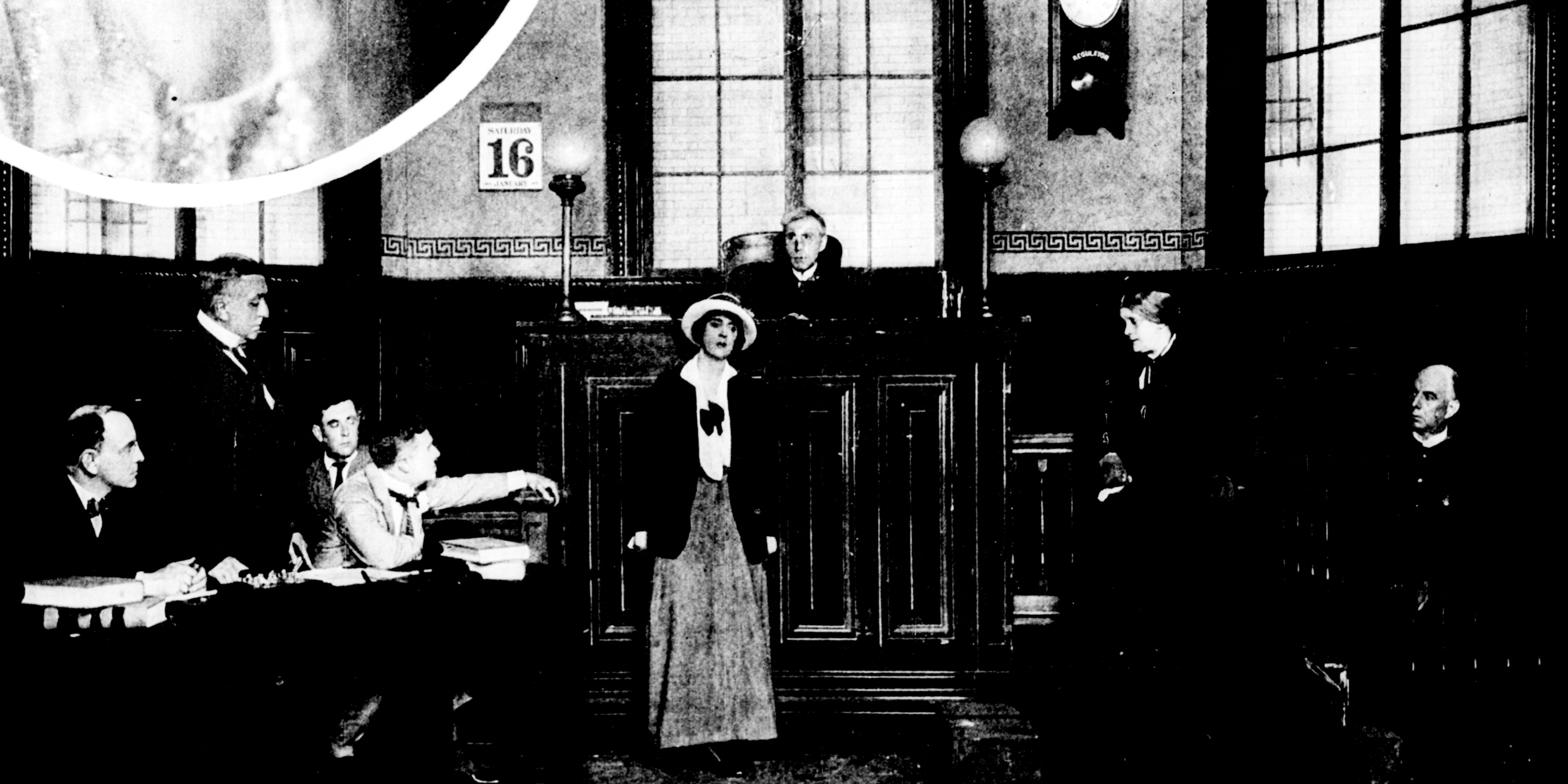

Act III (The City Court Room, the next morning.) After Ellen recounts her story in court, Yates calls Mrs. Neal to testify about Ellen's moral upbringing. But under oath, Mrs. Neal reveals Ellen is not her daughter, but that of a woman named Dolly Montrose and some big man in the city. Ellen is shocked, but so is Filson. He cannot respond to the judge's question. Ellen, upon hearing that her real mother chose not to impede the career of her father, asks the court to drop the charges against Coakley. Fullerton then agrees to set up a trust fund for the infant and to help place him with an appropriate couple. After they are alone in the court room, Filson shows Ellen the farewell note Dolly Montrose wrote him before her suicide. Ellen is now convinced he is her father. She will allow him to sponsor her further education and training as a singer. They agree to never reveal the relationship. (Curtain)

Original Epilogue (Same as Prologue, minutes later.) As Penelope finishes her story, Hugh realizes she is Ellen Neal. He is ashamed of his own behavior and asks to make amends by marrying her. Richard Fullerton objects, but Judge Filson favors the young couple. (Curtain)

Revised Epilogue (Same as Act I, January 1915.) Hugh has fallen in love with opera star Eleanor Gail. While discussing their respective pasts, she confesses to being Ellen Neal. Hugh proposes marriage, and his father Richard, not knowing her as Ellen, welcomes the famous singer with pride to their honorable family. (Curtain)

Act IV (Same as Act I, January 1915.) Unlike the epilogues, this act is dominated by conversation between Judge Filson and Richard Fullerton. Richard has realized their guest of honor, Eleanor Gail, is actually their former servant Ellen Neal. He asks why Filson brought her to the house, and sends for Hugh to have her expelled. Hugh has known who she was for three years, just as he has met their boy in Judge Filson's office. He is in love with Ellen and will marry her soon. Richard asks Hugh to leave for a few minutes, during which he grills Ellen, asking whether she is willing to plunge Hugh into unhappiness by marrying outside his class. Ellen says she will forgo Hugh only if he forgoes her. Richard is convinced and gives his blessing. (Curtain)

== Original production ==
=== Background ===
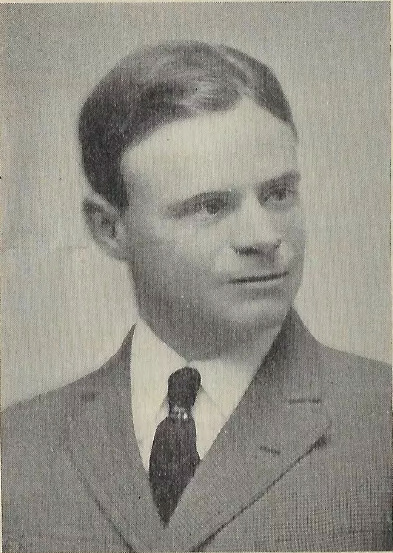
Cleves Kinkead

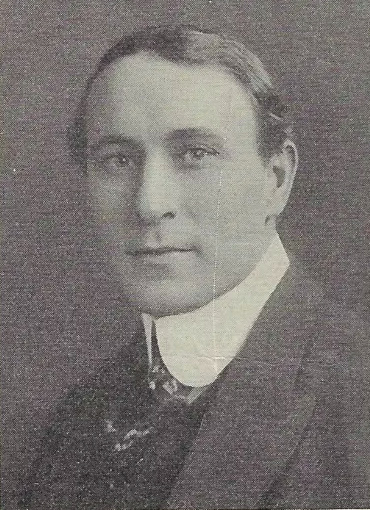
John Craig

Cleves Kinkead was an attorney from Louisville, Kentucky, a supporter of female suffrage, who donated his time to the local Legal Aid Society. He was already thirty-one and a former Kentucky state legislator when he took a course as a postgraduate at Harvard University, Professor Baker's English 47 Playwriting Workshop. The Harvard Dramatic Club performed his one-act farce, The Fourflushers, written for that course, in Spring 1914. His Common Clay won the $500 John Craig Prize in October 1914.

John Craig was the actor-manager of the Castle Square Theatre Stock Company in Boston. Each year he offered a prize to the Harvard or Radcliffe graduate or undergraduate who wrote the best play. When Kinkead won, The Harvard Crimson expressed disapproval, for he lacked the status required in the prize guidelines, having graduated from Centre College in Danville, Kentucky. Kinkead's experience working as a police court reporter in Louisville, and his knowledge of legal procedure, were employed in writing Common Clay. The court in the work was modelled after the Louisville Police Court.

=== Cast ===
Principal cast during the Boston engagement, later tryouts, and the Broadway run. The play was on hiatus from May 9 through August 1, 1915.
Role	Actor	Dates	Notes and sources
Richard Fullerton	Alfred Lunt	Jan 07, 1915 - May 8, 1915	
Richard Fullerton	Russ Whytall	Aug 02, 1915 - Jun 03, 1916	
Ellen Neal	Mary Young	Jan 07, 1915 - May 8, 1915	Young was John Craig's wife and co-manager of the Castle Square Theatre.
Ellen Neal	Jane Cowl	Aug 02, 1915 - Jun 03, 1916	
Judge Filson	John Craig	Jan 07, 1915 - May 8, 1915	
Judge Filson	John Mason	Aug 26, 1915 - Mar 25, 1916	
Judge Filson	Orme Caldara	Mar 27, 1916 - Jun 03, 1916	
Arthur Coakley	Dudley Hawley	Jan 07, 1915 - Jun 03, 1916	Hawley was one of two Boston cast members to be signed for the Broadway run.
Hugh Fullerton	William P. Carleton	Jan 07, 1915 - May 8, 1915	
Hugh Fullerton	Orme Caldara	Aug 02, 1915 - Mar 25, 1916	
Hugh Fullerton	Sydney Booth	Mar 27, 1916 - Jun 03, 1916	
W. P. Yates	Al Roberts	Jan 07, 1915 - May 8, 1915	Roberts was also responsible for staging the Boston production.
W. P. Yates	Robert McWade	Aug 02, 1915 - Feb 12, 1916	
W. P. Yates	Andrew Bennison	Feb 14, 1916 - Jun 03, 1916	
Mrs. Neal	Mabel Colcord	Jan 07, 1915 - Jun 03, 1916	Colcord was the other Boston veteran to go with the new production.
Mrs. Fullerton	Betty Barnicoat	Jan 07, 1915 - May 8, 1915	
Mrs. Fullerton	Ida Darling	Aug 02, 1915 - Jun 03, 1916	
Edwards	Irving Pichel	Jan 07, 1915 - May 8, 1915	Pichel was the stage manager for the Boston production.
Edwards	Roy Cochrane	Aug 02, 1915 - Jun 03, 1916	
Anne Fullerton	Marion Tanner	Jan 07, 1915 - May 8, 1915	
Anne Fullerton	Marguerite Anderson	Aug 02, 1915 - Jun 03, 1916	
Judge of Police Court	Morrill Morrison	Jan 07, 1915 - May 8, 1915	
Judge of Police Court	John Ravold	Aug 02, 1915 - Jun 03, 1916	

=== Opening engagement ===
The first presentation of Common Clay occurred on January 7, 1915, at the Castle Square Theatre in Boston. The reviewer for the Boston Evening Transcript was impressed with the playwriting of Kinkead. He had not only an idea to present but the skills to write a drama of the usual length without straining the audience. They felt the exposure of the Fullerton's faults overdone, and found the character of Coakley wearisome, but the acting and production were very well done. The Boston Globe reviewer was convinced of the plays future: "It has in it the elements of a Broadway success; more than that it has a message and a meaning...".

The play closed at the Castle Square Theatre on May 8, 1915, after a record-breaking run of 204 performances.

=== Tryouts ===
A. H. Woods had won the bidding war among producers for Common Clay in March 1915. By June he had signed a cast that included two Boston cast members, and announced the play would have a tryout in Atlantic City during August before opening on Broadway. Rehearsals started on July 12, 1915 under the direction of Byron Ongley.

Common Clay was presented at Nixon's Apollo Theatre in Atlantic City, New Jersey on August 2, 1915. John Mason was given first billing and Jane Cowl second, both listed below the title. Louis W. Cline wrote that the opening night was marred by rain and a leaky roof, disconcerting John Mason who already had some trouble with his lines. The play was "good, strong drama with the punch in the third act...", but would require some pruning in the second and third acts. M. R. Morris, like Cline, spoke of the play as having four acts and made no mention of a prologue. He attributed the play's appreciative recepetion by the audience to the acting of John Mason and Jane Cowl, with additional honors to Dudley Hawley and Robert McWade. Morris reported the play's excessive length, though repeated curtain calls may have prolonged it.

After a week in Atlantic City, the production moved to the Savoy Theatre in Asbury Park, New Jersey, then to the Shubert Theatre in New Haven, Connecticut.

=== Broadway premiere and reception ===
Two days before the play opened on Broadway, the New-York Tribune reported that it was in the form of three acts and an epilogue. The New York Times reviewer recounted stories that the play was "being tinkered with" before it reached New York. The premiere came on August 26, 1915, at the Theatre Republic. There was consensus among critics the third act climax (Note: Ellen's dropping the charges against Coakley.) was effective, but lessened by the following anti-climax, (Note: Filson's confession of fatherhood to Ellen.) while the epilogue was unnecessary. One reviewer pointed out the theme of "injustice towards erring women" was hardly original, having been expressed in plays such as Madame X and Hypocrites, while elements of the play verged on melodrama.

Heywood Broun, expressing a minority view, thought the play worked in the first two acts, but failed in the last. He found the repeated sobbings of characters in the courtroom scene annoying, saying "The sins of the fathers were visited upon the audience in the third act". He credited author Kinkead with sincerity, but judged his writing ineffective, while "Jane Cowl is an actress wholly lacking in subtlety". Broun concluded with the judgement that it was not a good play.

Despite mixed reviews, the play proved a popular success, occupying the Republic from opening to closing of that theatre's season. Common Clay started out being presented the usual eight times a week (two matinees and six evening shows), but by November 1915 a third weekly matinee was added. On May 11, 1916, it was played for the 300th time at the Republic.

=== Broadway closing ===
The production closed at the Republic on June 3, 1916, after 330 performances. (Note: This total includes the 300th performance reported, the remaining three performances for that week, and the 27 performances for the three weeks following.) The production was to re-open in Chicago for the next season.

== Adaptations ==
=== Literary ===
- Common Clay - A novelisation by D. Torbett, copyright to Edward J. Clode in 1916, published by Grosset & Dunlap, 1916.

=== Film ===
- Common Clay (1919 film)
- Common Clay (1930 film)
- Private Number (1936 film)

== Bibliography ==
- Kinkead, Cleves. Common Clay: A Drama in Four Acts. Samuel French, 1917.
- Torbett, D. Common Clay: A novelization of Cleves Kinkead's drama, Grossett & Dunlop, 1916.
