= Matrimony Creek =

Stream in North Carolina and Virginia, U.S.

Coordinates: 36°28′30″N 79°46′41″W

Matrimony Creek is a stream in Rockingham County, North Carolina and Henry County, Virginia.

An 18th-century bachelor named Matrimony Creek because he regarded the stream, like civil marriage, as "noisy, impetuous, and clamorous, though unsullied".

This greenway stretches a little over a mile in each direction, winding through scenic groves of brush, some overhanging for cool shade from harsh summer sun. Towards its western edge, a rushing stream flows as a waterfall converges just below the Center Church street bridge.

== See also ==
- List of rivers of North Carolina
- List of rivers of Virginia
