= Matrimony (film) =

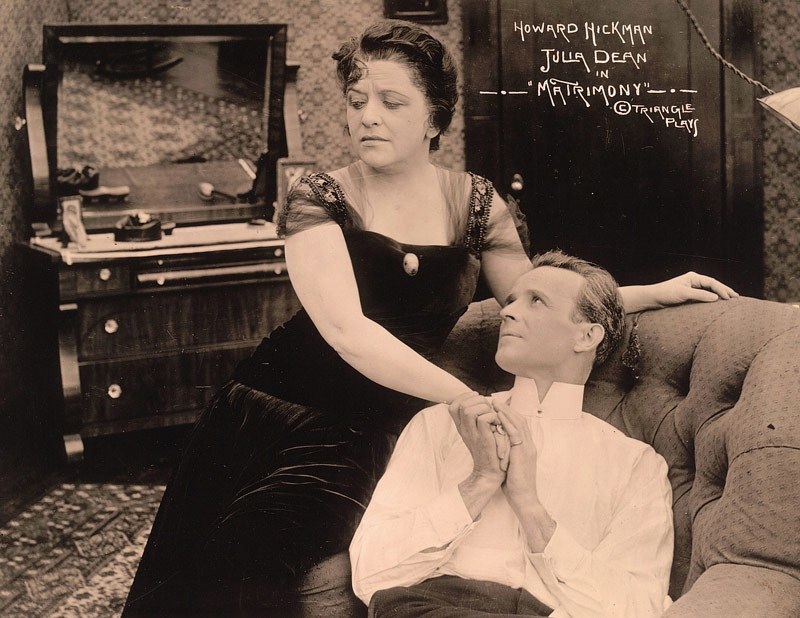
- Julia Dean and Howard C. Hickman in Matrimony (1915) - publicity still.
- Directed by: Scott Sidney
- Written by: C. Gardner Sullivan
- Produced by: Thomas H. Ince
- Starring: Julia Dean
- Cinematography: Devereaux Jennings (fr)(* as J.D. Jennings)
- Music by: Joseph Nurnberger; Wedgwood Nowell(musical accompaniment)
- Distributed by: Triangle Film Corporation
- Release date: November 28, 1915
- Running time: 5 reels
- Country: USA
- Language: Silent...English titles

Matrimony was a lost 1915 silent film drama directed by Scott Sidney and starring Julia Dean, and a teenaged John Gilbert. The first four of five reels were found in Russia in September, 2024, without intertitles. It was produced by Thomas H. Ince and distributed by the Triangle Film Corporation.

== Cast ==
- Julia Dean - Diana Rossmore
- Howard C. Hickman - Weston Rossmore
- Thelma Salter - Viola
- Louise Glaum - Thelma Iverson
- Betty Burbridge - Antoinette
- Lou Salter - Nurse (unconfirmed)
