= Bright Lights (1925 film) =

1925 film by Robert Zigler Leonard

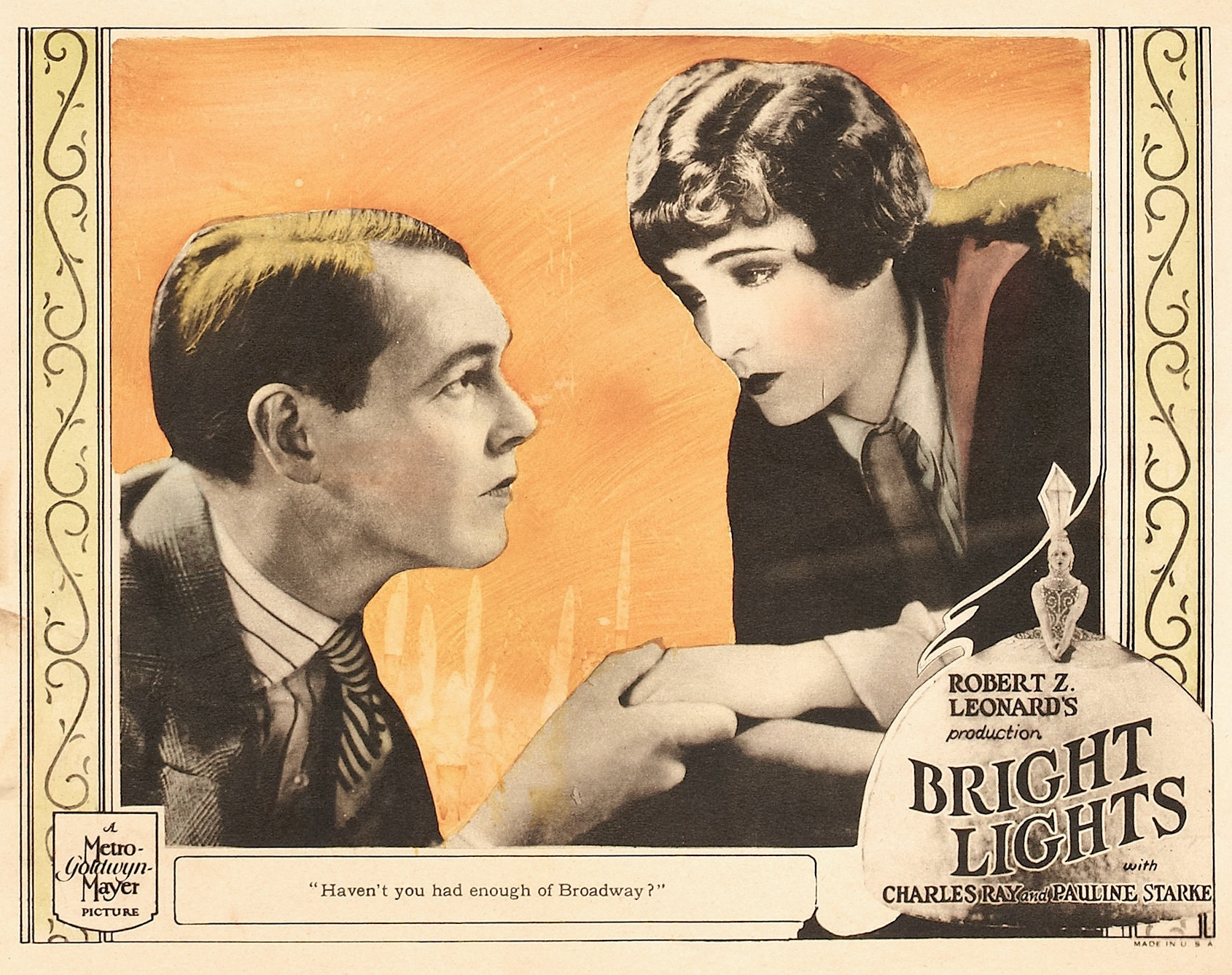
- Lobby card
- Directed by: Robert Z. Leonard
- Written by: Jessie Burns; Lew Lipton; William Conselman (titles); Joseph Farnham (titles)
- Based on: "A Little Bit of Broadway"; 1924 story in Liberty by Richard Connell
- Starring: Charles Ray; Pauline Starke
- Cinematography: John Arnold
- Edited by: William LeVanway
- Distributed by: Metro-Goldwyn-Mayer
- Release date: November 15, 1925
- Running time: 70 minutes
- Country: United States
- Language: Silent (English intertitles)

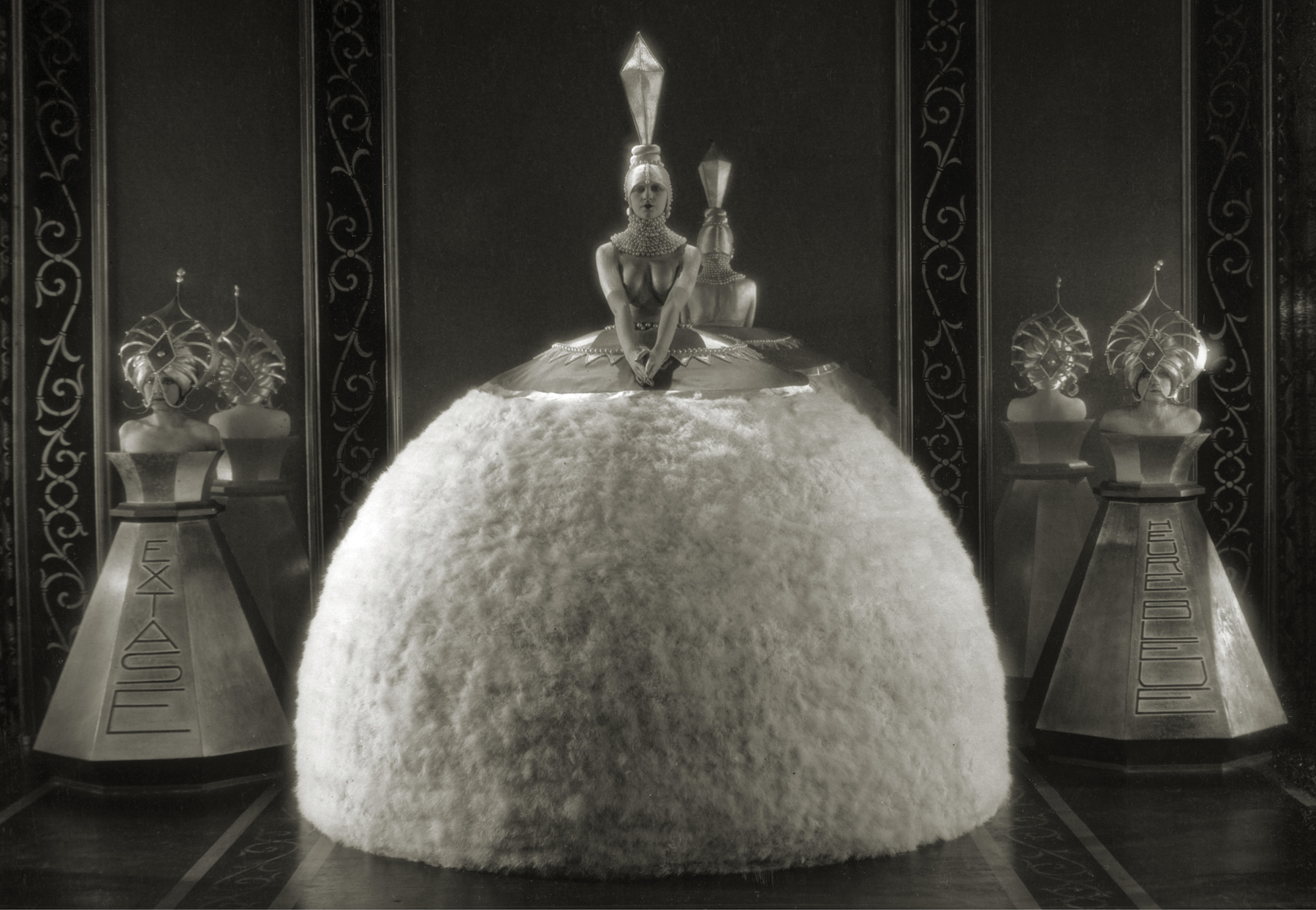
Publicity still featuring topless actresses.

Bright Lights is a 1925 American silent romantic comedy film directed by Robert Z. Leonard. The film is based on the story "A Little Bit of Broadway" by Richard Connell, and stars Charles Ray, who achieved stardom by playing ingenious country boys.

== Plot ==
As described in a review in a film magazine, Pauline is a chorus girl who is cynical toward all men. Visiting her home town she meets Tom and kids him along, but soon finds he is different and falls in love with him. He sees her with a city chap and misunderstanding, tries to make himself the kind of man he thinks she likes. The result is that he overdoes it and so disappoints her that she turns him down. Her friend puts him wise, he becomes his real whole-souled honest self once more and wins her.

== Cast ==
- Charles Ray as Tom Corbin
- Pauline Starke as Patsy Delaney
- Lilyan Tashman as Gwen Gould
- Lawford Davidson as Marty Loftus
- Ned Sparks as Barney Gallagher
- Eugenie Besserer as Patsy's mom
- Margie Angus as Cigarette Girl (uncredited)
- Mary Angus as Cigarette Girl (uncredited)

== Censorship ==
Before Bright Lights could be exhibited in Kansas, the Kansas Board of Review required the elimination of a close view of a woman's legs.

== Preservation ==
With no prints of Bright Lights located in any film archives, it is a lost film. A vintage movie trailer displaying short clips of the film still exists.
