= Smilin' Through (1941 film) =

1941 film by Frank Borzage

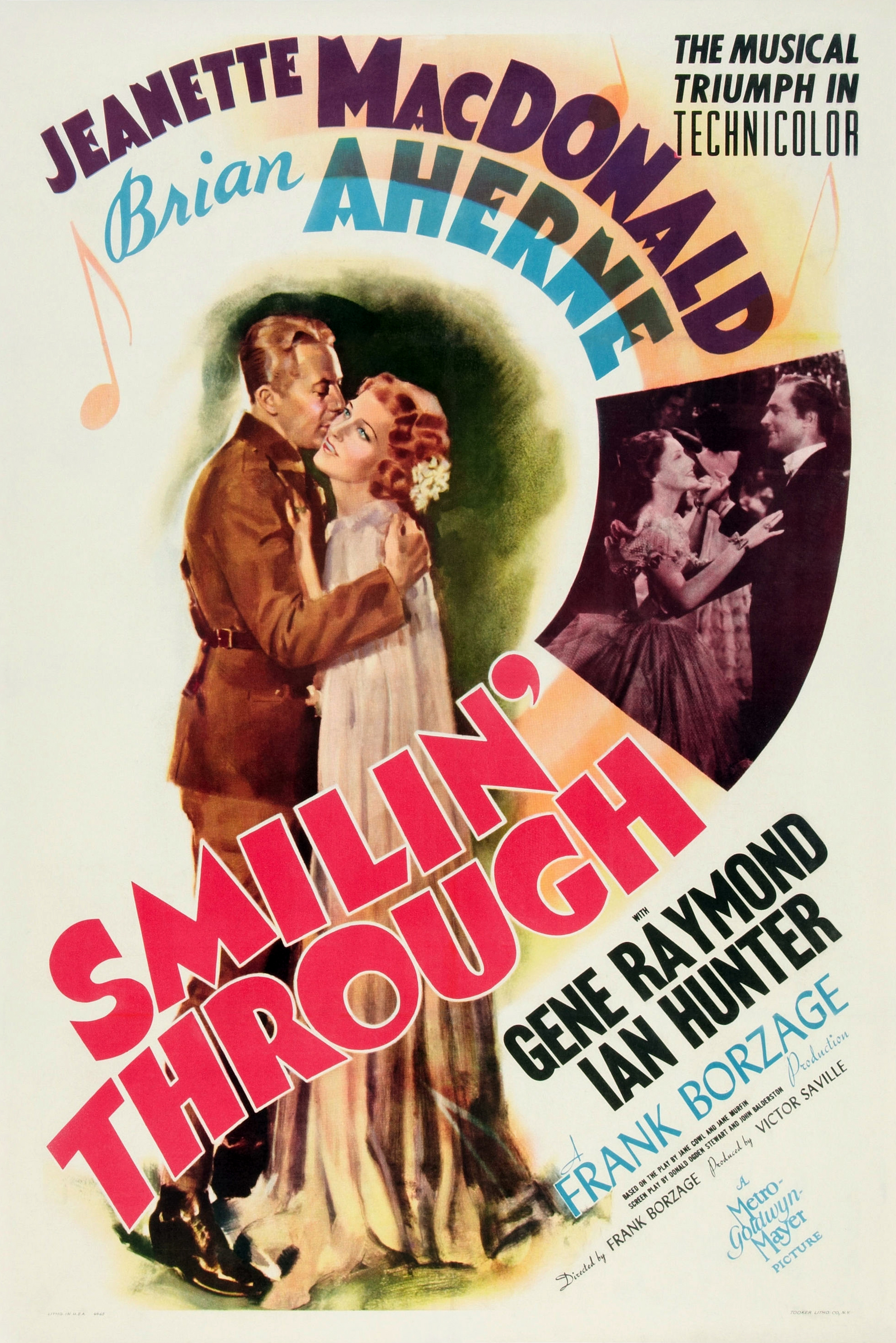
- Theatrical release poster
- Directed by: Frank Borzage
- Written by: Donald Ogden Stewart; John L. Balderston
- Based on: Smilin' Through; 1919 play by Jane Cowl and Jane Murfin
- Produced by: Frank Borzage; Victor Saville
- Starring: Jeanette MacDonald; Brian Aherne; Gene Raymond; Ian Hunter
- Cinematography: Leonard Smith
- Edited by: Frank Sullivan
- Music by: Herbert Stothart
- Color process: Technicolor
- Production company: Metro-Goldwyn-Mayer
- Distributed by: Loew's Inc.
- Release date: October 1941
- Running time: 100 minutes
- Country: United States
- Language: English
- Budget: $1,105,000
- Box office: $868,000 (Domestic earnings) $1,536,000 (Foreign earnings)

Smilin' Through is a 1941 American Technicolor musical film directed by Frank Borzage and starring Jeanette MacDonald, Brian Aherne, Gene Raymond and Ian Hunter. Produced by Metro-Goldwyn-Mayer, it is based on the 1919 play of the same name by Jane Cowl and Jane Murfin. The film was a remake of a previous 1932 version by MGM and was the third and final film version of the play. It was filmed in Technicolor and was remade as a musical for MacDonald with several older songs interpolated into the story.

== Synopsis ==
In late Victorian England Kathleen is a young Irish woman in love with an American, Kenneth Wayne. The romance, however, is opposed by her adopted father John Carteret, who recalls the painful memory of his tragically thwarted love for Kathleen's aunt, Moonyean Clare many years before.

== Cast ==
- Jeanette MacDonald as Kathleen Dungannon/ Moonyean Clare
- Brian Aherne as Sir John Carteret
- Gene Raymond as Kenneth 'Ken' Wayne / Jeremy 'Jerry' Wayne
- Ian Hunter as Reverend Owen Harding
- Frances Robinson as Ellen
- Patrick O'Moore as Willie
- Eric Lonsdale as Charles, Kenneth's Batman
- Jackie Horner as Kathleen, as a Child
- David Clyde as Sexton
- Frances Carson as Dowager
- Ruth Rickaby as Woman
- Wyndham Standing as Doctor

== Bibliography ==
- Goble, Alan. The Complete Index to Literary Sources in Film. Walter de Gruyter, 1999.
- Higgins, Scott. Harnessing the Technicolor Rainbow: Color Design in the 1930s. University of Texas Press, 2009.
