= Common Clay (1930 film) =

1930 film

- Directed by: Victor Fleming
- Written by: Cleves Kinkead (novel); Jules Furthman
- Starring: Constance Bennett; Lew Ayres
- Cinematography: Glen MacWilliams
- Edited by: Irene Morra
- Music by: Arthur Kay (uncredited)
- Distributed by: Fox Film Corporation
- Release date: August 1, 1930
- Running time: 89 min
- Country: United States
- Language: English
- Box office: $1.246 million (U.S. and Canada rentals)

Common Clay is a 1930 American pre-Code film directed by Victor Fleming and starring Constance Bennett and Lew Ayres, based on the 1915 play of the same name by Cleves Kinkead which starred Jane Cowl.

The film is about a young servant who is seduced by the master of the house who will having nothing else to do with her besides sex because she is of an inferior class. She becomes pregnant and seeks to have the child recognized but his family treats her as if she were a blackmailer.

== Cast ==
- Constance Bennett as Ellen Neal
- Lew Ayres as Hugh Fullerton
- Tully Marshall as W.H. Yates
- Matty Kemp as Arthur Coakley
- Purnell Pratt as Richard Fullerton
- Beryl Mercer as Mrs. Neal
- Charles McNaughton as Edwards
- Hale Hamilton as Judge Samuel Filson
- Genevieve Blinn as Mrs. Fullerton

== Release ==
Common Clay was one of the top ten highest-grossing films of 1930.
