= Jane Cowl =

American actress and dramatist

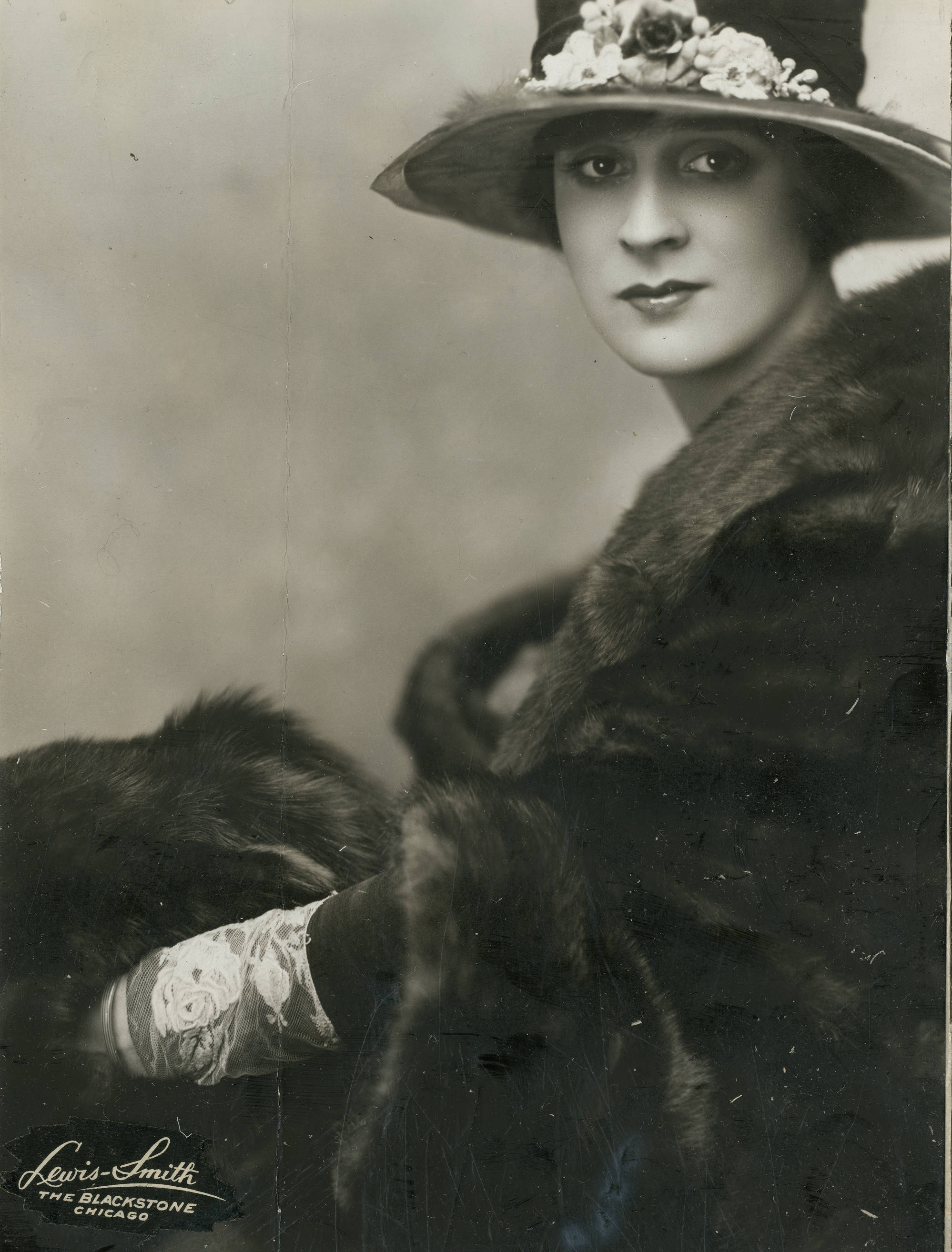
- Jane Cowl in 1920
- Born: Jane Bailey; December 14, 1883; Boston, Massachusetts, U.S.
- Died: June 22, 1950 (aged 66); Santa Monica, California, U.S.
- Resting place: Ashes buried in Valhalla Memorial Park Cemetery
- Other names: "Crying Jane"; C. R. Avery
- Occupations: Actress, playwright
- Years active: 1903–1950
- Spouse: Adolph Klauber (m. 1906; sep. 1930)

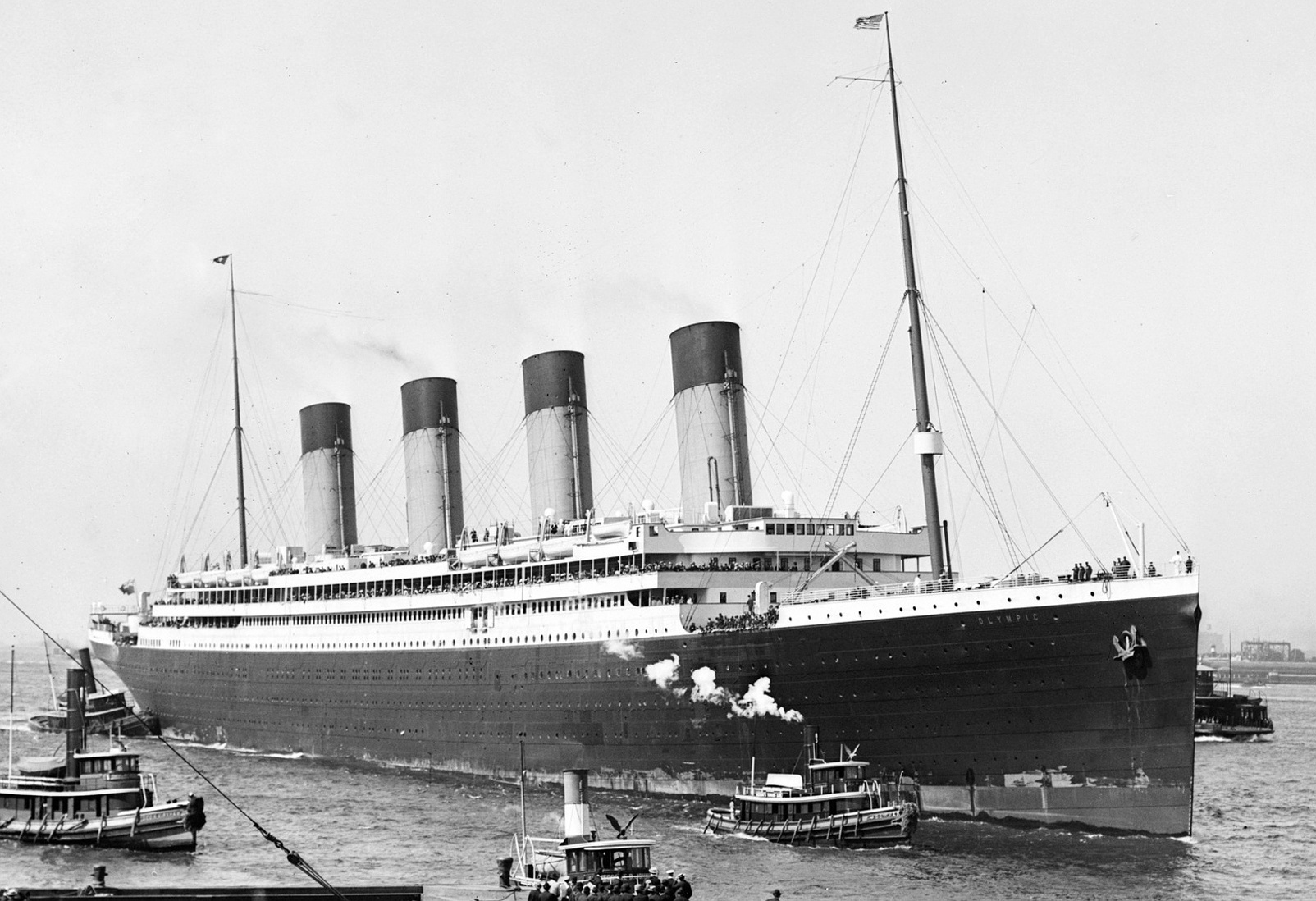
RMS Olympic June 1911 at New York, end of maiden voyage. Jane travelled from Southampton-to-New York for the maiden voyage.

Jane Cowl (December 14, 1883 – June 22, 1950) was an American film and stage actress and playwright who was, in the words of author Anthony Slide, "notorious for playing lachrymose parts". Actress Jane Russell was named in Cowl's honor.

== Biography ==
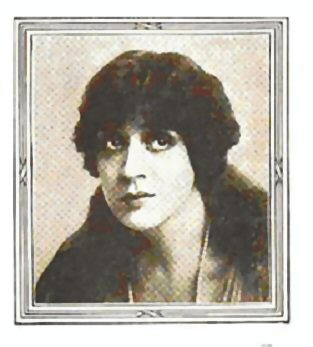
Photoplay: the Aristocrat of Motion Picture Magazines, Volume 9 1915

Cowl was born Jane Bailey in Boston, Massachusetts, to Charles Bailey and Grace Avery. She attended Erasmus Hall High School in Brooklyn, New York City, followed by some courses at Columbia University.

She made her Broadway debut in New York City in Sweet Kitty Bellairs in 1903. Her first leading role was Fanny Perry in 1909 in Leo Ditrichstein's Is Matrimony a Failure?, produced by David Belasco, and then she played stock. This was followed by The Gamblers (1910), her first great success, and by Within the Law (1912), Common Clay (1915), and other successes (New International Encyclopedia).

She was known for her interpretation of Shakespearean roles, playing Juliet, Cleopatra, and Viola on Broadway. She made history by giving 856 performances as Juliet beginning in December 1922, including 174 consecutive performances at the Henry Miller Theatre. Critic George Jean Nathan declared her "not ... the best Juliet that I have seen, but she is by all odds the most charming". Cowl's affecting performances led her to be described as having a "voice with a tear." Biographer Charles Higham admired Cowl's "marvelous bovine eyes and exquisite genteel catch in the voice ..."

In June 1911, Cowl traveled on the maiden voyage from Southampton of the RMS Olympic.

In 1930, Cowl appeared with a young Katharine Hepburn in the Broadway production of Benn W. Levy's play Art and Mrs. Bottle, and in 1934, she created the role of Lael Wyngate in S.N. Behrman's Rain from Heaven opposite actor John Halliday. Noting the challenges posed by Behrman's heightened dialogue, critic Gilbert Gabriel noted approvingly that their scenes together were "models of aristocratic parlando." She also starred in Noël Coward's Easy Virtue.

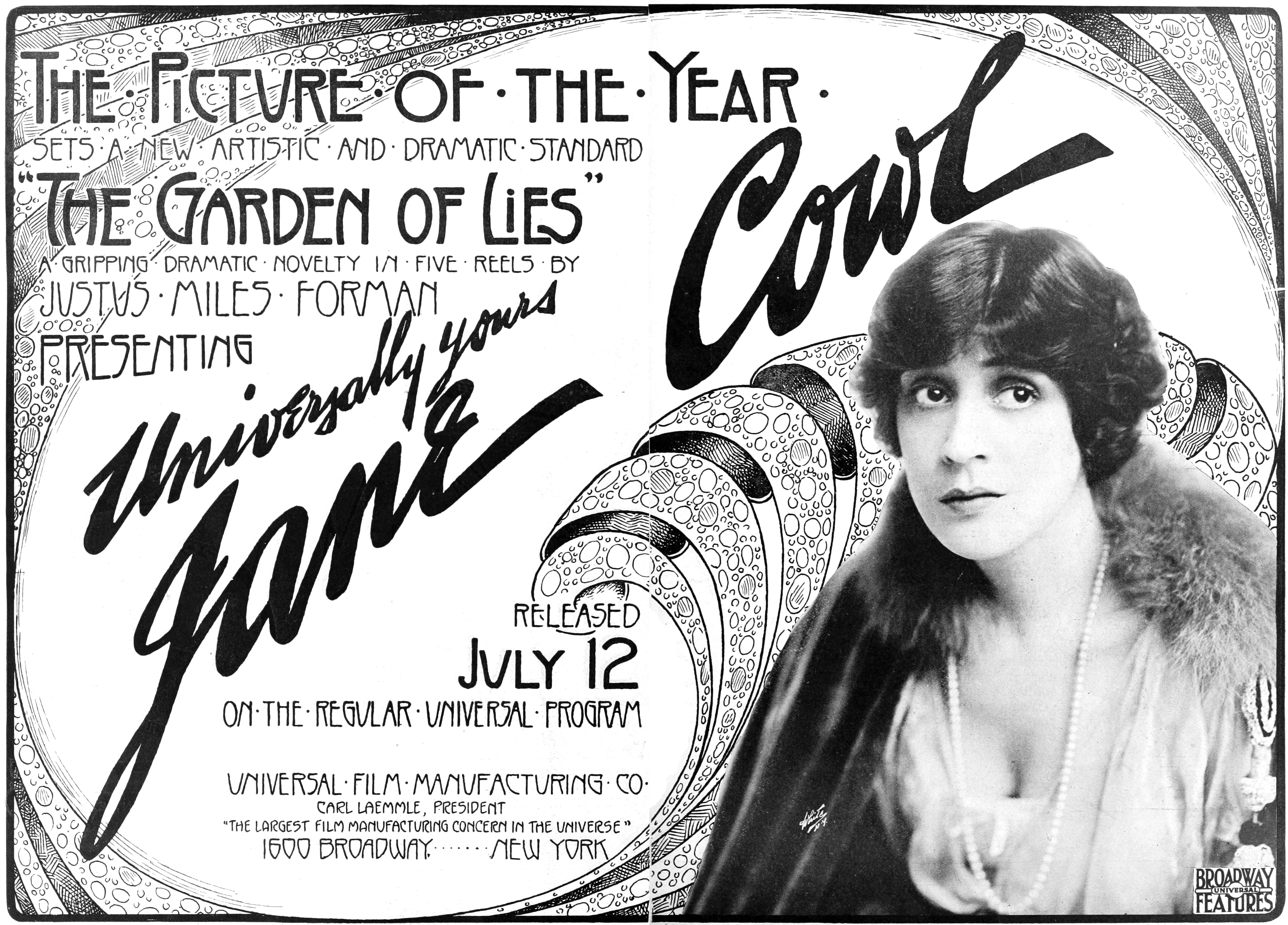
Advertisement for Jane Cowl in the 1915 Universal film The Garden of Lies

Cowl was the lead in two silent films, The Garden of Lies (1915) and The Spreading Dawn (1917). Then, after nearly 30 years away from films, she returned for several supporting roles in the 1940s. Her final film was Payment on Demand (1951) with Bette Davis.

Jane Cowl died of cancer in Santa Monica, California, on June 22, 1950, aged 66. Following cremation, her ashes were buried at Valhalla Memorial Park Cemetery.

A biography about Cowl, titled Jane Cowl: Her Precious and Momentary Glory, was published in 2004. It was written by Richard Abe King, who had formerly worked with Cowl.

== Family ==
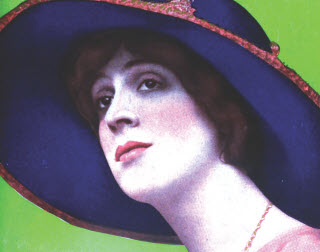
From the Green Book Magazine cover 1912

On June 18, 1906, at her father's apartment on Riverside Drive and 95th Street in New York City, Cowl married Adolph Edward Klauber, the drama critic of The New York Times. A former actor and son of a prominent Jewish photographer in Louisville, Kentucky, Klauber left the Times in 1918 to become a theatrical producer and manager. He and Cowl separated in 1930, shortly after his health began to fail. Klauber returned to live "in strict seclusion" in Louisville, where he died in 1933. The couple had no children.

== Works ==
Cowl wrote several plays in collaboration with Jane Murfin. They often used the joint pseudonym Allan Langdon Martin. Their works include:

- Lilac Time - 1917
- At Daybreak - 1917
- Information Please - 1918
- Smilin' Through - 1919
- The Jealous Moon - 1928

== Filmography ==
- The Garden of Lies (1915)
- The Spreading Dawn (1917)
- Once More, My Darling (1949)
- No Man of Her Own (1950)
- The Secret Fury (1950)
- Payment on Demand (1951)
