= Calvin Thomas (actor) =

American actor (1885–1964)

Calvin Louis Thomas (1885 – September 26, 1964) was an American stage, film and television actor, and a theatre director.

== Biography ==
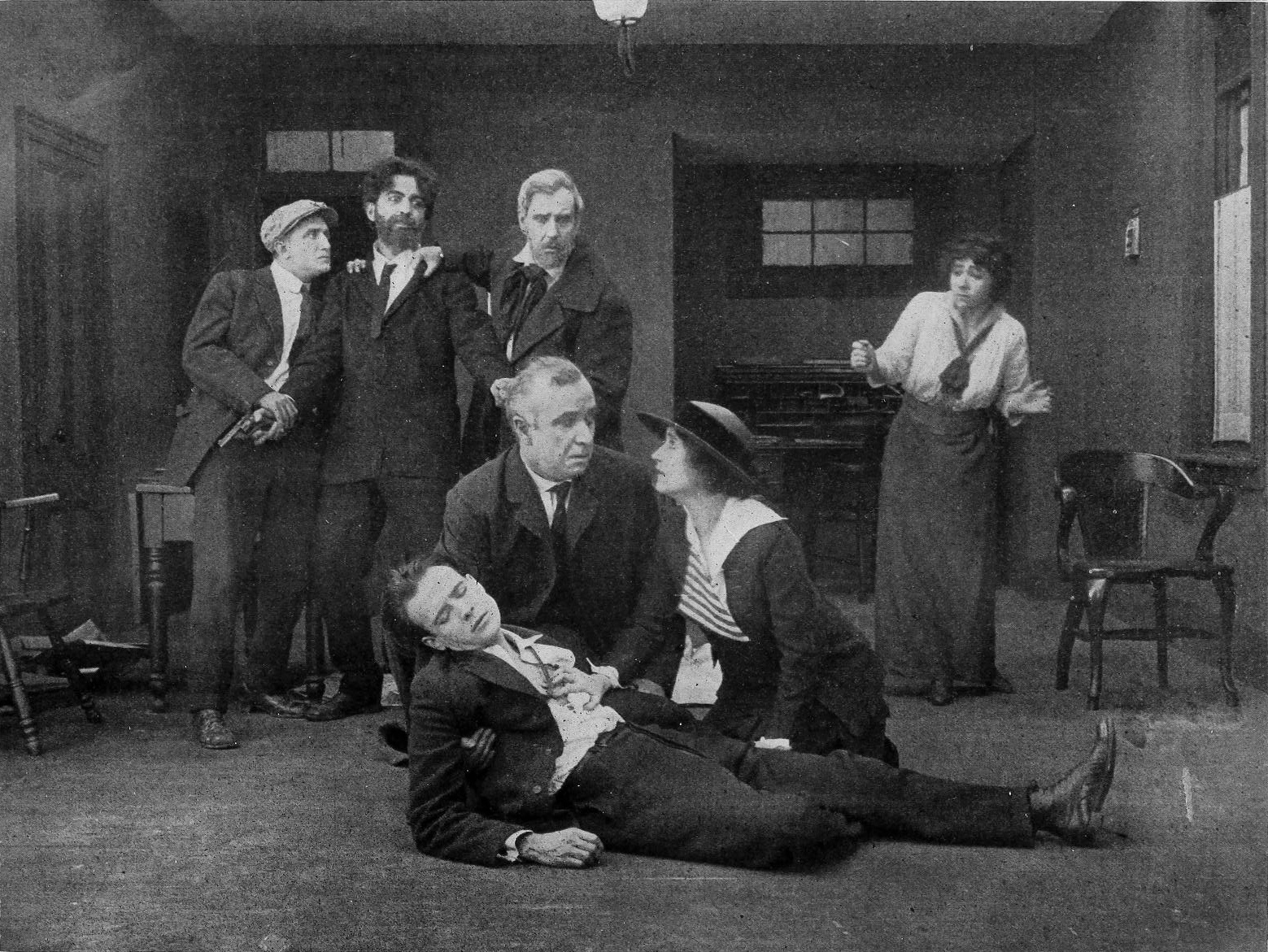
Scene from The Money Master (1915). Foreground includes Calvin Thomas (on the floor) with Frank Sheridan and Anne Meredith. In the background are Fania Marinoff, Paul McAllister (holding gun), Sam Reed, and Malcolm Duncan.

Born in Kansas City, Missouri, to Jesse and Virginia Thomas, he was the older brother of actor Frank M. Thomas. He began performing on Broadway in 1907 as Louis Thomas, making his debut as a bit player in Peer Gynt with Richard Mansfield in the starring role. Also in 1907 and again as Louis Thomas, he appeared as Servius in a production of Shakespeare's Julius Caesar at Broadway's New Amsterdam Theatre, with Robert Mantell as Marcus Brutus. He began performing as Calvin Thomas in 1912. Thomas made his film debut in 1915 in The Money Master, but performed mostly on the Broadway stage, appearing in nearly 40 plays and musicals. He appeared as the Starkeeper in the original Broadway production of Carousel and also had Broadway roles in Kiss and Tell, Abe Lincoln in Illinois, Show Girl, and We, the People. In 1927 he performed with Margaret Mosier in Junk, and they soon married; she died in 1951. His last Broadway role was as Dr. Ormondy in the 1955 production of Pipe Dream.

Thomas also appeared in several television series, including Hallmark Hall of Fame and, in its first (1955–56) season, The Honeymooners (in the episodes "'Twas the Night before Christmas," "Oh My Aching Back," and "The Safety Award."

== Personal life ==
Thomas died in Caldwell, New Jersey in 1964 at the age of 79. He was survived by his second wife, Delia, whom he married in 1954, and two sons by his first marriage.
