= The Little Red Schoolhouse =

1936 film by Charles Lamont

- Directed by: Charles Lamont
- Written by: Paul Perez
- Produced by: George R. Batcheller
- Starring: Frank Coghlan Jr.; Lloyd Hughes; Dickie Moore
- Cinematography: M.A. Anderson
- Edited by: Roland D. Reed
- Production company: Chesterfield Pictures
- Distributed by: Chesterfield Pictures
- Release date: March 2, 1936
- Running time: 60 minutes
- Country: United States
- Language: English

The Little Red Schoolhouse is a 1936 American drama film directed by Charles Lamont and starring Frank Coghlan Jr., Lloyd Hughes and Dickie Moore.

== Plot ==
A boy runs away from school and heads for New York City.

== Cast ==
- Frank Coghlan Jr. as Frank 'Frankie' Burke
- Lloyd Hughes as Owen Rogers
- Dickie Moore as Dickie Burke
- Ann Doran as Mary Burke
- Corky as Corky, Frankie's Dog
- Richard Carle as The Professor, a Hobo
- Ralf Harolde as Pete Scardoni
- Frank Sheridan as Warden Gail
- Matthew Betz as Bill, the Tough Hobo
- Kenneth Howell as Schuyler Tree
- Sidney Miller as Sidney Levy
- Gloria Browne as Shirley
- Don Brodie as Edward 'Ed', Pete's Henchman
- Lew Davis as Mac, Pete's Henchman
- Fred Kelsey as First Detective
- William Gould as Second Detective
- Broderick O'Farrell as Mr. Tree
- Lafe McKee as Watchman
- Robert McKenzie as Schultz, Grocery Proprietor
- Jack Shutta as Tramp
- William H. Strauss as Mr. Levy
- Muriel Kearney as Freckle-faced Kid

== Bibliography ==
- Michael R. Pitts. Poverty Row Studios, 1929-1940: An Illustrated History of 55 Independent Film Companies, with a Filmography for Each. McFarland & Company, 2005.
