= Cliff Hall (comedian) =

American actor (1894–1972)

- Born: October 4, 1894; Brooklyn, New York, U.S.
- Died: October 6, 1972 (aged 78); Englewood, New Jersey, U.S.
- Spouse: June Porges

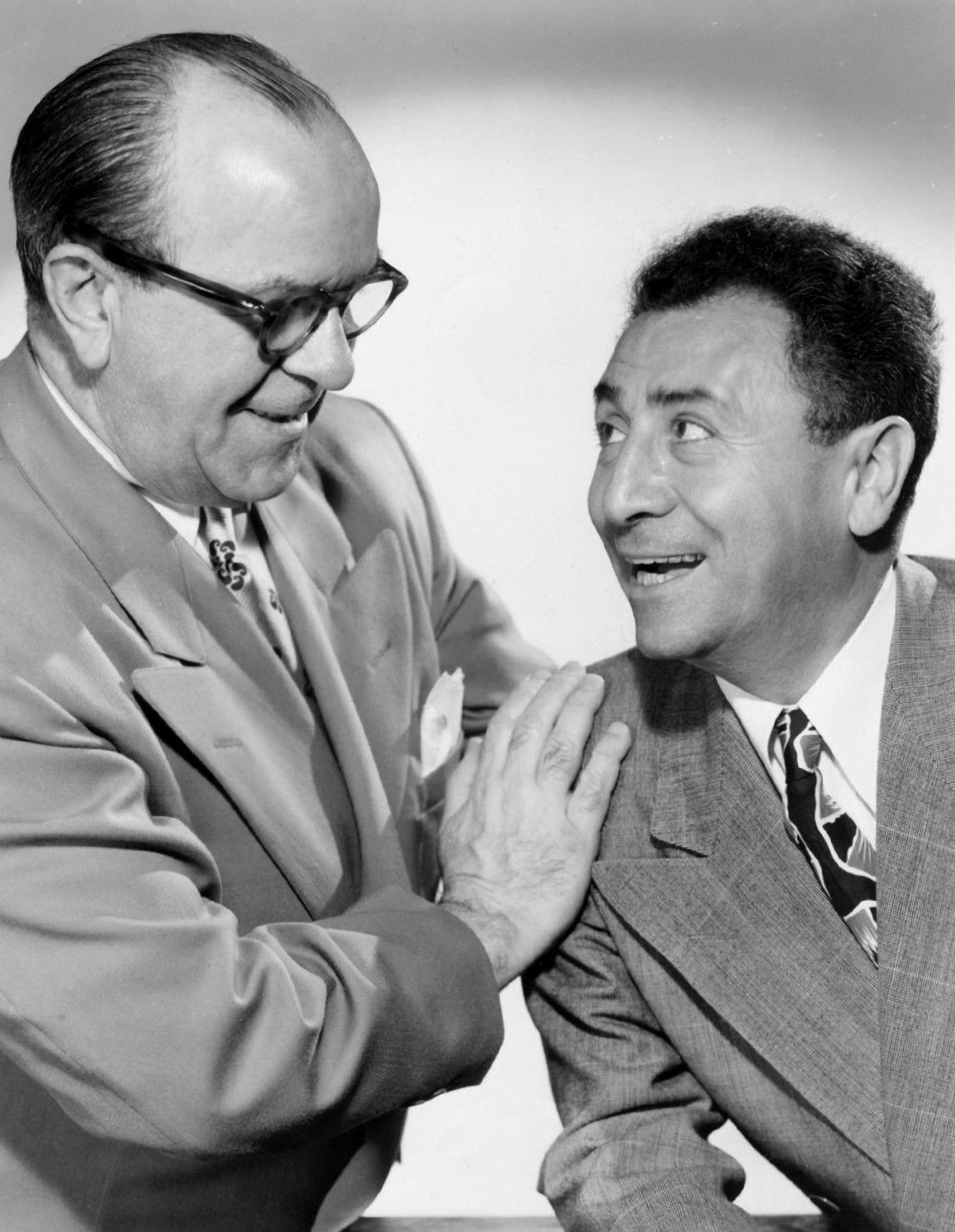
For radio, Jack Pearl (right) and Cliff Hall (left) played the Baron and his disbelieving foil Charlie, respectively.

Cliff Hall (October 4, 1894 – October 6, 1972) was an American stage and radio comedian, best known for being a straight man to Jack Pearl's Baron Munchausen character.

Born Robert Clifford Hall in Brooklyn, he first got on stage in 1910 as part of the Cecil Spooner Stock Company. He acted on stage, on radio, and on TV into the 1960s, until retiring in 1968. He worked with Pearl on radio for 15 years, but they also partnered on vaudeville and in commercials for close to 30 years.

Hall's Broadway credits include Ziegfeld Follies of 1931 (1931), Pardon My English (1933), Lord Pengo (1962), Here's Love (1963), and Sherry! (1967).His many TV appearances included playing the Raccoon Lodge President on The Honeymooners. One of his last TV appearances was in a 1966 episode of Bewitched (Season 2, "A Bum Raps"). In the early 1950s he was a regular on the TV soap opera Search for Tomorrow.

Hall also partnered as a straight man with others including Bert Lahr and Willie Howard.

Hall only had one eye, though that was not well-known, the result of an attack by a Canadian soldier on leave in 1942. Hall was in the Navy in World War I, and an entertainer for troops during World War II.

Hall married June Porges, a showgirl, in Baltimore in 1927. She sued for separation in 1931. He died on October 6, 1972, in Englewood, New Jersey.
