= The Honeymooners =

American television sitcom (1955–1956)

- Title card
- Genre: Sitcom
- Created by: Jackie Gleason
- Written by: Marvin Marx; Walter Stone; A.J. Russell; Herbert Finn; Leonard Stern; Sydney Zelinka
- Directed by: Frank Satenstein
- Starring: Jackie Gleason; Audrey Meadows; Art Carney; Joyce Randolph; Pert Kelton
- Theme music composer: Jackie Gleason; Bill Templeton
- Opening theme: "You're My Greatest Love"
- Ending theme: "You're My Greatest Love" (extended version)
- Composers: Sammy Spear, Jackie Gleason
- Country of origin: United States
- Original language: English
- No. of seasons: 1
- No. of episodes: 39 (list of episodes)

Production
- Executive producers: Jack Philbin; Stanley Poss
- Producer: Jack Hurdle
- Production locations: Adelphi Theatre, New York City, U.S.
- Cinematography: Daniel Cavelli; Doug Downs; Jack Etra
- Camera setup: Multi-camera
- Running time: 26–27 minutes
- Production companies: Jackie Gleason Enterprises; CBS Productions

Original release
- Network: CBS
- Release: October 1, 1955 – September 22, 1956

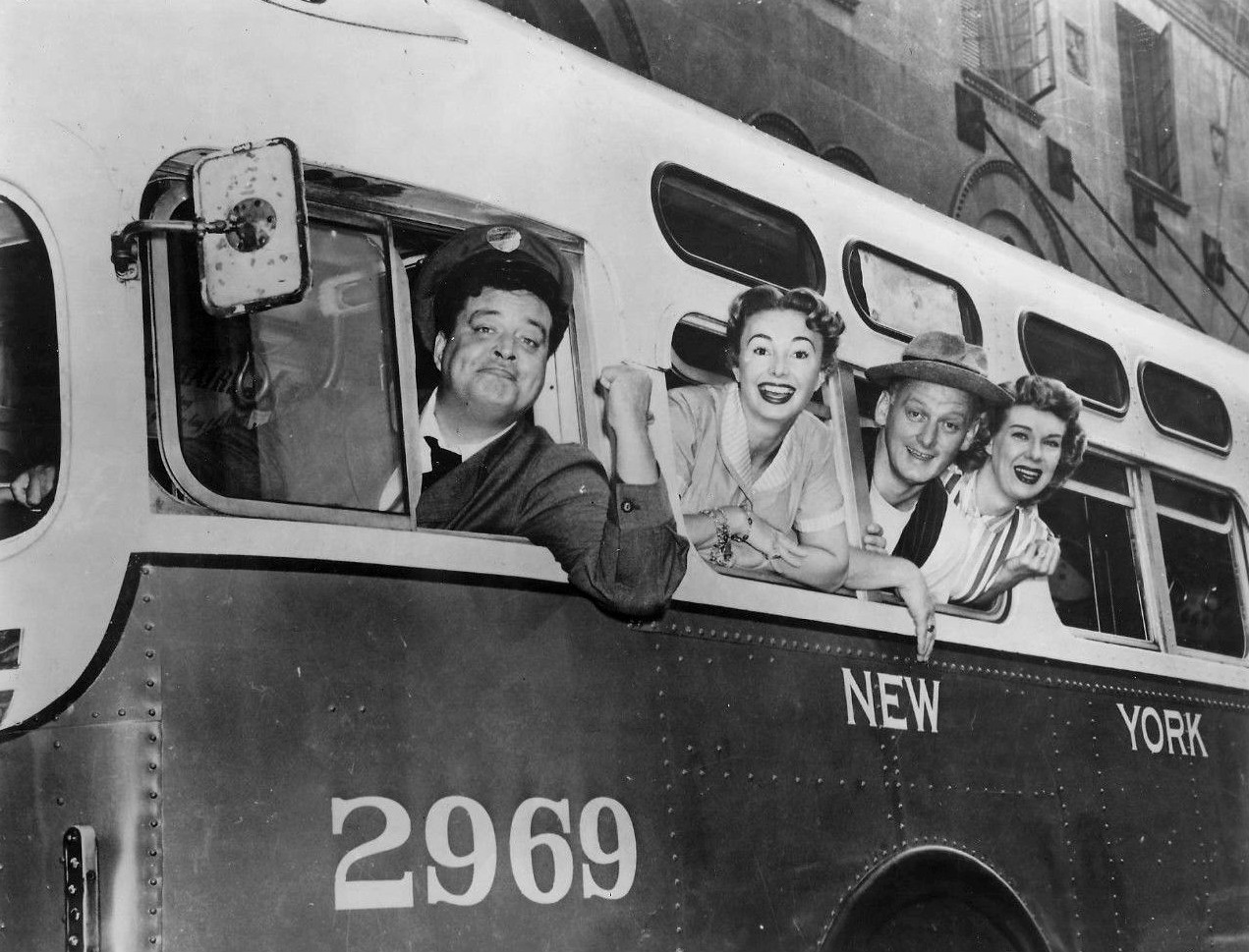
The show's cast in 1955 as it premiered on CBS: Jackie Gleason, Audrey Meadows, Art Carney and Joyce Randolph

The Honeymooners is an American television sitcom that originally aired from 1955 to 1956, created by and starring Jackie Gleason, and based on a recurring comedy sketch of the same name that had been part of Gleason's variety show. It follows the lives of New York City bus driver Ralph Kramden (Gleason), his wife Alice (Audrey Meadows), Ralph's best friend Ed Norton (Art Carney) and Ed's wife Trixie (Joyce Randolph) as they get involved with various schemes in their day-to-day living.

Most episodes revolve around Ralph's poor choices in absurd dilemmas that frequently show his judgmental attitude in a comedic tone. The show occasionally features more serious issues such as women's rights and social status.

The original comedy sketches first aired on the DuMont network's variety series Cavalcade of Stars, which Gleason hosted, and subsequently on the CBS network's The Jackie Gleason Show, which was broadcast live in front of a theater audience. The popularity of the sketches led Gleason to rework The Honeymooners as a filmed half-hour series, which debuted on CBS on October 1, 1955, replacing the variety series. It was initially a ratings success as the No. 2 show in the United States, facing stiff competition from The Perry Como Show on NBC. Gleason's show eventually dropped to No. 19, and production ended after 39 episodes (now referred to as the "Classic 39 episodes").

The final episode of The Honeymooners aired on September 22, 1956, and Gleason sporadically revived the characters until 1978. The Honeymooners was one of the first American television shows to portray working-class married couples in a gritty, non-idyllic manner, as the show is mostly set in the Kramdens' kitchen in a neglected Brooklyn apartment building. One of the sponsors of the show was Buick.

== Cast and characters ==
The majority of The Honeymooners episodes focus on four principal characters and generally use fixed sets within their Brooklyn apartment building. Although various secondary characters make multiple appearances, and occasional exterior shots are incorporated during editing, virtually all action and dialogue is "on stage" inside the normal backdrop.

=== Ralph Kramden ===
Played by Jackie Gleason, a bus driver for the fictional Gotham Bus Company based in New York City, he is never seen driving a bus (except in publicity photos), but sometimes is shown at the bus depot. Ralph is frustrated by his lack of success and often develops get-rich-quick schemes. He is short-tempered, frequently resorting to bellowing, insults, and hollow threats. The show's other characters have his weight as an easy target for the insults that they throw back at him. Well-hidden beneath the many layers of bluster, however, is a softhearted man who loves his wife and is devoted to his best friend, Ed Norton. Ralph enjoys bowling and playing pool; he is proficient at both and is an enthusiastic member of the Loyal Order of Raccoons (although in several episodes, a blackboard at the lodge lists his dues as being in arrears). Ralph's mother rarely is mentioned, although she appears in one episode. Ralph's father is mentioned in only one episode ("Young Man with a Horn") as having given Ralph a cornet he learned to play as a boy, and Ralph insists on keeping the cornet when Alice suggests it be thrown away.

The Ralph Kramden character was given honorary membership in the real New York City bus drivers' union (Local 100 of the Transport Workers Union) during the run of the show, and a Brooklyn bus depot was named in Gleason's honor after his death. Ralph Kramden was the inspiration for the animated character Fred Flintstone. An eight-foot-tall bronze statue of a jolly Jackie Gleason in a bus driver's uniform was erected in 1999 in front of Manhattan's midtown Port Authority Bus Terminal. TV Land funded the statue in cooperation with Gleason's estate and the Port Authority. Also in 1999, Ralph was ranked #13 on TV Guide's list of the 50 greatest TV characters.

=== Alice Kramden ===
Alice (née Alice Gibson), played in the first nine skits from 1951 to January 1952 by Pert Kelton, by Audrey Meadows until 1956, then by Sheila MacRae, is Ralph's patient but sharp-tongued wife of 14 years. She often finds herself bearing the brunt of Ralph's tantrums and demands, which she returns with biting sarcasm. She is levelheaded, in contrast to Ralph's pattern of inventing various schemes to enhance his wealth or his pride. She sees his schemes' unworkability, but he becomes angry and ignores her advice (and by the end of the episode, her misgivings almost always prove correct). Upon discovering the failures of his schemes and subsequent cover-ups, she demands to Ralph: "Oh, how I wish you had an explanation for that." Alice runs the finances of the Kramden household, and Ralph frequently has to beg her for money to pay for his lodge dues or crazy schemes. Alice studied to be a secretary before her marriage and works briefly in that capacity when Ralph is laid off. Wilma Flintstone is based on Alice Kramden.

Another foil for Ralph is Alice's mother, who is even sharper-tongued than her daughter and despises Ralph as a bad provider. Alice's father is occasionally mentioned, but never seen. Alice's sister Agnes appears in episode 22, "Here Comes the Bride". (Ralph jeopardizes his newlywed sister-in-law's marriage after giving some bad advice to the groom, but it all works out in the end). Ralph and Alice lived with her mother for six years after getting married before they got their own apartment. In a 1967 revival, Ralph refers to Alice (played by MacRae in 1966–70 and once more in 1973) as being one of 12 children, and to her father as never working.

The Honeymooners originally appeared as a sketch on the DuMont Network's Cavalcade of Stars, with the role of Alice played by Pert Kelton (1907–1968). When his contract with DuMont expired, Gleason moved to the CBS network where he had The Jackie Gleason Show, and the role of Alice went to Audrey Meadows because Kelton had been blacklisted. According to playwright Arthur Miller, a family friend, writing many years later in his autobiography Timebends: A Life, extensive inquiries finally revealed that her blacklisting was due to the fact that her husband Ralph had, many years earlier, marched in a May Day parade. "Ralph, I knew, had absolutely no leftist connections whatever but had simply thrown himself in with a gang of actors protesting whatever it was that year, and Pert had never even voted in her life."

The character's name is mentioned in the 1998 American stoner comedy film Half Baked in the lyrics to the song by the movie's character "Sir Smoka-Alot".

=== Edward Lillywhite/Ethelbert "Ed" Norton ===
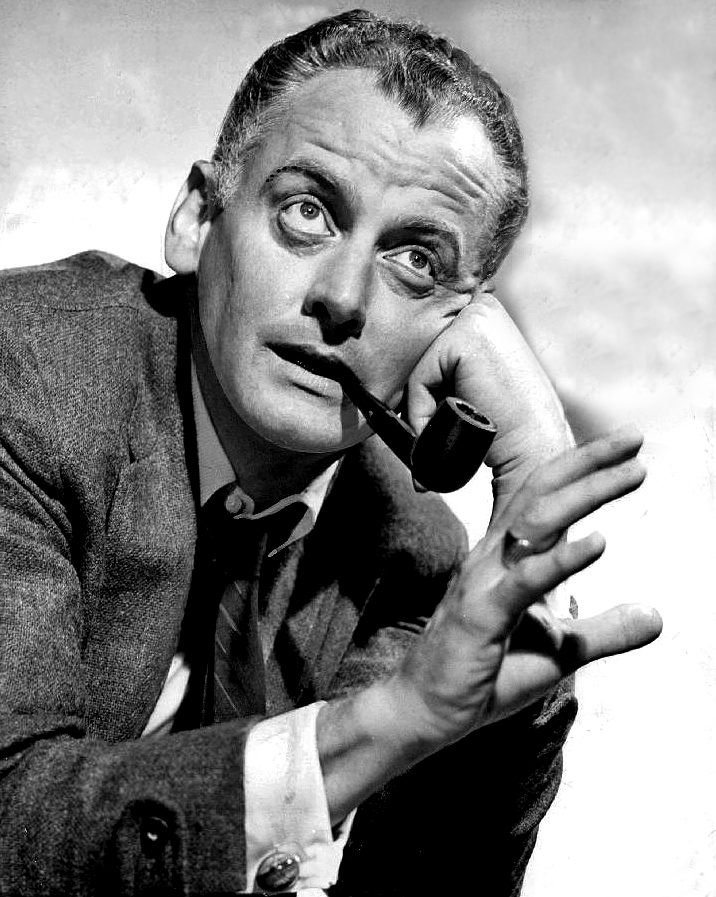
Actor Art Carney won numerous awards for his portrayal of Ed Norton

Played by Art Carney; a New York City municipal sewer worker and Ralph's best friend (and upstairs neighbor). He is considerably more good-natured than Ralph, but nonetheless trades insults with him on a regular basis. Ed (typically called "Norton" by Ralph and sometimes by his own wife, Trixie) often gets mixed up in Ralph's schemes. His carefree and rather dimwitted nature usually results in raising Ralph's ire, while Ralph often showers him with verbal abuse and throws him out of the apartment when Ed irritates him. In most episodes, Ed is shown to be better-read, better-liked, more worldly and more even-tempered than Ralph, despite his unassuming manner and the fact that he usually lets Ralph take the lead in their escapades. Ed and Ralph both are members of the fictional Raccoon Lodge. Like Ralph, Ed enjoys and is good at bowling and playing pool. Unlike Ralph, Ed is good at ping-pong.

Ed worked for the New York City sewer department, and described his job as a "Sub-supervisor in the sub-division of the department of subterranean sanitation, I just keep things moving along." He served in the U.S. Navy in World War II, and used his G.I. Bill money to pay for typing school, but felt he was unable to work in an office because he hated working in confined spaces. The relatively few scenes set in the Norton apartment showed it to have the same layout as the Kramdens' but more nicely furnished. Though Norton makes the same weekly $62 salary as Ralph (roughly $750 in 2025 dollars), their higher standard of living might be explained by Norton's freer use of credit; at one point he admits to having 19 charge accounts.

Ed is the inspiration for Barney Rubble in The Flintstones, and for Yogi Bear (in terms of design, clothing, and mannerisms). In 1999, TV Guide ranked him 2nd on its list of the "50 Greatest TV Characters of All Time". According to Entertainment Weekly, Norton is ranked 8th of the "greatest sidekicks ever".

=== Thelma "Trixie" Norton ===
Thelma "Trixie" Norton was Ed's wife and Alice's best friend. She did not appear in every episode and had a less developed character, though she is shown to be somewhat bossy toward her husband. In one episode, she surprisingly is depicted as a pool hustler. Trixie is the inspiration for Betty Rubble in The Flintstones.

Elaine Stritch was the first and original Trixie Norton in a Honeymooners sketch ("The New Television") with Gleason, Carney, and Pert Kelton. Trixie's abrasive ex-burlesque-dancer character was rewritten and recast by Gleason after just one episode, with Joyce Randolph playing the character as a wholesome housewife.

Joyce Randolph played the role in earlier sketches and on the 1955–1956 sitcom The Honeymooners.

Jane Kean played the role in a series of hour-long Honeymooners episodes, in color and with music, on The Jackie Gleason Show from 1966 to 1970, playing the role for many more years than her predecessor.

=== Others ===
Some of the actors who appeared multiple times on the show include George O. Petrie and Frank Marth as various characters, Ethel Owen as Alice's mother, Zamah Cunningham as apartment building neighbor Mrs. Manicotti, and Cliff Hall as the Raccoon Lodge president.

Ronnie Burns, son of George Burns and Gracie Allen, made a guest appearance on one episode. On another episode, Norton makes a reference to a co-worker "Nat Birnbaum" (as in "'nat', a three-letter word for bug", says crossword puzzle aficionado Norton). George Burns's real name was Nathan Birnbaum. Seasoned actress Eileen Heckart appeared as Alice's mother in the 1978 The Honeymooners Christmas special (who was in reality just three years older than her "daughter", Alice). Strangely, Heckart's character makes several comments in the episode alluding to her desire to become a grandmother by Ralph and Alice, this despite the fact that Meadows, who played Alice, was in fact 55 years old at that time.

=== The apartment house ===
The Kramdens and Nortons lived in an apartment house at 328 Chauncey Street in Brooklyn, New York City, in an area known as "Bushwick" – a nod to the fact that Jackie Gleason lived there after his family moved from his birthplace at 364 Chauncey Street. In the 1955 episode "A Woman's Work is Never Done", the address is referred to as 728 Chauncey Street. The landlord of the apartment house is Mr. Johnson. In The Honeymooners episodes taped from 1967 to 1970, the address of the apartment house changed to 358 Chauncey Street, and the number of the Kramden apartment is 3B. The actual 328 Chauncey Street is located in the Stuyvesant Heights section of the borough, approximately eight miles northeast of the show's fictional location.

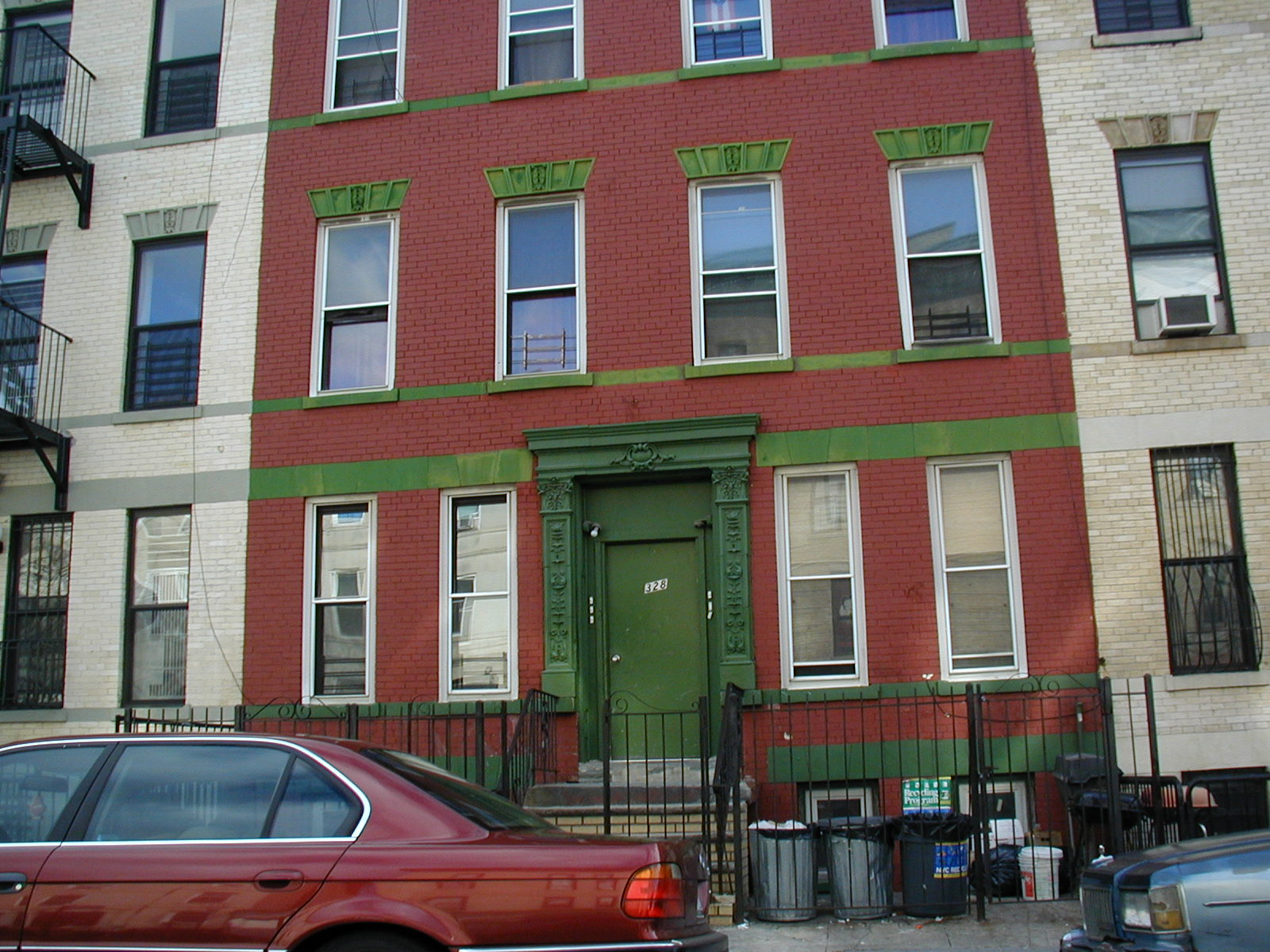
The real 328 Chauncey Street

=== Apartment residents ===
- Mr. and Mrs. Manicotti: An older couple of Italian descent.
- Tyler: Older gentleman who lives on the same floor, who knocks out Ralph's fighter - “Dynamite” for waking him up while he [Dynamite] works out on the punching / speed bag.
- Tommy Manicotti: He played stickball and contracted the measles. He also left his water pistol in the Kramdens' apartment.
- Garrity: A vocal upstairs neighbor with whom Ralph frequently feuds. He fought with Ralph for disturbing the neighbors with practicing for The $99,000 Answer quiz show. But showing some humor in other episodes, he accused Ralph of renting the tuxedo for his sister-in-law's wedding from an undertaker, and loved Ralph's joke about "sending a knight out on a dog like this."
- Garrity Boy: He played stickball and contracted the measles.
- Mrs. Bennett: Needed her radiator fixed when Ralph was the janitor.
- Johnny Bennett: He played stickball, earned an apple for a home-run—and contracted the measles like the other boys.
- Mrs. Doyle: Mother of Tommy Doyle.
- Tommy Doyle: He was arrested for spending a $100 counterfeit bill that Ralph gave him to take his suits to the cleaners.
- Mrs. Stevens: She gave Alice a box for hairpins that was made of matchsticks for Christmas which was the same exact gift Ralph was about to give her but he vastly overpaid for it and thought he had a great gift rather than an insignificant trinket for Alice. Alice gave Mrs. Stevens a kitchen thermometer.
- Mrs. Olsen: She said that Ralph broke her Venetian blinds instead of repairing them when Ralph temporarily was the building janitor.
- Mrs. Hannah: Needed her bathtub fixed when Ralph was the janitor.
- Mrs. Fogerty: Accused Ralph of taking food out of her ice box when Ralph was the janitor.
- Mrs. Schwartz: The apartment house blabbermouth who reported that the Kramdens had set the all-time lowest gas bill for the building. She also was curious to know if the house phone was able to connect to New Jersey when Ralph was the janitor.
- Mr. Riley: Had a full garbage can that needed to be emptied when Ralph was the janitor.
- Judy Connors: A teenager who did not want her father to meet a boy named Wallace, her date.
- Tommy Mullins: A U.S. Navy service member who was home on leave for Christmas.
- Carlos Sanchez: A mambo dancer who works at night.
- Mr. and Mrs. August Gunther: Former residents of the building. August hit it big with his doughnut business.
- Mr. Johnson: The building's landlord.

== Plot ==
Most of The Honeymooners takes place in Ralph and Alice Kramden's small, sparsely furnished two-room apartment. Other settings used in the show included the Gotham Bus Company depot, the Raccoon Lodge, a neighborhood pool parlor, a park bench where Ralph and Ed occasionally meet for lunch, and on occasion the Nortons' apartment (always noticeably better-furnished than the Kramdens'). Many episodes begin with a shot of Alice in the apartment awaiting Ralph's arrival from work. Most episodes focus on Ralph's and Ed's characters, although Alice played a substantial role. Trixie played a smaller role in the series, and did not appear in every episode as did the other three. Each episode presented a self-contained story, which rarely carried over into a subsequent one. The show employed a number of standard sitcom clichés and plots, particularly those of jealousy, get-rich-quick schemes, and comic misunderstanding.

As to the occasional plot continuations, there were two such sequences — one concerning Ralph being sent to a psychiatrist because of "impatient" behavior during work that resulted in several passengers lodging complaints about his professional demeanor, and one that continued for two sequential shows in which Aunt Ethel visited and Ralph hatched a scheme to marry her off to the neighborhood butcher.

The series presents Ralph as an everyman and an underdog who struggles to make a better life for himself and his wife, but who ultimately fails due to his own shortcomings. He, often along with Ed, devises a number of get-rich-quick schemes, none of which succeed. Ralph would be quick to blame others for his misfortune until it was pointed out to him where he had fallen short. Ralph's anger then would be replaced by short-lived remorse, and he would apologize for his actions. Many of these apologies to Alice ended with Ralph saying in a heartfelt manner, "Baby, you're the greatest," followed by a hug and kiss.

In most episodes, Ralph's short temper got the best of him, leading him to yell at others and to threaten comical physical violence, usually against Alice. Ralph's favorite threats to her were "One of these days ... One of these days ... Pow! right in the kisser!" or to knock her "to the Moon, Alice!" (Sometimes this last threat was simply abbreviated: as "Bang, zoom!") On other occasions, Ralph simply told Alice, "Oh, are you gonna get yours." All of this led to criticism, more than 40 years later, that the show displayed an ironic acceptance of domestic violence. But Ralph never carried out his threats, and others have pointed out that Alice knew he never would because of their deep love for each other — indeed, Alice never was seen to back down during any of Ralph's tirades. In retaliation, the targets of Ralph's verbal abuse often responded by simply joking about his weight, a common theme throughout the series.

For the "Classic 39" episodes of The Honeymooners, there was no continuing story arc. Each episode is self-contained. For example, in the series premiere episode "TV or Not TV", Ralph and Norton buy a television set with the intent to share it. By the next week's show, the set is gone although in later episodes a set is shown in the Nortons' apartment. In the installment "The Baby Sitter", the Kramdens get a telephone, but in the next episode, it is gone. And, in the episode, "A Dog's Life", Alice gets a dog from the pound which Ralph tries to return. But, in the end, Ralph finds himself growing to love the dog and decides to keep it along with a few other dogs. However, in the next episode, the dogs are nowhere to be seen and are never referred to again.

Occasionally, references to earlier episodes were made, including to Ralph's various "crazy harebrained schemes" from the lost episodes. Norton's sleepwalking in "The Sleepwalker" was referenced in "Oh My Aching Back", but it was not until the 1967 "Trip To Europe" shows that a Honeymooners story arc is finally used.

== History ==
=== Origins ===
In July 1950, Jackie Gleason became the host of Cavalcade of Stars, a variety show that aired on the struggling DuMont Television Network. After the first year, he and his writers Harry Crane and Joe Bigelow developed a sketch that drew upon familiar domestic situations for its material. Based on the popular radio show The Bickersons, Gleason wanted a realistic portrayal of life for a poor husband and wife living in Brooklyn, his home borough. The couple would continually argue but ultimately show their love for each other. After rejecting titles such as "The Beast", "The Lovers" and "The Couple Next Door", Gleason and his staff settled on "The Honeymooners". Gleason took the role of Ralph Kramden, a blustery bus driver, and he chose veteran comedy film actress Pert Kelton for the role of Alice Kramden, Ralph's acerbic and long-suffering wife.

"The Honeymooners" debuted on October 5, 1951, as a six-minute sketch. Ensemble cast member Art Carney made a brief appearance as a police officer who is hit with flour that Ralph throws from the window. The tone of these early sketches was much darker than that of the later series, with Ralph exhibiting great bitterness and frustration with his marriage to an equally bitter and argumentative middle-aged woman (Kelton was nine years older than was Gleason). The Kramdens' financial struggles mirrored those of Gleason's early life in Brooklyn, and he took great pains to model the set on his memory of the apartment where he had lived. The Kramdens—and later the Nortons when those characters were added—are childless, an issue only occasionally explored, but a condition upon which Gleason insisted. Ralph and Alice did legally adopt a baby girl whom they named Ralphina. However, the biological mother requested to have her baby returned. A few later sketches had Ralph mistakenly believe that Alice was pregnant. A running theme on the series was Alice's longing to have a dog but Ralph refusing, a metaphor over the couple's dispute about having children (the ideas were picked up in the Flintstones).

Early cast additions in later sketches were upstairs neighbors Ed and Trixie Norton. Ed was a sewer worker and Ralph's best friend, although his innocent and guileless nature was the source of many arguments between the two men. Trixie (maiden name never mentioned), Ed's wife, was originally portrayed by Elaine Stritch as a burlesque dancer, but was replaced after just one appearance by the more wholesome-looking Joyce Randolph. Trixie is a foil to Ed, just as Alice is to Ralph, but often offscreen.

With the colorful array of characters whom Gleason had invented, including the cast of "The Honeymooners" sketches, Cavalcade of Stars became a great success for DuMont and increased its audience share from 9% to 25%. Gleason's contract with DuMont expired in the summer of 1952, and the financially struggling network (which suffered through ten rounds of layoffs from July through October 1953) was unable to retain him, and he moved to CBS.

=== Move to CBS ===
In July 1952, CBS president William S. Paley sent Gleason and his cast on a highly successful nationwide five-week promotional tour, performing musical numbers and sketches (including the popular "The Honeymooners"). However, Kelton, who played Alice Kramden and other roles, was blacklisted and replaced on the tour by Beulah actress Ginger Jones, who also became blacklisted (having earlier been named on the Red Channels blacklist) by CBS. As a result, yet another Alice was needed.

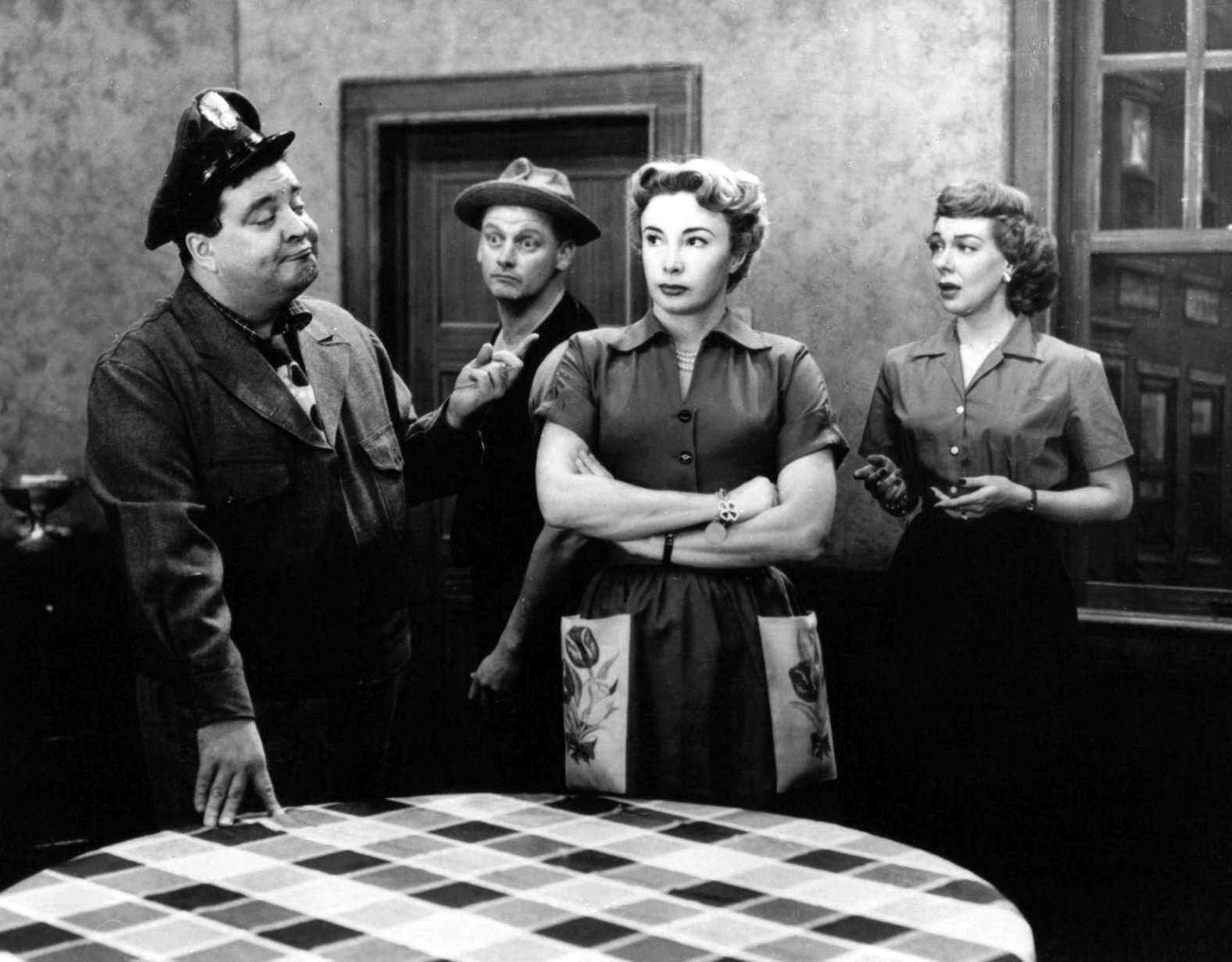
Ralph Kramden (Jackie Gleason) with Ed Norton (Art Carney), Alice Kramden (Audrey Meadows) and Trixie Norton (Joyce Randolph) in a Honeymooners scene.

Jones's replacement was Audrey Meadows, known for her work in the 1951 Broadway musical Top Banana and on the Bob & Ray television show. However, Gleason was concerned that Meadows was too attractive to make a credible Alice. To convince him, Meadows hired a photographer to take pictures of her in the early morning with no makeup, clad in a torn housecoat and with her hair undone. When Gleason saw the photos, he said, "That's our Alice." When he learned that it was Meadows in the photos, he reportedly said, "Any dame who has a sense of humor like that deserves the job." The lineup of Gleason, Carney, Meadows and Randolph was now in place.

The increasingly popular "The Honeymooners" sketches were prominent in episodes of The Jackie Gleason Show variety show. During the first season, they appeared on a regular basis (although not weekly) as a series of short sketches ranging in length from seven to thirteen minutes. For the 1953–54 season, the shorter sketches were outnumbered by ones that ran for 30 minutes or longer. During the 1954–55 season, most episodes of The Jackie Gleason Show consisted entirely of "The Honeymooners". Fan response became overwhelming, and Meadows received hundreds of curtains and aprons in the mail from fans who wanted to help Alice lead a fancier life. By January 1955, The Jackie Gleason Show was competing with—and sometimes beating—I Love Lucy as the most-watched television show in the United States. Audience members would queue around the block hours in advance in order to attend the show.

=== The "Classic 39" episodes ===
The "Classic 39" episodes of The Honeymooners are those that originally aired as a weekly half-hour sitcom on CBS from October 1955 to September 1956.

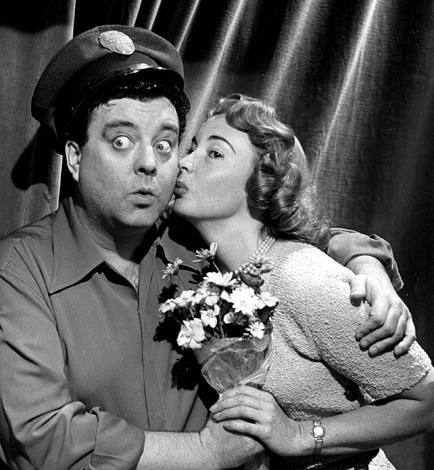
Gleason and Meadows as Ralph and Alice, 1955

Before Gleason's initial three-year contract with CBS expired, he was offered a much larger contract by CBS and General Motors' Buick division. The three-year contract, reportedly valued at $11 million (about $132 million now), was one of the largest in showbusiness history at the time. It called for Gleason to produce 78 filmed episodes of The Honeymooners over two seasons, with an option for a third season of 39 more. He was scheduled to receive $65,000 for each episode ($779,000 now) and $70,000 per episode in the second season ($839,000 now), but he had to pay all production costs out of that amount. Art Carney received $3,500 per week ($42,000 now), Audrey Meadows $2,000 ($24,000 now), and Joyce Randolph (who did not appear in every episode) $500 per week ($6,000 now). Production was handled by Jackie Gleason Enterprises Inc., which also produced Stage Show, a program that aired directly before episodes of The Honeymooners and starred the Dorsey Brothers. Meadows, who later became a banker, was reportedly the only cast member to receive residuals when the "Classic 39" episodes were rebroadcast in syndication because her brother Edward, a lawyer, had inserted language to that effect into her contract. Randolph received royalty payments when the "lost" Honeymooners episodes from the variety shows were released.

The first episode of the new half-hour series aired on Saturday, October 1, 1955, at 8:30 p.m. Eastern Time opposite Ozark Jubilee on ABC and The Perry Como Show on NBC. Because the show was sponsored by Buick, the opening credits originally ended with a sponsor identification by announcer Jack Lescoulie ("Brought to you by your Buick dealer. And away we go!"), and the show concluded with a brief Gleason sales pitch for the company, all common practices at the time. All references to Buick were removed when the show entered syndication in 1957, although Gleason frequently said "And away we go!" frequently in various shows, and the quote is inscribed on his gravestone.

The initial critical reaction to the half-hour sitcom Honeymooners was mixed. The New York Times and Broadcasting & Telecasting Magazine wrote that it was "labored" and lacked the spontaneity of the live sketches. But TV Guide praised it as "rollicking", "slapsticky" and "fast-paced". In February 1956, the show was moved to the 8:00 p.m. ET timeslot, but it already had begun losing viewers to the hugely popular Perry Como Show. Gleason's writers also had begun to feel confined by the restrictive half-hour format—in previous seasons, "The Honeymooners" sketches typically ran 35 minutes or more—and Gleason felt that were beginning to exhaust original ideas. After just one season, Gleason and CBS agreed to cancel The Honeymooners, which aired its 39th and final original episode on September 22, 1956. In explaining his decision to end the show with $7 million remaining on his contract, Gleason said, "The excellence of the material could not be maintained, and I had too much fondness for the show to cheapen it." Gleason subsequently sold the films of the "Classic 39" episodes of the show to CBS for $1.5 million.

== Production ==
The Honeymooners was filmed using three Electronicams.

In 1955, many television shows (including The Jackie Gleason Show) were performed live and recorded using kinescope technology, although many sitcoms were recorded on film, such as Amos 'n' Andy, The Adventures of Ozzie and Harriet, My Little Margie and I Married Joan. I Love Lucy, which was recorded directly onto 35mm film, had influenced television production companies to produce directly on film. For The Honeymooners, Gleason utilized the Electronicam TV film system, developed by DuMont in the early 1950s, which allowed for a live performance to be directly captured on film. As a result of the superior picture and sound quality afforded by the system, episodes of The Honeymooners were much more suitable for rebroadcast than were most other live shows of the era.

All 39 episodes of The Honeymooners were filmed at the DuMont Television Network's Adelphi Theatre at 152 West 54th Street in Manhattan before an audience of 1,000. Episodes were never fully rehearsed because Gleason felt that rehearsals would rob the show of its spontaneity. As a result, mistakes often were made, with lines recited incorrectly or altogether forgotten, and actors did not always follow the scripted action directions. To compensate, the cast developed visual cues for each other. For example, Gleason patted his stomach when he forgot a line, while Meadows would glance at the icebox when someone else was supposed to retrieve something from it.

In contrast to other popular comedies of the era (such as Father Knows Best, Leave It to Beaver and The Adventures of Ozzie and Harriet), which depicted their characters in comfortable, middle-class suburban environments, Richard Rychtarik's set design for The Honeymooners reflected the blue-collar existence of its characters. The Kramdens lived in a small, sparsely furnished two-room apartment in a tenement building at least four stories high (the Kramdens lived on the third floor and the Nortons lived one floor above them). They used the single main room as the kitchen, dining and living room. It consisted of a table and chairs, a chest of drawers, a curtainless window with a painted backdrop view of a fire escape and adjoining tenements, a noisy sink and an outdated icebox. The Kramdens' bedroom never was seen. One of the few other sitcoms about a blue-collar family was The Life of Riley, a show that featured Gleason in its first season (1949–50).

The instrumental theme song for The Honeymooners, titled "You're My Greatest Love", was composed by Gleason and performed by an orchestra led by Ray Bloch, previously the orchestra leader for Gleason's variety show as well as for The Ed Sullivan Show. Although lyrics were composed, they were never sung. Sammy Spear, who later became Gleason's musical director, provided the arrangement. The music heard in the episodes was not performed during the show, so to enhance the feeling of a live performance for the studio audience, an orchestra performed before filming and during breaks. The show's original announcer was Jack Lescoulie, who also was a spokesman for the sponsor, Buick. For the unsponsored syndicated version, the introduction was voiced by CBS staff announcer Gaylord Avery.

== Revivals ==
On September 29, 1956, one week after The Honeymooners ended as a weekly 30-minute series, The Jackie Gleason Show returned. "The Honeymooners" returned as part of the revived variety show. Eight episodes were produced as original full hour "Honeymooners" musicals with music and lyrics by Lyn Duddy and Jerry Bresler. The stories featured the Kramdens and Nortons touring Europe after winning a contest. Live musicals had become popular on live television following the success of the 1954-1955 live broadcasts of Mary Martin in Peter Pan as well as that of several Max Leibman original musicals. Including the musical episodes, a total of 20 skits of various lengths were performed that season, including restaging of several older skits. (One episode, featuring a remake of "Six Months of Live" is still missing.)

In 1959, TV Guide magazine mentioned Gleason's interest in producing new Honeymooners shows. This did not happen for several years, but Gleason did team with Carney to revive an old Honeymooners scene for an October 1960 CBS special titled The Big Sell.

After the spectacular failure of Gleason's 1961 game show You're in the Picture and the relative success of the eight-episode talk show that Gleason used to fill its time slot, his variety show returned in 1962 under the title Jackie Gleason and His American Scene Magazine. The "Honeymooners" sketches returned as part of the show whenever Carney was available. However, Meadows and Randolph were replaced by Sue Ane Langdon and Patricia Wilson for two sketches.

In January 1966, Meadows returned on Gleason's American Scene Magazine variety series as Alice for "The Honeymooners: The Adoption", a reenactment of a 1955 non-musical sketch of the same name, with original songs added by Duddy and Bresler.

When The Jackie Gleason Show, by then based at Gleason's relocated headquarters in Miami Beach, Florida, returned in 1966, the "Honeymooners" sketches, in color for the first time, featured Sheila MacRae and Jane Kean in the roles of Alice and Trixie, as Meadows and Randolph declined to relocate to Miami. Gleason did not object to recasting the roles of the wives but was adamant that the Ed Norton role should never be played by anyone other than Carney.

The 1966 videotaped "Honeymooners" were also musical episodes that comprised 18 of the first season's 32 shows. Most of these were updated remakes of 1956-57 musical episodes with songs by Duddy and Bresler, expanded with new material. This include an addition episode added to the "Trip To Europe" sketches. Ten of these programs were syndicated for local stations as The Honeymooners Go to Europe and the 1966-1970 color hour shows were released on DVD as The Color Honeymooners.

One notable 1967 segment featured the return of Pert Kelton (in one of her last performances before her death in 1968), but as Alice's mother.

"The Honeymooners" ended again when CBS announced the cancellation of The Jackie Gleason Show on February 16, 1970, the result of a disagreement in direction between Gleason and the network. Gleason wanted to continue interspersing "The Honeymooners" within his regular variety show, while CBS wanted a full-hour "Honeymooners" every week. CBS's ongoing effort to move its product toward younger audiences and away from established variety show stars was another potential factor in the show's demise. On October 11, 1973, Gleason, Carney, MacRae and Kean reunited for a "Honeymooners" sketch titled "Women's Lib" as part of a Gleason special on CBS. Four final one-hour specials aired on ABC from 1976 to 1978, with Meadows returning as Alice and Kean as Trixie. These specials came at a time when Gleason and Carney were each achieving newfound expanded fame, with Gleason's prominent role in the box office smash Smokey and the Bandit and Carney winning an Academy Award for his leading role in Harry and Tonto. These were the final original "Honeymooners" productions.

In May 2022, MPI released Jackie Gleason TV Treasures, which includes three previously unreleased "Honeymooners" sketches from the early 1960s, the 1966 musical remake of "The Honeymooners: The Adoption" episode and seven color "Honeymooners" sketch episodes not included in previous collections.

== Awards ==
Carney won five Emmy Awards for his portrayal of Ed Norton—two for the original Jackie Gleason Show, one for The Honeymooners and two for the final version of The Jackie Gleason Show. He was nominated for another two in 1957 and 1966, but lost. Gleason and Meadows both were nominated in 1956 for their work on The Honeymooners. Gleason was nominated for Best Actor–Continuing Performance but lost to Phil Silvers, while Meadows was nominated for Best Actress-Supporting Role but lost to Nanette Fabray. Meadows also was nominated for Emmys for her portrayal of Alice Kramden in 1954 and 1957.

The following table summarizes award wins by cast members, both for The Honeymooners and The Jackie Gleason Show.

Awards for cast members of The Honeymooners
Actor	Awards won	Show
Art Carney	Emmy, Best Series Supporting Actor (1954)	The Jackie Gleason Show
Art Carney	Emmy, Best Supporting Actor in a Regular Series (1955)	The Jackie Gleason Show
Art Carney	Emmy, Best Actor in a Supporting Role (1956)	The Honeymooners
Art Carney	Emmy, Special Classifications of Individual Achievement (1967)	The Jackie Gleason Show
Art Carney	Emmy, Special Classification of Individual Achievements (1968)	The Jackie Gleason Show
Audrey Meadows	Emmy, Best Supporting Actress in a Regular Series (1955)	The Jackie Gleason Show

== Broadcast history ==
Broadcast history of The Honeymooners
Day and time	Preceded by
Saturdays at 8:30 pm (October 1, 1955 – February 18, 1956) Saturdays at 8:00 pm (February 25 – September 22, 1956)	The George Burns and Gracie Allen Show at 8:00 pm (January 7 – February 18, 1956); Stage Show at 7:30 pm (April 14 – June 2, 1956/September 22, 1956); Two for the Money at 7:30 pm (September 8–15, 1956)

== Episodes ==
Overview of the Classic 39 Honeymooners episodes
No.	Title	Written by	Original release date
1	"TV or Not TV"	Marvin Marx and Walter Stone	October 1, 1955
Trixie tells Alice that Ed will be late for bowling as he's buying a new TV set. Trixie suggests that Alice butter Ralph up to get a TV. Ralph comes home and when Alice starts sweet talking to him, he is immediately suspicious. Alice wants a TV and she lets Ralph know. Too cheap to pay the full price, Ralph cons Norton into paying for half a TV set. Ralph then tricks Ed into letting the set stay in Ralph's apartment. Who gets to use the set and when becomes a point of contention. At one point Norton locks Ralph out of the apartment so he can watch what he wants. In the end, Alice admits to herself they should never have gotten the TV. In 1997, TV Guide ranked this episode #26 on its list of the 100 Greatest Episodes of All-Time.
2	"Funny Money"	Marvin Marx and Walter Stone	October 8, 1955
Several counterfeiters are in a room. Ziggy (Victor Rendina) tells the Boss he had to leave a suitcase with $50,000 in fake money on a bus because a cop got on. The Boss calls the bus company and learns that after 30 days if the item is not claimed it goes to the person that found it. The Boss figures that will be the bus driver. Meanwhile, Mrs. Gibson (Ethel Owen), Alice's mother, comes for a visit. Ralph comes home with the suitcase and he and Mrs. Gibson get into a fight. Ralph kicks her out. Norton comes by and Ralph opens the suitcase and finds the money. Alice thinks there's something suspicious about the money. Police Officer Grogan (Frank Marth) comes by collecting for a children's party. Ralph gives him some of the money. Ralph goes on a spending spree and buys lavish things for the apartment. He quits his job and hires Norton as his chauffeur. Suddenly Mrs. Gibson thinks Ralph is the best. Ralph learns that the money is counterfeit and starts to panic. The Boss and Ziggy come by for the money, but Ralph burned it in the oven. The police arrive and take everyone to the station. Alice reminds Ralph that he quit his job and everything he bought has to go back. Jim Boles as Gangster.
3	"The Golfer"	A.J. Russell and Herbert Finn	October 15, 1955
Ralph spreads the rumor around the bus depot that he will be the new assistant traffic manager. Fred (George Petrie) tells the men that Mr. Harper, the man in charge, hasn't made up his mind yet. Ralph wants to get in good with Mr. Harper. When he sees Harper with his golf clubs, Ralph strikes up a conversation about the sport. Despite not knowing anything about golf, Ralph brags about how well he plays. Harper sets up a date in a month for the two to play together. Ralph tells Alice that during the next month, he'll get friendlier with Harper and get the job before the golf game. Fred tells Ralph that Harper wants him to fill in for his golf partner this Sunday. With Norton reading instructions from a book, Ralph tries to learn how to play. Ralph tells Alice that he'll never brag again. Mr. Douglas, a vice president of the bus company, comes by. Douglas tells Ralph that Harper is in the hospital with a chipped ankle bone. Harper won't be able to play golf. Knowing he won't have to play, Ralph brags about how well he plays golf. Douglas says he will be taking Harper's place, so the game is on. Frank Marth as Cassidy John Gibson as Pete.
4	"A Woman's Work Is Never Done"	Marvin Marx and Walter Stone	October 22, 1955
Ralph comes home and complains that Alice didn't wash his bowling shirt and mend his socks. She gives him a long list of all the things she did in the apartment that took up her time. Alice decides to get a job and hire a maid. Alice gets a job at a bakery. Ralph and Alice go to see Mr. Wilson (Frank Marth) at the maid service. Ralph tries to play the big shot. They are introduced to Thelma (Betty Garde), who tells them her demands. Ralph is not happy, but Alice thinks Thelma will be perfect. Norton comes by to meet Thelma. Ralph tries to tells Thelma how to act around a guest. She calls them the "simp" and the "blimp" and says she quits. Later, Ralph tells Ed he can't get Alice to quit, he can't get another maid and he's doing all the housework. Ralph asks Ed to help him, which doesn't go well. Ralph hopes to flatter Alice into quitting her job, but that doesn't work. After Ralph admits housework is harder than he thought, Alice agrees to quit. Thelma goes to work for Norton.
5	"A Matter of Life and Death"	Marvin Marx and Walter Stone	October 29, 1955
Alice tells Trixie that she took her mother's sick dog, Ginger, to the vet. The vet will send her a report later. Alice doesn't want Ralph to find out she spent money on the dog as he hates the thing. Ralph tells Ed that he went to the doctor because he's been feeling tired. When he sees the vet's report on his mother-in-law's sick dog, Ralph mistakenly concludes that he has only six months to live. Ralph is worried that he has no money to leave Alice. Norton suggests that Ralph sell his story to a magazine. Ralph goes to American Weekly magazine and speaks with Dick Gersh (George Petrie). Dick tells Ralph he can't use the story. Gersh's assistant (Les Damon) thinks it might be a great story. Dick wants to be sure Ralph is actually dying and Ralph shows him the doctor's report. They decide to run the story and he will be paid $5000. Alice sees the story in the magazine and asks Ralph what's going on. Alice starts laughing when she sees the doctor's report. She tells Ralph it's the report about Ginger. Ralph is now worried he could be jailed for fraud. He faints and Norton comes by and thinks Ralph's dead. Ralph goes to the magazine and will have Norton pose as a doctor who can cure him. Gersh wants to do a story on Dr. Norton curing Ralph. Ralph tells Gersh the truth and Gersh will run that story.
6	"The Sleepwalker"	A.J. Russell and Herbert Finn	November 5, 1955
Norton has been sleepwalking the past several nights. Trixie wakes Ralph and Alice up saying that Norton is on the roof. Ralph reluctantly goes to get him. Trixie tells Alice that Ed went to see the company doctor. Norton walks in his sleep because he's nervous and upset. The doctor says he should take a couple weeks sick leave. The next night, Alice tells Ralph that the doctor gave Norton some tonic to calm his nerves. So Trixie can get some sleep, Alice suggests that Ralph go upstairs with Norton. Before they go to sleep, Ralph ties a bell on Norton's wrist. Ralph locks the bedroom door and hides to key. During the night, Ed starts to sleepwalk. Ralph doesn't wake up. Norton finds the key and leaves the room. Ralph calls a psychiatrist (George Petrie). The psychiatrist believes that when Norton sleepwalks, he's searching for something. Ed is given truth serum and he mentions a dog named Lulu that he lost. Ralph decides to get Norton another dog, but the psychiatrist isn't sure that will work. Norton now sleepwalks carrying the dog.
7	"Better Living Through TV"	Marvin Marx and Walter Stone	November 12, 1955
Ralph tells Norton that he has a new get-rich-quick scheme. Ralph wants to let Ed in on the deal. Norton says that everytime he goes in on one of Ralph's deals, he goes broke. Ralph wants to sell a multipurpose kitchen utensil. To reach the most potential buyers, he wants to demonstrate it during a live TV commercial. Ralph is sure he can get his share of the money from Alice. Alice refuses to give Ralph any money and mentions several of his other get-rich-quick schemes that fell through. Ralph tells Alice that she never loved him, she just loved his uniform. At the TV studio, Ralph wants to rehearse their commercial again. Norton is the chef of the past. Ralph is the chef of the future and will demonstrate the Handy Housewife Helper. The TV director tells them they will be going live very soon. Ralph's last-minute stage fright ruins the commercial. In 2009, TV Guide ranked this episode #7 on its list of Top 100 Episodes of All Time.
8	"Pal o' Mine"	Leonard Stern and Sydney Zelinka	November 19, 1955
Trixie is upset because Ed gave her one days notice that he's throwing a party for Jim McCeaver, the new foreman. Ed comes by and shows the girls the ring that he got for Jim. Ed asks Alice to wrap the ring for him. Ralph comes home, finds the ring and thinks Ed gave it to him. He puts it on and tells Alice what a great guy Ed is. Alice tells him it's for Jim and now Ralph says Ed's a bum. Ralph can't get the ring off. Ed stops by and will bring Jim down to at least see the ring. Ed, Jim and a couple other guys come by to see the ring and Ralph kicks everyone out. The next day Ed mentions to Alice that he and Ralph will be going bowling that night. Ralph comes home and tells Ed he's bowling with his friend Teddy Oberman (Ned Glass). Ralph says to Ed that he's not going to do anything with him again. Trixie comes by and tells Ed there's an emergency in the sewer. Teddy comes by and helps himself to food from the ice box. When Teddy makes fun of Norton, Ralph says they were never really friends. This changes when he finds out Norton was injured in an explosion in the sewer. Ralph leaves for the hospital. At the hospital, Dr. Hyman checks out Ed and he's free to leave. Another patient is put into Ed's room. Ralph comes by the hospital and is told the patient can have no visitors. Ralph tells Dr. Seefer (Les Damon) that he'll volunteer to give blood for a transfusion. Ralph is wheeled past Ed on a gurney and is startled to see Ed. Ralph and Ed make up. Ralph still has to give the transfusion and Ed asks Dr. Seefer if he could get the ring off Ralph's finger.
9	"Brother Ralph"	Marvin Marx and Walter Stone	November 26, 1955
Alice tells Norton that Ralph got a $10 prize for a suggestion he made down at the bus depot. Ralph comes home and tells them that they followed through with his suggestion. He is now temporarily laid off due to there being too many buses on Madison Avenue, his route. While they're trying to figure out how to pay their bills, Alice decides to go back to work. Ralph is against the idea. Alice tells him that he'll have to do the housework. Alice gets a job doing secretarial work. One day she comes home and tells Ralph she has to go back to work later. She also says that her boss, Tony Amico (John Holland), is coming to pick her up. Ralph finds out that she's the only woman in the office. Alice had to tell Tony that Ralph is her brother because of an office rule of not hiring married women. Norton tells Ralph that Trixie now wants to get a job. Norton says to not worry because Tony's probably an ugly old guy. Tony arrives and he's a very attractive man. Ralph gets jealous when he realizes that Tony is interested in Alice. Ralph talks Tony into working in the apartment. Freddie comes by and tells Alice that Ralph's layoff is over. Ralph kicks Tony out.
10	"Hello, Mom"	Marvin Marx and Walter Stone	December 3, 1955
Ralph is going to a Raccoon Lodge meeting. Alice is having a hard time threading a needle and asks Ralph to do it. Ralph is having no luck doing it. Ed comes by and threads the needle in a second. Ralph gets a telegram saying Mother is coming for a visit. Ralph gets upset. The last time Alice's mother stayed, according to him, "was Christmas and New Year's, except she came New Year's and stayed 'til Christmas." Ralph tells Alice that she can have her mother, he's going to stay at the Norton's. After the meeting, Ed brings out the sleeping cot for Ralph. Trixie asks what's going on. Trixie wants Ed to talk Ralph into staying with Alice. Ed messes things up and Trixie goes to stay with Alice. Ralph goes to his apartment to get his bus uniform. There's a knock on the door and he thinks it's Alice's mother. It turns out it's Ralph's mother. Ralph apologizes to Alice. She shows Ralph a nice letter he wrote to her mother when they were on their honeymoon.
11	"The Deciding Vote"	A.J. Russell and Herbert Finn	December 10, 1955
Ralph comes home with a vacuum cleaner. Alice reminds Ralph that they have nothing to use it on. When Ralph tries to use it, it doesn't work. Norton tries to help Ralph with it and Ralph winds up kicking Norton out of the apartment. Later, Joe Rumsey (George Petrie) comes by. Joe tells Ralph that it's almost for certain that he will be voted Raccoon Lodge convention manager. Joe says that Norton is the deciding vote. Alice tells Ralph that Norton went bowling with Frank MacGillicuddy (John Gibson). Frank is the other man up for convention manager. At the lodge, Ralph comes in and sees Ed and Frank together. Frank wins the election for convention manager. The next day Ralph gets a letter asking to be a reference for Norton. Norton wanted to buy a dining room set on time. Ralph gives a bad reference and goes to mail the letter. Ed tells Alice that he did vote for Ralph. Ed says that Joe Rumsey changed his vote because of a defective vacuum Ralph convinced him to buy. Ed and Ralph make up. But now Ralph feels bad because he mailed the letter. Ed tells him the dining room set was an anniversary present for Alice and him. Cliff Hall as Raccoon Lodge President.
12	"Something Fishy"	Leonard Stern and Sydney Zelinka	December 17, 1955
While at the lodge, Ralph tries to cheat Norton at ping-pong. After the meeting gets started, the men discuss why their membership drive failed to get any new members. They then bring up that this Sunday is the annual Raccoon fishing trip. Ralph complains that every year they vote to not take their wives, but they always give in and take them. Ralph says that this year they have to stand firm. Later, Norton tells Ralph that he hasn't gotten around to telling Trixie. Ralph admits he hasn't told Alice either. Alice comes in wearing a fishing outfit she just bought. Ralph tells her she's not going, but Alice says she is. Ralph tells Norton that they'll out sneak early before the girls get up. The next morning Ralph and Norton get into the car. What they don't know is that Alice and Trixie were sleeping in the back seat. The car won't start. Alice figures out how to start it, but won't tell Ralph what she did unless they take them. Alice guilts the guys into taking them. John Gibson as Raccoon Lodge Member. Cliff Hall as Raccoon Lodge President. Joseph Ruskin as Raccoon Lodge Member.
13	"'Twas the Night Before Christmas"	Marvin Marx and Walter Stone	December 24, 1955
It's Christmas Eve and Alice finishes wrapping Ralph's present. She then tries to find a place to hide it. Trixie tells Alice that Ed gave her an orange juice squeezer that's a statue of Napoleon. Ralph comes home and hides his present for Alice in the same place she hid his. Alice pretends to go up to Trixie's and then catches Ralph looking for his present. Ed comes by and he and Ralph exchange gifts. Ralph shows Ed the present for Alice and it's a box for keeping bobby pins in. Mrs. Stevens (Anne Seymour) comes by with a gift for Alice. It's the exact same box for bobby pins. Later, Ralph has to get a different present, but he has no money. Uncle Leo (Calvin Thomas) comes by with a gift. It turns out to be a $25 gift certificate to a department store. Ralph will use that now to get Alice a gift and replace the certificate when he goes back to work. Ralph thinks that Alice saw Uncle Leo downstairs and he has to give her the certificate. But it was someone else she saw. Ralph decides to hock his new bowling ball. The next morning Ralph and Alice exchange gifts. Alice gives Ralph a new bag for his bowling ball. Ralph tells her the whole story about why he doesn't have his ball anymore. Alice's gift is the Napoleon orange juice squeezer.
14	"The Man from Space"	A.J. Russell and Herbert Finn	December 31, 1955
Ralph tells Ed that he believes he knows how to win the prize of $50 at the Raccoon Lodge costume party. Ralph will need Ed to lend him $10 and he will rent a professional costume. Norton tells him that he had the same idea and already rented a costume. Ralph gets upset and accuses Norton of stealing his idea. Ralph tells Alice he wants to attend the costume party as Henry VIII and he needs $10. Alice won't give him any money. Ed comes by in his costume. He's dressed as the man that designed and built the sewers of Paris. Ralph says he will make his costume and win. It's the night of the party and Ralph shows Alice his costume. She asks him what he's supposed to be. Ralph says that he's the Man from Space. Ed comes by and tells Ralph that the man he thought built the Paris sewers, actually condemned them. Alice shows them her little girl costume. Trixie comes by in her sailor costume. She tells Ed that there's an emergency in the sewer and he has to go to work. At the party, it's time to judge the costumes. The judges think Ralph is dressed as a pinball machine. Ralph is one of the finalists. Norton wins the contest when he arrives at the party at the last minute from work in his work gear. They think he's dressed as the Man from Space. Victor Rendina as Racoon Lodge Member.
15	"A Matter of Record"	A.J. Russell and Herbert Finn	January 7, 1956
Ed comes by with Johnny Bennett, a boy on the stick ball team. Ed borrows an apple from Alice to give to Johnny because he hit a home run. Ralph comes home with two tickets to a popular Broadway murder mystery. The tickets are for that evening. Alice says she can't go because her mother is coming over. Alice suggests that Ralph take Norton. Mrs. Gibson (Ethel Owen) arrives and starts making snide comments about Ralph. Ralph throws out his mother-in-law after she gives away the ending of the murder mystery. Alice soon follows, leaving Ralph alone in the apartment. It's been five days and Ralph tells Ed how much he misses Alice. Norton suggests that Ralph record a message on record with an apology to Alice. Ralph starts his apology and even says sorry to her mother. But then he gets upset and starts insulting her mother. Ralph records a nice apology on another record. Ed winds up mailing the wrong record. Ralph and Ed learn from Johnny that Alice is upstairs talking to Trixie. After a very brief conversation with Alice, Ralph finds out she got the wrong record. Later, Ed tells Ralph he brought Alice the right record and she forgives him. A doctor comes by and tells Ralph and Ed there's a measles outbreak in the apartment. Ralph and Ed have caught the measles and Alice has to stay away for awhile.
16	"Oh, My Aching Back"	Leonard Stern and Sydney Zelinka	January 14, 1956
Alice tells Trixie that she's supposed to go to her mother's that evening as Uncle Leo (Calvin Thomas) is in town. Alice says that Ralph said he would go, but she's sure he'll come up with some excuse to not go. Ralph comes home and goes into the very routine about being too tired that Alice described to Trixie. Alice tells Ralph he's going, but he says he has to rest because there's a company physical tomorrow. Ralph is able to prove there's a physical and Alice leaves. Once she's gone, Ralph and Ed get ready to go bowling. Alice comes back and sees the two in their bowling jackets. Alice tells Ralph he shouldn't risk hurting himself bowling. Ralph tells Norton he's not bowling. Alice leaves for her mother's. Ed talks Ralph into bowling. Despite the team winning, Ralph does hurt his back and is brought home by Ed, Charlie (Frank Marth) and Fred (George Petrie). Fred says Ralph should sleep with a heating pad. Ed takes Ralph's temperature, but then uses a lighter to read the thermometer. Ralph can't let Alice see him like this. Ralph comes up with a plan to spend the night with Ed at his apartment. Alice comes home with Uncle Leo. Leo keeps slapping Ralph on the back. Ed comes back pretending to be sleepwalking and Ralph spends the night with him. The next afternoon Charlie and Fred come by to check on Ralph. They tell Alice about the bowling and Ralph hurting his back. They bring Ralph a Player of the Year trophy and leave. Ralph comes home saying he passed his physical. Alice gives him the trophy.
17	"The Baby Sitter" "Bensonhurst 0–7741"	Leonard Stern and Sydney Zelinka	January 21, 1956
Alice has a phone installed in the apartment. Alice tells Trixie that Ralph doesn't know about it yet and hides the phone. Ralph comes home and tells Alice how happy he is they don't have a phone. That way the bus depot can't reach him when someone calls in sick. The phone rings and Ralph finds out about it. He tells Alice the phone is going because they can't afford it. Alice says she'll find a way to pay for it. Ralph and Ed pretend to go bowling. Ralph will call home and prove to Ed that Alice will already be on the phone. A friend comes by and asks Alice is she knows of a babysitter. Alice volunteers and tells the friend to not let Ralph know. Ralph comes back and accuses Alice of being on the phone. Turns out he called the wrong number. At the barber shop, Harvey Wohlstetter (Frank Marth) says he needs a babysitter. Mr. Bartfeld (Sid Raymond) recommends Alice. Ralph and Ed show up and Ralph says he's going to let Alice keep the phone. Ralph gets upset when Harvey mentions Alice's name. Ralph gets suspicious when Alice tries to rush him through dinner. Alice claims she's going to a movie and leaves. Ralph tells Ed he's going to Harvey's house and confront him and Alice. After Harvey and his wife leave, Ralph shows up. Ralph finds out that Alice is babysitting and feels bad for what he thought. Ralph apologizes to Alice. Victor Rendina as Barber.
18	"The $99,000 Answer"	Leonard Stern and Sydney Zelinka	January 28, 1956
Ralph is a contestant on The $99,000 Answer (a spoof of The $64,000 Question) and meets the host, Herb Norris (Jay Jackson). Ralph is very nervous. Ralph picks popular songs as the category for the questions he'll be asked. Before Herb can ask the first question, time runs out and Ralph will have to come back next week. Back at home, Alice tells Trixie that she hopes that Ralph doesn't build himself up too much and then has a letdown. Ralph is determined to go all the way on the show in spite of Alice's concerns. Ralph says he's at his best when he's under pressure. He tells Alice he'll buy records and sheet music to study and will rent a piano for Norton to play. Alice is worried about what that will cost. Alice tells her mother what the week has been like with Ralph staying home from work and listening to music. It's the night before the show and Ed comes by to work with Ralph. (This episode features a running gag of Norton's when he practices the opening bars to "Swanee River" to warm up.) Mr. Garrity (Bill Zuckert) comes by to complain about the noise. Alice asks them to stop because it's late. Mrs. Manicotti (Zamah Cunningham) drops by with a song for Ralph. It's the night of the show and Ralph is much more confident. Ralph tells Herb that he intends to go all the way to the $99,000 answer. Unfortunately, Ralph flubs the first question, which asks for the composer of "Swanee River". In 1997, TV Guide ranked this episode #6 on its list of the 100 Greatest Episodes of All-Time.
19	"Ralph Kramden, Inc."	A.J. Russell and Herbert Finn	February 4, 1956
Ralph is $20.00 short on his day's receipts on the bus. He convinces Norton to give him that amount by saying that it is an investment in the imaginary Ralph Kramden Corporation. Norton will receive 20% of any money the corporation makes and be vice president. It's been a week and Norton complains that he hasn't seen a return on his investment. Norton wants his money back, but Ralph offers him 35% which Norton accepts. Attorney Frederick Carson comes by the apartment. He is handling the estate of the late Mary Monihan, a long-time passenger on Ralph's bus. Her estate is valued at $40 million and Ralph is mentioned in the will. Ralph thinks he inherited all the money and Norton thinks he's getting 35%. It's the day of the reading and Alice tells Ralph he might only get a little bit of the money. Ralph says Mary only has one other living relative and she didn't like him. Ralph tries to talk Ed into leaving his share of the money invested in the corporation. At the Monihan mansion, the maid is worried about the pet parrot not eating. Ralph and Ed show up. Mr. Carson reads the will and Mary's nephew receives just $1. Ralph is to get Mary's "Fortune" and he thinks he's rich. Ralph is then given the parrot, whose name is Fortune.
20	"Young at Heart"	Marvin Marx and Walter Stone	February 11, 1956
Teenager Judy Connors tells Alice that she's crazy for a boy named Wallace. Judy asks if it's OK that Wallace pick her up for their date at Alice's apartment. Judy tells Alice all the fun things they're going to do on their date. Ralph comes home and Alice wants him to take her out for some youthful activities, starting with roller-skating. Ralph thinks they're too old for things like that. Norton comes by and Ralph tells him what Alice suggested. Wallace arrives and Alice calls for Judy. After they leave, Ralph makes fun of Alice for trying to act young. Alice makes Ralph feel bad for what he said. The next day Ralph dresses younger and Norton brings some records so Ralph can learn to do some new dances. Alice comes home and Ralph says he's taking her out. The Kramdens and the Nortons go dancing and then roller-skating. Ralph isn't doing so well on the skates and things get messy when he tries to bring the girls some coffee. It's the end of the evening and Ralph is in a lot of pain. Everyone winds up having a good laugh about the evening. Ralph reminisces about the fun things he and Alice did when they were younger. Ronnie Burns makes an appearance in this episode as Wallace.
21	"A Dog's Life"	Leonard Stern and Sydney Zelinka	February 18, 1956
Alice gets a puppy from the pound without Ralph knowing about it. The dog will be gone til the next morning getting its shots. Ralph comes home and tells Alice he's going to an emergency meeting at the lodge. Norton comes by and Alice goes to see Mrs. Manicotti. Norton finds the dog food in the ice box and starts eating it. Ralph eats some and loves it. He wants to sell the product and make a lot of money. Ralph decides to asks his boss J. J. Marshall for financial backing. He going to call it Krammar's Delicious Mystery Appetizer, using his and Mr. Marshall's name. The next day Ralph brings some of the appetizer to Mr. Marshall to taste. Marshall likes it and has Mr. Peck (Eddie Kane) and Mr. Tebbetts (Les Damon) try it. Mr. Peck realizes that it's dog food. Back at the apartment, Ed comes by, meets the dog and figures out he ate dog food. Ralph comes home and wants to take the puppy back to the pound. At the pound, Ralph talks to Mr. McGregor (Frank Marth) about returning the dog. When he learns that if no one takes the dog it may be destroyed, Ralph wants it back. Alice comes by and Ralph has the puppy and two other dogs. George Petrie as Janitor.
22	"Here Comes the Bride"	Marvin Marx and Walter Stone	February 25, 1956
The Raccoons are throwing lodge member Stanley Saxon a bachelor party. Stanley is marrying Alice's sister Agnes. All the members tease Stanley about getting married, but he says he's very happy. Stanley tells Ralph that he and Agnes will be moving in with her parents. Ralph tells him that would be a big mistake and he has to be king of his castle. The next day, Ralph and Alice come home after the wedding. Agnes shows up crying saying she and Stanley had a fight. Agnes says that he's a beast and has completely changed. Ralph knows he's the cause. Alice wants Agnes to stay with them for the night. The next morning Ralph tells Norton what happened. Alice tells Norton she can't figure who influenced Stanley to change so quickly. Ralph comes up with a plan to have Agnes see that all husbands give orders. Maybe she'll then change her mind about Stanley. They invite Stanley over for dinner and he and Agnes immediately make up. Stanley tells Agnes and Alice that he should never have listened to Ralph. Ralph comes home and starts giving orders. Alice tells him she knows everything. Stanley and Agnes leave and Ralph apologizes to Alice. Cliff Hall as Raccoon Lodge President.
23	"Mama Loves Mambo"	Marvin Marx and Walter Stone	March 3, 1956
Alice mentions to Ralph that everyone is making a welcome gift for their new neighbor. Ralph and Ed are under the impression the neighbor is an elderly man. Carlos Sanchez (Charles Korvin) comes by and introduces himself. He is a handsome middle-aged man. Carlos tells them that he's a mambo dancer who works nights. He'll be around during the days. Alice comes in and Carlos is very attentive to her, which Ralph doesn't like. Carlos is teaching some of the women in the building how to mambo. Ralph comes home, puts a stop to the dancing and kicks everyone out. Ralph is upset that he'll have a cold meal because of the late dancing. Alice tells him he could learn a lot from Carlos as he's a gentlemen. They have a fight and Alice leaves. Ralph tells Norton that they have got to get rid of Carlos. Mr. Manicotti (Louis Sorin) comes by and complains about Carlos as well. Carlos comes back and Ralph tells him off. Carlos makes the men understand that they need to treat their wives better. Ralph says he's going to change and asks Carlos to teach him the mambo. Alice and Trixie find that their husbands being gentlemen is driving them crazy. The wives ask them to go back to the way they were before. Anne Seymour as Mrs. Stevens.
24	"Please Leave the Premises"	Marvin Marx and Walter Stone	March 10, 1956
Alice tells Norton that Ralph went to the doctor because he's been irritable lately. Ralph comes home in a good mood. He says the doctor gave him a phrase to say to calm him down when he's upset. Landlord Johnson (Luis van Rooten) comes by and informs them that he's raising the rent $5 per month. Ralph is furious and the calming phrase doesn't work. Ralph tells Johnson he's not paying it and he'll just lock himself in the apartment. Johnson says he'll turn off the heat, gas, water and electricity. Ralph says Johnson is bluffing. Alice and Norton are against the idea of fighting the landlord. Later, Ralph has the door to the apartment barricaded and Johnson has everything shut off. Alice says they're running out of food. Norton comes by and says Johnson came by with the Sheriff and an eviction notice. Ed signed the rent increase. Johnson knocks on the door and tells Ralph that the Sheriff is posting a man outside. Ralph won't let Norton leave. Ralph's plan to go out the bedroom window doesn't work as the Sheriff had a man there as well. Alice and Ralph are evicted and are out on the street. Ralph says he's not giving up the fight and then it starts to snow. Ralph then says he'll give up, but only because Alice easily catches a virus.
25	"Pardon My Glove"	A.J. Russell and Herbert Finn	March 17, 1956
Ralph's birthday is coming up and Alice is planning a surprise party for him. Ralph and Ed come home from a lodge meeting. Ed brought a pizza but Alice wants Ralph to have a salad. After she goes to bed, Ralph finds a note about the party. The next day Andre, an interior decorator, is discussing with Alice the changes he's going to make to the apartment. Alice tells Trixie that Morgan's department store is decorating the place for free for an advertising campaign. Alice canceled the birthday party for that evening because Andre will be coming back. Andre left one of his gloves and Alice hides it in the dresser drawer. Ralph comes home and is surprised there's no party. He then thinks it might be up at Norton's place, but Ed says it isn't. Ralph and Ed find the glove. When Alice insists that Ralph go bowling, he becomes very suspicious. Ralph tells Alice that he's going bowling, but then he and Ed hide on the fire escape. Andre comes by. Ralph bursts in from the fire escape and frightens Andre away. Alice explains how the apartment was going to be redecorated and how he ruined everything. Ralph apologizes and Alice gives him his birthday present..
26	"Young Man with a Horn"	A.J. Russell and Herbert Finn	March 24, 1956
Ed tells Ralph that he went to fill out an application for a civil service test. Ed thinks Ralph should take the test as well and maybe get a better job. Alice finds Ralph's old cornet in the bedroom closet and wants to throw it away. Ralph says there are a lot of memories attached to the horn and wants to keep it. Ralph remembers lost career chances, and feels discouraged. Elderly couple Mr. and Mrs. Gunther come by the apartment. They used to live in there and would like to look around. Ralph realizes that the man is August Gunther, who owns a doughnut company. August tells Ralph that he is still young enough to become a success. Ralph should write down his strong and weak points so that he can correct his faults. The next day, Ralph is listing his good points and Norton will list his bad points. Ralph gets upset when Ed write down a lot of silly things. Ed decides to write down Ralph's good points and only lists one thing. But what he writes makes Ralph feel good. Later, the lists are posted on the wall. It's been a week and Ralph and Ed will find out soon if they passed their tests. Ed comes by with the news that neither of them passed. Alice tells Ralph she likes the new Ralph Kramden and he shouldn't give up.
27	"Head of the House"	Leonard Stern and Sydney Zelinka	March 31, 1956
Newspaper reporter Dick Prescott (Frank Marth) stops Ralph and Ed on the street. Prescott asks Norton who's the boss in his house. Norton says he is, but he doesn't want Prescott to print it because he doesn't want Trixie to see it. Ralph shoots off his mouth saying he's the boss and then reluctantly agrees to let it be printed. Prescott says it will be in this evening's paper. That night, Ralph doesn't bring the paper home, but then Norton comes by with one. Alice sees the article and tells Ralph there is no boss in their house. Ralph insists he's the boss and intends to celebrate by drinking a bottle of wine. Ralph goes to get Norton. Alice and Trixie dump out the wine and put in grape juice. Ralph and Ed start drinking and don't notice it's juice. They start getting drunk. Ralph and Ed sing a song and then pass out. The next day at the bus depot, Harry and Freddie (George Petrie) see the article. Norton comes by and then Ralph and Harry and Freddie congratulate Ralph. Joe Fensterblau bets Ralph that he can't order Alice to cook a special dinner for Joe that evening. Ralph calls Alice and she hangs up on him. Ralph decides that he and Ed will cook the meal. Cooking the meal turns into a disaster. Alice bails Ralph out and tells Joe that she ruined the meal and she'll cook him one the next day.
28	"The Worry Wart"	Marvin Marx and Walter Stone	April 7, 1956
Ed asks Alice if they would like to go to an antique show. Alice says she lives with antiques. Ralph comes home and complains about all the bills in the mail. Ralph also got a letter from the IRS and believes it's a tax refund. But the letter orders that he appear at their office the next morning and Ralph wonders what for. Alice tells Ralph to not panic. It's late in the night and Ralph is going over his tax return to see if he made any mistakes. Norton comes down and tries to help Ralph. They go over his deductions and Ralph worries that he didn't claim some poker winnings. They get nowhere. The next morning Ralph and Ed go to see Richard Puder at the IRS office. Puder tells Ralph that he forgot to sign his tax form. Ralph signs it and they leave. They come back and Ralph and Ed say there were a few things they didn't report because they didn't know they had to. Puder gives them another form and thanks them for their honesty.
29	"Trapped"	Leonard Stern and Sydney Zelinka	April 14, 1956
Ralph is about to break the pool hall record for sinking the most consecutive balls. Norton shows up and causes Ralph to miss his shot. While playing a game of pool, Ed irritates Ralph enough that he leaves. Suddenly there are gun shots. Ralph comes back and tells Ed that he was standing outside a bank when a pair of bank robbers run out. They see him and fire a shot at him putting a hole in his hat. Ralph decides he won't tell the police anything because he's afraid the robbers will track him down and kill him. Harry, the pool hall attendant, says that the robbers killed the night watchman. Ralph and Norton leave to go home. Barney Dibbel (Frank Marth), one of the hoodlums, follows them. Ralph comes home and every little thing and noise frightens him. Tommy Manicotti was by earlier and left his water pistol which Alice gives Ralph to return to the boy. Ralph tells Alice what he witnessed and she convinces him to go to the police. As he's about to leave, Barney and Danny (George Petrie), the other hoodlum, show up. A police car is heard outside. The crooks hold Alice hostage and tell Ralph not to say anything to the cops. A Detective (Ken Lynch) shows up and Ralph says he knows nothing. The Detective will leave a cop downstairs and Ralph has one day to talk. Ralph tries to scare the crooks with the water pistol, but Tommy comes to the door asking for it. Norton comes by and the crooks tie him and Alice to chairs. Ralph mouths off to Barney and he takes Ralph into the bedroom to work him over. Ralph beats up Barney and gets his gun. The crooks are taken down to the cop.
30	"The Loudspeaker"	Marvin Marx and Walter Stone	April 21, 1956
Ralph is talking to Norton about the next evenings ceremony announcing the selection of Raccoon of the Year. Ralph believes he will be picked. The Grand High Exalted Mystic Ruler of the Raccoons called Ralph and said that he will be sitting on the dais that night and to be prepared to say a few words. Ralph gets upset when Alice isn't excited about the news. He tells her all the perks that come with the honor and she still doesn't care. The next day Ralph starts to write his "unprepared" acceptance speech. Alice says that the speech won't matter as the guys will all be too drunk. Norton listens as Ralph tries to memorize the speech. Trixie comes by and interrupts Ralph. Ralph then gets the hiccups. It's almost time for the ceremony and Ralph tells Alice a joke he's going to use. Alice doesn't think it's funny. Ralph goes upstairs to get Norton. Morris Fink, the Grand High Exalted Mystic Ruler, comes by and gives Alice the speech he wants Ralph to make. Alice learns that Norton is to be the Raccoon of the Year. Alice gives Ralph the news and she makes him feel better.
31	"On Stage"	Leonard Stern and Sydney Zelinka	April 28, 1956
The Raccoon Lodge is in financial trouble and Ralph, the treasurer, doesn't know what to do. Ralph was writing a letter to the members because no one is paying their dues. Norton comes by the lodge to pick up Trixie from the Ladies Auxiliary meeting. Ralph tells Ed that the ladies suggested putting on a play to raise money. Alice comes by with Mr. Faversham (George N. Neise), a professional director. Faversham tricks Ralph into having the play by telling him what a great actor he is. The day of the play, Trixie tells Alice that the show is a sell out. Trixie says that Faversham's friend, Hollywood producer Herbert J. Whiteside, will be in the audience. Trixie says that Ed was disappointed that he didn't get a part in the play. Ralph comes home and starts "seeing stars" when he learns that Whiteside is in town to cast his new picture. Norton comes by and says that one of the cast is sick and won't make the play. Ed volunteers to fill in and he, Ralph and Alice rehearse a scene. After the show Freddie Muller (George Petrie), chairman of the entertainment committee, congratulates Ralph. He says the show was a financial success. Faversham asks Ralph if Whiteside could speak with him. Ralph thinks Whiteside wants to cast him. Whiteside actually wants Alice for his picture. Alice tells Ralph she turned Whiteside down.
32	"Opportunity Knocks But"	Leonard Stern and Sydney Zelinka	May 5, 1956
Ralph is waiting for Norton outside the Gotham Bus Company building. J. J. Marshall, Ralph's boss, comes out and wants Ralph's help. Marshall received a new pool table as an anniversary gift from his wife. Hearing of Ralph's prowess at pool, he asks Ralph to stop by his house that night to teach him how to play. Norton shows up and Marshall invites him as well. Ralph sees this as a chance to "get in good with the boss" and he doesn't want Norton to ruin it. That night, Ralph and Ed show up to Marshall's apartment. Ralph reminds Ed to compliment Marshall after every shot he takes. Marshall shows up and says he'll learn more if he just watches them play. Ralph tries to start to play, but Norton keeps interrupting by making suggestions to Marshall with improvements for the bus company. Marshall is so impressed with Norton that he offers him a job as the bus driver supervisor. The two will have lunch the next day at Marshall's office to discuss it further. Ralph comes home upset and tells Alice that Norton is going to be his boss. Alice says that Ed might not even take the job. Ed comes by and makes some comments about the job and Ralph kicks him out. Alice tries to cheer Ralph up and he decides to go apologize to Ed. Ed comes back and tells Ralph that Trixie reminded him that those suggestions he made were ones Ralph had come up with before. Ed just phrased them differently and he'll tell Marshall that. George Petrie as Fred.
33	"Unconventional Behavior"	Marvin Marx and Walter Stone	May 12, 1956
Trixie asks Alice if she would like to stay with her while the husbands are at the Raccoon convention. Alice says she's staying at her mother's. Trixie says that Norton saved up spending money ($50 in 1955 = $480 in 2020) for the trip. Alice knows that Ralph will soon be asking her for the money. Trixie suggests only giving him the money if he takes her along. Alice is going to give him the money anyway. Ralph shows Ed some novelty items he bought for the convention. Ralph, in order to get spending money for the trip from Alice, decides to take her along, to Norton's chagrin – since it means Trixie will force him take her along as well. Ralph asks Alice to go with on the trip and believing he really wants her to go, she says yes. She then tells him she was going to give him the money anyway. When Norton asks him how he gets them into these fixes, Ralph replies that he has a "BIG MOUTH!" Ralph and Ed are on the train, but they're not sure the wives are on yet. The train leaves the station. Norton shows Ralph some of his novelty items and he puts him and Ralph in some "trick" handcuffs. The handcuffs won't come off and they have to try and sleep together in the same berth. Things do not go well and a conductor comes by to see what's wrong. They find out they're on the wrong train and heading in the wrong direction.
34	"The Safety Award"	Leonard Stern and Sydney Zelinka	May 19, 1956
Ralph wins an award as the safest bus driver in the city. He will get his picture and a feature story in a magazine. There will also be a ceremony at City Hall where Ralph, Alice, and the Nortons will meet the mayor. Mr. Martin (Frank Marth), a reporter, is interviewing Ralph outside of the bus company. Norton comes by and Martin asks him a few questions. Martin leaves and Ed says that he's worried that something will happen and Ralph will get into an accident. Freddie Muller (George Petrie) comes by and Ralph asks if he could borrow his car. The next day Ralph is a bundle of nerves. Ed and Trixie show up and Trixie and Alice have the same new dress on. Neither woman will change dresses but then they come to an understanding. Ralph and Ed wind up having the same suit jacket and Ralph changes. Ed offers to drive the car because Ralph is nervous, but Ralph says he'll drive. Ralph goes to get the car and then there's a loud crash. Ralph got into an accident, but he claims it wasn't his fault. Norton tells Ralph to settle it with the other guy so the word doesn't get out he was in an accident. At the ceremony, the city administrator (Les Damon) congratulates Ralph. Ralph is told that Judge Hurdle (Calvin Thomas) will give him the award. The judge arrives and it's the guy Ralph got into the accident with. The judge admits that the accident was actually his fault and gives Ralph the award.
35	"Mind Your Own Business"	Leonard Stern and Sydney Zelinka	May 26, 1956
Norton tells Ralph that he believes that the promotion he wants will be given to a guy who's only been there a year. Ralph tells Ed to give his boss an ultimatum, either he gets the promotion or he quits. The next day, Ed tells Alice that he's been fired. Ralph comes home and Alice tells him about Ed. Ed comes back and tells Ralph not to feel bad that his advice didn't work. Alice is upset with Ralph and they both decide to help Ed and Trixie anyway they can. Weeks later, Ed starts a job selling steam irons door-to-door. Trixie feels guilty about eating with Alice and Ralph every night, but Alice doesn't mind. Ed tells Trixie his first day didn't go well and he only sold one iron. So Alice and Ralph don't worry about them anymore, Ed's going to say that he did very well on the job. When Ed tells Ralph how much money he made in one day, Ralph wants the job as well. Ed says he hasn't been there long enough to recommend someone. Ralph tells Alice he's going to charge Ed for the meals they had. Ralph decides to still get the salesman job as a back-up. Then he'll go and give his boss Mr. Marshall an ultimatum. After talking to Mr. Marshall, Ralph decides to keep his job. Norton tells Ralph and Alice that he got his job at the sewer back with a promotion. Norton says that he made up the story of his salesman success so they wouldn't worry about him. He thanks Ralph and Alice for their kindness.
36	"Alice and the Blonde"	Leonard Stern and Sydney Zelinka	June 2, 1956
Ralph and Ed come home late from a Raccoon Lodge meeting. Ed is locked out and wants to use Ralph's fire escape to try and get in through Ed's window. Alice wakes up and is upset with Ralph going out every night and neglecting her. Ralph tells her that the lodge is going broke and he's the treasurer. Ed comes back saying Trixie won't let him in the apartment. Ralph says that the next night he has to play pool with Bert Wedemeyer. Burt could be the next general manager of the bus company and Ralph wants to get on his good side. Ed doesn't think Alice would be happy about it. Ralph suggests taking the wives with to Burt's house. Burt has a new wife and Ralph plans on flattering her. Trixie comes by and Ralph tells her and Alice about going to Burt's house. The wives decide to get all dressed up like they did when they were dating. At Burt's place, Ralph and Ed don't even notice the wives new dresses. Rita Wedemeyer (Freda Rosen) comes in the room and Ralph and Ed fawn all over her and their wives are not happy about it. Alice and Trixie want to leave and come up with a headache as an excuse. Ralph initially expects the wives to go without them, but Alice makes them all leave. The next day when Ralph comes home, Alice is all dolled up and starts flirting with him. She then tells Ralph off about the way he was acting towards Rita. He says he was just doing it to get on Burt's good side. Ralph feels bad for neglecting Alice and says he loves her.
37	"The Bensonhurst Bomber"	Marvin Marx and Walter Stone	September 8, 1956
At the pool hall, George (Leslie Barrett) and Harvey (George Mathews) are about to shoot a game, when they decide to get a drink. Ralph and Norton come in and start playing a game on the table. George comes back and tells them that he and his friend were using this table. Because George is a mousy little guy Ralph tells him to get lost. George says that he's going to tell Harvey about this. Ralph figures that Harvey is also a little guy and says he'll take care of both of them. George comes back with Harvey who is a big tough guy. When Harvey learns that Ralph made fun of his name, he tells Ralph to meet him outside. Ralph says he would, but he has a new suit on. Harvey figures Ralph's scared and lets it go. Ed shoots off his mouth about Ralph and Ralph now has to meet Harvey at a gym on Saturday to settle things. On Saturday Ed tells Ralph about all the guys that are betting on the fight. Ralph says he's not going to the gym and he doesn't want Alice to know about the fight. Alice comes home and Ed says she won't get the secret out of him. Ralph says he's leaving for a couple weeks, but after talking to Alice, he's staying. Ed tries to show Ralph a few boxing moves and hits him in the stomach. Ed comes up with a plan to make Harvey think Ralph can really beat him up. Ed will have a friend of his come to the gym and let Ralph make it look like he knocks him out. At the gym a guy bumps into Ralph and Ralph knocks him out cold. Harvey changes his mind about fighting. Ed shows up and says his friend couldn't make it.
38	"Dial J for Janitor"	A.J. Russell and Herbert Finn	September 15, 1956
The residents of the building are complaining about things that aren't working in their apartments. Mr. Johnson (Luis van Rooten), the landlord, comes by and tells Ralph and Ed that the janitor quit because of them. He had 4 janitors quit this year because they complain about Ralph and Ed. Mr. Johnson says he'll talk to his lawyer about getting them kicked out of the building. Because of the excellent pay and free rent, Ralph takes the janitor job. Alice wants to know how Ralph is going to be the janitor and keep his bus driver job. Ralph installs a house phone in the apartment so the tenants can get a hold of him. Because he went bowling the night before, Ralph has a long list of things to fix. The house phone buzzes constantly and then Norton comes by to complain about his lack of water and the garbage piling up. Ralph is in the boiler room. He figures if he increases the water pressure, it will solve Ed's water issue. While trying to get to the water valve, Ralph gets stuck between two air ducts. Norton tries to help without success. Police and Firemen arrive. Alice wants Ralph to tell Mr. Johnson that he's not capable of doing the janitor job. Ralph tells Johnson he'll be quitting. It's not because he can't handle the job, it just interferes with other things. Johnson says he already has another janitor. Ralph is upset because Norton circulated a petition to have him fired. Ed winds up being the new Janitor.
39	"A Man's Pride"	Leonard Stern and Sydney Zelinka	September 22, 1956
Ralph tells Ed that he ran into Bill Davis. Ralph and Bill both courted Alice. Ralph doesn't like Bill because he's one of those guys who always brags what a great success he is. Bill catches up with Ralph. Bill brags about his manufacturing business and how he's expanding. Ralph doesn't want to admit that he's only a bus driver, so he pretends he's the head of the bus company. Bill would like to see the company but Ralph makes up some excuses. But then Ralph tells Bill a time to come by when he figures his boss Mr. Monahan (Eddie Kane) will have left for the day. The next day, Monahan calls his wife and says he'll be stuck at the office longer than he thought and he leaves the room. Ralph comes in the office and sits at Monahan's desk. Monahan comes back in and Ralph makes up an excuse for being there. Monahan has to leave for 10 minutes. Ed comes in the office with Bill. Ralph is able to get Bill out before Monahan comes back. Bill gets a hold of Alice and arranges for her and Ralph to meet him and his wife Millie at an expensive restaurant. At the restaurant, Ralph tries to avoid talking about business. Ralph and Alice go for a dance. Bill tells Millie that he invited them. Bill didn't want Ralph to know he was just an assistant plumber. Bill hopes that Ralph will pick up the check. Ralph makes the gesture of offering to pay the check and Bill says OK. Ralph confesses he's just a bus driver and can't pay the check. Bill then confesses he can't pay it either. After a good laugh, they pool their money to pay the check.

== Syndication and home media releases ==
The Honeymooners gained its greatest fame in syndication, where it has aired continually since its original cancellation. As of 2026, WPIX in New York City has aired the series for more than five decades (after it had initially run in 1957–1958 on WRCA-TV), with occasional brief breaks. It regularly airs on WPIX, every year on Thanksgiving (along with an airing of March of the Wooden Soldiers afterwards), and with a marathon that begins on the final hour of New Year's Eve and runs well into New Year's Day. In the United Kingdom, it originally aired on ITV between 1958–1963. BBC Two aired 38 of the original 39 episodes beginning in 1989 and ending in 1991. The show also has aired in Australia, Iran, Nigeria, Saudi Arabia, Ireland and Suriname. It previously was seen on WGN America from June 2008 to September 2009 and on Me-TV from December 2010 to September 2011. In April 2012, the show returned to Me-TV. The show currently airs on the network on Sunday nights. Reruns of the show also air on Catchy Comedy.

In 1984, the Museum of Television and Radio announced the discovery of four original "Honeymooners" sketches from The Jackie Gleason Show, and response was overwhelmingly positive. In January 1985, Gleason announced the release of an additional group of "lost" episodes from his private vault. As with the previously released sketches, these "lost episodes" were actually kinescopes from the 1952–55 and 1956–57 runs of The Jackie Gleason Show. Because the prints had not been stored under ideal conditions, parts of the soundtracks of three episodes were unusable, and the voices had to be redubbed. Gleason personally approved the soundalike actors, with noted voice actor Joe Alaskey providing Ralph Kramden's lines.

Gleason sold the broadcast rights to the "lost" episodes to Viacom, and they first were aired from 1985 to 1986 as a series of 68 22-minute episodes on the Showtime cable network. They since have joined the original 39 episodes in syndication and also have been released on VHS and DVD. In September 2004, another "lost" episode was discovered at the Peabody Award archives in Georgia. The episode, titled "Love Letter", originally aired on The Jackie Gleason Show on October 16, 1954. It aired for the first time since then on October 16, 2004, its 50th anniversary, on TVLand. Viacom successor CBS Media Ventures, via CBS Broadcasting, owns the "Classic 39" series outright, while the Gleason estate owns the "lost episodes".

Paramount Home Entertainment/CBS DVD released a six-disc DVD box set titled The Honeymooners "Classic 39" Episodes in November 2003 (only available in Region 1). The set contains all 39 episodes from the series' original 1955–56 broadcast run. Also included in the set is an edited version of a 1990 anniversary special hosted by Meadows as well as original show openings and closings sponsored by Buick that were removed when the show entered syndication.

MPI Home Video released 80 of the "lost episodes" in Region 1 DVD format in 2001–02 on 24 single-disc volumes. MPI subsequently re-packaged the 24 volumes into six four-disc box sets. Production of the 24 individual volumes and the six four-disc box sets ceased in 2008, but MPI has since renewed its deal with Jackie Gleason Enterprises and has continued to release new editions of the "lost" episodes and other Honeymooners material not currently owned by CBS. In 2011, MPI announced the release of a completely restored set of all existing Honeymooners Lost Episodes from 1951 to 1957. The 50-hour, 15-DVD set contains 107 Honeymooners sketches and the home-video debut of the nine existing original DuMont Network sketches, six other sketches never before released on home video and the eight musical Honeymooners episodes from 1957 (the "Trip To Europe" shows). The set was released on October 4, 2011.

Overview of Lost Episodes DVD releases of The Honeymooners
DVD set name	Discs	Episodes	Release date
The Honeymooners Lost Episodes – Box Set Collection 1	4	13	October 30, 2001
The Honeymooners Lost Episodes – Box Set Collection 2	4	13	October 30, 2001
The Honeymooners Lost Episodes – Box Set Collection 3	4	15	January 29, 2002
The Honeymooners Lost Episodes – Box Set Collection 4	4	15	March 26, 2002
The Honeymooners Lost Episodes – Box Set Collection 5	4	12	June 25, 2002
The Honeymooners Lost Episodes – Box Set Collection 6	4	12	August 27, 2002
The Honeymooners Lost Episodes: The Complete Restored Series (60th Anniversary Edition)	15	107	October 4, 2011

In June 2006, MPI released The Color Honeymooners – Collection 1 (NTSC and PAL), which collects the "Trip to Europe" story arc presented on The Jackie Gleason Show in 1966. It has since released an additional three volumes featuring additional episodes from this story arc. AmericanLife TV Network has also aired The Color Honeymooners shows under license from Gleason Enterprises and Paul Brownstein Productions.

In May 2022, MPI released Jackie Gleason TV Treasures, which includes three previously unreleased "Honeymooners" sketches from the early 1960s, the 1966 musical remake of "The Honeymooners: The Adoption" episode and seven color "Honeymooners" sketch episodes not included in previous collections.

Overview of DVD releases of The Color Honeymooners
DVD set name	Discs	Episodes	Release date
The Color Honeymooners, Starring Jackie Gleason – Collection 1	3	9	June 27, 2006
The Color Honeymooners, Starring Jackie Gleason – Collection 2	3	8	February 26, 2008
The Color Honeymooners, Starring Jackie Gleason – Collection 3	3	12	May 27, 2008
The Color Honeymooners, Starring Jackie Gleason – Collection 4	3	12	August 26, 2008

Paramount and CBS Home Entertainment released the 39 episodes on Blu-ray disc in March 2014.

In Australia (Region 4), Shock Entertainment released "The Honeymooners - Classic 39 Episodes" five-disc set in NTSC format on November 13, 2009, rereleased on August 5, 2020.

== Impact ==
- In 1997, the episodes "The $99,000 Answer" and "TV or Not TV" were respectively ranked No. 6 and No. 26 on "TV Guide's 100 Greatest Episodes of All Time".
- In 1999, TV Guide published a list titled "TV's 100 Greatest Characters Ever!" Ed Norton was No. 20, and Ralph Kramden was No. 2.
- In 2002, The Honeymooners was listed at No. 3 on TV Guide's 50 Greatest TV Shows of All Time.
- On June 1, 2007, FOX aired a TV's Funniest Moments special, in which a clip from the episode "The $99,000 Answer" was on the list. In the clip, Ralph lamely identifies the composer of "Swanee River" as being "Ed Norton".
- In 2013, TV Guide ranked The Honeymooners No. 13 on their list of the 60 Greatest Shows of All Time.
- In 2013, the Writers Guild of America ranked The Honeymooners #31 on their list of the 101 Best Written TV Series.
- The instrument used for visible and infrared imaging on the New Horizons space probe was named after Ralph Kramden, in parallel to the Alice instrument (naming not related to the TV show).

== Legacy ==
Because of its enduring popularity, The Honeymooners has been referenced numerous times in American pop culture, and has served as the inspiration for other television shows, most notably The Flintstones. The show also introduced memorable catchphrases into American culture such as "Bang, zoom, straight to the Moon!", "One of these days... one of these days...," "Homina, homina, homina," and "Baby, you're the greatest."

=== The Flintstones ===
In 1960, the Hanna-Barbera-produced animated sitcom The Flintstones debuted on ABC. Many critics and viewers noted the close resemblance of the show's premise and characters to those of The Honeymooners, and William Hanna and Joseph Barbera have both stated that The Honeymooners was among their inspirations for The Flintstones. Gleason later said that he considered suing but decided that becoming known as "the guy who yanked Fred Flintstone off the air" was not worth the negative publicity. The Honeymooners had been compared in its day to the similar comedy series The Bickersons as well as to the work of Laurel and Hardy (particularly Sons of the Desert). The Flintstones series and its spinoffs changed over the years and deviated from the similarities to The Honeymooners.

=== Spoofs, parodies and importation ===
- In the Futurama episode "The Series Has Landed", Ralph Kramden is believed to have been an early astronaut, due to his catchphrase (which Fry protests was "a metaphor for beating his wife").
- In the episode "Spanish Fry" of the same show, Lrrr says, "One of these days, Ndnd, bang! zoom! straight to the third moon of Omicron Persei 8!!"
- The Moonlighting episode "A Trip to the Moon" contains a lengthy parody of The Honeymooners as The Bluemooners, with Bruce Willis as Ralph, Charles Rocket as Norton, Allyce Beasley as Trixie, and Cybill Shepherd as Alice.
- The sitcom The King of Queens was partially inspired by The Honeymooners. The Honeymooners, among other shows, was parodied directly in a dream sequence in the episode "Inner Tube".
- Robert McKimson would pay homage the show with a series of animated Looney Tunes shorts, in which the principal characters, Ralph and Alice Crumden and Ned and Trixie Morton, are depicted as mice and Ralph's "big dream" is to get enough cheese to impress Alice. These cartoons are The Honey-Mousers (1956), Cheese It, the Cat! (1957), and Mice Follies (1960). McKimson would also direct the 1956 Bugs Bunny cartoon Half-Fare Hare, in which Bugs is pitted against caricatures of Ralph and Ed as train-riding hoboes.
  - Friz Freleng would also reference the Honeymooners in the Sylvester and Tweety short Red Riding Hoodwinked (1955) also features the usually-cheerful Granny character taking on the role of blustery, female Ralph. In another Sylvester and Tweety cartoon, A Bird in a Bonnet (1958), when Sylvester falls into an open manhole, inside a voice like Ed Norton's says, "Whoo-hoo-hoo! Hey, look at this, Ralph, a pussycat." To which Sylvester simply peers out of the sewer to the audience.
- The writer/comic Louis C.K. stated in an interview that he based the layout of Louie's apartment in the HBO show Lucky Louie on the Kramdens' apartment, in contrast to other shows such as The King of Queens that have very nicely decorated apartments despite the characters' professed low incomes.
- Stan Freberg created a brief audio skit titled "The Honeyearthers", in which Ralph, Alice, Norton, and Trixie are aliens living on the moon. In keeping with the 1950s ideas of what aliens would look like, they have two heads, one eye, one ear, four hands, three feet and antennae. Ralph drives a rocket ship and Norton works in a "green cheese mine". At the end of the skit, Ralph offers to take Alice on a "honeyearth" to renew their marriage.
- In Back to the Future (1985) George McFly (Crispin Glover) and his older son Dave (Marc McClure) are seen cracking up in nerdy fashion while watching the episode "The Man from Space". After his younger son Marty (Michael J. Fox) goes back in time to November 5, 1955, he watches the same episode at the home of his then-teenaged mother Lorraine Baines (Lea Thompson), where her father (George DiCenzo) wheels their newly acquired television set in front of the family table, saying giddily: "Now we can watch Jackie Gleason while we eat!" – a reference to the TV series. In real life though, November 5, 1955 was the day "The Sleepwalker" aired, while "The Man from Space" aired on December 31.
- In the 21 Jump Street season 3 episode "High High" (where the Jump Street team is assigned to go undercover at a performing arts school), Doug Penhall cites The Honeymooners as one of his favorite shows growing up. Towards the end, he reenacts a scene from the episode "Young Man with a Horn" for acting class.
- The Honeymooners was spoofed in an episode of Perfect Strangers as a result of the character Balki Bartoukomos (Bronson Pinchot)'s spinning an extended metaphor about the characters' existential situation to an episode of The Honeymooners he had once seen; Balki's description of the episode is shown in a black-and-white flashback.
- As Ralph Kramden was a New York City bus driver, one of the service depots in Brooklyn was renamed the Jackie Gleason Bus Depot in 1988. All buses that originate from the bus depot bear a sticker on the front that has a logo derived from the "face on the Moon" opening credits of The Honeymooners. The MTA also took 1948 GM-TDH5101 bus number 4789, renumbered it to 2969 and made it the 'official Jackie Gleason bus'.
- A statue of Gleason as Ralph Kramden stands at the Eighth Avenue entrance to the Port Authority Bus Terminal in New York City. The plaque on the base of the statue reads, "Jackie Gleason as Ralph Kramden — Bus Driver — Raccoon Lodge Treasurer — Dreamer — Presented by the People of TV Land"
- An episode of The Simpsons, "The Ten-Per-Cent Solution", includes a fictional rip-off of The Honeymooners called The Adventures of Fatso Flannigan.
- In 2011, an adult parody titled The Honeymoaners was released by DreamZone Entertainment, with Peter O'Tole as Ralph and Anthony Rosano as Ed. Both actors also played Fred and Barney in The Flintstones – A XXX Parody, an adult parody of the Flintstones, which have a resemblance to the show (as mentioned above). The plot of the parody is similar to the episode "The $99,000 Answer", only here the show is called "The $69,000 Answer" and Ralph is answering questions about sex.
- The Honeymooners was spoofed in episode 22 of the first season of Saturday Night Live (then known as NBC's Saturday Night) in a sketch featuring The Killer Bees (referenced as 'The Bees' in this particular episode). John Belushi took the role of Ralph, with Gilda Radner as Alice, Dan Aykroyd as Norton, and Jane Curtin as Trixie.
- The first adult film parody of the show, Honeymooners, premiered in 1976 and starred John Leslie as the Ralph Kramden character.
- The Toronto Coach Terminal included a restaurant and bar named Kramden's Kafe from 1990 until 2013.
- The Honeymooners was partly the inspiration for the Nickelodeon series Kenan & Kel.
- In 1988 Ron Jeremy led a cast of adult performers in the critically panned The Horneymooners.
- Seth MacFarlane's "Family Guy" has parodied it on numerous occasions.

=== Adaptations and remakes ===
The success of The Honeymooners in countries outside the United States has led to the production of new shows based entirely on it.

==== International remakes ====
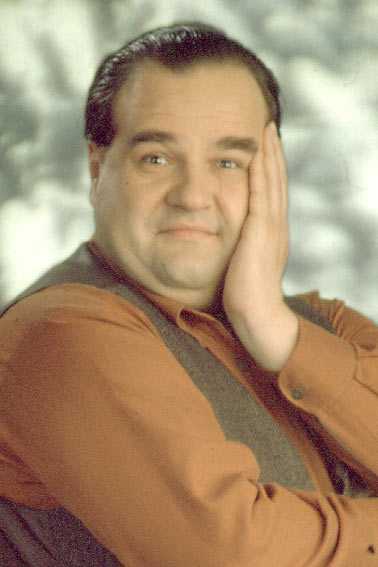
Polish tram driver, Karol Krawczyk (Cezary Żak), inspired by Ralph Kramden in Miodowe lata

===== Indonesia =====
Two series, 26 episodes in all were made for RCTI in 1996. It was the first sitcom of that style ever attempted in Indonesia. It was titled Detak Detik (Ticking Seconds) and starred Mat Sola as the Jackie Gleason character. Art Carney rang the cast prior to production to give them his best wishes. It was decided to make Mat Sola a Silver Bird taxi driver, as they had a bit more prestige in Indonesia. They left Nurbuat, who mirrored Ed Norton, as a sewerage worker. The chemistry worked well. The series had to remove any references to alcohol, as Indonesia is a country with a Muslim majority population.

===== Canada =====
French Canada was entertained for years in the 1960s and '70s by a sitcom titled Cré Basile, with Olivier Guimond, Béatrice Picard, Denis Drouin and Amulette Garneau, which was an uncredited Quebecois version of The Honeymooners. It could, by contemporary standards, qualify as plagiarism.

===== Netherlands =====
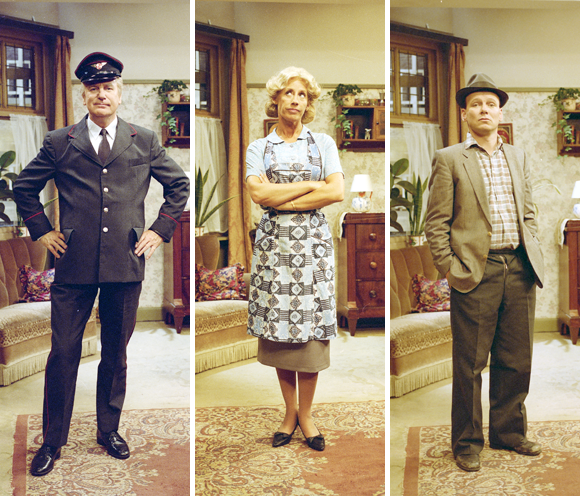
The main cast members of Toen Was Geluk Heel Gewoon (1994–2009)

In 1994, the Dutch broadcasting network KRO produced a version of The Honeymooners titled Toen Was Geluk Heel Gewoon (Back then happiness was common), using translated scripts of the original series but changing its setting to 1950s Rotterdam. After the original 39 scripts were exhausted, the series' lead actors, Gerard Cox and Sjoerd Pleijsier, took over writing, adding many new characters and references to Dutch history and popular culture. The series was a hit in the Netherlands and it finished its run after 16 years and 229 episodes in June 2009. The actors reprised their characters five years later in a feature-length movie. The show's title was taken from a song, "1948 (Toen was geluk heel gewoon)" by comedians Kees van Kooten and Wim de Bie (Van Kooten en De Bie), a Dutch adaptation of Gilbert O'Sullivan's 1972 chart-topping hit "Alone Again (Naturally)" later covered by Cox.

===== Sweden =====
In 1994, the Swedish network TV4 produced a version of The Honeymooners titled Rena Rama Rolf, but changing its setting to contemporary Gothenburg, where Rolf (Ralph), played by Lasse Brandeby, is working as a streetcar driver. The show ran until 1998.

===== Poland =====
In 1998, the Polish network Polsat produced a version of The Honeymooners titled Miodowe lata which translates to "Honey years" (because in Polish a honeymoon is translated as a "honey month"), using both translated scripts of the original series and new ones, but changing its setting to modern-day Warsaw. The original series ran until 2003 and was continued in 2004 as Całkiem nowe lata miodowe.

==== Comics ====
Vince Musacchia created a comic book series based on The Honeymooners for Hypergraphics between 1987 and 1989.

==== Film ====
On June 10, 2005, a feature film remake of The Honeymooners was released, featuring a predominantly African American cast. The roles of Ralph, Alice, Ed, and Trixie were played by Cedric the Entertainer, Gabrielle Union, Mike Epps, and Regina Hall, respectively. The movie was a critical and commercial failure, earning slightly more than US$13 million worldwide. The film was released by Paramount Pictures.

==== Video game ====
In 1988, First Row Software released a Honeymooners computer game for Commodore 64 and MS-DOS. The game involves the Kramdens and Nortons trying to earn $223 for train fare to Miami Beach, where Ralph wants to host the annual Raccoon Lodge convention, by playing a variety of mini-games related to the series. Additionally, players have the option of trying to double their money after each round by answering a Honeymooners-related question in a bonus round based on "The $99,000 Answer" episode.

==== Reboots ====
In December 2016, a CBS reboot of The Honeymooners with Bob Kushell writing and executive producing the series was announced but it never came to fruition. Producers Sarah Timberman, Carl Beverly, Eric & Kim Tannenbaum, and Jeff Greenstein were also announced as part of the development deal.

In January 2022, a CBS reboot of The Honeymooners with Damon Wayans Jr. executive producing the series was announced.

==== Musical ====
In September 2017, Paper Mill Playhouse produced the world-premiere of a musical adaptation of The Honeymooners, starring Michael McGrath as Ralph, Michael Mastro as Ed, Leslie Kritzer as Alice, and Laura Bell Bundy as Trixie. The musical had a book by Dusty Kay and Bill Nuss, with music by Stephen Weiner and lyrics by Peter Mills. It was directed by John Rando and choreographed by Joshua Bergasse.
