= The Money Master =

1915 film

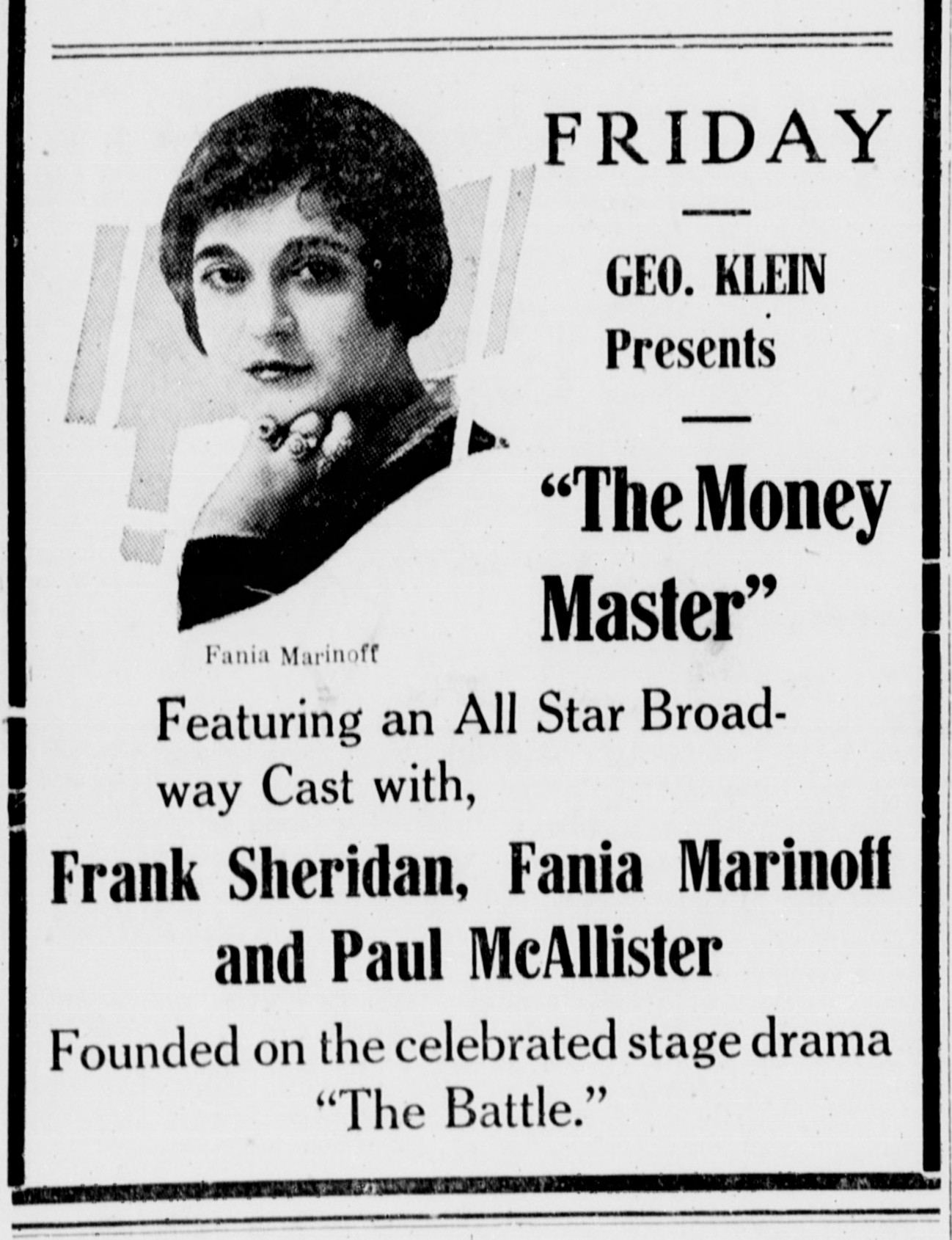
- Newspaper advertisement
- Directed by: George Fitzmaurice
- Written by: Cleveland Moffett (play)
- Produced by: George Kleine
- Starring: Frank Sheridan; Paul McAllister; Calvin Thomas
- Production company: George Kleine Productions
- Distributed by: Kleine-Edison Feature Services
- Release date: September 8, 1915
- Running time: 50 minutes
- Country: United States
- Language: Silent (English intertitles)

The Money Master is a 1915 American silent drama film directed by George Fitzmaurice and starring Frank Sheridan, Paul McAllister, and Calvin Thomas.

== Cast ==
- Frank Sheridan as John Haggleton
- Paul McAllister as Moran
- Calvin Thomas as Philip Haggleton
- Sam Reid as Gentle
- Anne Meredith as Margaret Lawrence
- Fania Marinoff as Jenny Moran
- Bert Gudgeon as Joe

== Preservation ==
With no prints of The Money Master located in any film archives, it is a lost film.

== Bibliography ==
- Jay Robert Nash, Robert Connelly & Stanley Ralph Ross. Motion Picture Guide Silent Film 1910-1936. Cinebooks, 1988.
