= Vengeance Is Mine (1917 film) =

1917 film by Frank Hall Crane

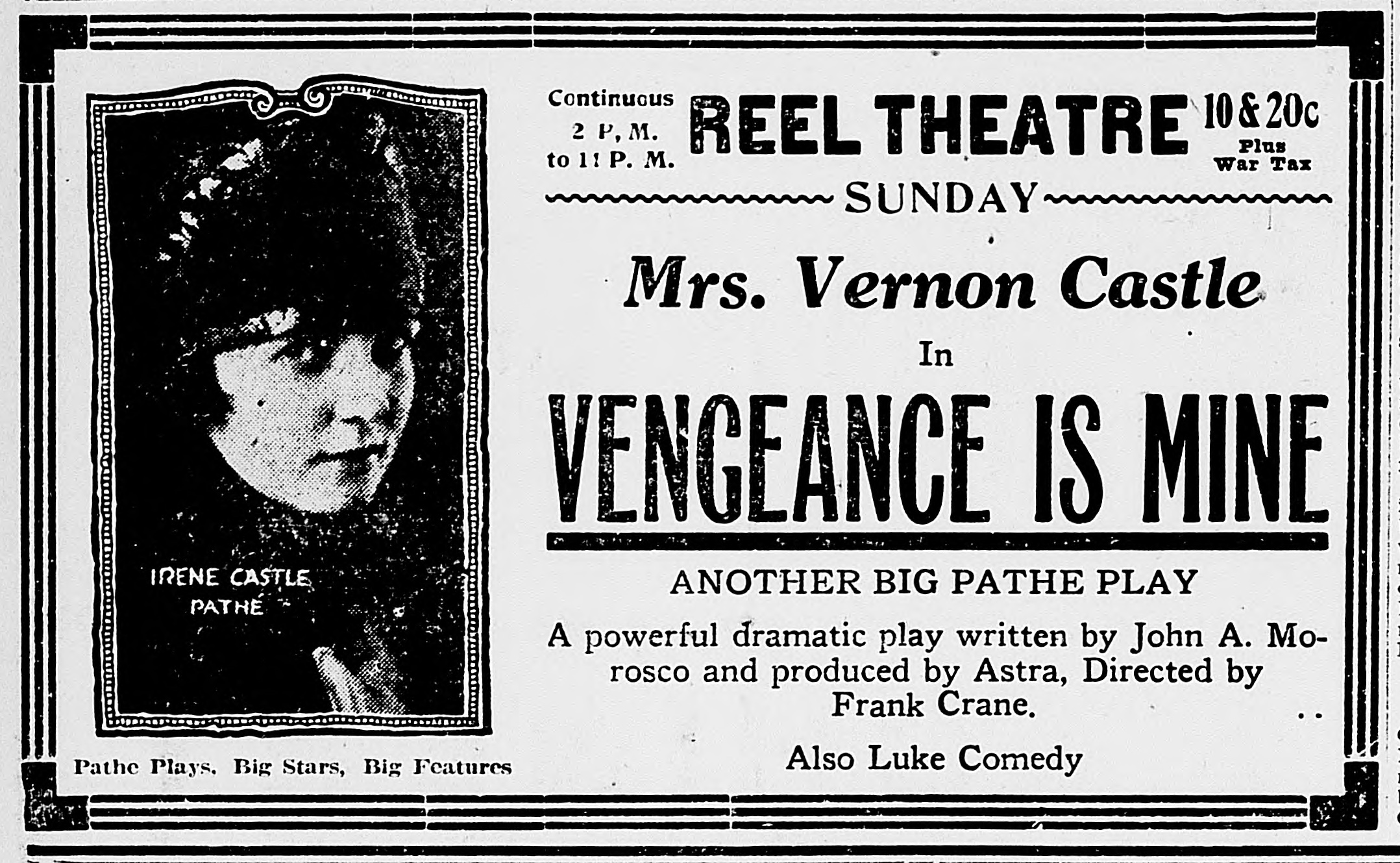
- Newspaper advertisement
- Directed by: Frank Hall Crane
- Written by: John A. Moroso (novel); Howard Irving Young
- Starring: Irene Castle; Frank Sheridan; Helene Chadwick
- Cinematography: Arthur C. Miller; Harry Wood
- Production company: Astra Film
- Distributed by: Pathé Exchange
- Release date: December 16, 1917
- Running time: 50 minutes
- Country: United States
- Language: Silent (English intertitles)

Vengeance Is Mine is a 1917 American silent drama film directed by Frank Hall Crane and starring Irene Castle, Frank Sheridan, and Helene Chadwick.

The film was shot at Fort Lee in New Jersey. George Fitzmaurice worked as a supervising director.

== Cast ==
- Irene Castle as Paula Farrington
- Frank Sheridan as Peter Van Brunt
- Helene Chadwick as Marion De Long
- Elliott Dexter as Dr. Smith
- Edward Hoyt as Undetermined Role
- Reginald Mason as Undetermined Role
- Ethel Grey Terry as Undetermined Role
- Frank Monroe as Undetermined Role
- Julia Stuart as Undetermined Role
- Fred Tiden as Undetermined Role

== Bibliography ==
- Donald W. McCaffrey & Christopher P. Jacobs. Guide to the Silent Years of American Cinema. Greenwood Publishing, 1999. ISBN 0-313-30345-2
