= Victor Rendina =

American actor (1916–1985)

- Victor Rendina in The Godfather 1972
- Born: December 28, 1916; New York City, New York, U.S.
- Died: July 8, 1985 (aged 68); Orange, California, U.S.
- Occupation: Actor
- Years active: 1953–1985

Victor Rendina (December 28, 1916 – July 8, 1985) was an American film and television actor who was perhaps best known for his portrayal of Philip Tattaglia in the film The Godfather.

Rendina also appeared in television shows including The Honeymooners and Matt Houston, and films such as The Man Who Wasn't There (1983) and Racing with the Moon (1984).

== Filmography ==
Year	Title	Role	Notes
1971	Jennifer on My Mind	Old Man	Uncredited
1972	The Godfather	Don Philip Tattaglia	
1983	The Man Who Wasn't There	Head Dude	
1984	Racing with the Moon	Mr. Luzzato	
