= Frank Sheridan (actor) =

American actor (1869–1943)

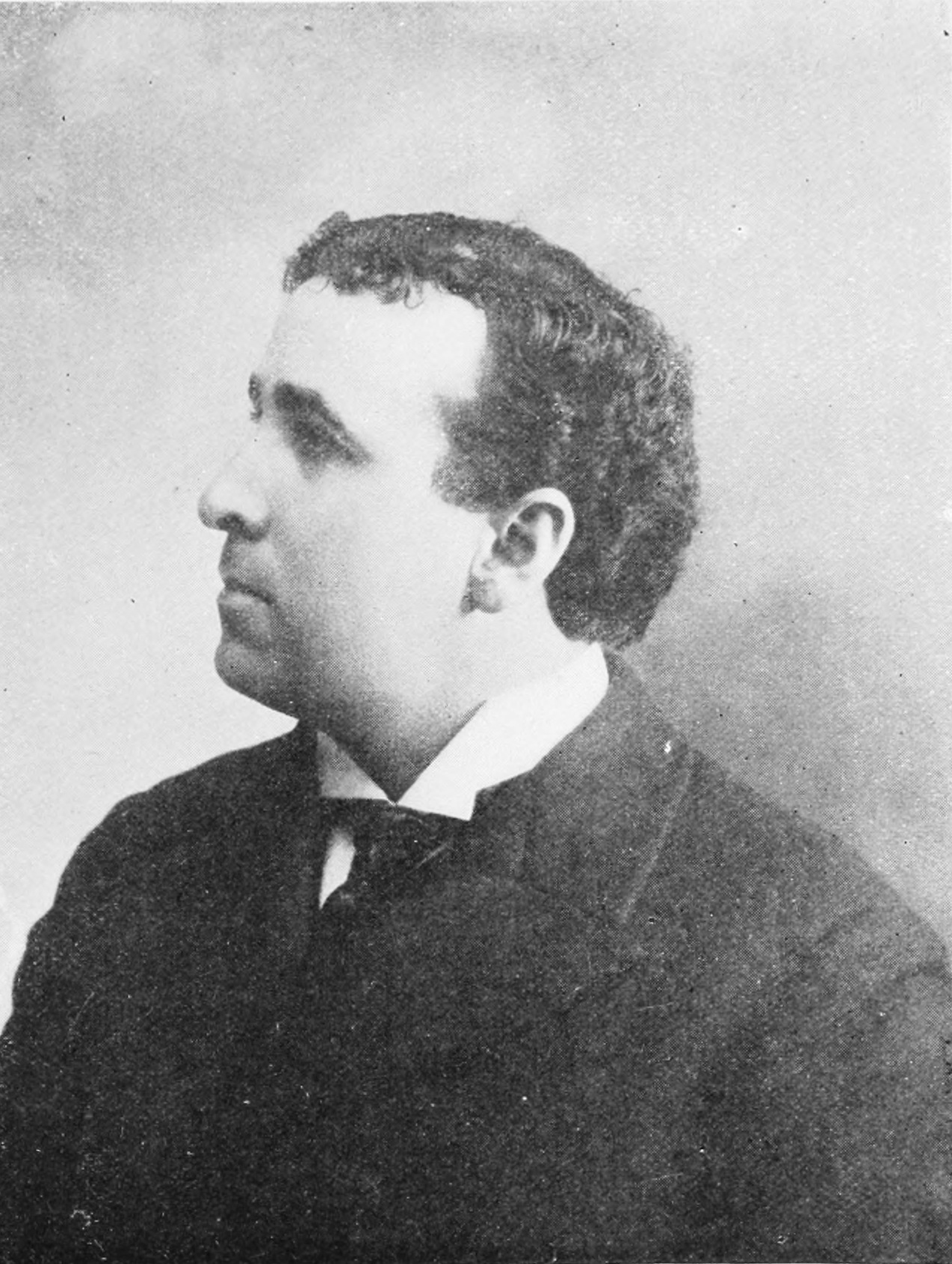
- Sheridan in 1903
- Born: John Franklin Sheridan; June 11, 1869; Boston, Massachusetts, U.S.
- Died: November 24, 1943 (aged 74); Hollywood, California, U.S.
- Occupation: Actor
- Years active: 1915–1940
- Spouses: Catherine T. McNulty (m. 1926; died 1943) Edna M. Carroll (m. 1943)
- Children: 1

John Franklin Sheridan (June 11, 1869 – November 24, 1943) was an American actor of the silent and early sound film eras. With his comedy partner Joseph Flynn, he performed in the vaudeville duo Flynn and Sheridan.

== Biography ==
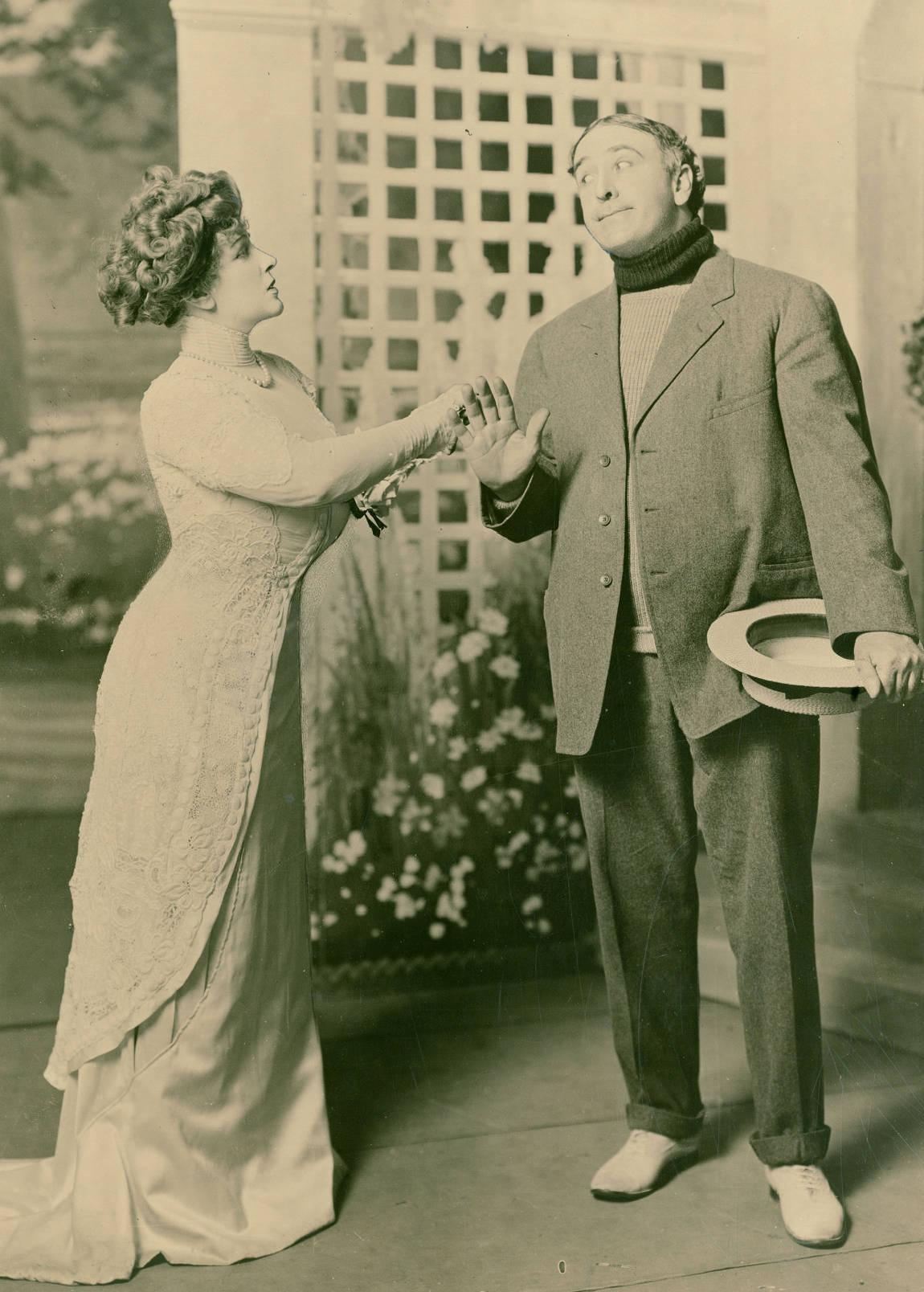
Frank Sheridan with Lillian Russell in the play Wildfire (1908)

Born in Boston, he began acting later in life, at the age of 46, and had several leading roles. As time went on, he segued into the character actor role and continued working right into his 70s. Although mostly in smaller roles, he continued to enjoy featured roles occasionally throughout the 1930s, as in his role of Sam Stubener in the 1936 film Conflict, which starred John Wayne.

In 1926, Sheridan married Catherine T. McNulty, who died in 1943. Later that same year, he married Edna M Carroll and they had one child. Frank Sheridan died on November 24, 1943, in Hollywood, aged 74.

== Filmography ==
(Per AFI database)

An * denotes a featured or starring role.

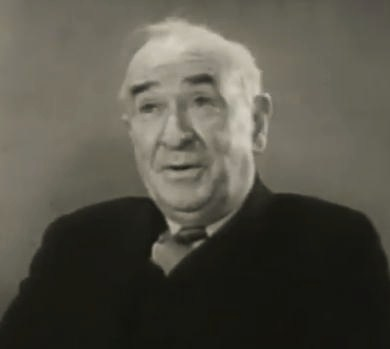
Sheridan in The Little Red Schoolhouse (1936)

- At Bay (1915) as District Attorney Graham*
- The Money Master (1915) as John Haggleton*
- The Perils of Divorce (1916) as John Graham*
- The Struggle (1916) as Major James Carewe*
- Enlighten Thy Daughter (1917) as Daniel Stevens*
- Vengeance Is Mine (1917) as Peter Van Brunt*
- Ruler of the Road (1918) as Hugh Tomlinson*
- A Daughter of Two Worlds (1920) as Black Jerry Malone*
- Anne of Little Smoky (1921) as "The" Brockton*
- Her Lord and Master (1921) as Fred Stillwater*
- The Rider of the King Log (1921) as John Xavier Kavanagh*
- One Exciting Night (1922) as The Detective
- The Man Next Door (1923) as Curley*
- Two Shall Be Born (1924) as Dominick Kelly*
- Lena Rivers (1925) as Henry Rivers Grahme Jr.*
- Fast Life (1929) as Warden*
- Side Street (1929) as Mr. O'Farrell*
- Danger Lights (1930) as Ed Ryan*
- The Other Tomorrow (1930) as Dave Weaver*
- Ladies of the Big House (1931) as Warden Hecker*
- The Public Defender (1931) as Charles Harmer*
- The Flood (1931) as David Bruce Sr.*
- Silence (1931) as Joel (Alva) Clarke*
- Young Donovan's Kid (1931) as Father Dan*
- Murder by the Clock (1931) as Chief of Police
- A Free Soul (1931) as Prosecuting Attorney (uncredited)
- Broken Lullaby (1932) as Priest
- Washington Merry-Go-Round (1932) as Kelleher
- The Roadhouse Murder (1932) as District Attorney
- The Last Mile (1932) as Warden Frank Lewis*
- Okay, America! (1932) as Police Commissioner
- Afraid to Talk (1932) as Police Commissioner
- Deception (1932) as Leo
- The Man Who Dared: An Imaginative Biography (1933) as Senator John McGuinness*
- The Woman Accused (1933) as Inspector Swope
- Mama Loves Papa (1933) as The Mayor
- Speed Demon (1933) as Captain Torrance*
- The Cat's-Paw (1934) as Police Commissioner Dan Moriarity*
- Stand Up and Cheer! (1934) as Senator
- Upper World (1934) as Inspector Kellogg
- Wharf Angel (1934) as The Captain
- The Witching Hour (1934) as Chief of Police
- The Merry Widow (1934) as Judge
- The Whole Town's Talking (1935) as Russell
- The Revenge Rider (1935) as Jed Harmon*
- The Spanish Cape Mystery (1935) as Walter Godfrey*
- Front Page Woman (1935) as Warden
- Frisco Kid (1935) as Mulligan
- Whispering Smith Speaks (1935) as Gordon D. Harrington Sr.*
- Death Flies East (1935) as Warden
- Men Without Names (1935) as Police Captain
- West Point of the Air (1935) as General Debbin
- Nevada (1935) as Tom Blaine
- The Payoff (1935) as George Gorman
- His Night Out (1935) as Detective
- Woman Wanted (1935) as Judge
- The Best Man Wins (1935) as Captain of the salvage tug
- Murder with Pictures (1936) as Police Chief
- Country Gentlemen (1936) as Chief of Police
- Missing Girls (1936) as Prison Warden
- The Little Red Schoolhouse (1936) as Warden Gail
- Conflict (1936) as Sam Stubener*
- The Voice of Bugle Ann (1936) as Nathan
- San Francisco (1936) as Founders' Club Member (uncredited)
- The Leavenworth Case (1936) as Silas Leavenworth*
- The Life of Emile Zola (1937) as M. Van Cassell
- Parnell (1937) as Sheriff (uncredited)
- The Great O'Malley (1937) as Father Patrick
- Maytime (1937) as Committeeman
- Woman in Distress (1937) as Inspector Roderick
- A Fight to the Finish (1937) as Warden
- City Streets (1938) as Father Ryan*
- Secrets of a Nurse (1938) as Warden
- Heroes in Blue (1939) as Mike Murphy*
- Black Friday (1940) as Chaplain
