= Streets of New York =

Streets of New York may refer to:

== Music ==
- Streets of New York (album), a 2006 album by Willie Nile
- "Streets of New York" (Kool G Rap & DJ Polo song)
- "Streets Of New York", a 1981 song by The Wolfe Tones, reached #1 in Ireland
- "Streets of New York", a 2003 song by Alicia Keys from The Diary of Alicia Keys UK and Japanese edition
- "Streets of NY", a 2004 song by Terror Squad from True Story
- "The Streets of New York" (In Old New York), a 1906 song from operetta The Red Mill

== Drama, television, and film ==
- The Streets of New York (play), an 1857 play by Dion Boucicault
  - 1913 Pilot Films Corporation adaptation
  - The Streets of New York (1922 film), a silent film starring Dorothy Mackaill based on Boucicault's play
  - Streets of New York (1939 film), a film by William Nigh based on Boucicault's play
  - The Streets of New York (musical), a 1963 musical based on Boucicault's play

== See also ==
- New York Avenue (disambiguation)
- New York Streets, a former football team in the National Arena League
- List of numbered streets in Manhattan
- List of eponymous streets in New York City
