= Darkest Russia =

Darkest Russia may refer to:

- Darkest Russia (film), a silent film directed by Travers Vale based on the play
- Darkest Russia (play), a play by H. Grattan Donnelly and Sidney R. Ellis
- Darkest Russia (The Jewish Chronicle), supplement of The Jewish Chronicle
