= Sidney R. Ellis =

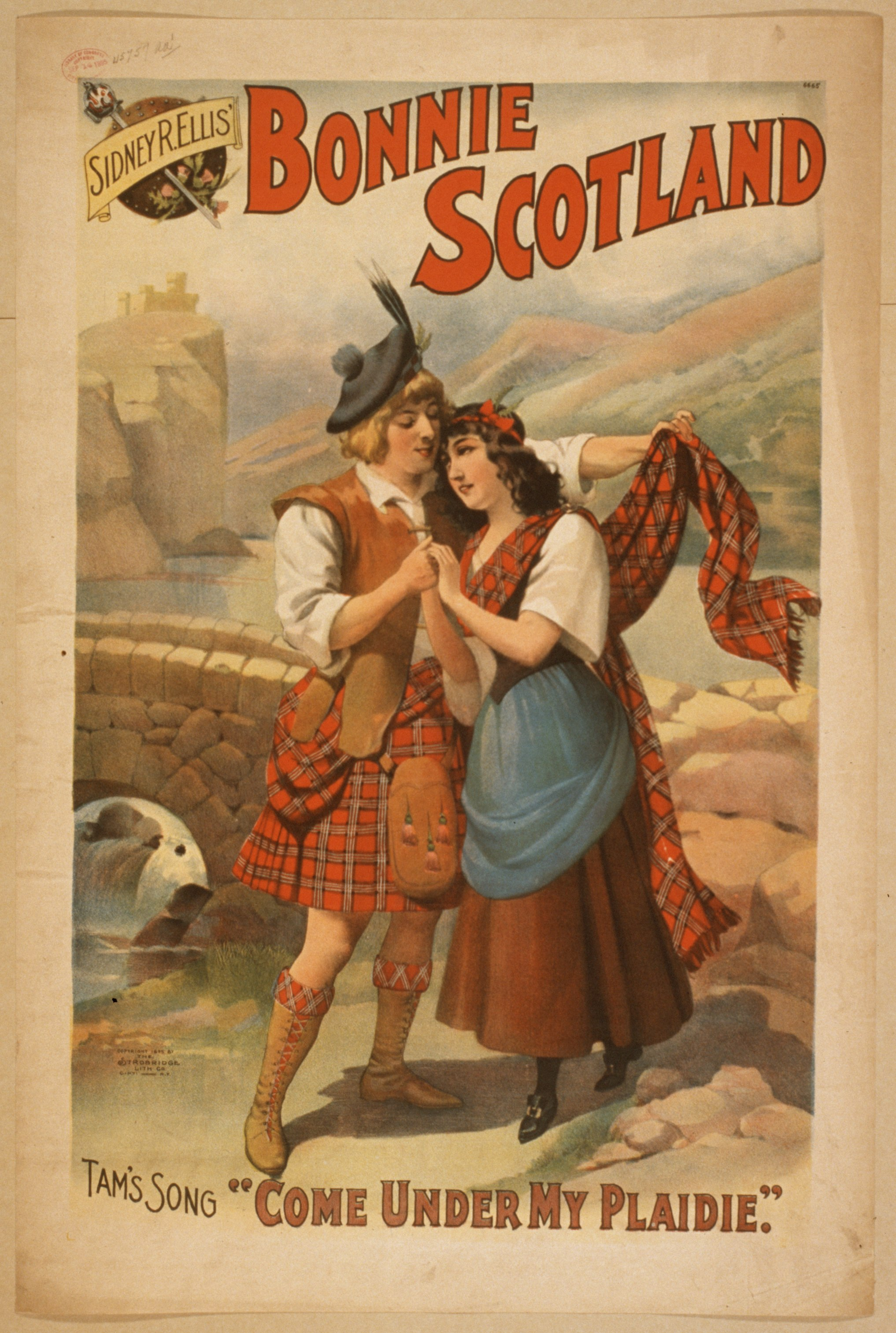
Poster for Sidney R. Ellis's Bonnie Scotland.

Sidney Robert Ellis, sometimes given as Sydney R. Ellis, (January 12, 1857 – August 31, 1924) was an American playwright, actor, theatrical producer, and talent manager. Born and raised in Pittsburgh, Pennsylvania, he began his career as an actor in stock theatre in his native city in the 1870s. He toured as an actor with a variety of theatre troupes in the late 1870s and 1880s before co-authoring the plays Fatherland (1888) and Captain Karl (1891) with the actor and singer Charles A. Gardner. Ellis managed and produced national tours of these two shows which had Gardner in the lead parts.

Ellis co-authored the play Darkest Russia (1893) with H. Grattan Donnelly which was later adapted into a silent film in 1917. Several of his works were staged on Broadway, including his play Bonnie Scotland (1895) and the play with music The Watch on the Rhine (1900; Broadway in 1905) for which he wrote both book and lyrics. In his later career he spent seventeen years managing the career of the German singing comedian Al Wilson until his retirement in 1918. He was married to the stage actress Eva Byron.

== Life and career ==
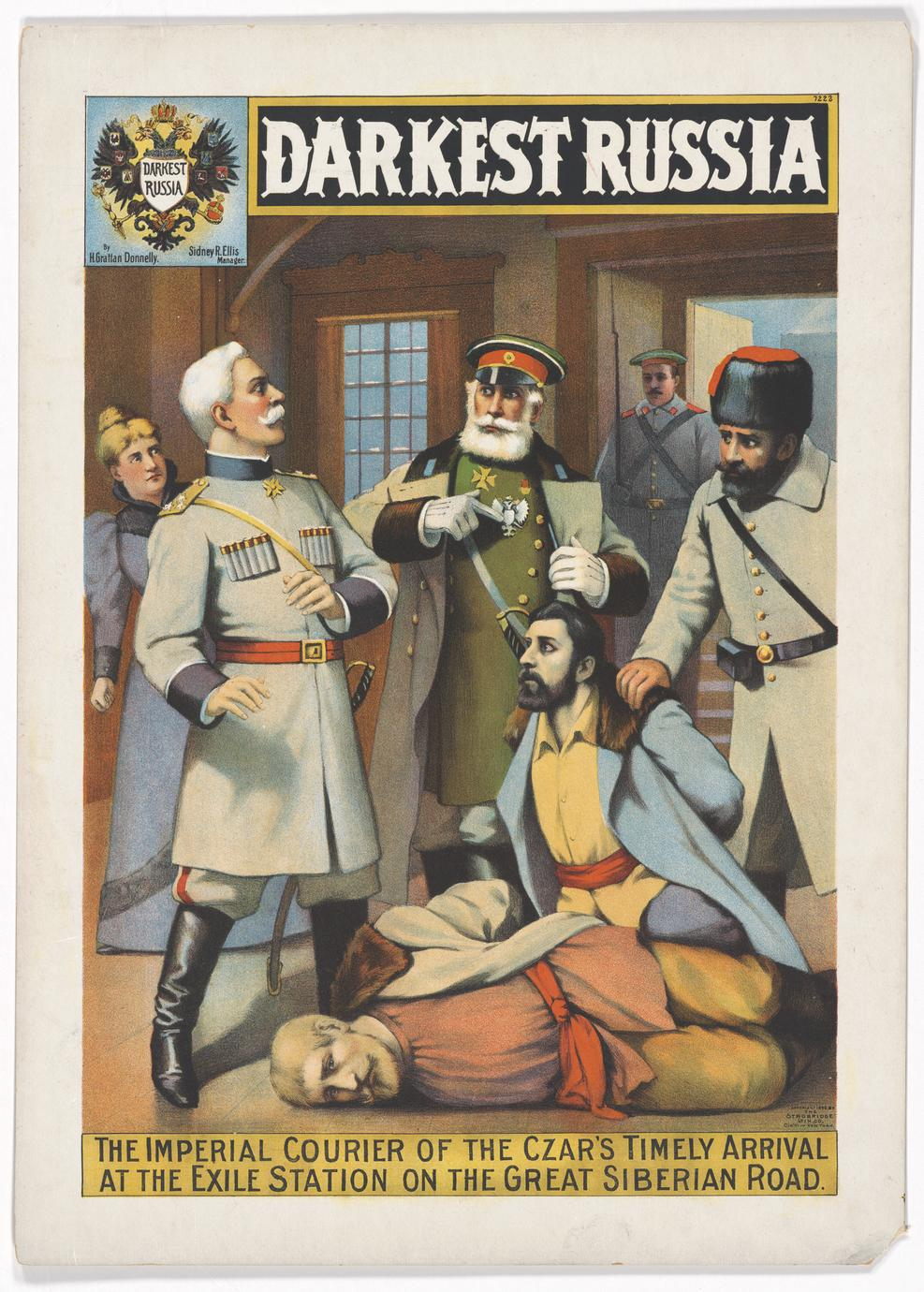
Poster for H. Grattan Donnelly and Sidney R. Ellis's Darkest Russia.

The son of Robert Ellis and Nancy Ellis (née Rigdon), Sidney R. Ellis was born in Pittsburgh, Pennsylvania on January 12, 1857. He began his career as an actor with the Pittsburgh National Stock Company. In the 1878–1879 season he toured as a member of Jay Rial and Milt Gotthold's stage production of Uncle Tom's Cabin. In 1879 he performed in John Courtney's Eustice Baudin (re-titled A Man of Mystery) at Hamlin's Theatre in Chicago, and as The Signal Man at Shrewsbury Road in Augustin Daly's Under the Gaslight at Heuck's Opera House in Cincinnati. By 1882 he had joined the theater company of Oliver Doud Byron; performing the part of Thomas Goodwin in Bryon's touring play Across the Continent.

In 1883 Ellis performed in Maggie Mitchell's theatre troupe as the Baron in George F. Fuller's The Little Savage, and remained with her company in 1884 as the Priest in The Pearl of Savoy. In March 1885 he was engaged at the Academy of Music in Buffalo, New York as Patrick Kavanagh in Fred Marsden's Shaun Rhue in a production headlined by Joseph Murphy (1832–1915). In 1886 he performed in Boston at the Howard Athenaeum as the Governor General in Bartley Campbell's Siberia, and portrayed Squire Redmond in William J. Scanlan's Shane-na-Lawn at the Detroit Opera House with the playwright in the title role. He repeated the role of Squire Redmond in return engagements to Detroit, at Philadelphia's Walnut Street Theatre (1887), and Boston's Globe Theatre (1888). In May 1888 he returned to the Buffalo Academy of Music in Marsden's The Irish Minstrel; and subsequently toured in this show to Canada.

With the actor and singer Charles A. Gardner he co-authored the play Fatherland; a show which included music by Gustave H. Kline and featured Gardner in the lead part. It premiered on October 24, 1888, at Peak Hall in Niles, Michigan. Ellis became the manager of the road company of this show which began its tour in Fort Wayne, Indiana in November 1888. The early part of the tour included stops at theaters in Pennsylvania (1888–1889), Michigan (1889), Wisconsin (1889), British Columbia, Canada (1889), California (1889), Wyoming (1889), Missouri (1889), and Florida (1889). On January 28, 1890, the theatre troupe was in a bad train accident in White Sulfur Springs, West Virginia in which music director Kline and actor William Dell were seriously injured. The company resumed touring in the 1890–1891 season beginning with performances at the Haymarket Theatre in Chicago. The tour then proceeded on to New Orleans (1890), Little Rock, Arkansas (1890), Pottsville, Pennsylvania (1891), and Milwaukee, Minnesota (1891).

Ellis and Gardner's second play, Captain Karl, was given its premiere at the Music Hall in Wilkes-Barre, Pennsylvania on October 7, 1891. This show toured under Ellis's management to Philadelphia (1891, Peoples Theatre), Chicago (1891, Haymarket Theatre), St. Louis (1891, Pope's Theatre), New Orleans (1892), and Leavenworth, Kansas (1892). In August 1892 Ellis and Gardner returned to Fatherland for a production staged in New York City at the Union Square Theatre. The show ran there into 1893. His play Darkest Russia (1894, co-authored with H. Gratten Donnelly) was a commentary on the oppressive conditions that existed for people living in the Russian Empire of the 19th century. It was adapted by screenwriter Frances Marion into the 1917 silent film of the same name directed by Travers Vale.

Ellis's play Bonnie Scotland was staged on Broadway at Haverly's 14th Street Theatre in 1895. He wrote the book to the musical The Evil Eye which he directed for its production at the Grand Opera House in Manhattan in 1899. He wrote both the book and lyrics to the musicals A Prince of Tatters (1902, Metropolis Theatre) and The Watch on the Rhine (1905, Murray Hill Theatre; premiered in 1900). He managed the career of the German singing comedian Al Wilson. Their partnership of 17 years ended in 1918. He was married to the stage actress Eva Byron who died in 1919.

Ellis died on August 31, 1924, in Woodcliff, New Jersey.
