= Bonnie Scotland =

Bonnie Scotland may refer to:

- Bonnie Scotland (horse), a British Thoroughbred racehorse
- Bonnie Scotland (film), a 1935 American film directed by James W. Horne and starring Laurel and Hardy
- Bonnie Scotland (play), a play by Sydney R. Ellis with music by Albert Anderson
