= Football coach =

Football coach may refer to:

- Manager (association football)
- Coach (American football)
  - Head coach
  - Offensive coordinator
  - Defensive coordinator
  - Special teams coordinator
- College Coach, a 1933 American film

== See also ==
- Coach (sport)
- Strength and conditioning coach
