= Louise Rial =

American actress

- Born: Louise Grover; 1848 or 1849
- Died: August 10, 1940; New York City, New York (Manhattan County)
- Resting place: Kensico Cemetery, Valhalla, New York (Westchester County, New York)
- Other name: Louise Briehl
- Occupation: actress
- Years active: 1880s-1919
- Spouse: James Grove Rial (aka Jay Rial)
- Children: 1

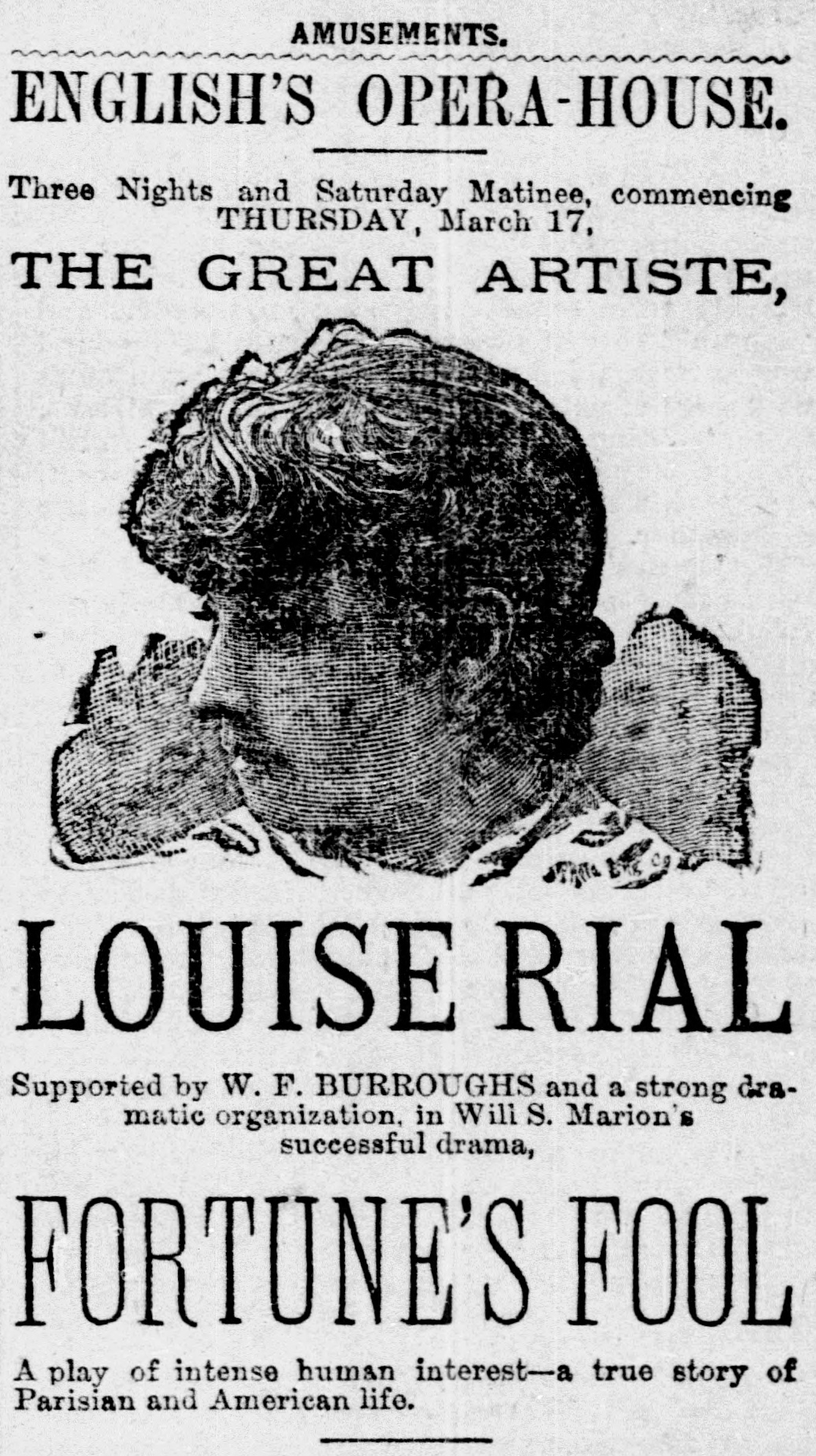
Louise Rial in an advertisement for Fortune's Fool, 1887

Louise Rial (1848 or 1849 – August 10, 1940) was an American stage and film actress.

Rials's parents were Thomas C. Grover and Caroline Grover (nee Chamberlin). She had four siblings Burr, Leonard, Lucien and Julia Grover. Her theatrical debut came in Uncle Tom's Cabin (1878). In 1895 she performed on Broadway as Catherine Epsworth in Sidney R. Ellis's Bonnie Scotland. She continued acting on stage before entering silent films in 1915 with the early Fox Film Corporation.

On August 10, 1940, Rial died in her New York City home, aged 91. She is buried in an actor's plot at Kensico Cemetery Valhalla New York. Her daughter Vira Rial is buried with her in the plot.

== Filmography ==
- Sin (1915)
- The Marble Heart (1916)
- A Wife's Sacrifice (1916)
- The Spider and the Fly (1916)
- A Daughter of the Gods (1916)
- Tangled Lives (1917)
- My Little Sister (1919)
