= Père Goriot (1915 film) =

1915 film by Travers Vale

Père Goriot is a 1915 silent film based on the 1835 novel of the same name by French novelist and playwright Honoré de Balzac. Directed by Travers Vale, the film starred Edward Cecil in the title role. It was made by the Biograph Company, and consisted of three reels.

== Cast ==
- Edward Cecil as Goriot
- Kate Toncray as Mme. Goriot
- Jack Mulhall as Eugene
- Vivian Prescott as Anastasie Goriot
- Helen Hart as Delphine Goriot
- Marie Newton as Victorine
- Mrs. A.C. Marston as Madame Blanc
- Hector V. Sarno (as Hector Sarno) as The Count
- Herbert Barrington as The Baron

== Bibliography ==
- Amnon Kabatchnik (2017). Blood on the Stage, 1800 to 1900: Milestone Plays of Murder, Mystery, and Mayhem. Rowman & Littlefield Publishers. ISBN 9781538106181.
- Alan Goble, ed. (2011). "Père Goriot". The Complete Index to Literary Sources in Film. Bowker-Saur. ISBN 9783110951943.
- Richard E. Braff (2002). "Père Goriot". The Braff Silent Short Film Working Papers: Over 25,000 Films, 1903-1929, Alphabetized and Indexed. McFarland & Company. ISBN 9780786410316.
