= Western Pluck =

1926 film

- Directed by: Travers Vale
- Written by: Wyndham Gittens; W.C. Tuttle
- Produced by: Carl Laemmle
- Starring: Art Acord; Marceline Day; Ray Ripley
- Cinematography: Edward Linden; Harry Neumann
- Production company: Universal Pictures
- Distributed by: Universal Pictures
- Release date: January 24, 1926
- Running time: 50 min.
- Country: United States
- Language: Silent (English intertitles)

Western Pluck is a 1926 American silent Western film directed by Travers Vale and starring Art Acord, Marceline Day, and Ray Ripley.

== Plot ==
As described in a film magazine review, cowpuncher Arizona Allen witnesses a runaway stage coach when the horses flee after a shot fired by Rowdy Dyer, done as a greeting for his sister Clare who is visiting from the East, which was mistaken for a robbery. Allen chases down and stops the stage by bringing the galloping horses to a halt. He promises Clare that he would look after her wild brother. Later the stage is really held up and Rowdy is suspected of the crime. Circumstantial evidence is against him, but Allen supports him and fights for him until his innocence is proved. Allen wins the affection of Clare.

== Cast ==
- Art Acord as 'Arizona' Allen
- Marceline Day as Clare Dyer
- Ray Ripley as Gale Collins
- Robert Rose as 'Rowdy' Dyer
- William Welsh as 'Dynamite' Dyer
- Helen Cobb as Molly
- S.E. Jennings as Buck Zaney
- Charles Newton as Sheriff Wayne

== Bibliography ==
- Munden, Kenneth White. The American Film Institute Catalog of Motion Pictures Produced in the United States, Part 1. University of California Press, 1997.
