= The Woman Beneath =

Silent drama film

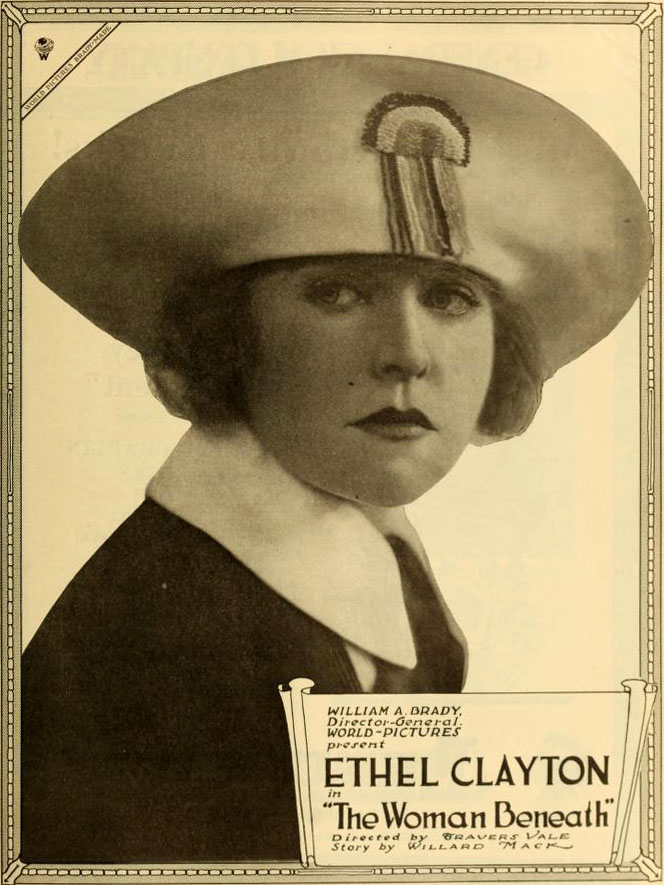
- Directed by: Travers Vale
- Written by: Willard Mack
- Produced by: William A. Brady
- Starring: Ethel Clayton; Crauford Kent; Isabel Berwin
- Cinematography: Max Schneider
- Production company: World Film
- Distributed by: World Film
- Release date: September 24, 1917
- Running time: 5 reels
- Country: United States
- Languages: Silent; English intertitles

The Woman Beneath is a 1917 American silent drama film directed by Travers Vale and starring Ethel Clayton, Crauford Kent and Isabel Berwin.

In the film, Betty Fairchild is a New York society girl who marries a mine owner for his money.

== Plot ==
Tom Connolly, who has discovered a wealth of gold out West, falls in love with Now York social butterfly Betty Fairchild, who is much sought after by Rupert Brantley, but who does not plan to marry her. Betty is schooled by her mother to be a "good match," and when proposed to by Tom, she accepts. Tom is summoned home and witnesses the death of his sister Ellen, who has been missing for three years, but she doesn't reveal the name of the man who betrayed her. He later marries Betty, though she tells him that she doesn't love him, and over time they become strangers to each other. They move into a mansion, and Betty continues to pay visits to Brantley where he confesses that he loves her and tries to embrace her, which she rejects. Believing that Betty only cared about him for his money, Tom purposely suffers financial loss on Wall street and tells her that he is ruined. Unknown to Tom, Betty sells her jewels, cars and house, and establishes a home in Harlem for the two of them. Mrs. Fairchild urges her daughter to divorce Tom while she's still young, but Betty refuses, wanting to prove herself worthy of him. Meanwhile in Colorado, Tom's mother finds a bag with old letters and a photo of Ellen's betrayer, which proves the treachery of Brantley. She sends them to Tom, but Betty opens the letters and believing Tom's mother's handwriting to be a woman who he's in love with. She goes to Brantley, telling him he must leave the country or else her husband will kill him after seeing the letters. Tom finds her in Brantley's apartment, and accuses her of being Brantley's lover, and in order to save Brantley's life, says she is. Tom leaves, and Brantley snatches the letters from Betty and burns them. Betty returns home and finds the envelope that the letters came in, and pleads with her husband to tell Brantley "My wife has told me everything and I will kill you if I ever see you again." and it will restore his faith in her. He does as he is asked and Brantley, afraid of the consequences should Tom learn of his relations with his sister, leaves the country. Betty explains her actions and Tom confesses to purposefully losing his money, and they reunite in love and happiness.

== Cast ==
- Ethel Clayton as Betty Fairchild
- Curtis Cooksey as Tom Connolly
- Isabel Berwin as Mrs. Fairchild
- Frank de Vernon as Mr. Fairchild
- Crauford Kent as Rupert Brantley
- Eugenie Woodward as Mrs. Connolly

== Reception ==
Motion Picture News reviewer R.E. Pritchard felt that the film was "never convincing and though the turns of the story sometimes bring a thrill of surprise, one is convinced from the first of the certain ending." The reviewer had praise for Ethel Clayton's "charming screen presence," but found Curtis Cooksey's performance to be "always artificial."

Exhibitors Herald's review was positive, stating that "It has been well produced and offers an hour of good entertainment."

Motography reviewer George W. Graves gave the film a mostly positive review, though he found the story to be "strained" towards the end.

Wid's Daily gave the film a mixed review, with the reviewer finding that the acting of Ethel Clayton and Curtis Cooksey "pulled this out of an awful hole that it would certainly have been dumped in except for the players."

== Censorship ==
Before The Woman Beneath could be released in Chicago, the Chicago Board of Censors required several cuts. The scenes removed were: Reel 2, subtitle: "Don't send for Tom after all he's done for me; I'm ashamed to face him." Reel 4, letter: "I am sending them to you, Tom, knowing you will never allow her betrayer, etc." Reel 5, same letter as before; subtitles: "Now that you have the name you might as well have the game"; "Tell him what you like; he won't believe you. The girl is dead."
