= Shadow of Doubt (1935 film) =

1935 film by George B. Seitz

- Directed by: George B. Seitz
- Screenplay by: Wells Root
- Based on: Shadow of Doubt; 1935 novel by Arthur Somers Roche
- Produced by: Lucien Hubbard
- Starring: Ricardo Cortez; Virginia Bruce; Constance Collier; Isabel Jewell; Arthur Byron; Betty Furness
- Cinematography: Charles G. Clarke
- Edited by: Basil Wrangell
- Music by: Score: R.H. Bassett; Songs: Burton Lane (music); Harold Adamson (lyrics)
- Production company: Metro-Goldwyn-Mayer
- Distributed by: Metro-Goldwyn-Mayer
- Release date: February 15, 1935
- Running time: 74 minutes
- Country: United States
- Language: English

Shadow of Doubt is a 1935 American mystery film directed by George B. Seitz and written by Wells Root. The film stars Ricardo Cortez as Sim Sturdevant, whose fiance Trenna Plaice (Virginia Bruce) is suspected in the murder of movie producer Len Hayworth (Bradley Page). Sturdevant's aunt (Constance Collier) investigates and identifies the real killer. Based on a story by novelist Arthur Somers Roche, the film was released on February 15, 1935, by Metro-Goldwyn-Mayer.

== Plot ==
Sim Sturdevant visits his aunt Melissa Pilson. Pilson is upset about his affair with actress Trenna Plaice. Pilson thinks Plaice is a social inferior and only after money. Sturdevant says he plans to marry Plaice, and has secured a radio contract for her that will allow her to continue her acting career while living with him in New York. However, Plaice rejects Sturdevant's proposal, saying she has a movie offer and marriage proposal from Len Hayworth. Sturdevant and Plaice argue until Plaice calls Hayworth to accept his proposal. Immediately after Sturdevant leaves, Plaice receives a call back from Lisa Bellwood, who claims she will be marrying Hayworth the next day.

Sturdevant goes to a club, where he offers the radio contract to singer Johnny Johnson. Hayworth and Bellwood also come to the club, which upsets Johnson because Hayworth has made unwanted advances to her. Johnson's boyfriend, press agent Reed Ryan, approaches Sturdevant's table at the same time as Hayworth. Hayworth tells Ryan about Sturdevant's failed proposal, and Sturdevant punches Hayworth in the face.

Hearing a rumor that Hayworth wants revenge for his humiliation, Johnson follows Hayworth home from the club. At the same time, Plaice visits Hayworth's home, where she is admitted by a butler who tells her he needs to go out, but she can wait for Hayworth inside. Bellwood brings home Hayworth, who has passed out drunk, and leaves him on a couch, not realizing that Plaice is in the next room. Soon after, Hayworth's butler returns and finds him dead on the couch from a gunshot wound.

The police suspect Plaice because she admits to being in Hayworth's home. She also previously owned a pistol of the same type used in the murder, although she claims to no longer have it. Plaice tells Sturdevant she went to Hayworth's to turn down his proposal, because she wants to marry Sturdevant instead. Hayworth's butler calls claiming to know who committed the murder. When Plaice goes to meet the butler, he is killed by an unknown shooter, using the same type of gun that killed Hayworth.

When Pilson visits Plaice and sees how distraught she is, Pilson decides she is innocent. Plaice believes the gun she used to own was stolen by her former butler, but Pilson finds the gun in Plaice's apartment. Pilson removes the gun before police can find it. Pilson sets a trap by talking openly about having the gun. She claims to have located the butler who stole it and says he will be coming to testify about who he sold it to. The killer is revealed to be Ryan, who was jealous over Hayworth's advances towards Johnson. As a collector of Hollywood memorabilia, Ryan had previously purchased the stolen gun from Plaice’s butler, and used it to divert suspicion.

== Cast ==
- Ricardo Cortez as Simeon "Sim" Sturdevant
- Virginia Bruce as Trenna Plaice
- Constance Collier as Melissa Pilson
- Isabel Jewell as Inez "Johnny" Johnson
- Arthur Byron as Morgan Bellwood
- Betty Furness as Lisa Bellwood
- Regis Toomey as Reed Ryan
- Ivan Simpson as Morse
- Bradley Page as Len Hayworth
- Edward Brophy as Lieutenant Wilcox
- Samuel S. Hinds as Mr. Granby
- Richard Tucker as Mark Torrey
- Bernard Siegel as Ehrhardt
- Paul Hurst as Lieutenant Sackville

== Production and release ==
Arthur Somers Roche wrote the novel Shadow of Doubt in 1934. It was serialized in Collier's starting on October 13, 1934, and concluding on January 5, 1935. Roche sold the movie rights to Metro-Goldwyn-Mayer while the serial was still in galley proofs, and Wells Root was assigned to write the screenplay.

The movie was released on February 15, 1935.
