= Darkest Russia (play) =

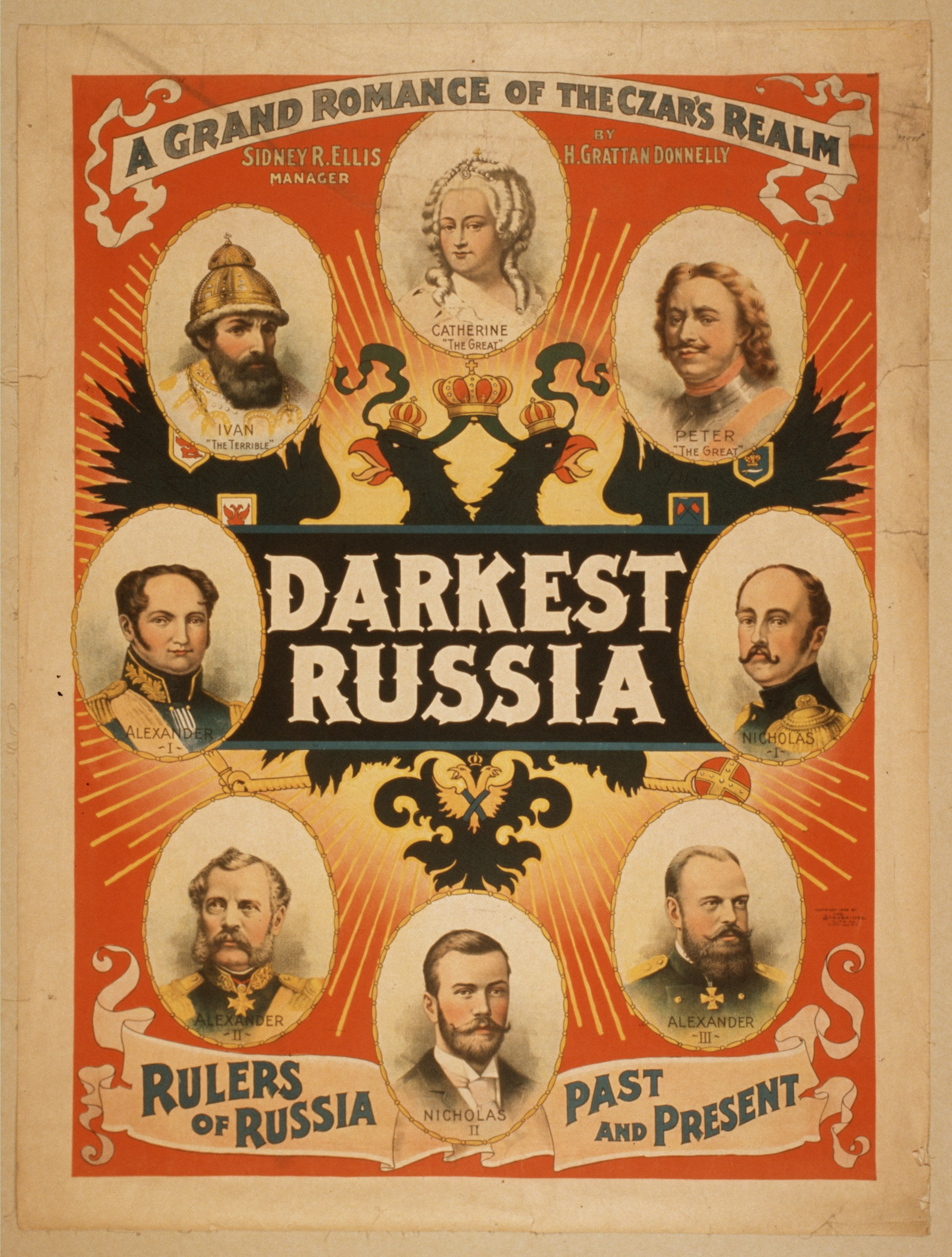
Poster for Darkest Russia.

Darkest Russia is a play by H. Grattan Donnelly and Sidney R. Ellis. It premiered at the Chestnut Street Opera House in Philadelphia on September 18, 1893 with Donnelly as the credited playwright and Ellis credited as director and manager of the production. Later sources credit both men as the work's playwrights. It toured in the 1893-1894 season which included a run at the Fourteenth Street Theatre on Broadway where it opened on January 8, 1894. Well received in New York, it ran there longer than initially planned for six weeks. It returned to New York later that year for a run at the Columbus Theatre.

Other stops on the Darkest Russia tour included performances at the Grand Opera House in Wilmington, Delaware (1893), (1893) the Grand Opera House in Harrisburg, Pennsylvania (1893). the Bijou Theater in Pittsburgh (1893), the Lyceum Theatre in Cleveland (1893), the Academy of Music in Buffalo (1893), the Taylor Opera House in Trenton, New Jersey (1893), the Hyperion Theater in New Haven, Connecticut (1893), the Bowdoin Square Theatre in Boston (1893), the Chestnut Street Theatre (1894) in Philadelphia, the Academy of Music in Washington, D.C. (1894), the Fulton Opera House in Lancaster, Pennsylvania (1894), the Academy of Music in Jersey City, New Jersey (1894), and the Bijou Theatre in Brooklyn (1894).

The play was adapted by screenwriter Frances Marion into the 1917 silent film of the same name directed by Travers Vale.
