= Gladys Valerie =

American actress (1890–1972)

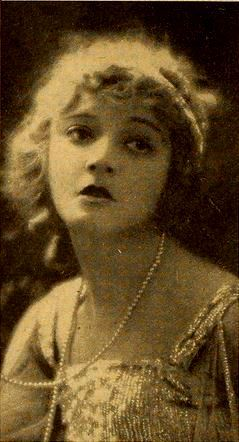
Valerie in 1920

Gladys Valerie (June 27, 1890 – September 1972) was an American singer and actress during the silent film era.

== Life and career ==
Valerie was born Gladys Valerie Hays, on 27 June 1890, in Wheeling, West Virginia. She was the daughter of Rudolph A Hays and Edith Ida Hays, nee Koon. She was raised and educated in New York City.

On the 30th June 1914 she married Mark Barth, a teacher in Manhattan.

In 1919, Valerie sang at a benefit concert for blind soldiers. In the Harrisburg Telegraph, it was written that "Gladys Valerie sang at a concert given for the benefit of blind soldiers, and judging by the warm reception which the audience accorded her, Miss Valerie's voice has lost none of its original beauty since her sojourn in the silent drama. Miss Valerie sang on the operatic stage before taking up picture work."

In a November 1919 issue of Motion Picture News, it was written that "Gladys Valerie was somewhat surprised recently by the noticeable enthusiasm and pleasure evinced by a certain young lieutenant who had just returned from overseas, upon being presented to Miss Valerie. She ventured to ask the reason for his somewhat unusually cordial acknowledgement of the introduction, and was very much astonished to learn that she was considered the "Best Girl" of Company D - 105 Artillery A. E. F. It seems that when a picture show was given in camp, each company adopted some screen luminary who appealed to the voters as their "Best Girl" and Miss Valerie had been chosen by this lieutenant's company for that distinction."

In a December 1919 issue of Motion Picture News, it was written that "Gladys Valerie selected a certain dress from a wholesale house the other day. Hardly had the dress reached home, than Miss Valerie was called to the telephone, and an interested voice asked whether they might name the spring models that they intended making from the one she chose, the Gladys Valerie frocks. Miss Valeria, with her usual graciousness, replied that she had no objection whatever."

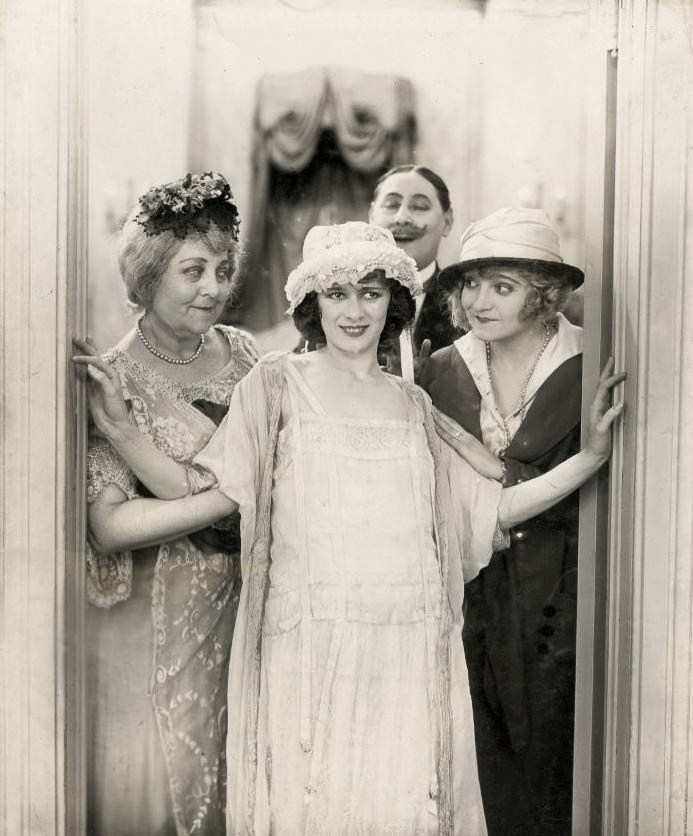
Gladys Valerie on the right in a still from The Mind the Paint Girl

In 1922-1923 Valerie appeared on stage in the play "Tiger Lily," which featured actor Sessue Hayakawa in the leading role.

In 1932 it was reported that Gladys Valerie was working at the WINS radio station, acting multiple parts in sketches which she had also written and produced.

According to the 1940 US Census, Valerie had no occupation, but in the 1950 US Census, she was working in the advertising industry.

== Partial filmography ==
- The Heart of a Girl (1918) as Helen Murray
- Marie, Ltd. (1919) as Zelie
- Mrs. Wiggs of the Cabbage Patch (1919) as Maggie Duncan
- The Mind the Paint Girl (1919) as Jimmie Birch
- Dawn (1919) as Mazie Sanborn (a film directed by J. Stuart Blackton and based on a novel by Eleanor H. Porter)
- Thoughtless Women (1920) as the sister
- Behind Masks (1921) as Kate Cansard
- A Pasteboard Crown (1922) as Edna Thrall
- The Live Wire (1925)
- Tin Gods (1926)
- The Broadway Drifter (1927) as Laura Morris
