= Sin (1915 film) =

1915 film

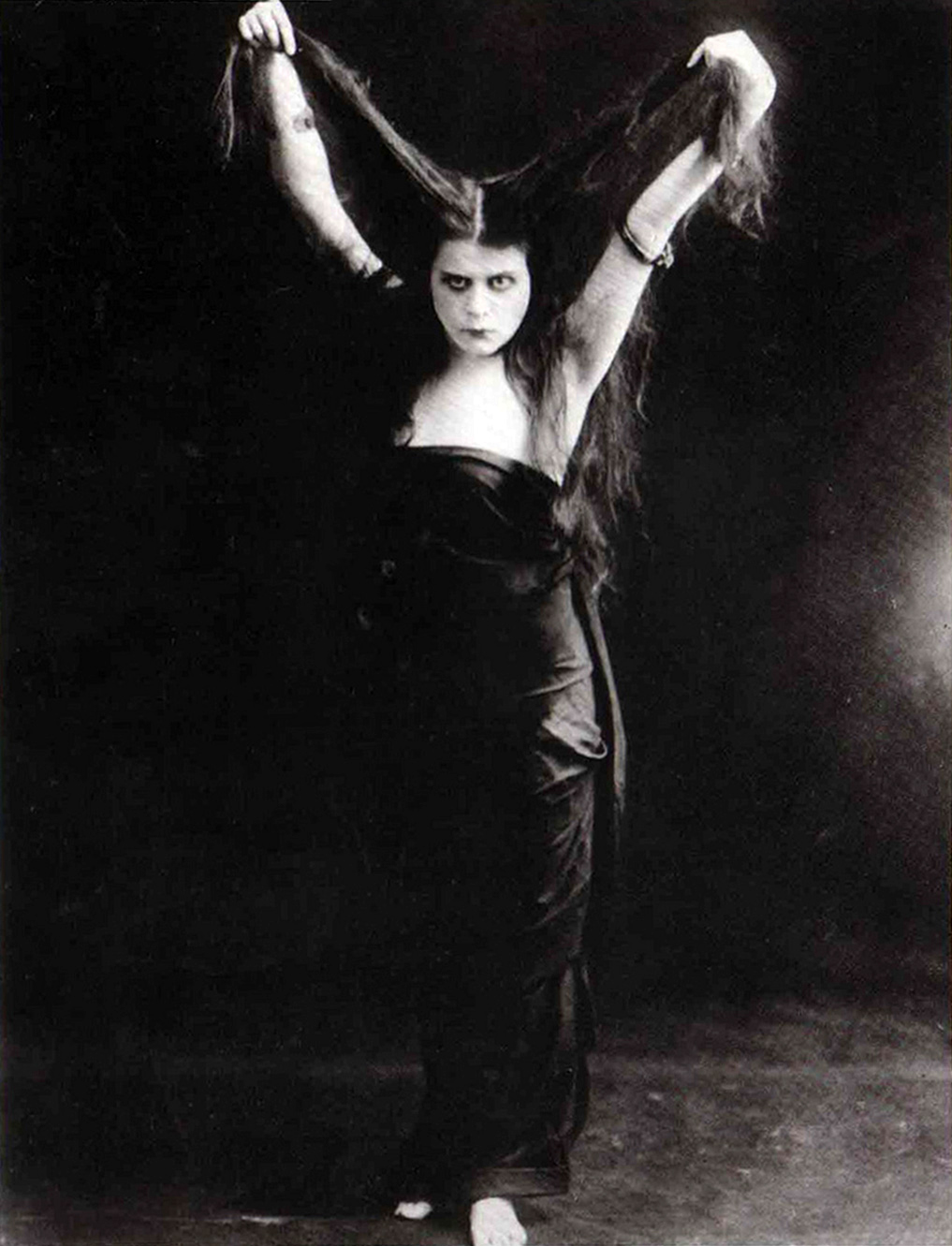
- Theda Bara, photograph by Jack Freulich
- Directed by: Herbert Brenon
- Written by: Herbert Brenon
- Story by: Herbert Brenon
- Starring: Theda Bara; William E. Shay
- Cinematography: Phil Rosen
- Distributed by: Fox Film Corporation
- Release date: October 3, 1915
- Running time: 50 minutes
- Country: United States
- Language: Silent (English intertitles)

Sin is a 1915 American silent drama film written and directed by Herbert Brenon and starring Theda Bara. It was produced by Fox Film Corporation and shot at the Fox Studio in Fort Lee, New Jersey. The film is now considered to be lost.

== Cast ==
- Theda Bara as Rosa
- William E. Shay as Luigi
- Warner Oland as Pietro
- Henry Leone as Giovanni
- Louise Rial as Maria

== Reception ==
In order to play on Theda Bara's image as a "vamp", Fox Film Corporation publicized the film with the tagline "Sin With Theda Bara!". Upon its release, Sin was an enormous hit with audiences, and Bara earned generally good reviews for her performance. Despite its success in other locations, the film was banned in Ohio and Georgia for its themes of suicide, lust, Roman Catholic sacrilege, and love triangles. The Pittsburgh Board of Welfare condemned the film, as did the Kansas Board of Censorship, although the latter apparently still permitted screenings of the film in Kansas theaters.

== See also ==
- List of lost films
- 1937 Fox vault fire
- List of Fox Film films
