= A Pasteboard Crown =

1922 silent film

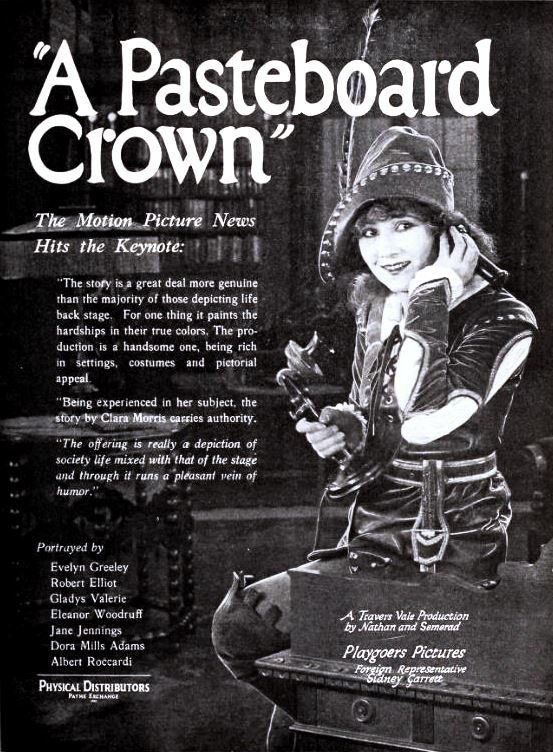
- Directed by: Travers Vale
- Written by: Thomas F. Fallon; Clara Morris
- Produced by: Travers Vale
- Starring: Evelyn Greeley; Robert Elliott; Gladys Valerie
- Cinematography: Jacques Bizeul
- Production companies: Nathan & Semerad Productions; Travers Vale Productions
- Distributed by: Playgoers Pictures
- Release date: April 16, 1922
- Running time: 50 minutes
- Country: United States
- Languages: Silent; English intertitles

A Pasteboard Crown is a 1922 American silent drama film directed by Travers Vale and starring Evelyn Greeley, Robert Elliott and Gladys Valerie.

== Cast ==
- Evelyn Greeley as Sybil Lawton
- Robert Elliott as Stewart Thrall
- Gladys Valerie as Edna Thrall
- Eleanor Woodruff as Cora Manice
- Jane Jennings as Mrs. Lawton
- Dora Mills Adams as Claire Morrell
- Albert Roccardi as William Buckley

== Bibliography ==
- Munden, Kenneth White. The American Film Institute Catalog of Motion Pictures Produced in the United States, Part 1. University of California Press, 1997.
