= Ada Rehan =

19th/20th-century American actress

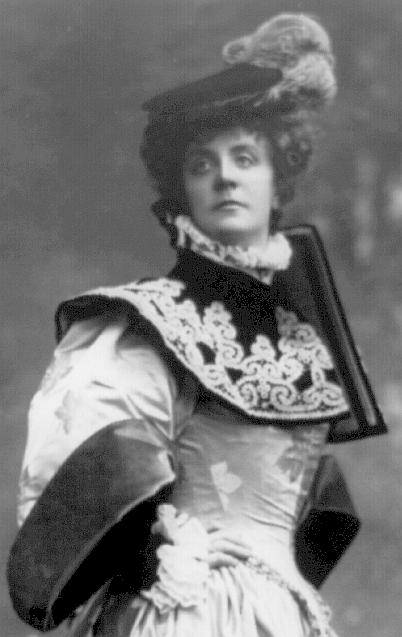
- Ada Rehan in 1897
- Born: Bidelia Crehan; April 22, 1857; County Limerick, Ireland
- Died: January 8, 1916 (aged 58); New York City
- Occupation: Actress
- Relatives: Arthur Byron (nephew)

Ada Rehan (born Bidelia Crehan; April 22, 1857 – January 8, 1916) was an American actress and comedian who typified the "personality" style of acting in the nineteenth century.

== Early life and career ==
She was born Bidelia Crehan in Limerick city, Ireland, one of five siblings born to Thomas Crehan (died 1890) and Harriet (or Harriett) Ryan Crehan (died 1901). She was baptised in St Michael's Roman Catholic Church on 12 June 1857. Although by the time she applied for a U.S. passport, she had shaved a few years off and gave 1860 as her year of birth. The family surname was apparently changed to Rehan later. When she was a small child, her family emigrated to the United States and settled in Brooklyn, New York. Her year of birth was later disputed by a critic who wrote in the Boston Globe on November 24, 1888, when she should have been 31 years old (or 28 by her own reckoning later), "Ada Rehan is forty years old and over. She makes up fairly for girlish roles ... but at close sight in the cold light of day she shows her age."

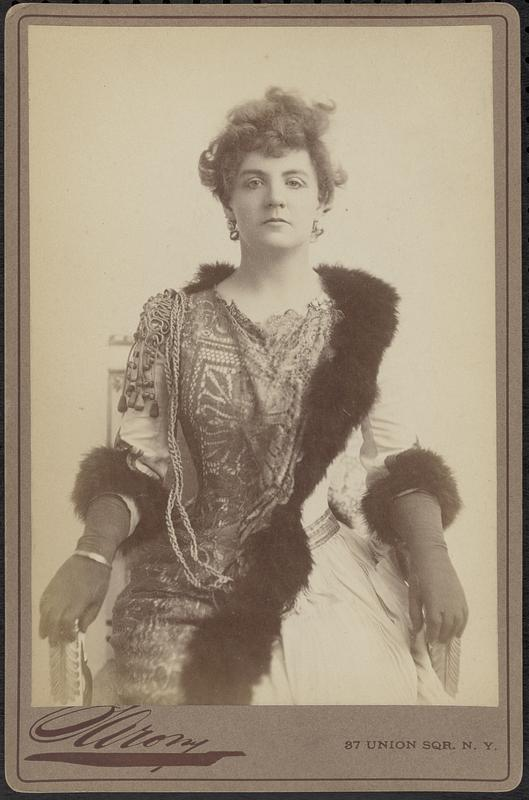
Ada Rehan as Baroness Vera in "The Last Word,” ca. 1890–1891; from the Cabinet Card Collection of the Boston Public Library

Ada's siblings found work in the theatre. Her sisters Harriet and Kate preceded her onto the stage. Kate married fellow actor Oliver Doud Byron. Their son, Ada's nephew, was actor Arthur Byron. Ada's two brothers, William and Arthur, were involved with the business side of theatre. Her first performance was in Newark, New Jersey, in a play called Across the Continent, written by her brother-in-law, in which she filled in for an actress in a minor role who was sick and unable to go on. Her appearance was competent enough that her family decided she should continue pursuing a career in the theatre. It was in her next performance, with Mrs. John Drew's Arch Street Theatre of Philadelphia, that she was miscalled as Ada C. Rehan and the name stuck. Ada then went to Louisville to join the stock company of Macauley's Theatre, where she remained one season (1875–76). Subsequently, she appeared in Baltimore, Albany, and other cities with John W. Albaugh's company and played supporting roles alongside prominent actors like Edwin Booth and John Edward McCullough.

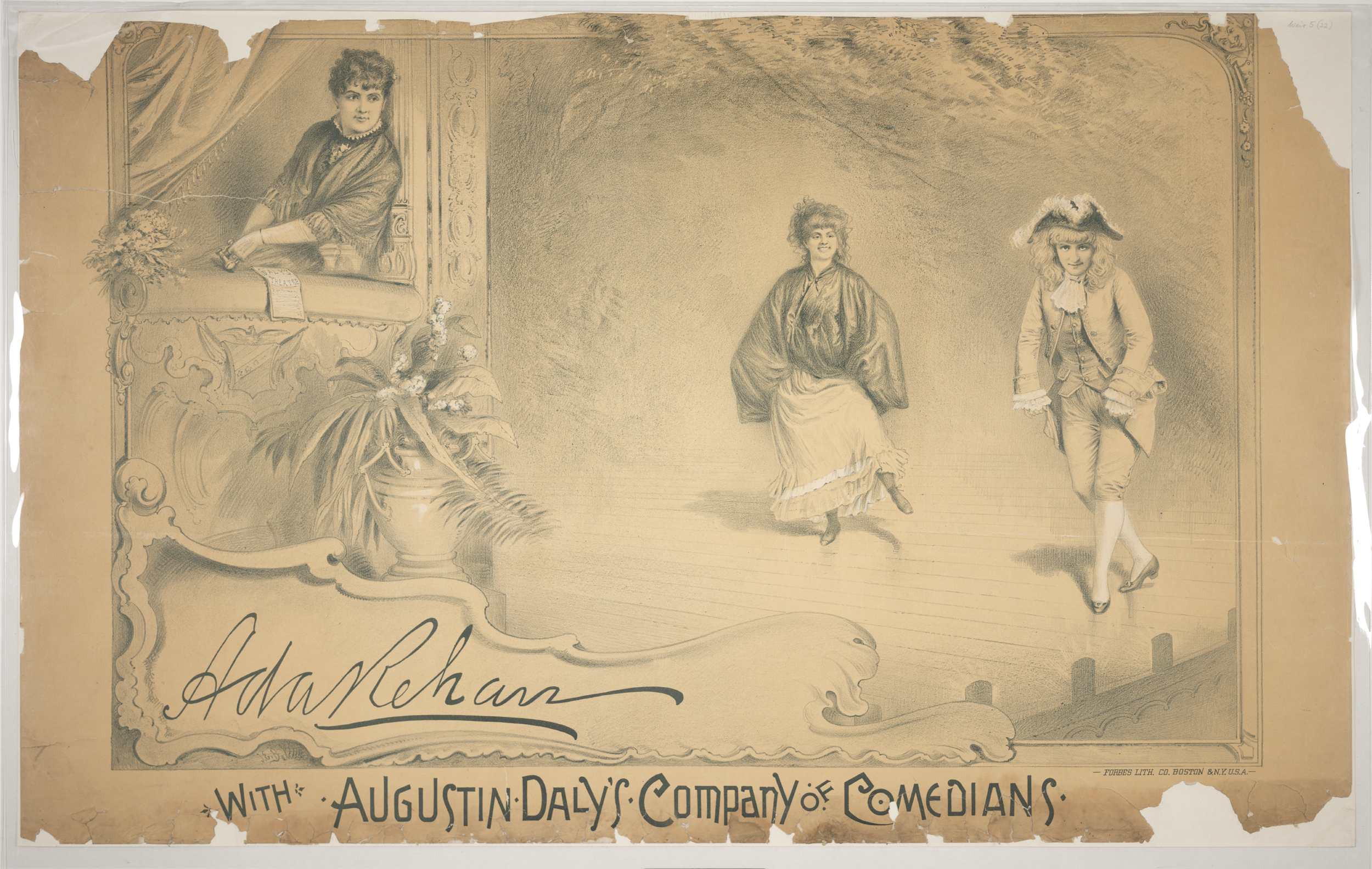
Rehan's autograph on a theatre poster

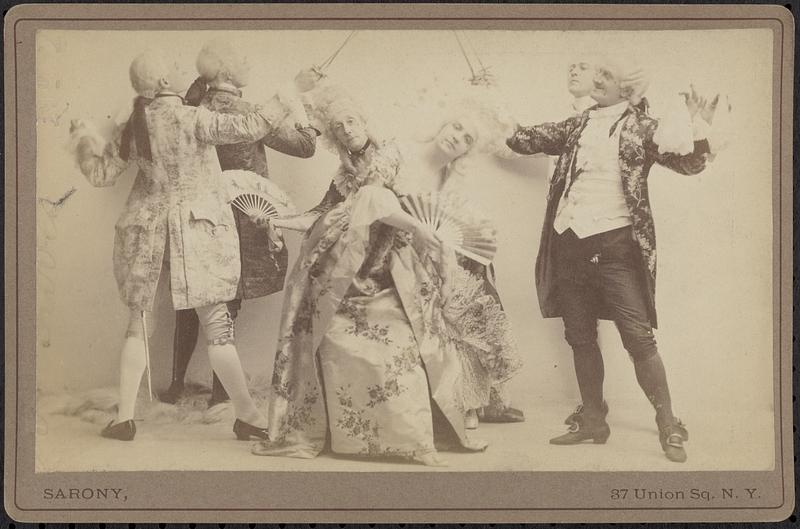
A scene from "The School for Scandal" with Ada Rehan and Anne Hartley Gilbert, ca. 1891–1895. Cabinet Card Collection, Boston Public Library

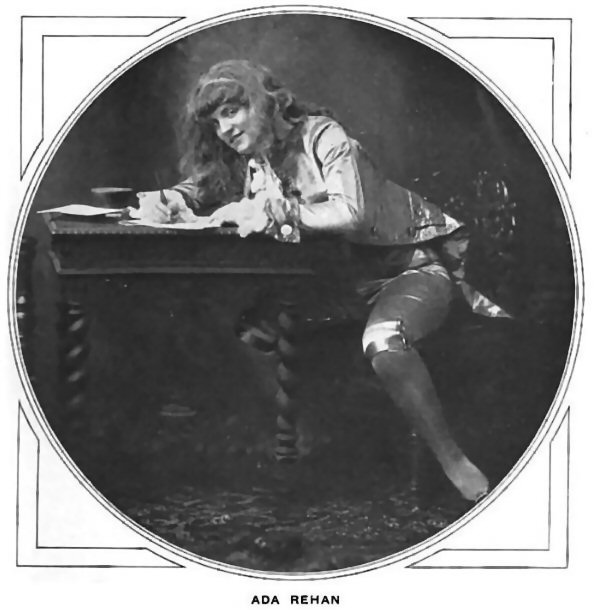
Ada Rehan

== Fame and Augustin Daly ==
Rehan was performing in one of Daly's own plays, Pique, produced by New York's Grand Opera House and starring Fanny Davenport when the successful theatre manager Augustin Daly first took note of her in April 1879. Later that year, when he opened his third New York theatre, Daly's Fifth Avenue Theatre, Rehan joined his company. Rehan would continue to work with Daly until his death twenty years later, but their relationship, though marked by enormous professional success for both, was a turbulent one.

Rehan was part of Daly's company, known as the "Big Four", John Drew, Jr., Mrs. Ann Hartley Gilbert, and James Lewis made the rest of the group. Under Daly's meticulous direction and management, the foursome won over critics and audiences with their specialities of Shakespearean comedies, Restoration comedies, and translations of German farces. In general, the four leads played variations on the same character types. Drew and Rehan were slotted in to the romantic hero and heroine roles, while Lewis and Gilbert took the older, character roles. As one reporter at the Herald described it, "They have one way of playing comedy at Daly's and only one. Whether the piece be Sheridan's or Shakespeare's or Schonthan's or Jerome's, the actors are always good, bright, middle-class Americans." While finding much success in "breeches roles", for her audiences in America and abroad she came to embody an ideal of femininity that was desirable, respectable, and aspirational. In his biography of her, one of Rehan's contemporaries, William Winter wrote "Each part that she has undertaken has been permeated with something of herself... Her soul is given to her profession, and the nature of the woman herself is discerned in that of the character that she represents." It soon became clear that Rehan was the star of Daly's company even within the Big Four, but Daly refused to acknowledge this with top billing or any other prioritizing treatment.

Rehan and Daly's professional relationship was further complicated by their personal one. It is generally acknowledged that Rehan became the married Daly's mistress early on in their partnership. Cornelia Otis Skinner writes of their relationship that "besides being leading lady, [she] enjoyed the offstage role of grand maitresse... To hold the whip handle by keeping a woman of her beauty and prominence in the compromising position and extra-marital liaison involved in those cautious times was a sop to his will to power." Their romantic entanglement coupled with their professional symbiosis makes it easy to interpret their relationship as Svengali-esque.

Daly and Rehan's greatest achievement, and the production that most reflected their own combative power dynamics, was most likely their 1887 The Taming of the Shrew. It ran in both New York and London and that initial run tallied 121 performances, which was quite a feat for a show in the nineteenth century.

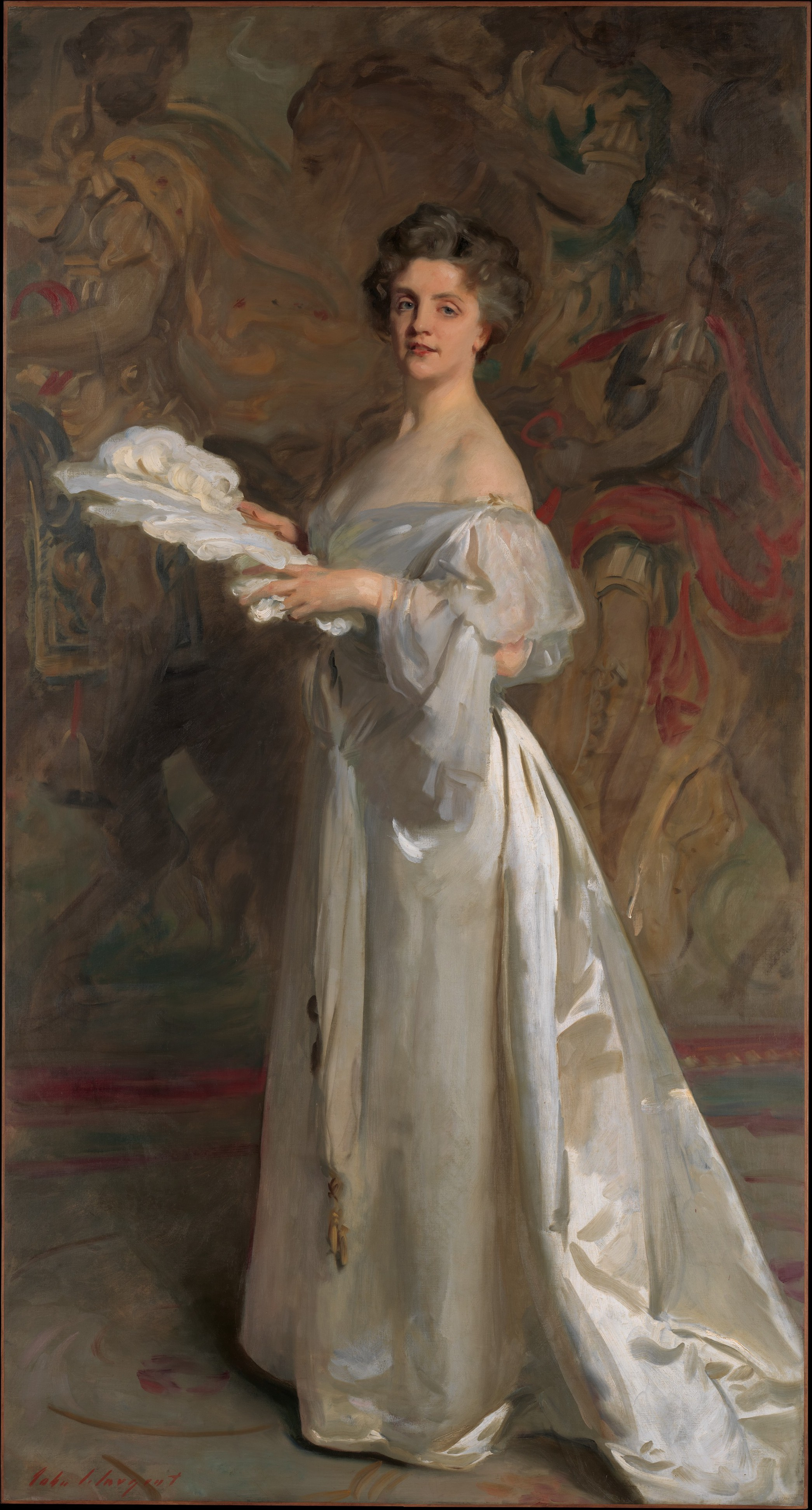
John Singer Sargent's 1895 portrait of Ada Rehan from The Met collection

Rehan was so popular in the 1880s and '90s that she played over 200 parts. George Bernard Shaw, Mark Twain, and Oscar Wilde (who wrote the part of Mrs. Erlynne in Lady Windermere's Fan with her in mind) were among her many admirers. And women everywhere strove to imitate her diction, demeanor, and even her dresses. The Chicago Evening Mail reported on the fad of women impersonating Rehan's speech, ladies' hats were named for her, and dressmakers offered her costumes for free in order to get their designs in front of the public.

== Retirement ==
When Augustin Daly died in 1899, Rehan deserted the stage for an entire year. She returned with a production of Sweet Nell of Old Drury and a tour that revived some of her classic roles from her career with Daly's company. However, the staleness that Rehan's performances had become susceptible to as the 1890s wore on was even more evident in these post-Daly productions.

In a letter to William Winter, Rehan wrote, "I am very indifferent toward the future. If I ever go on again with my work, I fear it will be more of the machine than the artiste." After a few more poorly received attempts, Rehan permanently retired from the stage in 1905.

== Death ==
Rehan lived out her remaining years between her homes in New York and the English coast. She died from arteriosclerosis and cancer at Roosevelt Hospital in New York in 1916. Her ashes are buried in Greenwood Cemetery, Brooklyn.

== Legacy ==
Ada Rehan was widely admired in both America and Europe, having acted in Paris, Berlin, Hamburg, London, Edinburgh, Dublin, and Stratford-on-Avon. When she died newspapers across the country mourned her death, including a prominent obituary in The New York Times.

Daly modelled the masthead of his theatre, a depiction of Comedy, after Rehan.

Rehan was the model for a solid silver statue of Justice that was presented as part of the State of Montana's mining exhibition at the World's Columbian Exposition in Chicago in 1893. The statue was later melted down for bullion in 1903. More than 25 years after Ada Rehan's death, a World War II Liberty ship was named after her, the USS Ada Rehan.

== Roles ==
- Beatrice in Much Ado About Nothing
- Rosalind in As You Like It
- Katherine in The Taming of the Shrew
- Viola in Twelfth Night
- Lady Teazle in The School for Scandal
- Valentine Osprey in The Railroad of Love
- Peggy in The Country Girl
- Kate Verity in The Squire
- Nancy Brasher in Nancy and Company
- Maid Marian in Tennyson's Foresters
- Roxanne in Daly's presentation of Cyrano de Bergerac
- Portia in The Merchant of Venice
- Helen in Daly's presentation of "Midsummer Night's Dream"

She also played the principal female characters in:

- Cinderella at School
- Needles and Pins
- A Wooden Spoon
- After Business Hours
- Our English Friend
