= Arthur Byron =

American actor (1872–1943)

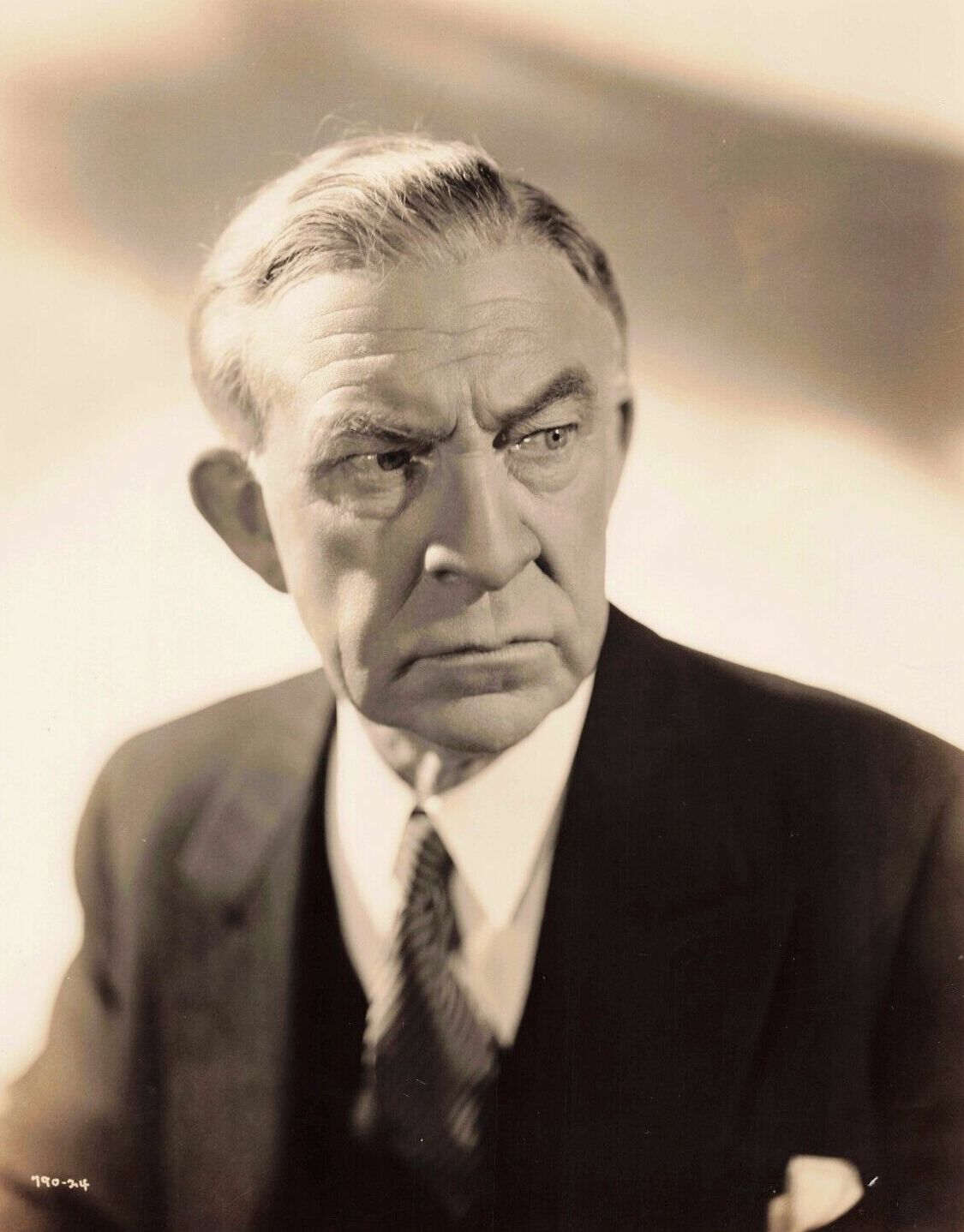
- Byron in The Casino Murder Case, 1935
- Born: Arthur William Byron; April 3, 1872; Brooklyn, New York, U.S.
- Died: July 16, 1943 (aged 71); Hollywood, California, U.S.
- Occupation: Film actor
- Years active: 1932–1937
- Spouse: Kathryn Keys
- Children: 3
- Father: Oliver Doud Byron
- Relatives: Ada Rehan (aunt)

4th President of the Actors' Equity Association
- In office 1938–1940
- Preceded by: Burgess Meredith (acting president)
- Succeeded by: Bert Lytell

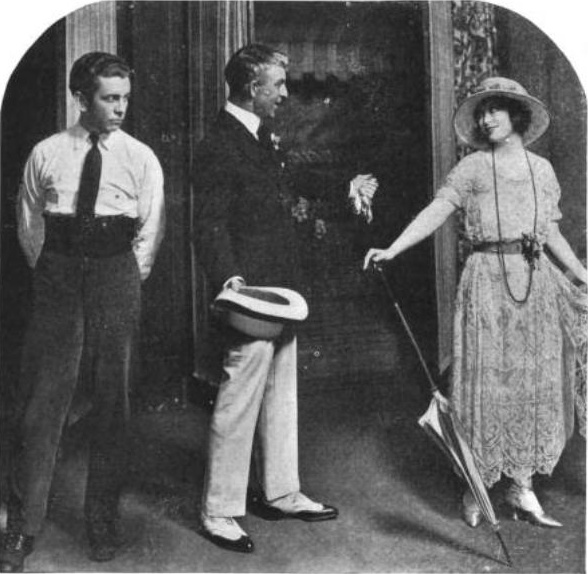
L-R: Richard Barbee, Arthur Byron, and Margaret Lawrence in the Broadway production of Transplanting Jean (1921)

Arthur William Byron (April 3, 1872 – July 16, 1943) was an American actor who played a mixture of British and American roles in films.

== Early years ==
Born in Brooklyn, Byron was the son of actors Kate Crehan and Oliver Doud Byron. He was a nephew of the stage actress Ada Rehan.

== Career ==
Byron started his theatrical career in February 1889 at the age of 17 with his father's dramatic company. In 1939 he celebrated his 50 years in showbusiness.

He appeared in more than 300 plays and played with stars like Maxine Elliott, Ethel Barrymore, John Gielgud, Katherine Cornell, Maude Adams and Minnie Maddern Fiske.

He was a founder and one-time president of The Actors' Equity Association (AEA) and a member of The Lambs and the Actor's fund of America. The Broadway producer and theatre critic Rita Hassan served as his executive assistant at the AEA.

Byron appeared many times at the Lakewood Playhouse in Maine.

== Personal life and death ==
Byron was married to Kathryn Keyes, and they had two daughters and a son. He died of a heart ailment, from which he suffered for some years, in Hollywood in 1943. He was cremated after his funeral service at Forest Lawn Memorial Park (Glendale) in its Wee Kirk Chapel. His family sent his ashes to the Byron summer home in Maine.

== Selected filmography ==
- Nervy Nat Kisses the Bride (1904, Edison)
- Fast Life (1932) - John D. Jameson
- The Mummy (1932) - Sir Joseph Whemple
- 20,000 Years in Sing Sing (1932) - Warden Paul Long
- Gabriel Over the White House (1933) - Jasper Brooks - Secretary of State
- The Silk Express (1933) - Conductor Clark
- Private Detective 62 (1933) - Tracey (uncredited)
- The Mayor of Hell (1933) - Judge Gilbert
- College Coach (1933) - Dr. Phillip Sargent
- Two Alone (1934) - Slag
- The House of Rothschild (1934) - Baring
- Stand Up and Cheer! (1934) - John Harly
- Fog Over Frisco (1934) - Everett Bradford
- The Notorious Sophie Lang (1934) - Police Insp. Stone
- The Man with Two Faces (1934) - Dr. Kendall
- That's Gratitude (1934) - Thomas Maxwell
- Marie Galante (1934) - Gen. Gerald Phillips
- The President Vanishes (1934) - President Craig Stanley
- The Secret Bride (1934) - Governor W.H. Vincent
- Shadow of Doubt (1935) - Morgan Bellwood
- The Whole Town's Talking (1935) - Spencer
- The Casino Murder Case (1935) - Richard Kinkaid
- Murder in the Fleet (1935) - Capt. John Winslow
- Oil for the Lamps of China (1935) - No. 1 Boss
- The Prisoner of Shark Island (1936) - Mr. Erickson
- The Prisoner of Zenda (1937) - (scenes deleted) (final film role)
