= Easy Money (1917 film) =

1917 film directed by Travers Vale

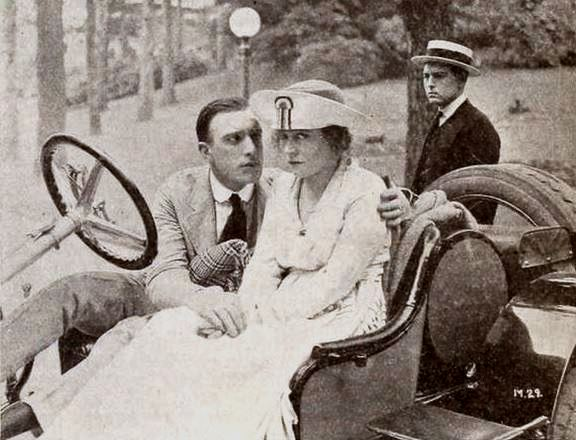
- Directed by: Travers Vale
- Written by: Gladys Johnson
- Produced by: William A. Brady
- Starring: Ethel Clayton; John Bowers; Frank Mayo
- Cinematography: Max Schneider
- Production company: Peerless Productions
- Distributed by: World Film
- Release date: November 12, 1917
- Running time: 63 minutes (5 reels)
- Country: United States
- Languages: Silent; English intertitles

Easy Money is a 1917 American silent drama film directed by Travers Vale and starring Ethel Clayton, John Bowers and Frank Mayo. It was shot at World Film's Fort Lee studios in New Jersey.

An impoverished art student becomes married in-name-only to a man who stands to inherit a large fortune.

== Plot ==
Lois Page, is ambitious to become a sculptor, but her uncle sends her a letter notifying her that he cannot continue to pay for her schooling. At that moment, her art instructor invites her to Richard Chanslor's party, where the wealthy young man becomes infatuated with Lois. He is to inherit a fortune from his grandfather when he marries, and proposes to an opera singer. Grandfather will not accept the lady as his grandson's wife, and disinherits him. Richard learns Lois' story and, recognizing that her beauty and temperament will please his grandfather, proposes that they become married in name only. By this plan, Richard will secure his fortune and Lois her education.

Lois consents, but struggles to keep the ruse up, as the actress and her art instructor insert themselves back into their lives. Richard's alcoholism makes him forget himself and he tries to express his attraction in improper ways. His attentions drive Lois away from him and she contacts her art instructor, who lures Lois to a secluded roadhouse. Her husband has tracked them down and steps in at the nick of time to save Lois from an assault, and afterwards, they are overjoyed to learn that they have learned to love one another.

== Cast ==
- Ethel Clayton as Lois Page
- John Bowers as Richard Chanslor
- Frank Mayo as Robert Hildreth
- Louise Vale as Lily Lorraine
- Jack Drumier as Peter K. Chanslor
- Charles Morgan as Sidney McCall
- Eugenie Woodward

== Reception ==
Moving Picture World reviewer Edward Weitzel gave the film a positive review, praising the acting of the whole cast, and found the story interesting despite it not being "particularly novel."

Photoplay's review was negative, describing the World Film as having "committed one of its regular melodramas."

Wid's Films published a mixed review of the film, where they described the whole production as being "somewhat short on atmospheric beauty" as there were very few exteriors and the camera work was "just straight stuff." There was criticism leveled at an unintentionally hilarious scene where Lois Page struggles with the windows and doors after being locked inside, but her husband comes along and calmly opens the shutters that were previously locked. The reviewer found the characters likable and Ethel Clayton's acting to be "very pleasing."

== Bibliography ==
- Rita Ecke Altomara. Hollywood on the Palisades: a filmography of silent features made in Fort Lee, New Jersey, 1903-1927. Garland, 1983.
