= Darkest Russia (film) =

1917 American silent drama film

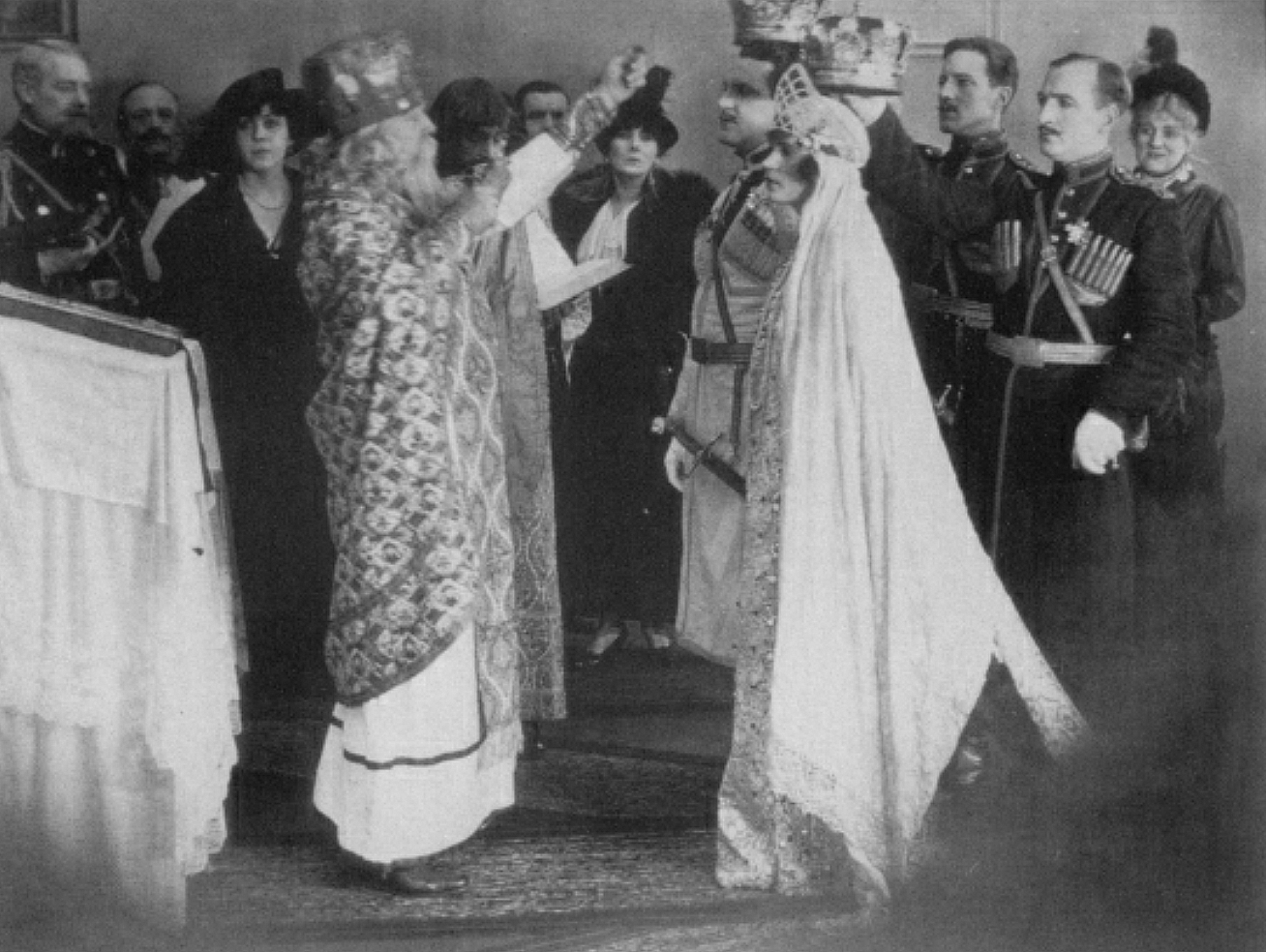
- Directed by: Travers Vale
- Written by: H. Grattan Donnelly (play); Sidney R. Ellis (play); Frances Marion
- Produced by: William A. Brady
- Starring: Alice Brady; John Bowers; J. Herbert Frank
- Cinematography: Max Schneider
- Production company: Peerless Productions
- Distributed by: World Film
- Release date: April 23, 1917
- Running time: 5 reels
- Country: United States
- Languages: Silent; English intertitles

Darkest Russia is a 1917 American silent drama film directed by Travers Vale and starring Alice Brady, John Bowers and J. Herbert Frank. In is based on the play Darkest Russia by H. Grattan Donnelly and Sidney R. Ellis.

== Cast ==
- Alice Brady as Ilda Barosky
- John Bowers as Alexis Nazimoff
- J. Herbert Frank as Constantine Karischeff
- Norbert Wicki as Ivan Barosky
- Jack Drumier as Count Paul Nazimoff
- Kate Lester as Katherine Karischeff
- Lillian Cook as Olga
- Frank DeVernon as Grand Duke
- Boris Korlin as Barosky
- Herbert Barrington as Nicholai

== Bibliography ==
- Goble, Alan. The Complete Index to Literary Sources in Film. Walter de Gruyter, 1999.
