= Marie, Ltd. =

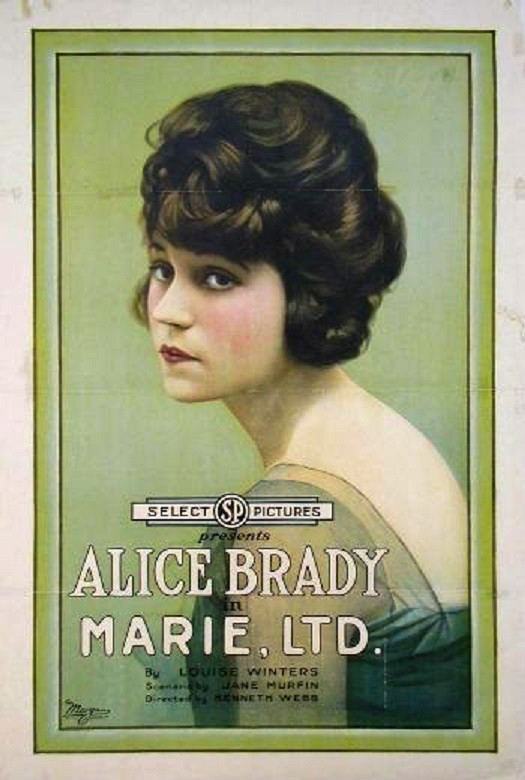
- Marie Ltd poster
- Directed by: Kenneth Webb
- Written by: Jane Murfin
- Based on: story by Louise Winter
- Produced by: Select Pictures Corporation
- Starring: Alice Brady
- Cinematography: Al Liguori
- Distributed by: Select Pictures Corporation
- Release date: March 23, 1919
- Running time: 5 reels
- Country: United States
- Language: Silent (English intertitles)

Marie, Ltd. is a 1919 American silent romantic comedy film directed by Kenneth S. Webb and starring Alice Brady. It was produced and distributed by the Select Pictures Corporation.

This film survives in the Archives Du Film Fu CNC, Bois d'Arcy, Paris.

== Cast ==
- Alice Brady - Drina Hilliard
- Frank Losee - Colonel Lambert
- Leslie Austin - Blair Carson
- Mrs. Gertrude Hillman - Marie Hilliard
- Josephine Whittell - Adelaide
- Gladys Valerie - Zelie
