= New York Avenue =

New York Avenue may refer to:

== Places ==
- New York Avenue (Washington, D.C.)
  - NoMa–Gallaudet U station, formerly known as New York Ave-Florida Ave
- New York Avenue (LIRR station) or Union Hall Street, a station on the Long Island Rail Road's Main Line at Union Hall Street at York College in Jamaica, Queens, New York City
- New York Avenue, an avenue in Brooklyn, New York City to which the Nostrand Avenue Line runs parallel
- New York Avenue, an avenue in western Suffolk County, New York, much of which is part of New York State Route 110
- East New York Avenue, a continuation of Jamaica Avenue in the East New York neighborhood of Brooklyn, New York City

== Games ==
- New York Avenue, an orange-shaded property in many U.S. Monopoly game versions

== See also ==
- Streets of New York (disambiguation)
