= The Street of Tears =

1924 film

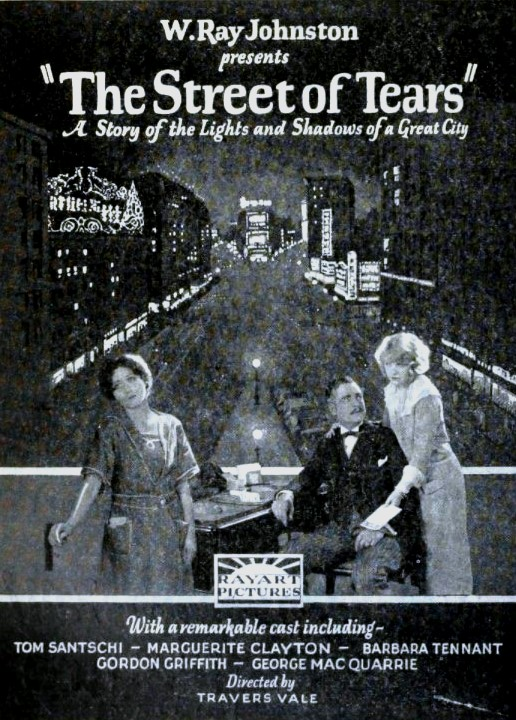
- Advertisement
- Directed by: Travers Vale
- Starring: Tom Santschi; Marguerite Clayton; Gordon Griffith
- Cinematography: Travers Vale
- Production company: Rayart Pictures
- Distributed by: Rayart Pictures
- Release date: October 1, 1924
- Running time: 5 reels
- Country: United States
- Language: Silent (English intertitles)

The Street of Tears is a 1924 American silent drama film directed by Travers Vale and starring Tom Santschi, Marguerite Clayton, and Gordon Griffith.

== Cast ==
- Tom Santschi as Jim Carlson
- Marguerite Clayton as Betty Blair
- Gordon Griffith as Ted Weller
- Barbara Tennant as Mary Weller
- George MacQuarrie as Dan Weller
- Mamie Ryan as Charlotte Morgan

== Preservation ==
With no prints of The Street of Tears located in any film archives, it is a lost film.

== Bibliography ==
- Munden, Kenneth White. The American Film Institute Catalog of Motion Pictures Produced in the United States, Part 1. University of California Press, 1997.
