= The Secret Bride =

1934 film by William Dieterle

- Theatrical release poster
- Directed by: William Dieterle
- Screenplay by: Tom Buckingham; F. Hugh Herbert; Mary C. McCall, Jr.
- Based on: Concealment; 1930 play by Leonard Ide
- Produced by: Henry Blanke
- Starring: Barbara Stanwyck; Warren William; Glenda Farrell; Grant Mitchell
- Cinematography: Ernest Haller
- Edited by: Owen Marks
- Music by: Bernhard Kaun
- Production company: Warner Bros. Pictures
- Release date: December 22, 1934
- Running time: 64 minutes
- Country: United States
- Language: English

The Secret Bride is a 1934 American drama film directed by William Dieterle and starring Barbara Stanwyck and Warren William. Based on the play Concealment by Leonard Ide, the film is about the attorney general of an unnamed state and the daughter of the governor who are forced to keep their recent elopement secret after the governor is accused of a crime. The initial plot concerns the governor taking a bribe in exchange for pardoning a white collar criminal. The investigation is about political corruption.

== Plot ==
Attorney General Robert Sheldon and Ruth, the daughter of Governor W.H. Vincent have to keep their marriage a secret when investigator, Daniel Breeden, uncovers evidence that may show that the governor took a bribe from John F. Holdstock, an embezzling financier he pardoned. John's private secretary, Willis Martin, who deposited the bribe money in the governor's private bank account, tells Robert and Daniel that he knows of no business between John and the governor that would explain the money.

Sheldon goes to the Governor's Residence to tell Ruth about the situation, and that he is obligated to present the evidence to a legislative investigation committee. Ruth is certain that her father did not take a bribe, and that John can explain everything, but they learn by phone from Daniel that John has committed suicide.

The Governor is concerned about the allegations, but his financial backer, Jim Lansdale, calms him down, and takes him to lunch. Before he does he makes a phone call in which he learns that Sheldon is at the Governor's residence, but he does not tell the Governor this.

In John's papers, Robert finds a typed note which apparently provides a motive for the bribe: "My dear friend John ... the expense of maintaining my sockfarm has exceeded the income during the year ... the time for the matter we discussed has come. W.H.V." Robert rushes to show it to Ruth, and they decide to take it to police headquarters to be compared with a sample from the governor's personal typewriter. Lt. Tom Nigard shows them the comparison: both samples are definitely from the same machine. Ruth returns home to tell her father about the evidence, and he adamantly denies that he wrote the note, giving her his word of honor.

That night, Daniel goes to John's office, where a very spooked Willis is still working. Daniel tries to calm him down, telling him "You have nothing to worry about, it's almost over. I've seen you through today as I promised, haven't I? ... You were splendid today in Robert's office. You just stick to your story and remember that I'm taking care of you."

Ruth goes to Robert's apartment to tell him that she's absolutely certain her father is innocent. While she is there, Sheldon's secretary, Hazel Normandie leaves for the day, planning to meet Daniel, her boyfriend, outside the building. As he walks up to her, Daniel is shot dead. Ruth has seen everything from the window, and knows that Hazel didn't fire the shot, but cannot tell the police because of her secret marriage to Robert: if it was learned that she was in his apartment at night, she fears that their marriage will be discovered.

The police investigation of Daniel's murder determines that the gun used to kill him belonged to Hazel, the same gun that Daniel took from her earlier in the day, saying that he was all the protection she needed.

At a raucous session of the legislature, Representative McPherson, from the party opposing the Governor, accuses both the governor and Attorney General Sheldon of withholding evidence from the investigative committee. They are staunchly defended by Representative Grosvenor, but McPherson demands articles of impeachment against the governor and intensive investigation of Robert. Ruth observes it all from the gallery.

Hazel is standing trial for the murder of Daniel, with the case about to go to the jury, but Ruth still refuses to testify, knowing that the revelation of her secret marriage with Robert would end his career. With little time to waste, Ruth goes to the apartment of Willis, who appears to be cracking up. Willis admits to her that John didn't commit suicide, he was murdered, and says that he is willing to tell Robert so, but once at Robert's office he runs away; Sheldon puts out an alert for the police to pick him up. Now, with no other choice, he and Ruth head to the courthouse, where the jury is voting, and find Hazel's attorney. The judge reopens the case to allow Ruth to testify, and Hazel is acquitted.

The next morning, Governor Vincent is annoyed that Ruth didn't tell him about the marriage, but understands that the circumstances necessitated it. With the governor's impeachment trial due to start soon, Jim Lansdale counsels the governor to resign, but he refuses. Meanwhile, the legislature demands that Attorney General Sheldon resign, but he, too, refuses.

The police find Willis and bring him to Robert. Representative McPherson issues subpoenas for Willis and Robert to testify before the committee, where the existence of the typed letter apparently from the governor to John comes out. Willis admits that Daniel made him put the letter into John's files, and then sent him to John to demand the money he lost in John's crash. When John denied he had any money, Willis shot and killed him, and Daniel fixed it to look like suicide. The whole frame-up, according to Willia, is the work of Jim Lansdale, supposedly the governor's friend and financial backer: ever since the governor vetoed a highway bill that would have made him millions, Lansdale had been working to bring down his old friend. It was Lansdale who typed the letter on the typewriter in the governor's study.

As the committee votes to drop the charges against the governor, Lansdale slowly leaves the room and kills himself. Afterwards, the governor gives his blessing to the marriage of his daughter and Robert, and they kiss.

== Cast ==
- Barbara Stanwyck as Ruth Vincent
- Warren William as Robert Sheldon
- Glenda Farrell as Hazel Normandie
- Grant Mitchell as Willis Martin
- Arthur Byron as Governor W. H. Vincent
- Henry O'Neill as Jim Lansdale
- Douglass Dumbrille as Daniel Breeden
- Arthur Aylesworth as Lt. Tom Nigard
- Willard Robertson as Representative Grosvenor
- William Davidson as Representative McPherson

== Production ==
Working titles for The Secret Bride were "Concealment" and "His Secret Bride". Director William Dieterle was not happy about the project, which he had to do for contractual reasons: he thought the script was poor, and wondered why Stanwyck hadn't rejected it - but Stanwyck wanted out of her contract with Warner Bros. as quickly as possible; she made only one more film for them, 1935's The Woman in Red, until she returned in 1941 to make Meet John Doe for Frank Capra. Despite Dieterle's dislike of the film, it shows his strong directorial hand, with the use of low camera angles and fast editing to give the film good rhythm and pace.

== Reception ==
The Secret Bride was released before Christmas in 1934, but did not play on a large number of screens.
