= Woodcliff, New Jersey =

Woodcliff, New Jersey may refer to the following places in the United States:

- Woodcliff, North Bergen, a neighborhood
- Woodcliff Lake, New Jersey, formerly Borough of Woodcliff
