= The Poor of New York =

1857 stage play by Dion Boucicault

The Poor of New York, also known as The Streets of New York, is a melodrama in five acts written by Dion Boucicault, adapted from the French play Les Pauvres de Paris which was written by Edouard-Louis-Alexandre Brisbarre and Eugene Nus. It premiered at Wallack's Lyceum Theatre, of which Boucicault was the General Director, on December 8, 1857.

The piece revolves around the efforts of a middle-class family, newly impoverished by the financial panic of 1857, to survive against a villainous banker. It was an immediate success and Boucicault went on to present it throughout Europe, changing locations and the title to reflect the locales it was playing. The play has been adapted multiple times into films and musicals under the name The Streets of New York.

== Characters ==
- Captain Fairweather – Father and husband to the Fairweathers, dies in Act I leaving his money in the hands of,
- Gideon Bloodgood – Banker; everything he commits he does for the love of his daughter,
- Alida Bloodgood – Spoiled, above all else she desires to be admitted to high society and in order to do so attempts to buy the hand of,
- Mark Livingstone – Born into society, but has lost all his wealth; in love with the sister of,
- Paul Fairweather – Son of Capt. Fairweather, impoverished clerk, looking for work so that he can support,
- Mrs. Fairweather – Wife of Capt. Fairweather, willing to commit suicide to ease the burden of Paul and,
- Lucy Fairweather – Beloved of Livingstone, but willing to renounce her love so that he might regain his wealth.
- The Puffys – Father, Mother, and son Dan. Puffy is a baker who has lost everything in the crash yet still attempts to help his lodgers, the Fairweathers
- Badger – A villainous clerk of Bloodgood's who undergoes a change of heart between Acts IV and V and successfully resolves the action in favor of the Fairweathers.

== Plot ==
=== Act I: The financial panic of 1837. ===
Setting: The office of Gideon Bloodgood, bank owner. The act opens with Bloodgood preparing to abscond to England. He has been following the stock market and knows that his bank will collapse the following day. He reveals that he has done everything for his daughter's fortunes. Badger, a clerk in the bank, enters and successfully blackmails Bloodgood with the knowledge that Badger has been keeping an account of Bloodgood's dealings. Captain Fairweather enters and deposits his life savings with Bloodgood personally. Captain Fairweather has discovered that his previous bank was about to collapse and removed his money; he believes Bloodgood to be sound. He exits with a receipt for his deposit. The Captain returns demanding his money back: His ship's owners have filled him in on the rumors about Bloodgood's finances. Bloodgood refuses to return the money and in the heated discussion that follows the Captain dies of a heart attack. Badger helps Bloodgood dispose of the Captain's body and acquires the deposit slip. End Tableau: Bloodgood and Badger triumphant separately over the prostrate Captain.

=== Act II: The financial panic of 1857. ===
==== Scene 1 ====
Setting: The park near Tammany Hall.
Mark Livingstone explains how he has gone from a position of wealth and society to poverty and hunger. Puffy the baker enters selling sweet potatoes. He recognizes Livingstone as a former customer and explains how he has come down in the world due to the crash. He mentions his lodgers, the Fairweathers, and their fate in the crash. Livingstone reveals that he knows the Fairweathers, particularly that he had feelings for Lucy. Mrs. Fairweather and her son Paul enter. Paul demands an account of Livingstone's actions given his interest in Lucy, and Livingstone is forced to reveal his poverty. Bloodgood enters, demanding rent from Puffy. All exit except for Livingstone who gives a rousing speech about how the true poor of New York are the newly impoverished middle class. He is forced to exit by the police.

==== Scene 2 ====
Setting: Exterior of Bloodgood's Bank, Nassau St.
Bloodgood recounts his crime, twenty years before to the day on that spot, and how the Captain's money secured his fortune. Alida Bloodgood enters, demanding money from her father for her lover's gambling debts. Bloodgood returns with Puffy. Puffy offers Bloodgood the note Mrs. Fairweather has given him in lieu of paying his rent. Bloodgood exults that he now has two sources to extort.

==== Scene 3 ====
Setting: The interior of Puffy's house.
Mrs. Fairweather and Lucy Fairweather are setting the table for dinner in expectation of Livingstone visiting. Mrs. Puffy and her son Dan enter and help, adding to the food to be provided and offering to act as servants when Mrs. Fairweather insists they join in the meal. Livingstone and Paul Fairweather enter and the Puffys serve the meal. All are setting down to eat when sheriff's officers enter and demand payment of rent and Mrs. Fairweather's note. Livingstone reveals that he is unable to save his friends by making the payment for them. End Tableau.

=== Act III ===
Setting: The interior of Bloodgood's residence.
Bloodgood is writing at his desk; Alida is reading an account of Bloodgood in the New York Herald, describing him as a financial vulture. Alida reveals her desire to enter high society, which has so far snubbed her. Livingstone requests entrance which Bloodgood denies but Alida forces her father to accept. Livingstone asks for a loan and admits that he is ruined. Bloodgood refuses, but Alida forces him to restore Livingstone's fortune so that she might purchase him as a husband. Badger enters, announcing his return from California. Lucy Fairweather enters to work on Alida's dress. The ladies exit and Badger extorts Bloodgood for more money, revealing that he has the receipt. Paul Fairweather enters, requesting leniency in regard to his mother's note. Badger recognizes him as the true heir to Captain Fairweather's fortune. Bloodgood offers Paul a position in Rio de Janeiro to foil Badger's threat of informing the heirs of Captain Fairweather and calls for the police. Lucy attempts to leave and encounters Livingstone returning to receive Bloodgood's loan. Livingstone professes his love to Lucy. Alida overhears and informs Lucy that she intends to purchase Livingstone as a husband, and that without her aid Livingstone will be ruined. Livingstone enters acknowledging Alida as his benefactor, without whose aid he was planning to commit suicide. Lucy renounces her love for Livingstone. Badger, Bloodgood and the police enter. Badger is arrested but has hidden the receipt in his lodgings, foiling Bloodgood.

=== Act IV ===
==== Scene 1 ====
Setting: Union Square, snow falling.
Puffy is selling roasted chestnuts. Paul is crouched in a corner. Dan enters carrying luggage for a gentleman. Puffy and Dan converse about their fallen fortunes. Mrs. Puffy enters with their dinner. All three decide to give some to Paul, without recognizing him. He is sleeping and does not wake. Badger enters attempting to sell matches to a gentleman. Mrs. Fairweather enters determined to sell her wedding ring in order to provide food for her children. Badger takes her ring, but returns it and directs her to a saloon warning her not to show it to strangers. Bloodgood enters waiting for the end of an opera. Badger attempts to sell him an opera program before recognizing him. Bloodgood threatens him with a revolver but Badger disarms him with the threat of a knife that he knows how to use from the California gold fields (see the cowardly nature of melodramatic villains). Badger reveals that he has gotten out of prison, losing the Fairweathers to Bloodgood's machinations but keeping the receipt. Badger extorts Bloodgood with promise of a confession to the newspapers, and Bloodgood promises to bring money to Badger's lodgings in the Five Points neighborhood. Both exit. Mr. and Mrs. Puffy exit. Dan calls on Paul to help him with the luggage without recognizing him. Paul attempts to carry the trunk, but is too weak and the trunk is removed by a porter. Lucy and Mrs. Fairweather enter, both having failed to gain money either by work, selling the ring, or begging. They meet up with Paul and reveal the extent of their troubles. Paul sends them home promising to bring food.

==== Scene 2 ====
Setting: The Vestibule of the academy of music.
Alida and Livingstone enter. Alida revels in her triumph; Livingstone is bound to her father by debt and will marry her in one month, New York society now acknowledges her, and her lover still courts her to Livingstone's indifference. Paul enters looking for charity. Livingstone recognizes him and the two confer. Alida leaves for her lover's carriage. Livingstone tells Paul that he will aid the Fairweathers now that he has money, and gets their address, which turns out to be the same building that Badger is lodging in.

==== Scene 3 ====
Setting: Two adjoining attic rooms, 19 1/2 Cross St., the Five Points neighborhood.
Lucy and Mrs. Fairweather are in one room, Badger enters the other. Badger fantasizes about the money he will receive from Bloodgood, while Lucy and Mrs. Fairweather separately decide to commit suicide by asphyxiation from the charcoal burner they use to cook their food. The Fairweathers leave, each attempting to draw the other away from their suicide attempt. Bloodgood enters and threatens Badger with his pistol, but is disarmed by Badger who draws two large revolvers from concealment. Badger insists that Bloodgood return to his lodging with the money. The Fairweathers return. Mrs. Fairweather stops up the windows while Lucy returns with the brazier. The two realize that they share the same intent and state their reasons for suicide before succumbing to the lack of oxygen. Badger in the next room starts to feel the effects. Paul and Livingstone arrive and save Lucy and Mrs. Fairweather. Badger realizes that he is succumbing and hides the receipt. Paul hears his cries and enters his room at the same time as Bloodgood returns. Badger recognizes Paul and reveals to him that he has proof of Bloodgood's robbery, but passes out before he can retrieve the receipt.

=== Act V ===
==== Scene 1 ====
Setting: Brooklyn Heights, the garden of a cottage overlooking New York City and its harbor.
Mrs. Fairweather and Paul are seated at breakfast, being served by the Puffys. They converse about how Lucy is recovering and that Livingstone has set them up in their old home, found work for Paul and restored Puffy's bakery with a government contract. Livingstone has avoided visiting them because of Lucy's renunciation of their love. Badger enters, having nursed Lucy during her illness and now joining the police in a financial crimes unit. The receipt has not been recovered either by the Fairweathers or Bloodgood who has bought and locked up the building. Livingstone is to be married to Alida that night. Livingstone enters to say goodbye, and Badger reveals that Lucy in a fever confessed to refusing Livingstone's love so that he might regain his wealth. Livingstone and Lucy confirm their love. Dan enters, spying a fire in lower New York. He realizes that it is Badger's old lodgings. Badger determines that Bloodgood has set the fire to destroy the receipt and sets out to save the paper and the Fairweather's fortunes.

==== Scene 2 ====
Setting: The exterior of 19 1/2 Cross St. in Five Points.
Bloodgood is seen through the windows setting fires. He exits and locks the building. The fire is seen to spread. A crowd enters to watch. Badger enters and breaks into the building through a window. Dan attempts to follow him but returns, burned and overcome by the fire. The top of the building crumbles inwards and Badger is revealed in his old room. The building collapses further and Badger falls with it. Badger reappears in the ground floor and drags himself from the ruins, on fire. The crowd rescues him. End Tableau

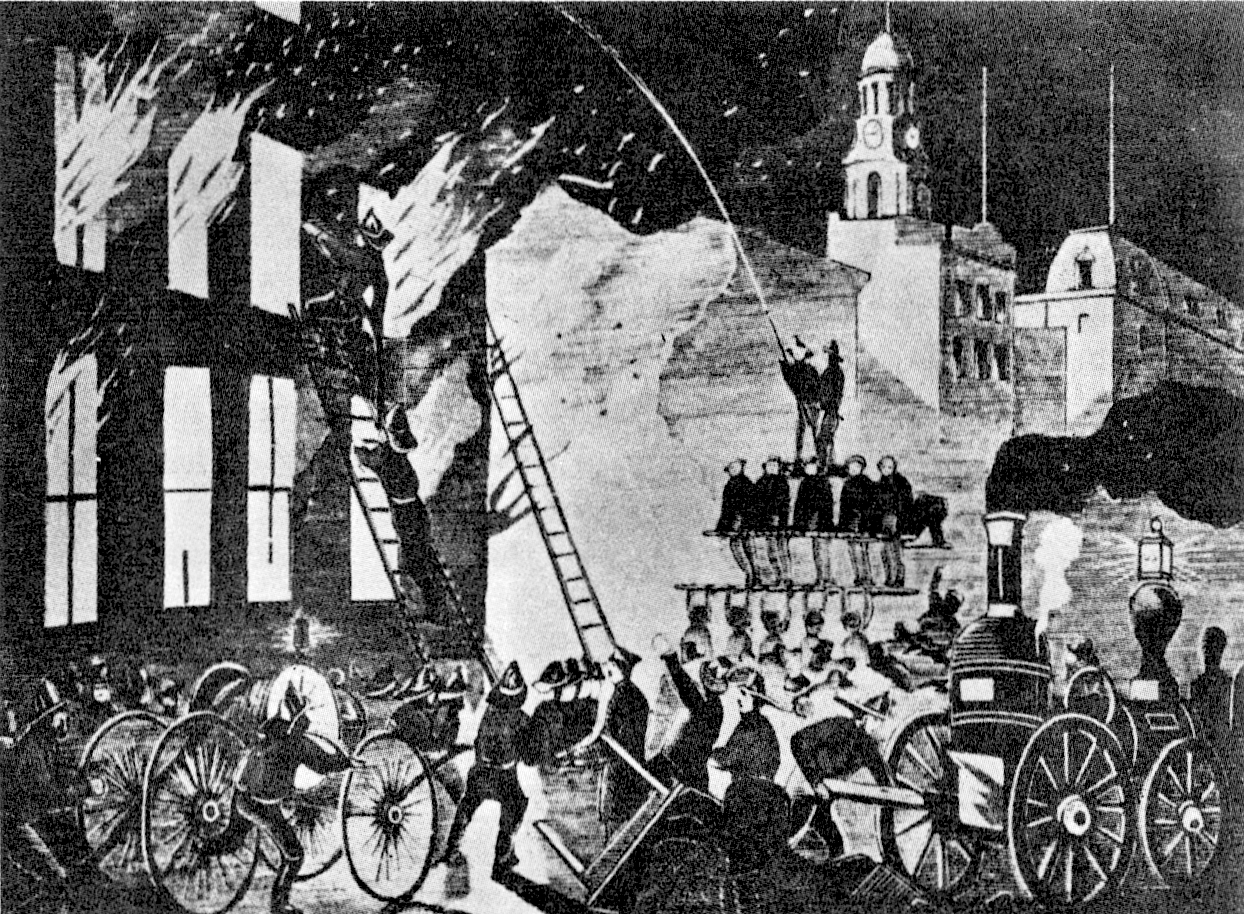
This illustration depicts the tenement fire spectacle from the melodrama, The Poor of New York, by Dion Boucicault, 1857. Act V, Sc. 2

==== Scene 3 ====
Setting: The Drawing room of the Bloodgood's Mansion on Madison Av.
Bloodgood enters, triumphant over the fire and destruction of the receipt. Alida enters dressed for the wedding. The wedding party is revealed. Livingstone enters and declines Alida's hand, presenting his reasons for the wedding, and Alida's letters to her lover as his reason for ending the engagement. Bloodgood reminds him of his debts, but the Fairweathers arrive and demand restitution of Captain Fairweather's money. Bloodgood calls for the police and Badger arrives. Bloodgood attempts to kill Badger with a knife but Badger disarms and arrests him. Alida in despair at her life denounces her father and leaves. Paul acknowledges Bloodgood's love of his daughter and forgives him, insisting only on reimbursement of his Father's money. Bloodgood leaves after his daughter. The Puffys are escorted in, afraid to enter so grand a residence. All prepare for the wedding of Livingstone and Lucy. The Fairweathers appeal to the audience to extend their hands to the poor of New York.

== The Act V Fire Spectacle ==
In Act V of The Poor of New York, a massive fire occurs. The fire spectacle includes the set being lit on fire, a real-life fire engine on the stage, and falling pieces of the set. This type of scenic design was the first of its kind. The sensational fire scene, ingeniously staged, set a precedent for all subsequent "sensation scenes".

The set is described as a house that is separated into thirds that are joined in a zigzag line, and dropped in succession to create the illusion of the falling roof and wall. To generate fire and flames, a chemical red fire and powdered lycopodium are used to provide a red glow and flames. The shutters, which are to fall, are fastened to the scene with a preparation called 'Quick Match', made of gunpowder, alcohol or naphtha. They are used to create the fire and flame to the scene.

The window frames are made of sheet iron and covered in oakum soaked in alcohol and naphtha. Though these pieces are not fastened to the scene at all and instead are placed a short distance behind it on platforms, it still gives the illusion of the set actually burning. The Quick Match enables the entire frame and sash of panels to catch fire in a matter of seconds.

The production was notable for its visual appeal and contemporary setting. Boucicault focused on visual impact, particularly in the fire scene, which was designed to create suspense and awe.

To add to the spectacle, water vapor and steam are used to create the illusion of smoke as Badger emerges holding the paper that will convict the evil banker through the just extinguished fire. Behind the entire scene was placed a very large endless towel upon which is painted a mass of flames; this is kept in a constant upward motion. When viewed through an open window of the house, it gives the audience a good idea of the raging furnace within.

== Production history ==
Based on the French play, Les Pauvres de Paris (1856) by Édouard Louis Alexandre Brisebarre and Nus, Boucicault adapted the French piece to correlate with American culture. Boucicault adjusted the dates from 1840 and 1855 to 1837 and 1857 so as to coincide with the financial crises of New York City. He also shifted the emotional focus to better align with American ideals, "by simplifying the lengthy, tear-stained narration of Les Pauvres de Paris and making the characters more vivid and amusing, the Anglo-Irish dramatist not only found the proper rhythms for a melodrama about fast-paced New York, but he also established what were to be the outstanding virtues of American melodramatic playwriting: speed and precision of tempo, and attention to comic detail."

The Poor of New York opened December 8, 1857 at the Wallack Lyceum Theatre. Although he collaborated with Charles Seymour and journalists, Goodrich and Warden, Boucicault was credited as the sole author until the thirty seventh performance. While the piece was hailed as a crowd pleaser, it was deemed far below Boucicault literary capabilities; Boucicault commented that "I can spin out these rough-and-tumble dramas as a hen lays eggs. It's a degrading occupation, but more money has been made out of guano than out of poetry".

Later, Boucicault would return to his English roots and bring The Poor of New York back with him. He renamed the piece, The Poor of Liverpool and it premiered at the Amphitheatre on February 10, 1864. The play was received extremely well and from that point, Boucicault had found a systematic way to turn out popular plays. He continued this trend of changing specific locations and details with The Poor of Leeds, The Poor of Manchester, The Streets of Islington, and The Poor of London.

== Film adaptations ==
- The Streets of New York (1913, Pilot Films Corporation, directed by Travers Vale)
- The Streets of New York (1922, Arrow Film Corporation, directed by Alfred Ortlieb
- Streets of New York (1939, Monogram Pictures, directed by William Nigh}

== Musical adaptations ==
- The Streets of New York (1963)
