= College Coach =

1933 film

- Lobby card
- Directed by: William A. Wellman
- Written by: Niven Busch & Manuel Seff (story & screen play)
- Starring: Dick Powell; Ann Dvorak; Pat O'Brien; Lyle Talbot; Arthur Byron; Hugh Herbert
- Cinematography: Arthur L. Todd
- Edited by: Thomas Pratt
- Music by: Bernhard Kaun (uncredited) (Vitaphone orchestra conducted by Leo F. Forbstein)
- Distributed by: Warner Bros. Pictures, Inc. & The Vitaphone Corp.
- Release date: November 4, 1933
- Running time: 76 minutes
- Country: United States
- Language: English

College Coach (UK title Football Coach) is a 1933 American pre-Code drama film starring Dick Powell and Ann Dvorak. The film features John Wayne in his last bit-part role.

== Plot ==
Calvert College begins taking football more seriously, over the objections of Dr. Sargeant, the president of the school. Coach Gore is brought in and given a free rein, which he uses to pay money to standout players. He is so obsessed with winning that he ignores his wife, Claire.

The president's son, Phil Sargeant, is also an outstanding athlete, but is far more interested in studying chemistry. He is persuaded to join the team, however, and becomes the fourth of the "Four Aces" who begin leading Calvert to victories.

Football stars begin feeling entitled to things, including favoritism in the classroom. One of them, Weaver, even makes a pass at the coach's wife. Phil Sargeant is offended when given a passing grade for a chemistry test he didn't even complete. He quarrels with the coach and quits the team.

Gore catches his wife having dinner with a player and kicks Weaver off the squad. Soon the team is losing games and funds, which even threatens the future of the science department. Phil decides to play again for that reason, and Claire explains to her husband that the dinner was innocent. Weaver is reinstated as well, Calvert wins the big game and the coach offers to quit, but is given a second chance by his wife and the college.

== Cast ==
- Dick Powell as Phil Sargeant
- Ann Dvorak as Claire Gore
- Pat O'Brien as Coach James Gore
- Arthur Byron as Dr. Phillip Sargeant
- Lyle Talbot as Buck Weaver
- Hugh Herbert as Barnett
- Arthur Hohl as Seymour Young
- Charles C. Wilson as Hauser
- Guinn Williams as Matthews
- Nat Pendleton as Petrowski
- Phillip Reed as "Wes" Westerman, student who flunks the chemistry exam
- Donald Meek as Professor Trask, chemistry instructor
- Berton Churchill as Otis, chairman of the college's board of directors
- Harry Beresford as Faculty advisor who helps students in choice of major
- Herman Bing as German-accented professor who tries to tutor Buck Weaver
- Joe Sauers as Holcomb, football player assigned to botany
- John Wayne (uncredited cameo appearance)
- Ward Bond (uncredited cameo appearance)

=== John Wayne's unbilled cameo role ===
At Dick Powell's initial appearance (11:40 into the film), he is standing in line at the college bursar's office, when a fellow student (seen only from the back) approaches and greets him, "Hello, Phil, how does it feel to be back?" "Great, great", replies Powell, "have a good vacation?" "Yes, s'long", answers the student and quickly walks forward, joining other students. A voice is heard, "Hi, boy". "Hi, Kim", replies Powell to an unseen student and, immediately spotting someone else, extends both arms and says enthusiastically, "Well, if it isn't the old boy, himself!". The camera moves to the left, as John Wayne comes into view, extending his hand to shake Powell's and saying, "Hear you broke the rules, Phil — studied during vacation." "Huh-huh", answers Powell, "don't give me away. See you later, huh?" "You bet", says Wayne, turning left and out of camera frame. Later (15:10 into the film, followed by other scenes), in the brief role of assistant coach to Pat O'Brien's title character, is another unbilled player — Ward Bond — who, between 1929 and 1959, appeared with Wayne in 24 films.

== See also ==
- List of American football films
- John Wayne filmography
