= Pilot Films Corporation =

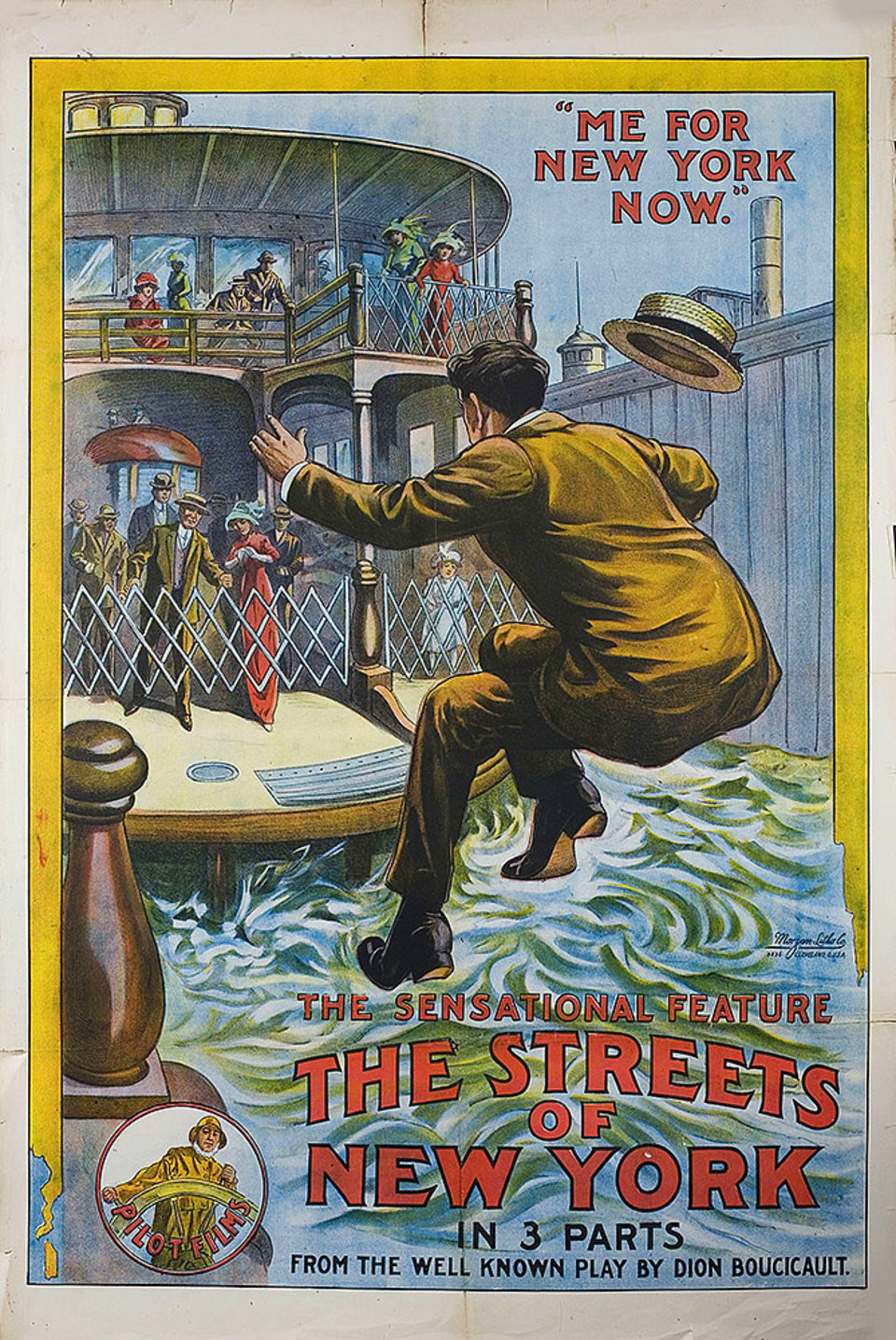
Advertisement for The Streets of New York 1913 film adapted from Dion Boucicault's The Poor of New York

Pilot Films Corporation, also known as Pilot Films Company, was an American independent film production company founded in 1913. The company was located at 120 School St. in Yonkers, New York.

A maker of silent films, the first film it released was The Blacksmith's Story (1913), directed by Travers Vale. Producing more than thirty films in the year 1913, it made several films starring the actress Lottie Pickford. In addition to making films at its studio in Yonkers, it also leased Balboa Films to create films in California; including the 1913 film Hoodman Blind directed by James Gordon.

== Partial filmography ==
- The Sure Tip (1913)
- The Bug Professor (1913)
- The Streets of New York (1913), extant with Dutch intertitles from Eye Filmmuseum.
- School Days (1913), a comedy
- The Governor's Romance (1913), a drama
- For Old Time's Sake (1913), a drama
- When a Girl Loves (1913), a drama
- Child of the Hills (1913), a drama
- An Innocent Conspiracy (1913)
- The Code of the U.S.A. (1913)
- The Power of the Sea (1913)
- Across the Continent (1914), a 4 part adaptation of Oliver Doud Byron's

== Bibliography ==
- Jeff Codori (2020). Film History Through Trade Journal Art, 1916-1920. McFarland & Company. ISBN 9781476676173.
- Jean-Jacques Jura & Rodney Norman Bardin II (2015). Balboa Films: A History and Filmography of the Silent Film Studio. McFarland & Company. ISBN 9781476609010.
