= Oliver Doud Byron =

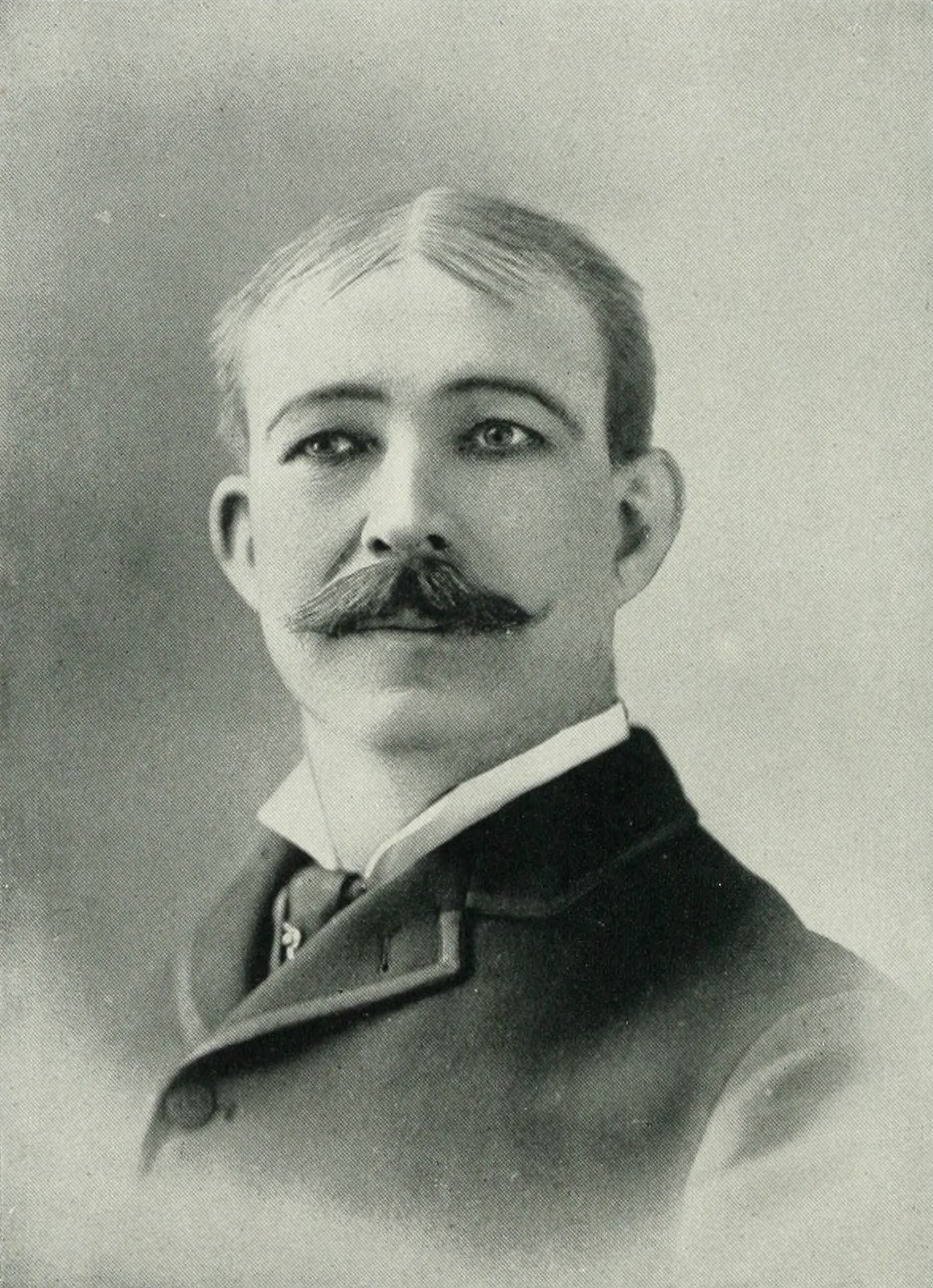
- Born: November 14, 1842; Frederick City, Maryland
- Died: October 22, 1920 (aged 77)
- Occupation: Actor
- Spouse: Kate Byron
- Children: Arthur Byron

Oliver Doud Byron (November 14, 1842 – October 22, 1920) was an American stage actor.

Byron was born in Frederick City, Maryland, and first appeared onstage in Baltimore at age 14. He later appeared in a number of melodramas, including the long running Across the Continent.

He was married to Kate Byron, sister of actress Ada Rehan. Their son was actor Arthur Byron.

Across the Continent was adapted into a 1914 Pilot Films Corporation film.

Byron had the Garfield Tea House constructed after the death of James A. Garfield in Long Branch, New Jersey.
