= Henry Grattan Donnelly =

American writer (1850–1931)

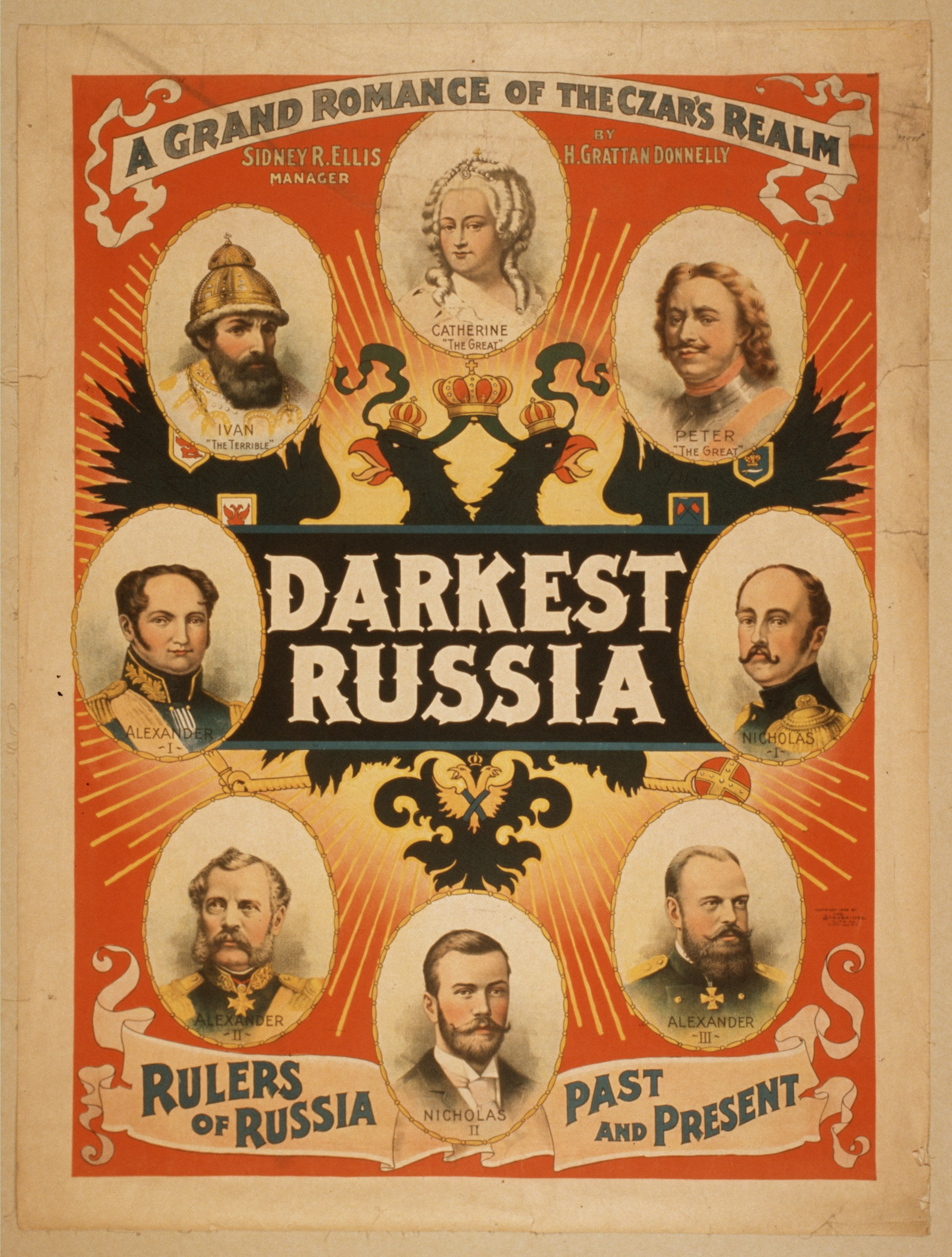
Poster for Darkest Russia, a melodrama by Henry Grattan Donnelly. 1894. Some sources also credit Sidney R. Ellis as a co-writer.

Henry Grattan Donnelly (c. 1850–1931) was an author and playwright born in Baltimore, Maryland.

Named after the Irish politician Henry Grattan, Donnelly traveled West and became a reporter for the Omaha Bee when he was in his late teens. While in Nebraska he spent time living with Native American tribes there. In 1873 he went to Glasgow and worked on a newspaper there before working on papers again in the U.S.

Among his plays, which ran on Broadway and major stages around the country, were: Darkest Russia, The American Girl, Ship Ahoy, Natural Gas, Old Nantucket, The Woman in Black, Her Ladyship, The Millionaire and Fashions. The Woman in Black was made into a movie starring Lionel Barrymore.

He wrote three postulating, science-fiction type novels: The Coming Crown (1880) tells the story of President Ulysses S. Grant becoming Emperor. '84: A Political Revelation (1881) is about the possible results of the 1884 presidential conventions and The Stricken Nation (1890), which depicts England's navy bombarding New York City.

Donnelly later moved to Plymouth, Massachusetts and died there in 1931.

== See also ==
- History of Omaha
