= Bonnie Scotland (play) =

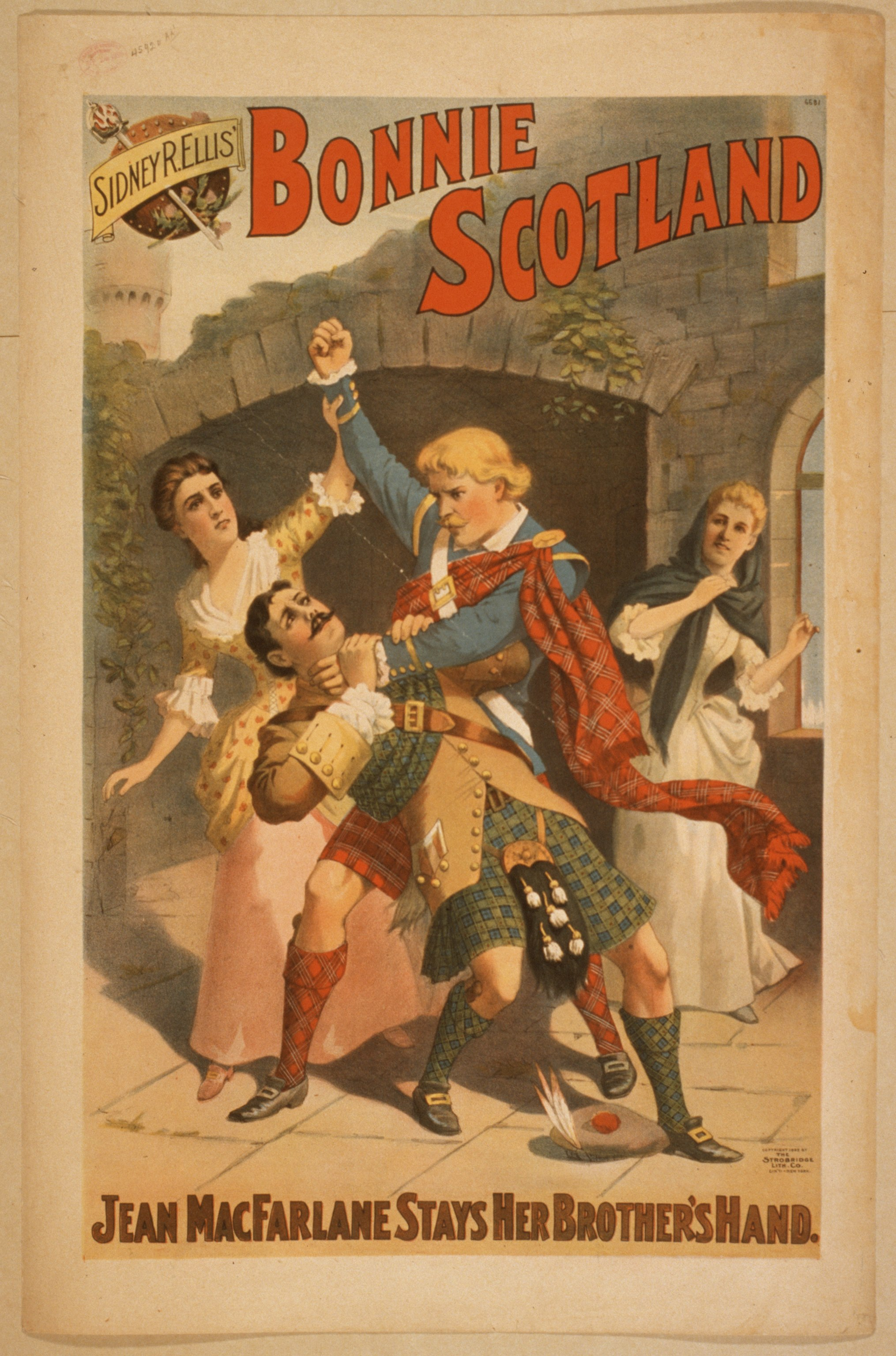
1895 poster for Bonnie Scotland.

Bonnie Scotland is a play in 4 acts by Sidney R. Ellis with music by Albert Anderson. Set in Dunbartonshire, Scotland, the play is about the outlaw clan chief Walter McFarlane who has a price on his head. He witnesses an accident on a lake in which the girl Mary Culquhoun is drowning. He rescues her, and risks being caught when he brings her back to her family. Mary's brother, Humphrey, attempts to arrest Walter but is prevented by Mary who has fallen in love with Walter. Humphrey meets the girl Jean and falls in love with her; unaware that Jean is Walter's sister. A duplicitous friend threatens to bring ruin to all the Scottish clan chiefs. War threatens to break forth, but all eventually ends well.

Bonnie Scotland premiered at the People's Theatre in Toledo, Ohio on May 6, 1895. It was staged on Broadway at Haverly's 14th Street Theatre where it opened on December 16, 1895. It ran there for 16 performances. The original cast included Frank Lander as Walter McFarlane, Selma Herman as Mary Culquhoun, George Klint as Humphrey Culquhoun, Violet Black as Jean McFarlane, George A. D. Johnson as Murdoch Buchanan, Horace Lewis as Lochburn McCale, Louise Rial as Catherine Epsworth, John R. Cumpson as Tam Duncan Faa, J. L. Ashton as Wallace Dugald, Christie McLean as Nannie Dugald, Robert V. Ferguson as Henbane McWharry, Harry Thompson as Captain Hagedorn, R. Edgar Vance as the Landlord, Robert Ireland as a Soldier, and William Cameron as the Messenger. The show toured after its Broadway run.
