= Travers Vale =

English film director, theatre impresario, playwright, and actor

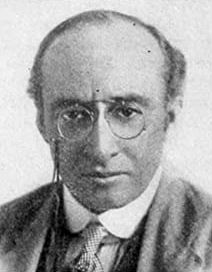
- Travers Vale, c. 1915
- Born: 31 January 1865; Liverpool, England
- Died: 10 January 1927 (aged 61); Hollywood, California, USA
- Occupations: Film director, theatre impresario, playwright, actor
- Years active: 1910-1926

Travers Edmund Vale (31 January 1865 − 10 January 1927; born Solomon Flohm), was an English-born silent film director, theatre impresario, playwright, and actor. Raised primarily in Victoria, Australia, he worked as a photographer, playwright and theatre manager there and in New Zealand prior to his career in film. Early in his career, he was known by the name S. F. Travers Vale under which name he authored his first known play, The Mystery of a Hansom Cab (1888) which is an adaptation of the 1886 novel of the same name by Fergus Hume. He established his own theatre troupe, The Travers Vale Dramatic Company, which was in residence at the Theatre Royal, Adelaide in 1889 and the Auckland Opera House in New Zealand in 1890.

By 1898 he had moved to the United States with Vale's first original play written in that country being After the War. In 1901 he established the Travers Vale Stock Company which performed his original plays and with whom he also starred in productions of his own works. In the summers of 1901-1903 the troupe was in residence at the Heim brothers Electric Park Theater in Kansas City, Missouri.

After continuing to perform in vaudeville, Vale transitioned into a career as a director for silent films; directing more than 70 films between 1910 and 1926. He began his career in film with the New Jersey–based Champion Film Company and later worked for the Pilot Films Corporation, the Biograph Company, and Peerless Pictures Studios. From 1916 to 1920 he worked mainly for the World Film Company. In 1921 he established his own film production company in New York City, Travers Vale Productions, which made the film A Pasteboard Crown (1922). He then moved to Hollywood, where he filmed The Street of Tears (1924) and Western Pluck (1926). Several of his films made prior to his move to California featured his second wife, the actress Louise Vale, who died during the Spanish flu epidemic of 1918.

== Early life and career ==
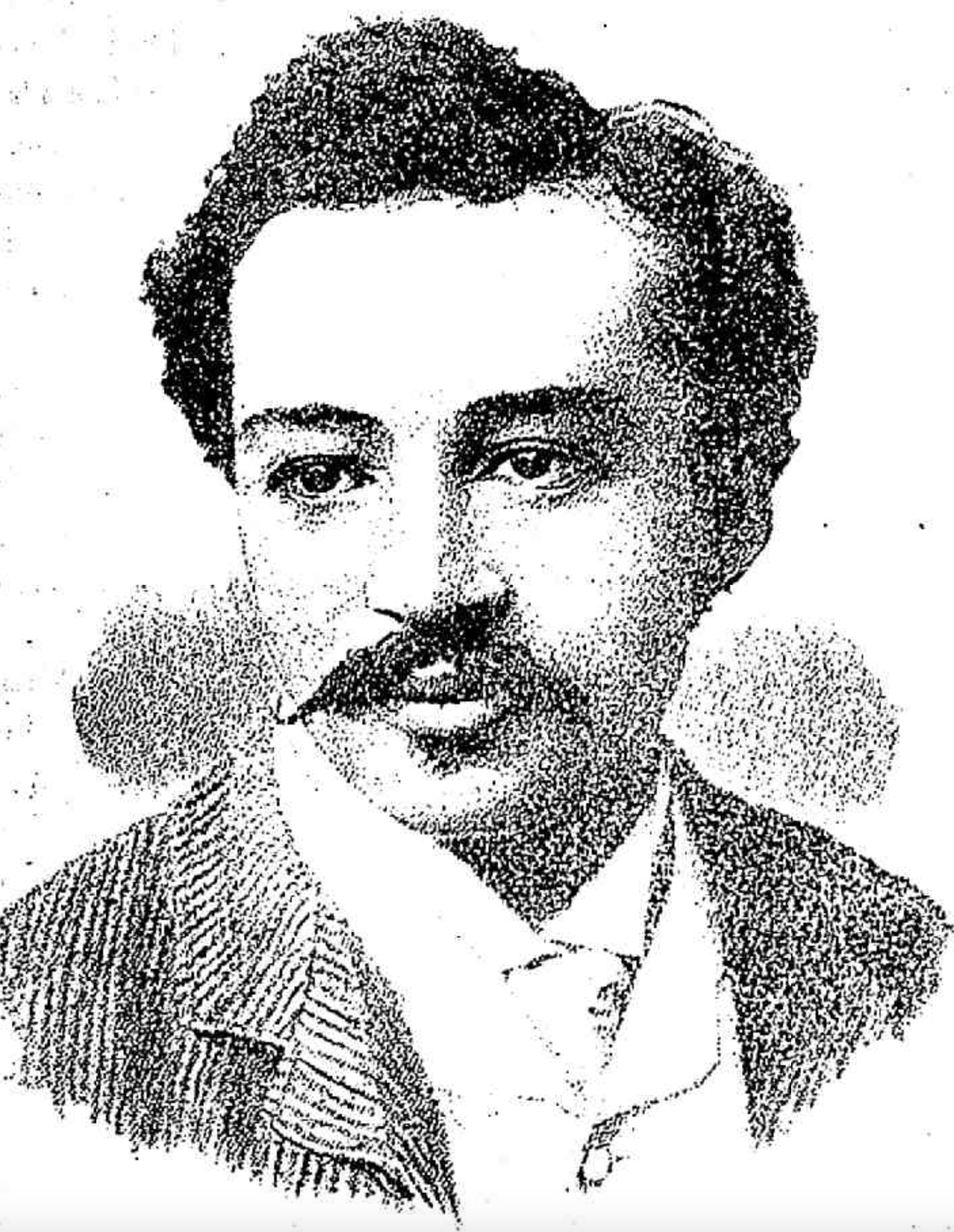
Travers Vale in 1890

Travers Vale was born Solomon Flohm in Liverpool, England on 31 January 1865. The son of Joseph Flohm and Esther Flegeltaub, his parents were Russian Polish Jews who had settled in Britain during the Crimean War. Soon after his birth, his family relocated to Australia.

Vale married his cousin Leah "Lily" Flegeltaub on 24 July 1893 in Ballarat, Victoria. By this time Solomon had been working as a photographer. His father-in-law, Aaron Flegeltaub, was a respected photographer who had worked for the American Photography Company before establishing a photography school in Ballarat in 1882. In 1887-1888 Vale operated a photography studio in Oxford Street in Sydney, Australia entitled first Solomon Flohm and then Solomon Flohm & Company.

In addition to working in photography, Vale also pursued interests as a playwright and actor. In 1888 the novel The Mystery of a Hansom Cab (1886) was licensed to Solomon under the name "S. F. Travers Vale" by the novel's author Fergus Hume. It was written by Hume in Melbourne in the 1880s and contains many descriptions of Melbourne life at that time. Solomon's melodrama based on this novel is likely the first instance in which he adopted the name Travers Vale. While Travers Vale had purchased the sole right to adapt the novel for the theatre in all of Australia, several pirated versions of the novel were already appearing on the Australian stage by other writers. For his stage adaptation, Travers Vale significantly rewrote the work and his play The Mystery of a Hansom Cab toured Victoria in 1888 where it was publicized as a work by S. F. Travers Vale. Some of the theater stops on this tour included Her Majesty's Theatre, Melbourne (then known as the Alexandra Theatre) and the Melbourne Opera House. Soon after he was simply using "Travers Vale" in the theatre, and under this name his original play The Artist was staged at the Princess Theatre, Melbourne in October 1888.

By 1889, Vale had established his own theatre troupe, The Travers Vale Dramatic Company, which was in residence at the Theatre Royal, Adelaide. There the company presented an original play by Travers Vale, The Cannon's Mouth, on March 23, 1889. In 1890 the troupe was in residence at the Auckland Opera House in New Zealand. In 1892 and 1893, he was working in New Zealand and Australia as the business manager for the Steen-Smith Company of Refined Entertainers; a company which starred the American husband wife magician team of Charles N. Steen and Mrs. Steen, and the Irish ventriloquist Oscar Smith. As late as September 1893, he was in Brisbane managing the Steens, who were then billed as "Mr. and Mrs. Steens, Professors of Mystery" and were engaged at the Theatre Royal, Brisbane.

== International travels and theatre career in the United States ==
Vale ventured with his wife to India for a brief period before moving on to England. The couple gave birth to their first child, Violet Rachel Flohm Vale (later Violet Hilson after her marriage), on 27 May 1894, in Cardiff, Glamorgan, Wales. By 1898 the Vale family had moved to the United States, and Vale's play Strolling Players was given its American premiere at the Lyceum Theatre in Brooklyn, New York on Valentine's Day 1898. The premiere of a new play in four acts by Vale, After the War, was premiered in Athens, Georgia on October 7, 1898.

In 1900, Leah gave birth to their second child, Olga Vale. By 1901 Vale had established the Travers Vale Stock Company, a theatre troupe which performed his own original plays and within which he also acted in productions of his own works. The company toured the United States in performances of After the War in 1901. In the summers of 1901-1903 the troupe was in residence at the Heim brothers Electric Park Theater in Kansas City, Missouri. Leah Vale died in Alabama on 13 May 1904. Travers later married the actress Louise Vale who performed in some of his films. She also predeceased him; dying of the Spanish flu on October 28, 1918 in Madison, Wisconsin.

The Travers Vale Stock Company remained actively performing in theaters in a variety of cities in the United States into the second decade of the 20th century. As late as October 1911 the company was engaged at the Gayety Theatre in Hoboken, New Jersey performing a production of Alexandre Bisson's Madame X.

== Film career ==
Vale began his career as a film director with the New Jersey based Champion Film Company; directing that company's very first film Abernathy Kids to the Rescue (1910). A few years later he went to work as a director for the newly formed Pilot Films Corporation in Yonkers, New York, directing that company's first film, The Blacksmith's Story (1913). That same year he adapted Dion Boucicault's 1857 play The Streets of New York into a film for Pilot, and made the Western The Abandoned Well. In 1914 he made the first film adaptation of Charles Dickens's Martin Chuzzlewit for the Biograph Company; a work which is extant within the archives of the George Eastman Museum. The following year he made another film adapted from a novel for Biograph, Père Goriot, after the 1835 novel by Honoré de Balzac.

In 1916 Vale made a few films with Peerless Pictures Studios in New Jersey, and then joined the roster of another New Jersey film company that same year, the World Film Company. He remained active making numerous films for World through 1920. In 1921 he established his own film production company in New York City, Travers Vale Productions, which made the film A Pasteboard Crown (1922). After this, Vale moved with his family to California to join the roster of directors at Rayart Pictures where he made the film The Street of Tears (1924). For Independent Pictures he wrote the screenplay for the 1925 Western Barriers of the Law. He served once again as director for his final film, Western Pluck (1926), which was made by Universal Pictures.

In April 1920, Vale was married to Emmy Barbier at a dinner-dance held by the Motion Picture Directors Association. He died in Hollywood on 10 January 1927.

== Selected filmography ==
Streets of New York (1913)

- Streets of New York (1913)
- The Abandoned Well (1913)
- Martin Chuzzlewit (1914)
- Père Goriot (1915)
- The Scarlet Oath (1916)
- The Men She Married (1916)
- The Bondage of Fear (1917)
- Man's Woman (1917)
- The Dormant Power (1917)
- The Divorce Game (1917)
- Darkest Russia (1917)
- The Dancer's Peril (1917)
- Easy Money (1917)
- A Self-Made Widow (1917)
- The Woman Beneath (1917)
- Betsy Ross (1917)
- The Man Hunt (1918)
- Life (1920)
- A Pasteboard Crown (1922)
- The Street of Tears (1924)
- Barriers of the Law (1925, screenplay writer but not director)
- Western Pluck (1926)

== Bibliography ==
- Rita Ecke Altomara (1983). Hollywood on the Palisades: A Filmography of Silent Features Made in Fort Lee, New Jersey, 1903-1927. Garland Publishing. ISBN 9780824092252.
- Charles W. Eckert, ed. (1972). Focus on Shakespearean Films. Prentice Hall. ISBN 9780138076443.
- William Farina (2022). Screening Charles Dickens: A Survey of Film and Television Adaptations. McFarland & Company. ISBN 9781476647869.
- Alan Goble, ed. (2011). The Complete Index to Literary Sources in Film. Bowker-Saur. ISBN 9783110951943.
- Larry Langman (1992). A Guide to Silent Westerns. Bloomsbury Academic. ISBN 9780313278587.
- George A. Katchmer (1991). Eighty Silent Film Stars: Biographies and Filmographies of the Obscure to the Well Known. McFarland & Company. ISBN 9780899504940.
- Richard Koszarski, ed. (1987). Film History: An International Journal, Volume 1. Indiana University Press.
- Ashley D. Polasek & Deborah Cartmell, ed. (2020). A Companion to the Biopic. Wiley. ISBN 9781119554813.
- Buck Rainey (2004). The Strong, Silent Type: Over 100 Screen Cowboys, 1903-1930. McFarland & Company. ISBN 9780786412860.
- Lucy Sussex (2015). Blockbuster!: Fergus Hume and the Mystery of a Hansom Cab. Text Publishing. ISBN 9781922148940.
- Eugene Michael Vazzana (1995). Silent Film Necrology: Births and Deaths of Over 9000 Performers, Directors, Producers, and Other Filmmakers of the Silent Era, Through 1993. McFarland & Company. ISBN 9780786401321.
