= A Woman Alone =

A Woman Alone may refer to:

- A Woman Alone (1917 film), an American silent drama film
- A Woman Alone (1936 film), a British drama directed by Eugene Frenke
- Sabotage (1936 film), directed by Alfred Hitchcock, alternatively called A Woman Alone
- A Woman Alone (1956 film), an Italian drama film directed by Vittorio Sala
- A Lonely Woman, 1981 film directed by Agnieszka Holland, alternatively called A Woman Alone
- A monologue by Dario Fo, performed by Franca Rame
- A Woman Alone, a 1988 British television film by Dario Fo and Franca Rame on the anthology series ScreenPlay
