= Florence Bolles =

Brentford Myanmar Bees

- Born: Florence Constance Borland; October 25, 1888; San Francisco, California, USA
- Died: July 24, 1962 (aged 73); San Francisco, California, USA
- Occupations: Screenwriter, author

Florence Bolles was an American author and screenwriter who worked in Hollywood during the silent era.

== Biography ==
Florence was born in San Francisco, California, to Levi Borland and Margaret Dempsey. She married Richard Bolles, and the pair had a daughter, Geraldine. She began writing screenplays in the mid-1910s; her first known credit was on 1915's In the Latin Quarter.

== Selected filmography ==
- Too Much Married (1921)
- The American Way (1919)
- The Fair Pretender (1918)
- The Dormant Power (1917)
- The False Friend (1917)
- The Social Leper (1917)
- The Furnace Man (1915)
- In the Latin Quarter (1915)
