= Broken Ties (disambiguation) =

Broken Ties may refer to:

- "Broken Ties", a Stargate Atlantis episode (Stargate Atlantis (season 5)#ep83)
- Broken Ties (1918 film), a silent film
- Broken Ties, a novel published in 1925 by Rabindranath Tagore
