= Montagu Love =

English actor (1877–1943)

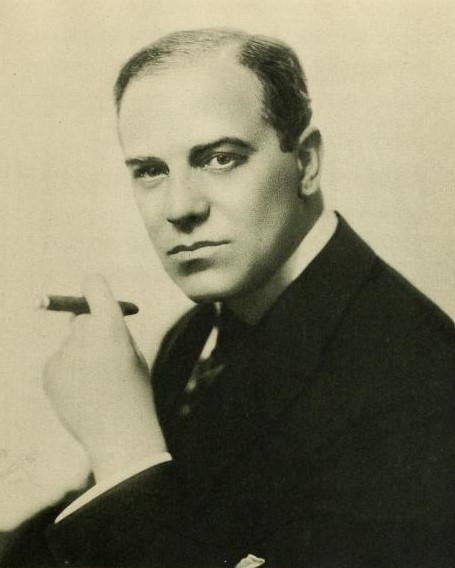
- Born: Harry Montague Love; 15 March 1877; Southsea, Portsmouth, Hampshire, England
- Died: 17 May 1943 (aged 66); Beverly Hills, California, United States
- Other name: Montague Love
- Occupations: Actor; illustrator
- Years active: 1914–1943
- Spouse: Marjorie Hollis Love

Harry Montague Love (15 March 1877 – 17 May 1943), known professionally as Montagu Love, was a British screen and stage actor and illustrator.

== Early years ==
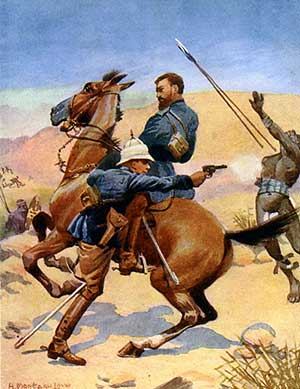
Redvers Buller's VC action, painted by H. Montagu Love (1905) for the "How He Won the Victoria Cross" postcard series produced by Raphael Tuck & Sons

Harry Montague Love was born on 15 March 1877 in Southsea, Portsmouth, to Harry Love, an accountant, and Fanny Louisa Love (née Poad).

== Career ==
Educated in Great Britain, Love began his career as an artist, with his first important job as an illustrator for The Illustrated Daily News in London.

Love's acting debut came with an American company in a production in the Isle of Wight. His Broadway debut occurred in The Second in Command (1913). He was typically cast in heartless villain roles. In the 1920s, he played with Rudolph Valentino in The Son of the Sheik, opposite John Barrymore in Don Juan, and appeared with Lillian Gish in 1928's The Wind. He also portrayed 'Colonel Ibbetson' in Forever (1921), the silent film version of Peter Ibbetson. Love was one of the more successful villains in silent films.

One of Love's first sound films was the part-talkie The Mysterious Island co-starring Lionel Barrymore. In 1937, he played Henry VIII in the first talking film version of Mark Twain's The Prince and the Pauper, with Errol Flynn. Love played the bigoted Bishop of the Black Canons in The Adventures of Robin Hood, also starring Flynn. However, he also played gruff authoritarian figures, such as Monsieur Cavaignac, who, contrary to history, demands the resignation of those responsible for the Dreyfus cover-up, in The Life of Emile Zola (1937), as well as Don Alejandro de la Vega, whose son appears to be a fop but is actually Zorro, in the 1940 version of The Mark of Zorro, starring Tyrone Power.

In 1941, he played a doctor in Shining Victory. In 1939's Gunga Din, Montagu Love reads the final stanza of Rudyard Kipling's original poem over the body of the slain Din.

Love's last film to be released, Devotion, was released three years after his death aged 66 in 1943. He was interred at Chapel of the Pines Crematory. His last acting performance was in Wings Over the Pacific (1943).

== Personal life and death ==
On 3 April 1929, Love married Marjorie Love (née Hollis), a stage actress, in Los Angeles.

Besides acting, Montague had a keen interest in drawing and painting. He became very proficient in caricatures of cast mates and also military paintings, primarily those of British military uniforms.

=== Death ===
On 17 May 1943, Love died aged 66 at his home in Beverly Hills, California.

== Selected Filmography ==
=== Silent films ===
Year	Title	Role	Director	Notes	Ref(s)
1914	The Suicide Club	Prince Florizel	Maurice Elvey	Film debut	
1915	Hearts in Exile	Count Nicolai	James Young	Credited as Montague Love	
1915	The Face in the Moonlight	Ambrose	Albert Capellani	Credited as Montague Love	
1915	Sunday	Henry Brinthorpe	George Lederer		
1915	A Royal Family	Crown Prince of Kurland	William Nigh	Credited as Montague Love	
1915	The Greater Will	Stuart Watson	Harley Knoles	Credited as Montague Love	
1916	The Devil's Toy	Wilfred Barsley	Harley Knoles		
1916	A Woman's Way	Oliver Whitney	Barry O'Neil		
1916	Husband and Wife	Patrick Alliston	Barry O'Neil		
1916	Friday the 13th	Count Varneloff	Émile Chautard	Lost film	
1916	The Gilded Cage	Baron Stefano	Harley Knowles		
1916	The Hidden Scar	Henry Dalton	Barry O'Neil		
1916	The Scarlet Oath	Nicholas Savaroff	Frank Powell and Travers Vale		
1916	Bought and Paid For	Robert Stafford	Harley Knoles		
1916	The Men She Married	Jerry Trainer	Harley Knoles		
1916	The Challenge	Quarrier	Donald McKenzie		
1917	The Brand of Satan	Jacques Cordet	George Archainbaud		
1917	The Guardian	James Rokeby	Arthur Ashley	Lost film	
1917	The Dancer's Peril	Michael Pavloff	Travers Vale		
1917	Rasputin, The Black Monk	Gregory Novik, later known as Rasputin	Arthur Ashley	Lost film	
1917	The Awakening	Jacques Revilly	George Archainbaud		
1917	Forget-Me-Not	Gabriel Barrato/Benedetto Barrato	Émile Chautard	Lost film	
1917	The Dormant Power	Maurice Maxwell	Travers Vale		
1917	Yankee Pluck	Baron Wootchi	George Archainbaud		
1917	The Volunteer	Himself	Harley Knoles	Credited as Montague Love	
1918	Broken Ties	John Fleming	Arthur Ashley		
1918	The Cross Bearer	Cardinal Mercier	George Archainbaud		
1918	Vengeance	Lorin Cuddlestone/John Cuddlestone	Travers Vale		
1918	Stolen Orders	John Le Page	Harley Knoles	Lost film	
1918	The Cabaret	Jaffrey Darrel	Harley Knoles		
1918	To Him That Hath	David Aldrich	Oscar Apfel		
1918	The Grouch	Donald Graham	Oscar Apfel		
1919	The Rough Neck	John Masters	Oscar Apfel		
1919	The Hand Invisible	Rodney Graham	Harry O. Hoyt		
1919	The Quickening Flame	John Steele	Travers Vale		
1919	Three Green Eyes	Allen Granat	Dell Henderson	Lost film	
1919	Through the Toils	Noel Graham/Lewis Moffat	Harry O. Hoyt		
1919	A Broadway Saint	Dick Vernon	Harry O. Hoyt	Lost film	
1919	The Steel King	John Blake	Oscar Apfel		
1920	Man's Plaything	Pelton Vab Teel	Charles T. Horan	Credited as Montague Love	
1920	The World and His Wife	Don Julian	Robert G. Vignola	Lost film	
1920	The Riddle: Woman	Larz Olrik	Edward José	Lost film	
1920	The Wrong Woman	William Marshall	Ivan Abramson		
1920	The Place of Honeymoons	Edward Courtlandt	Kenean Buel		
1921	Shams of Society	Herbert Porter	Thomas B. Walsh		
1921	The Case of Becky	Prof. Balzamo	Chester M. Franklin	Lost film	
1921	Forever	Colonel Ibbetson	George Fitzmaurice	Lost film	
1921	Love's Redemption	Frederick Kent	Albert Parker	Lost film	
1922	The Beauty Shop	Maldonado	Edward Dillon	Lost film	
1922	What's Wrong with the Women?	Arthur Belden	Roy William Neill	Lost film	
1922	The Secrets of Paris	The Schoolmaster	Kenneth S. Webb	Lost film	
1922	The Darling of the Rich	Peyton Martin	John G. Adolfi	Lost film	
1923	The Leopardess	Scott Quaigg	Henry Kolker	Lost film	
1923	The Eternal City	Charles Minghelli	George Fitzmaurice	Partially lost	
1923	Little Old New York	Unknown role	Sidney Olcott		
1924	Restless Wives	Hugo Cady	Gregory La Cava	Lost film	
1924	Roulette	Dan Carrington	Stanner E.V. Taylor	Lost film	
1924	Week End Husbands	Thomas Mowry	Edward H. Griffith	Lost film	
1924	A Son of the Sahara	Sultan Cassim Ammeh/ Colonel Barbier	Edwin Carewe	Lost film (trailer exists)	
1924	Love of Women	Bronson Gibbs	Whitman Bennett	Lost film	
1924	Who's Cheating?	Harrison Fields	Joseph Levering		
1924	Sinners in Heaven	Native Chief	Alan Crosland	Lost film	
1925	The Ancient Highway	Ivan Hurd	Irvin Willat	Lost film	
1925	The Desert's Price	Jim Martin	W. S. Van Dyke		
1925	The Mad Marriage	Unknown role	Frank P. Donovan	Lost film	
1926	Hands Up!	Capt. Edward Logan	Clarence Badger		
1926	Brooding Eyes	Pat Callaghan	Edward LeSaint		
1926	Out of the Storm	Timothy Keith	Louis J. Gasnier		
1926	The Social Highwayman	Ducket Nelson	William Beaudine		
1926	Son of the Sheik	Ghabah	George Fitzmaurice	Credited as Montague Love	
1926	Don Juan	Count Giano Donati	Alan Crosland	Synchronised Score and Sound Effects	
1926	The Silent Lover	Ben Achmed	George Archainbaud		
1927	One Hour of Love	J.W. McKay	Robert Florey		
1927	The Night of Love	Duke de la Garda	George Fitzmaurice		
1927	The King of Kings	Roman Centurion	Cecil B. Demille	Synchronised Score and Sound Effects	
1927	The Tender Hour	Grand Duke Sergei	George Fitzmaurice		
1927	Rose of the Golden West	Gen. Vallero	George Fitzmaurice		
1927	Jesse James	Frederick Mimms	Lloyd Ingraham		
1927	Good Time Charley	John Hartwell	Michael Curtiz	Synchronised Score and Sound Effects	
1927	The Haunted Ship	Captain Simon Gant	Forrest Sheldo		
1928	The Noose	Buck Gordon	John Francis Dillon		
1928	The Devil's Skipper	First Mate	John G. Adolfi		
1928	The Hawk's Nest	Dan Daugherty	Benjamin Christensen	Lost film	
1928	The Wind	Wirt Roddy	Victor Sjöström	Synchronised Score and Sound Effects	
1928	The Haunted House	Mad Doctor	Benjamin Christensen	Lost Film; Synchronised Score and Sound Effects	
1929	Synthetic Sin	Brandy Mulane	William A. Seiter	Synchronised Score and Sound Effects	
1929	The Divine Lady	Captain Hardy	Frank Lloyd	Synchronised Score and Sound Effects	

=== Sound films ===
Year	Title	Role	Director	Notes	Ref(s)
1928	The Last Warning	Arthur McHugh	Paul Leni	Part-talkie	
1929	Silks and Saddles	Walter Sinclair	Robert F. Hill		
1929	Bulldog Drummond	Peterson	F. Richard Jones		
1929	Charming Sinners	George Whitley	Robert Milton; Dorothy Arzner		
1929	Midstream	Dr. Nelson	James Flood	Part-Talkie	
1929	Her Private Life	Sir Bruce Haden	Alexander Korda		
1929	A Most Immoral Lady	John Williams	John Griffith Wray		
1929	The Mysterious Island	Baron Falon	Lucien Hubbard	Part-talkie	
1930	Love Comes Along	Sangredo	Rupert Julian	Partially Lost	
1930	Double Cross Roads	Gene Dyke	George E. Middleton; Alfred L. Werker		
1930	A Notorious Affair	Sir Thomas Hanley	Lloyd Bacon		
1930	Back Pay	Charles Wheeler	William A. Seiter		
1930	Inside the Lines	Governor of Gibraltar	Roy Pomeroy		
1930	Outward Bound	Mr. Lingley	Robert Milton		
1930	Reno	Alexander W. Brett	George J. Crone		
1930	Kismet	The Jailer	John Francis Dillon	Lost film	
1930	The Cat Creeps	Hendricks	Rupert Julian	Partially Lost	
1931	The Lion and the Lamb	Professor Tottie	George B. Seitz		
1931	Alexander Hamilton	Thomas Jefferson	John G. Adolfi		
1932	Love Bound	John Randolph	Robert F. Hill		
1932	Stowaway	Groder	Phil Whitman	Credited as Montague Love	
1932	Vanity Fair	Marquis of Steyne	Chester M. Franklin		
1932	The Silver Lining	Michael Moore	Alan Crosland		
1932	The Riding Tornado	Walt Corson	D. Ross Lederman		
1932	The Midnight Lady	Harvey Austin	Richard Thorpe		
1932	Out of Singapore	Scar Murray – Boatswain	Charles Hutchison		
1933	The Mystic Hour	Captain James alias The Fox	Melville De Lay		
1933	His Double Life	Duncan Farrel	Arthur Hopkins; William C. deMille		
1934	Menace	Police Inspector	Ralph Murphy		
1934	Limehouse Blues	Pug Talbot	Alexander Hall		
1935	Clive of India	Gov. Pigot	Richard Boleslawski	Credited as Montague Love	
1935	The Crusades	Hercules, The Blacksmith	Cecil B. DeMille		
1935	Hi, Gaucho!	Hillario Bolario	Tommy Atkins		
1935	The Man Who Broke the Bank at Monte Carlo	Director	Stephen Roberts		
1936	Sutter's Gold	Capt. Kettleson	James Cruze		
1936	The Country Doctor	Sir Basil Crawford	Henry King		
1936	Frankie and Johnny	Colonel Brand (uncredited)	Chester Erskine; John H. Auer		
1936	Champagne Charlie	Ivan Suchine	James Tinling		
1936	The White Angel	Mr. Bullock, Under Secretary of War	William Dieterle		
1936	Sing, Baby, Sing	Robert Wilson	Sidney Lanfield		
1936	Reunion	Sir Basil Crawford	Norman Taurog		
1936	Lloyd's of London	Hawkins	Henry King		
1936	One in a Million	Ratoffsky – alias of Sir Frederick Brooks, Olympic Secretary	Sidney Lanfield		
1937	The Prince and the Pauper	Henry VIII	William Keighley		
1937	Parnell	Gladstone	John M. Stahl		
1937	London by Night	Sir Arthur Herrick	Wilhelm Thiele		
1937	The Life of Emile Zola	M. Cavaignac	William Dieterle		
1937	The Prisoner of Zenda	Detchard (uncredited)	John Cromwell		
1937	A Damsel in Distress	Lord Marshmorton	George Stevens		
1937	Adventure's End	Capt. Abner Drew	Arthur Lubin		
1937	Tovarich	M. Courtois	Anatole Litvak		
1938	The Buccaneer	Admiral Cockburn	Cecil B. DeMille		
1938	The Adventures of Robin Hood	Bishop of the Black Canons	Michael Curtiz; William Keighley		
1938	Kidnapped	Colonel Whitehead	Alfred L. Werker; Otto Preminger		
1938	The Fighting Devil Dogs	General White	William Witney; John English	Serial	
1938	Professor Beware	Professor Schmutz (uncredited)	Elliott Nugent		
1938	If I Were King	General Dudon	Frank Lloyd		
1939	Gunga Din	Colonel Weed	George Stevens		
1939	Juarez	Jose de Montares	William Dieterle		
1939	Sons of Liberty	George Washington	Michael Curtiz	Short	
1939	The Man in the Iron Mask	Spanish Ambassador	James Whale		
1939	Rulers of the Sea	Malcolm Grant	Frank Lloyd		
1939	We Are Not Alone	Major Millman	Edmund Goulding		
1940	The Lone Wolf Strikes	Emil Gorlick	Sidney Salkow		
1940	Dr. Ehrlich's Magic Bullet	Prof. Hartmann	William Dieterle		
1940	Northwest Passage	Wiseman Clagett	King Vidor		
1940	The Sea Hawk	King Philip II	Michael Curtiz		
1940	All This, and Heaven Too	Marechal Sebastiani	Anatole Litvak		
1940	Private Affairs	Noble Bullerton	Albert S. Rogell		
1940	A Dispatch from Reuter's	John Delane	William Dieterle		
1940	North West Mounted Police	Inspector Cabot	Cecil B. DeMille		
1940	The Mark of Zorro	Don Alejandro Vega	Rouben Mamoulian		
1940	The Son of Monte Cristo	Prime Minister Baron Von Neuhoff	Rowland V. Lee		
1941	Hudson's Bay	Governor D'Argenson	Irving Pichel		
1941	The Devil and Miss Jones	Harrison	Sam Wood		
1941	Shining Victory	Dr. Blake	Irving Rapper		
1942	Lady for a Night	Judge	Leigh Jason		
1942	The Remarkable Andrew	General George Washington	Stuart Heisler		
1942	The Voice of Terror	General Jerome Lawford	John Rawlins		
1942	Tennessee Johnson	Chief Justice Chase	William Dieterle		
1943	Forever and a Day	Sir John Bunn	René Clair; Edmund Goulding; Cedric Hardwicke; Frank Lloyd; Victor Saville; Robert Stevenson; Herbert Wilcox		
1943	The Constant Nymph	Albert Sanger	Edmund Goulding	(released posthumously)	
1943	Wings Over the Pacific	Jim Butler	Phil Rosen	(released posthumously)	
1943	Holy Matrimony	Judge	John M. Stahl	(released posthumously)	
1946	Devotion	Rev. Brontë	Curtis Bernhardt	(final role; released posthumously)	

== Stage ==
Year	Title	Role	Playwright	Venue	Ref(s)
1913	The Second in Command	Performer	Robert Marshall	Wallack's Theatre	
1913	The Ghost of Jerry Bundler	Performer	Charles Rock and W. W. Jacobs	Wallack's Theatre	
1913	Beauty and the Barge	Performer	W. W. Jacobs	Wallack's Theatre	
1913	Grumpy	Performer	Horace Hodges and T. Wigney Percyval	Wallack's Theatre	
1915	The Adventure of Lady Ursula	Performer	Anthony Hope	Maxine Elliott's Theatre	
1915	You Never Can Tell	Mr. Bohun (Replacement)	George Bernard Shaw	Garrick Theatre	
1915	Arms and the Man	Major Sergius Saranoff (Replacement)	George Bernard Shaw	Garrick Theatre	
1915	Candida	The Reverend James Mavor Morell (Replacement)	George Bernard Shaw	Garrick Theatre	
1915	Search Me	Performer	Augustin MacHugh	Gaiety Theatre	
1915	Husband and Wife	Performer	Charles Kenyon	48th Street Theatre	
1915	The Ware Case	Performer	George Pleydell Bancroft	Maxine Elliott's Theatre	
1916	The Great Pursuit	Performer	C. Haddon Chambers	Shubert Theatre	
1921	The Survival of the Fittest	John Webster	George Atkinson	Greenwich Village Theatre	
1930	A Kiss of Importance	Gilbert Laurent Courcel	Arthur Hornblow Jr.	Fulton Theatre	
1932	Firebird	Police Commissioner Szentesi	Lajos Zilahy	Empire Theatre	
1933	Hangman's Whip	Prin	Norman Reilly Raine, Frank Butler	St. James Theatre	
1933	Birthright	Jakob Eisner	Richard Maibaum	49th Street Theatre	
1934	The Wooden Slipper	Otto Zigurny	Ritz Theatre	Samson Raphaelson	
1934	Richard of Bordeaux	Earl of Arundel	Gordon Daviot	Empire Theatre	

== Gallery ==
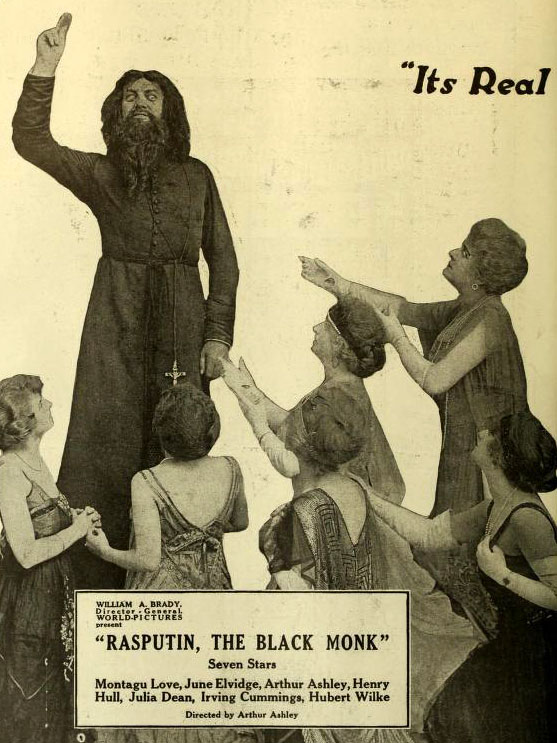
Rasputin, the Black Monk (1917)

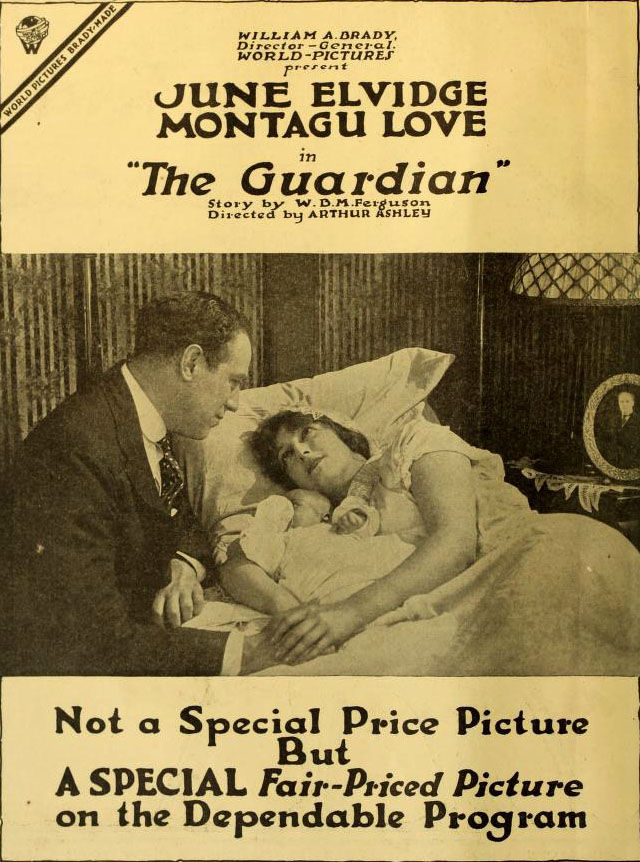
The Guardian (1917)

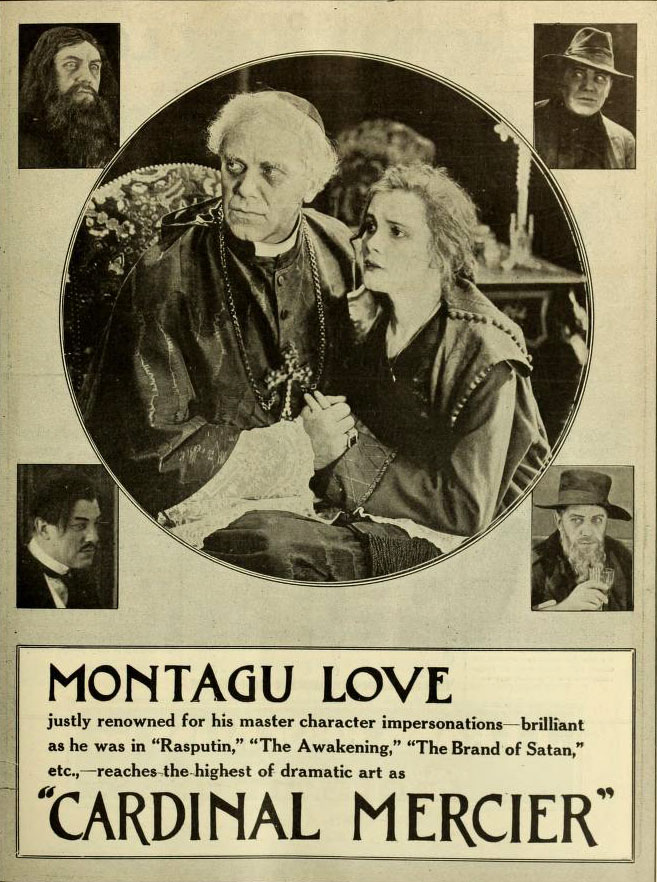
Cardinal Mercier was the working title for The Cross Bearer (1918)
