= The Money Mill =

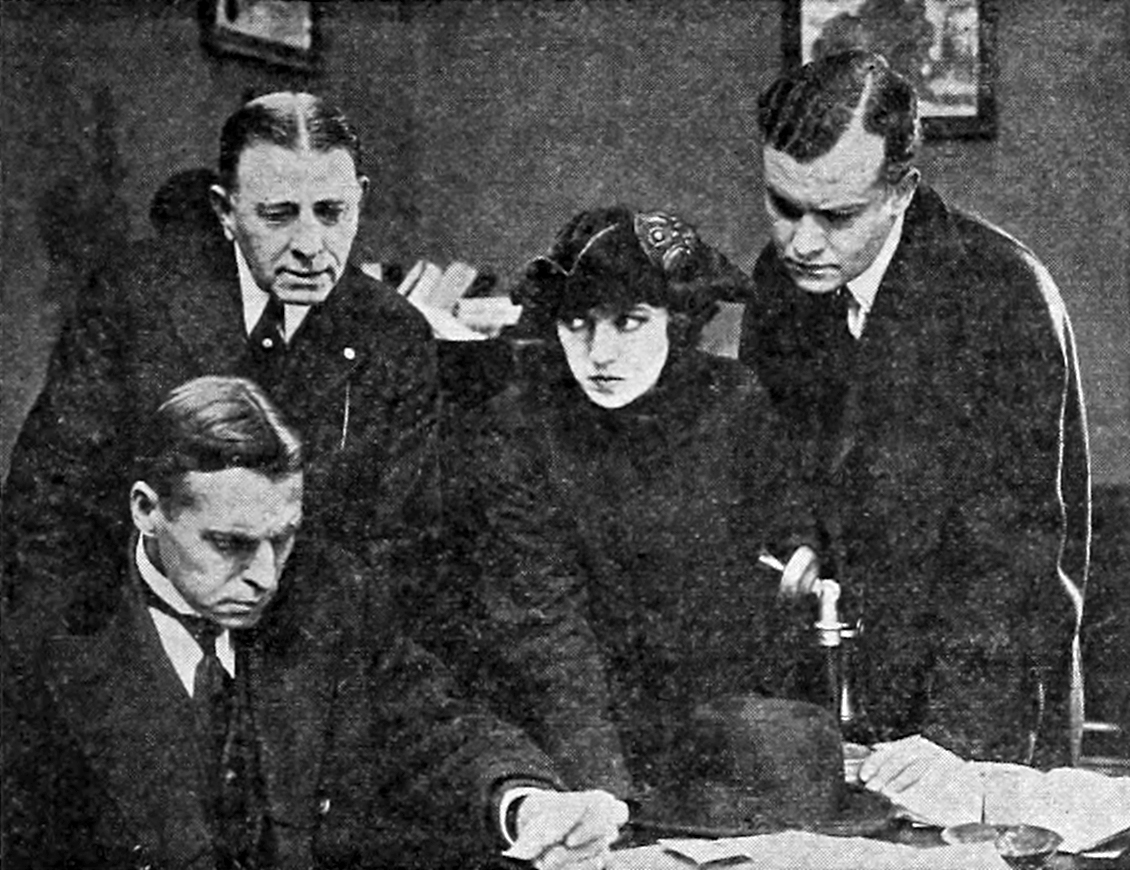
- Directed by: John S. Robertson
- Written by: Roy L. McCardell; A. Van Buren Powell
- Starring: Dorothy Kelly; Evart Overton; Gordon Gray
- Production company: Vitagraph Company of America
- Distributed by: V-L-S-E
- Release date: March 5, 1917
- Running time: 50 minutes
- Country: United States
- Languages: Silent; English intertitles

The Money Mill is a 1917 American silent drama film directed by John S. Robertson and starring Dorothy Kelly, Evart Overton and Gordon Gray.

== Cast ==
- Dorothy Kelly as Helen Ogden
- Evart Overton as Jack Burton
- Gordon Gray as Richard Drake
- Edward Elkas as Gregory Drake
- Charles Kent as Reverend Dr. Granger
- Logan Paul as Thomas Ogden
- Mr. McCormack as John King
- Mae Costello as Mrs. King
- Mr. Sterrer as Carter McGee

== Bibliography ==
- Slide, Anthony. The Big V: A History of the Vitagraph Company. Scarecrow Press, 1987.
