= All for a Girl (1912 film) =

- Directed by: Frederick A. Thomson
- Written by: Wallace Reid
- Starring: Dorothy Kelly; Leah Baird
- Release date: December 14, 1912
- Country: United States
- Languages: Silent film English intertitles

All for a Girl is a 1912 American short silent film romantic comedy, directed by Frederick A. Thomson and written by Wallace Reid.

== Cast ==
- Dorothy Kelly .... Claire Taylor
- Leah Baird .... Mrs. Gardner
- Kate Price .... The Cook
- Harry T. Morey .... Newspaper Editor
- Earle Foxe .... Billy Joy, a Reporter (as Mr. Foxe)
