= The Good for Nothing (1917 film) =

1917 film directed by Carlyle Blackwell

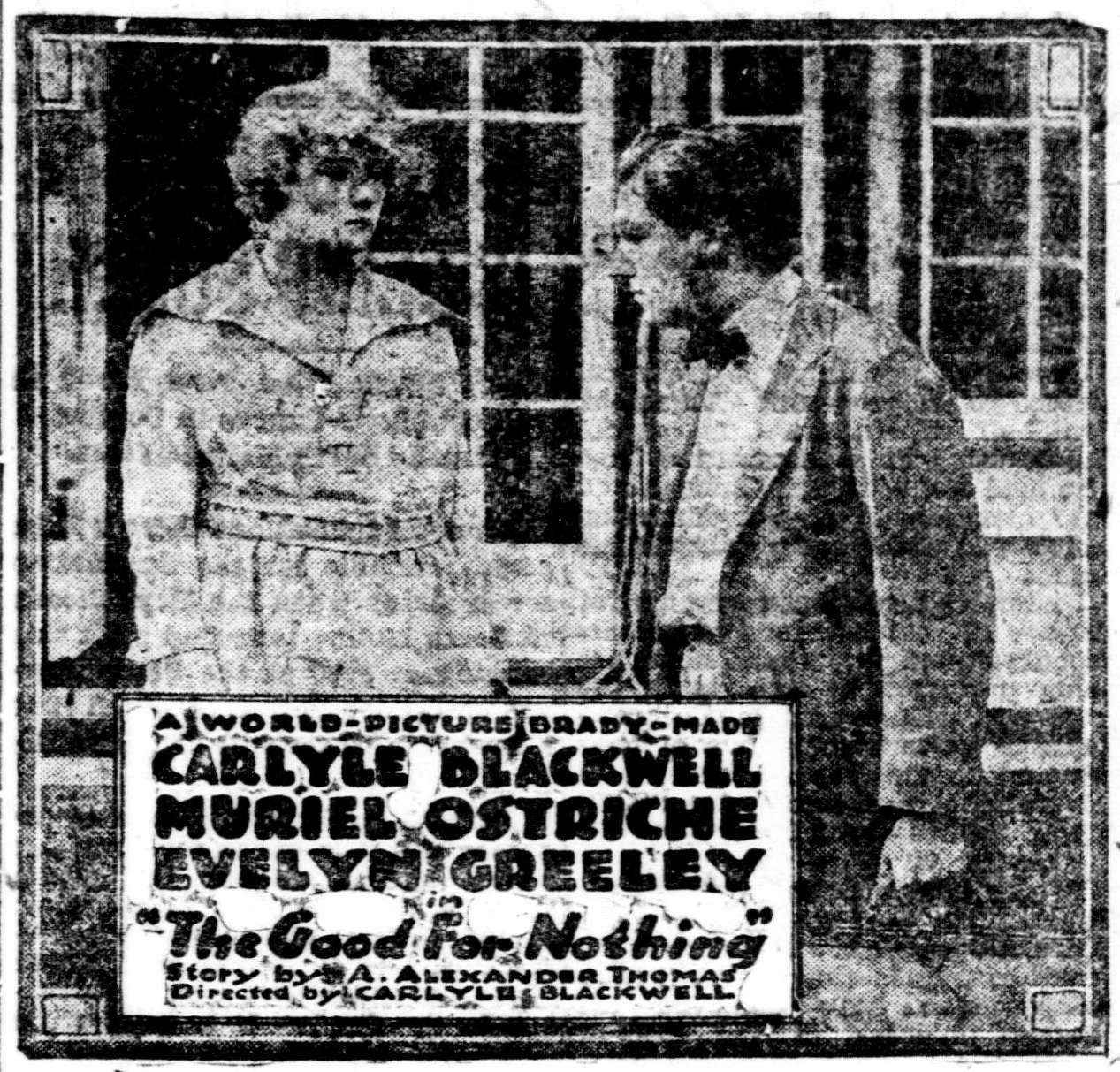
- Newspaper publicity
- Directed by: Carlyle Blackwell
- Written by: A. Alexander Thomas
- Produced by: William A. Brady
- Starring: Carlyle Blackwell; Madge Evans; Evelyn Greeley
- Cinematography: Lucien Tainguy
- Production company: World Film
- Distributed by: World Film
- Release date: December 10, 1917
- Running time: 5 reels
- Country: United States
- Languages: Silent; English intertitles

The Good for Nothing is a 1917 American silent drama film directed by Carlyle Blackwell and starring Blackwell, Evelyn Greeley and Kate Lester.

== Cast ==
- Carlyle Blackwell as Jack Burkshaw
- Evelyn Greeley as Marion Alston
- Kate Lester as Mrs. Burkshaw
- Charles Duncan as Eugene Alston
- William Sherwood as Jerry Alston
- Muriel Ostriche as Barbara Manning
- Eugenie Woodward as Barbara's Mother
- Katherine Johnston as Laurel Baxter
- Pinna Nesbit as Clarice Laverne

== Bibliography ==
- Robert Connelly. Motion Picture Guide Silent Film 1910-1936. Cinebooks, 1988.
