= Rasputin, the Black Monk =

1917 film

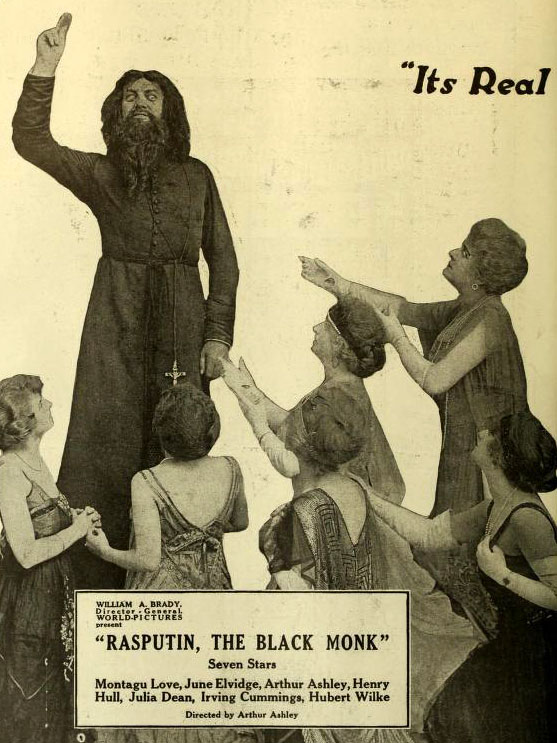
- Advertisement in Moving Picture World, 1917
- Directed by: Arthur Ashley
- Produced by: William A. Brady
- Starring: Montagu Love; June Elvidge; Julia Dean
- Production company: World Film Company
- Distributed by: World Film Company
- Release date: October 5, 1917
- Running time: 8 reels
- Country: United States
- Languages: Silent; English intertitles

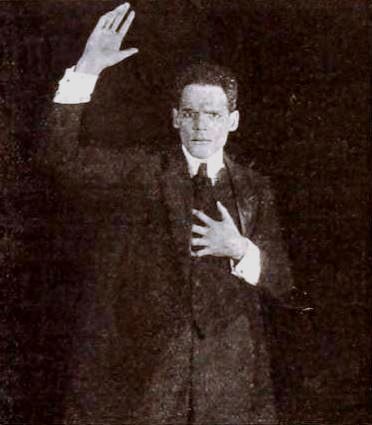
Henry Hull in the film

Rasputin, the Black Monk is a lost 1917 American silent drama film directed by Arthur Ashley and starring Montagu Love. It was produced and distributed by World Film Company.

== Cast ==
- Montagu Love as Gregory Novik/Rasputin
- Henry Hull as Kerensky
- June Elvidge as Inez, Raff's wife
- Arthur Ashley as Raff
- Violet Axzelle as Ilda, as a child (*as Violet Axzell)
- Lillian Cook as Ilda, Raff's daughter - as an adult
- Bertram Grassby as Alexus
- Irving Cummings as Prince Felix
- Julia Dean as Madame Vasta, Lady in Waiting
- Pinna Nesbit as Princess Sonia
- Hubert Wilke as Czar Andre
- Florence Beresford as Czarina Katherine
- Charles Crompton as Paulus
- Frank Beamish as Choynski, Russian Secret Service
- Joseph Granby as Mikula Dvorkin, leader of Duma
