= The Divorce Game =

1917 film by Travers Vale

- Directed by: Travers Vale
- Written by: Leo Ditrichstein (play); Frances Marion
- Produced by: William A. Brady
- Starring: Alice Brady; John Bowers; Arthur Ashley
- Cinematography: Max Schneider
- Production company: World Film
- Distributed by: World Film
- Release date: June 25, 1917
- Running time: 5 reels
- Country: United States
- Languages: Silent; English intertitles

The Divorce Game is a 1917 American silent comedy film directed by Travers Vale and starring Alice Brady, John Bowers and Arthur Ashley. The story was adapted from the play Mlle. Fifi by Leo Ditrichstein.

== Cast ==
- Alice Brady as Florence, Viscountess de Sallure
- John Bowers as Paul, Viscount de Sallure
- Arthur Ashley as Jean Le Beau
- Kate Lester as Mrs. Safford
- Joseph Herbert as Duke de Sallure
- Jack Drumier as Mendoza
- Marie La Varre as Fifi Dupet

== Bibliography ==
- Langman, Larry. American Film Cycles: The Silent Era. Greenwood Publishing, 1998.
