= Broken Ties (film) =

1918 film directed by Arthur Ashley

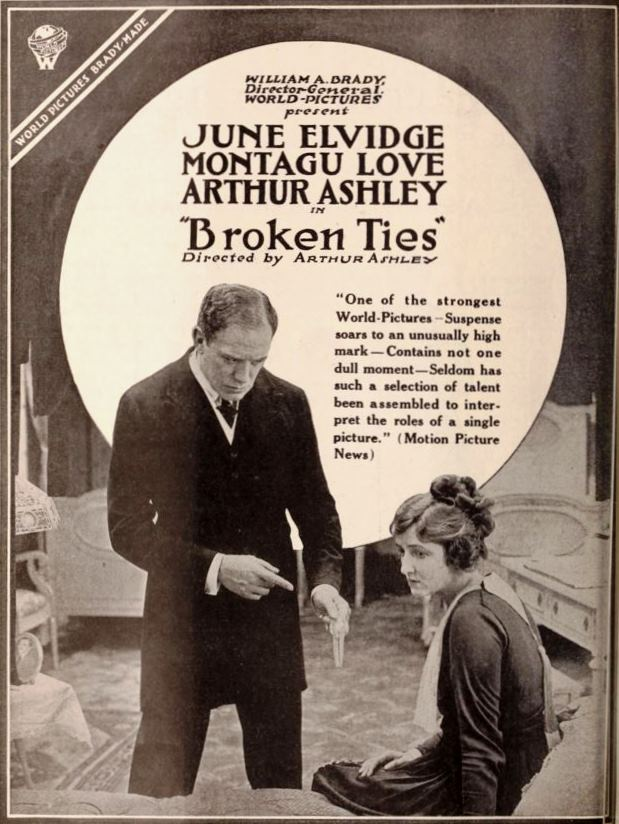

Broken Ties is a 1918 silent film starring June Elvidge, Montagu Love, and Arthur Ashley. Ashley also directed the film. It was a William A. Brady World Pictures production. It was marketed as containing "not one dull moment". The film was based on Arthur M. Brilant's play The Alibi. The film received generally positive reviews. A write-up in Motography describes it as a tense drama. One aspect of the plot is a father forbidding his son from seeing a young woman believed to have mixed ethnic heritage.

== Cast ==
- June Elvidge as Marcia Fleming
- Montagu Love as John Fleming
- Arthur Ashley as Arnold Curtis
- Pinna Nesbit as Corinne La Force
- Alec B. Francis as Henry Hasbrook
- Kate Lester as Signora Lester
- Arthur Matthews as Signora La Force
- Frances Miller as Mamma Liza
