= A Hungry Heart =

1917 film

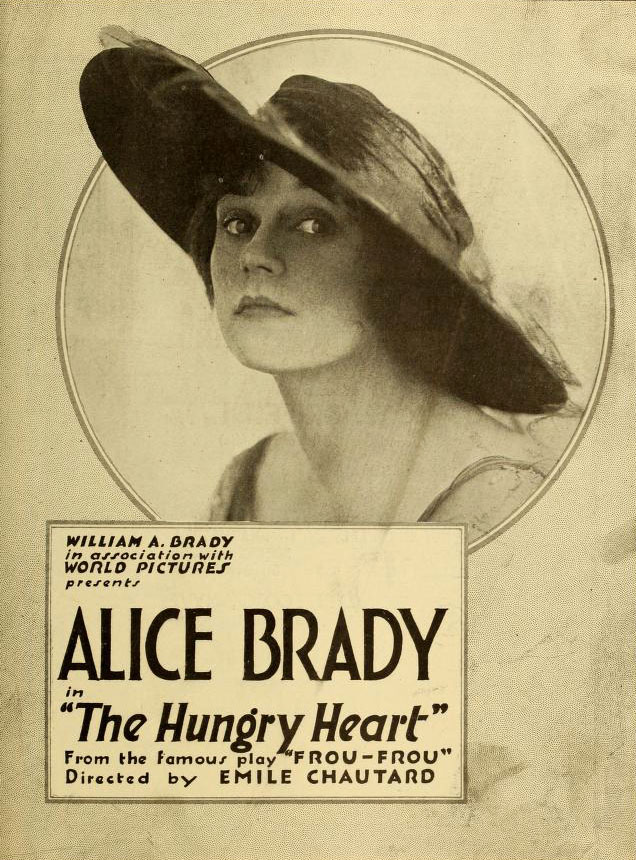
- film poster
- Directed by: Emile Chautard
- Written by: Frances Marion
- Based on: play, Frou-Frou, by Henri Meilhac and Ludovic Halevy
- Produced by: William A. Brady
- Starring: Alice Brady
- Cinematography: Lucien Tainguy
- Distributed by: World Film Corporation
- Release date: February 5, 1917
- Running time: 5 reels
- Country: USA
- Language: Silent (English intertitles)

A Hungry Heart is a 1917 silent film drama directed by Emile Chautard and starring Alice Brady. It was produced and distributed by World Film Corporation.

It is sometimes called The Hungry Heart but shouldn't be confused with the Pauline Frederick film of the same year. A Hungry Heart was adapted for the screen by Frances Marion based on a stage play titled Frou-Frou by Henri Meilhac and Ludovic Halevy, while the Frederick film was based on a 1909 novel called The Hungry Heart.

== Cast ==
- Alice Brady - Frou Frou
- Edward Langford - Comte Paul de Valreas
- George MacQuarrie - Marquis Henri de Sartorys
- Gerda Holmes - Louise Brigard
- Alec B. Francis - M. Brigard
- John Dudley - Baron de Combri
- Edna Whistler - Baronne de Combri
- Charles Harley - Pitou
- Josephine Earle - Pauline
- Horace Haine - Gaston
- Ray Carrara - Georgie de Sartorys
- Mathilde Brundage - Mother of Comte de Valreas

== Preservation ==
A Hungry Heart is currently presumed lost. In February of 2021, the film was cited by the National Film Preservation Board on their Lost U.S. Silent Feature Films list.

== See also ==
- The Toy Wife (1938)
