= Robert Broderick (actor) =

American silent film-era actor

Robert Broderick was an American actor in silent films and "light opera". He starred in Arizona.

Film companies he worked for include Thanhouser for one film and Dyreda Art Film.

He worked with Kinemacolor, Western Kalem (Eastern Branch), and Famous Players Company, and then the Dyreda Company, where he was leading man.

The Billboard wrote of his performance in The Redemption of David Corson (1914): "The character of Dr. Paracelsus [sic], as done by Robert Broderick, was remarkably realistic."

== Filmography ==
- King Rene's Daughter (1913), based on: King Rene's Daughter, title role
- Arizona (1913), as Henry Canby
- The Redemtion of David Corson (1914) as Dr. Parcelsus
- Jack the Giant Killer (1914), writer and actor in the Thanhouser film (see also: Jack the Giant Killer)
- One of Millions
- In the Name of the Prince of Peace
- The Better Man (1914), as Henry Wharton
- The White Pearl (1915), as Capt. Marvell
- Poor Schmaltz (1915), as Mr. Hocheimer
- Gambier's Advocate (1915)
- Arms and the Woman (1916), as Marcus
- Hit-The-Trail Holliday (1918), as Otto Wurst
- The Prince and the Pauper (1915), as The King
- Youth (1917), as James Goodwin
- Bridges Burned (1917), as Thomas O'Brien
- The Guardian (1917), as Chief Conlin
- Just for Tonight (1918), as Theodore 'Ted' Whitney Sr.
- The Bishop's Emeralds (1919), as Lord John Cardew
- The Rough Neck (1919), as Horace Masters
- The Eternal Mother (1920)
- Call of the Hills (1923)
