= Oh Mary Be Careful =

1921 film

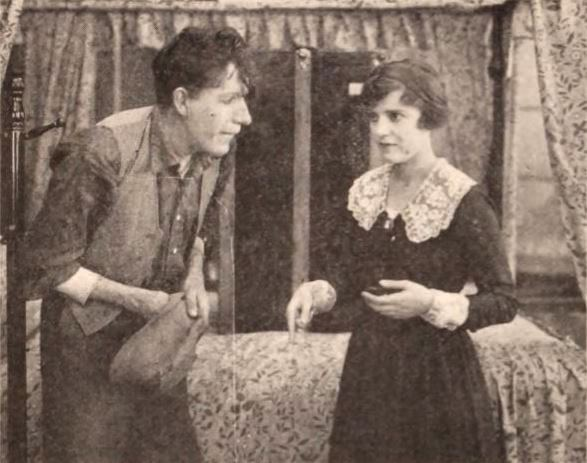
- Film still
- Directed by: Arthur Ashley
- Written by: George Weston (story, scenario); Rupert Hughes (intertitles)
- Produced by: Samuel Goldwyn
- Starring: Madge Kennedy
- Cinematography: William Fildew
- Production company: Goldwyn Pictures
- Distributed by: Pioneer Film Company
- Release date: September 1, 1921
- Running time: 50 minutes; 5 reels
- Country: United States
- Language: Silent (English intertitles)

Oh Mary Be Careful is an extant 1921 American silent comedy film produced by Goldwyn Pictures and released by an independent distributor. Stage actress Madge Kennedy stars in the film, which was directed by Arthur Ashley. A copy is preserved at the Library of Congress.

The film was allegedly shot several years earlier during 1917 and released in 1921 after the rights were acquired by Pioneer Film.

== Cast ==
- Madge Kennedy as Mary Meacham
- George J. Forth as Morgan Smith
- George S. Stevens as Judge Adams
- Bernard Thornton as Dick Lester
- A. Drehle as Doctor Chase
- Marguerite Marsh as Susie
- Harry Fraser as Professor Putnam
- Dixie Thompson as Luke
- May Rogers as Nellie Burns (credited as Mae Rogers)
- Kate Lester as Kathleen McEchran
- Harry Myers as Bobby Burns
- Marcia Harris as Myra Meacham

== Production ==
Exteriors for Oh Mary Be Careful were taken on location near Savannah, Georgia in late 1917.
