= Rick's Redemption =

- Starring: William Garwood; Muriel Ostriche
- Release date: December 1, 1913
- Running time: 28 minutes
- Country: United States
- Languages: Silent film English intertitles

Rick's Redemption is a 1913 American silent short film starring William Garwood and Muriel Ostriche.
