= Wife Against Wife =

1921 film

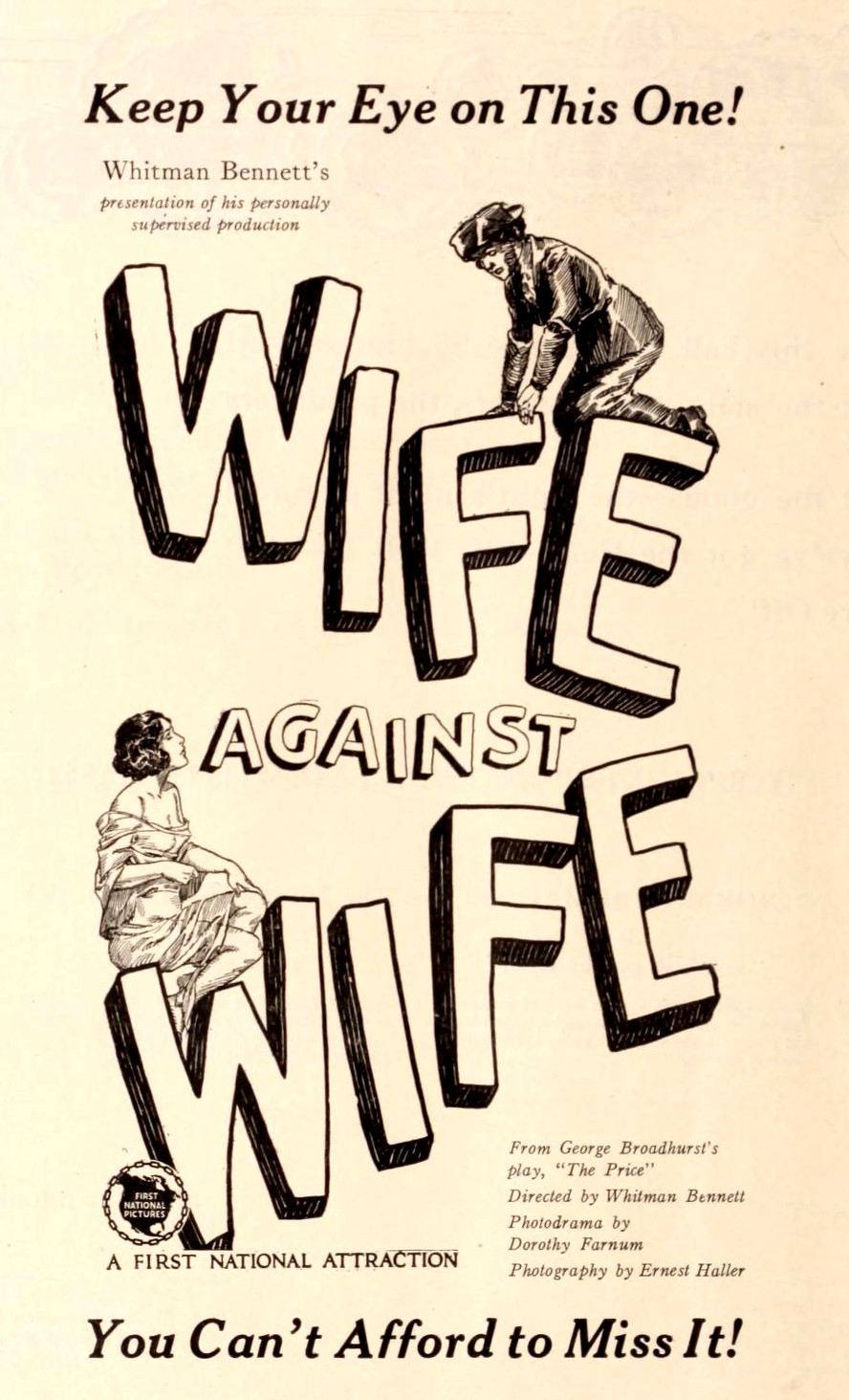
- Magazine advertisement
- Directed by: Whitman Bennett
- Screenplay by: Dorothy Farnum
- Based on: The Price by George Broadhurst
- Starring: Pauline Starke; Percy Marmont; Edward Langford; Emily Fitzroy; Ottola Nesmith
- Cinematography: Ernest Haller
- Production company: Whitman Bennett Productions
- Distributed by: Associated First National Pictures
- Release date: September 12, 1921
- Running time: 60 minutes
- Country: United States
- Language: English

Wife Against Wife is a 1921 American drama film directed by Whitman Bennett and written by Dorothy Farnum. It is based on the 1911 play The Price by George Broadhurst. The film stars Pauline Starke, Percy Marmont, Edward Langford, Emily Fitzroy and Ottola Nesmith. The film was released on September 12, 1921, by Associated First National Pictures.

== Cast ==
- Pauline Starke as Gabrielle Gautier
- Percy Marmont as Stannard Dole
- Edward Langford as Dr. Ethan Bristol
- Emily Fitzroy as Mrs. Dole
- Ottola Nesmith as Florence Bromley
