= The Rough Neck =

1919 silent film

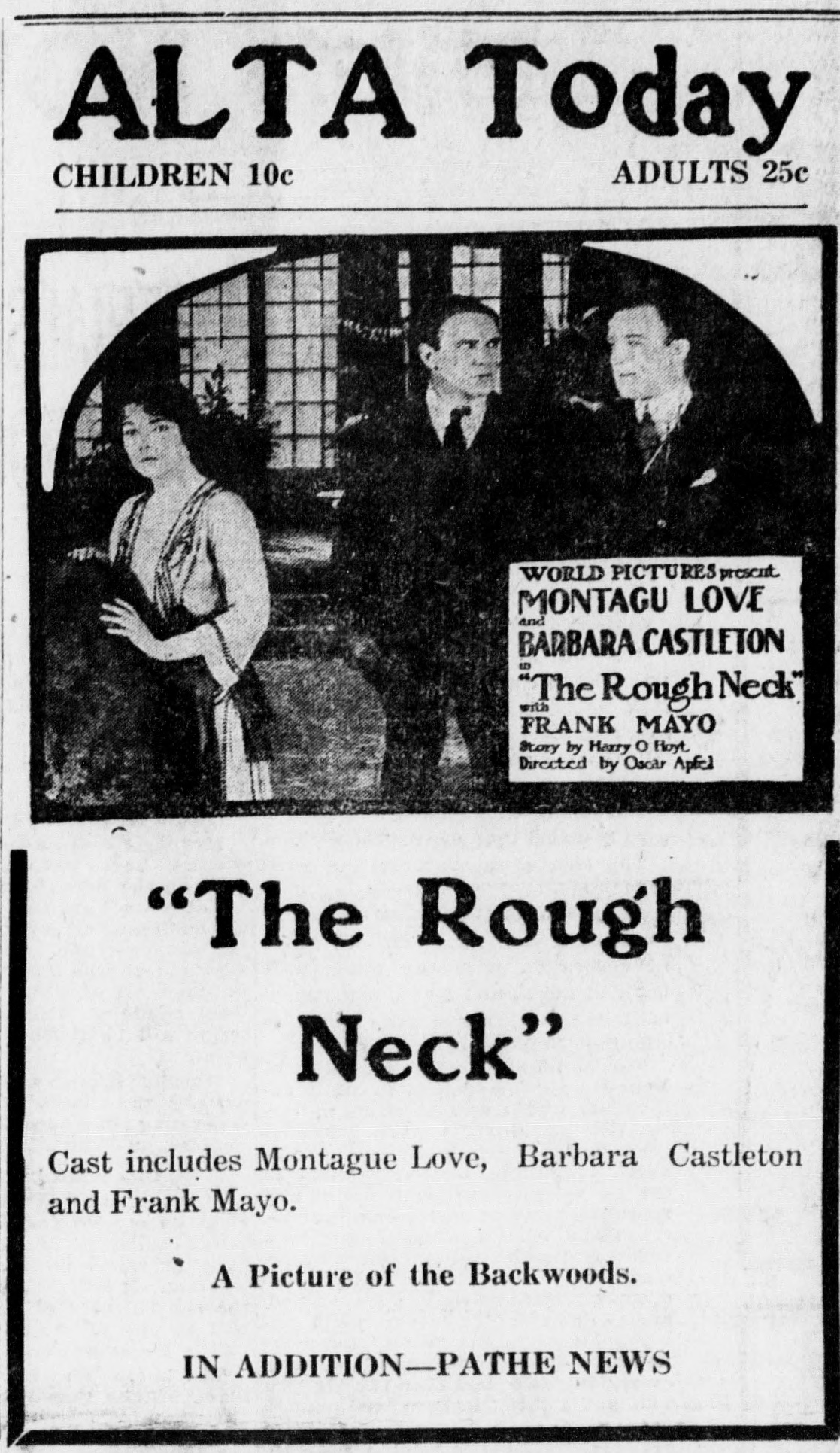
- Contemporary advertisement
- Directed by: Oscar Apfel
- Written by: Harry O. Hoyt
- Starring: Montagu Love; Robert Broderick; Barbara Castleton
- Cinematography: Alfred Gandolfi
- Production company: World Film
- Distributed by: World Film
- Release date: February 3, 1919
- Running time: 50 minutes
- Country: United States
- Languages: Silent; English intertitles

The Rough Neck is a 1919 American silent drama film directed Oscar Apfel and starring Montagu Love, Robert Broderick and Barbara Castleton.

== Cast ==
- Montagu Love as John Masters
- Robert Broderick as Horace Masters
- George De Carlton as Armitage
- Barbara Castleton as Frances
- Frank Mayo as Ellery Dale
- Al Hart as Ryan
- J. Gunnis Davis as Shark Smith
- Robert Milasch as Toning
- Holmes Herbert as A Half-Breed Indian

== Bibliography ==
- George A. Katchmer. Eighty Silent Film Stars: Biographies and Filmographies of the Obscure to the Well Known. McFarland, 1991.
