= The Page Mystery =

1917 film

- Directed by: Harley Knoles
- Written by: Frank R. Adams
- Produced by: William A. Brady
- Starring: Carlyle Blackwell; June Elvidge; Arthur Ashley
- Cinematography: Arthur Edeson
- Production company: Peerless Productions
- Distributed by: World Film
- Release date: April 30, 1917
- Running time: 50 minutes
- Country: United States
- Languages: Silent; English intertitles

The Page Mystery is a 1917 American silent mystery film directed by Harley Knoles and starring Carlyle Blackwell, June Elvidge and Arthur Ashley.

== Cast ==
- Carlyle Blackwell as Alan Winthrop
- June Elvidge as Edith Strong
- Frank Goldsmith as Montague Winthrop
- Alec B. Francis as Hon. Charles Winthrop
- Arthur Ashley as Ralph Cornwell
- Pinna Nesbit as Laura Le Moyle
- Al Hart as Saul Potter
- Charles W. Charles as Simeon Jagger
- Lila Chester as Kathleen Lorraine

== Bibliography ==
- Langman, Larry. American Film Cycles: The Silent Era. Greenwood Publishing, 1998.
