= The Guardian (1917 film) =

1917 film

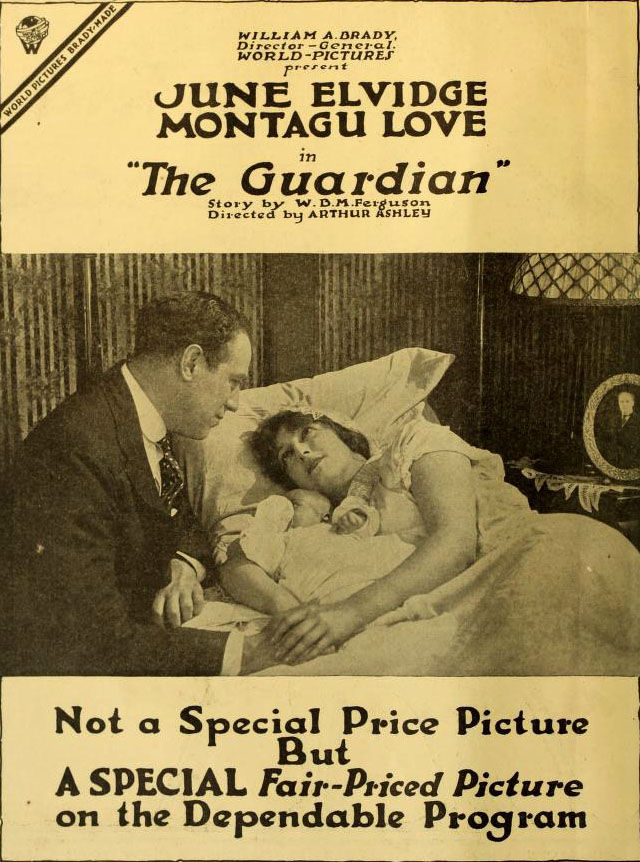
- Directed by: Arthur Ashley
- Written by: W. B. M. Ferguson
- Produced by: Peerless; World Film Company
- Starring: June Elvidge; Montagu Love; Arthur Ashley
- Cinematography: Jacques Montéran (fr)
- Distributed by: World Film Corporation
- Release date: September 1, 1917
- Running time: 5 reels
- Country: United States
- Language: Silent with English titles

The Guardian is a lost 1917 silent feature film directed by and starring Arthur Ashley, with June Elvidge and Montagu Love. It was produced by the Peerless Company and distributed by World Film Corporation.

== Cast ==
- Montagu Love - James Rokeby
- June Elvidge - Marie Dacre
- Arthur Ashley - Fenwick Harvey
- William Black - William Donavan
- Robert Broderick - Chief Conlin
