= The Amateur Detective =

- Directed by: Carroll Fleming
- Starring: Carey L. Hastings, Ernest C. Warde, Muriel Ostriche
- Production company: Thanhouser Company
- Distributed by: Mutual Film Corporation
- Release date: December 6, 1914
- Running time: 1 reel
- Country: United States
- Language: English

The Amateur Detective is a 1914 American silent short comedy directed by Carroll Fleming for the Thanhouser Film Corporation. The film stars Carey L. Hastings, Ernest C. Warde and Muriel Ostriche.

== Synopsis ==
Thanhouser literature describes it as "A laughable parody on Sherlock Holmes."

== History and preservation status ==
This film represented a subgenre of detective parodies common to the era of the Nickelodeon. It is preserved in the AFI/Alfred Bruzzese collection; the surviving print is only a fragment, consisting of 240 feet of the original 990-foot running length.
