= A Self-Made Widow =

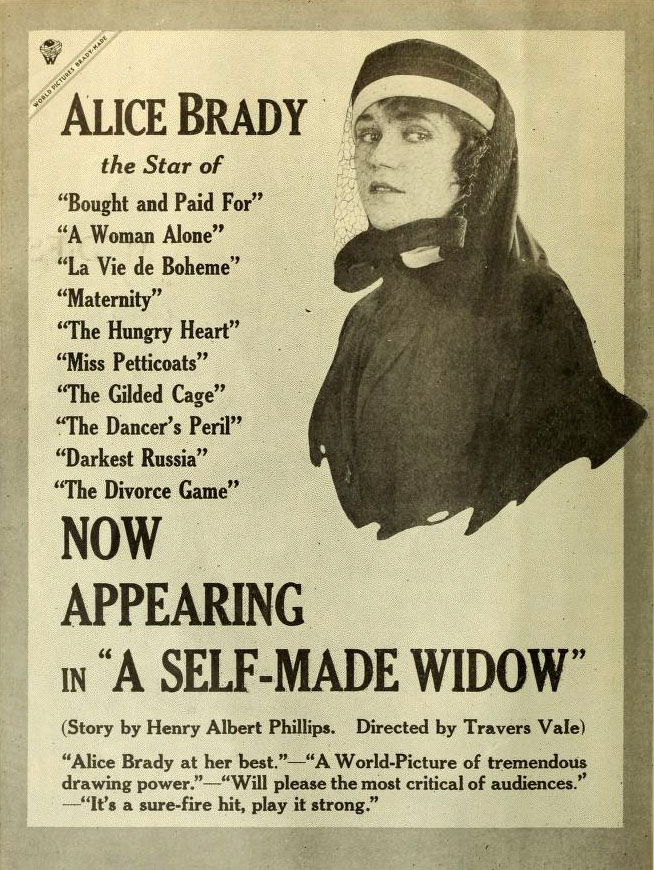
- contemporary advertisement
- Directed by: Travers Vale
- Based on: a play by Herbert Albert Phillips
- Produced by: William A. Brady; World Film Company
- Starring: Alice Brady
- Cinematography: Max Schneider
- Distributed by: World Film
- Release date: July 23, 1917
- Running time: 5 reels
- Country: USA
- Language: Silent...English intertitles

A Self-Made Widow is a lost 1917 silent film comedy drama directed by Travers Vale and starring Alice Brady.

== Cast ==
- Alice Brady - Sylvia
- John Bowers - Fitzhugh Castleton
- Curtis Cooksey - Bobs
- Justine Cutting - Semphronia Benson
- Henrietta Simpson - Lydia Van Dusen
- Herbert Barrington - Crosby
- Lila Chester - Della
