= The Battle of Frenchman's Run =

1915 film by Theodore Marston

- Directed by: Theodore Marston
- Written by: James Oliver Curwood; Theodore Marston
- Starring: Harry Carey
- Release date: March 18, 1915
- Country: United States
- Languages: Silent; English intertitles

The Battle of Frenchman's Run is a 1915 American comedy film featuring Harry Carey.

== Cast ==
- Harry Carey
- George Cooper
- Frank Currier
- J. Herbert Frank
- Dorothy Kelly
- Albert Roccardi
- Charles Wellesley
- Charles West (credited as Charles H. West)

== See also ==
- List of American films of 1915
- Harry Carey filmography
