= The Gilded Cage (1916 film) =

1916 film by Harley Knoles

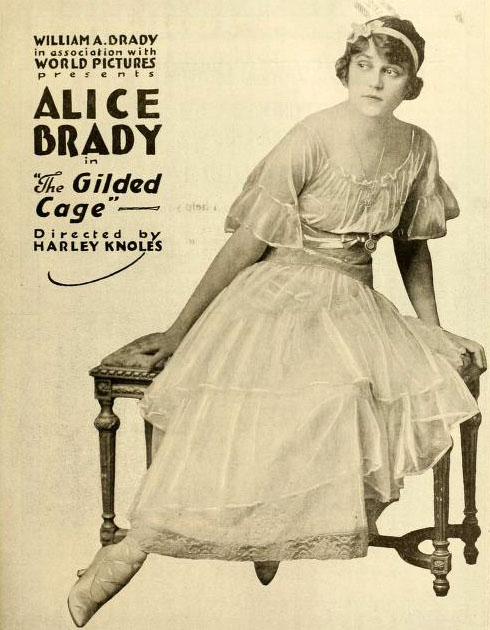
- Directed by: Harley Knoles
- Written by: Frances Marion (scenario)
- Based on: story by J. I. C. Clarke
- Produced by: World Film Corporation; Peerless; William A. Brady
- Starring: Alice Brady
- Cinematography: Arthur Edeson
- Distributed by: World Film
- Release date: October 9, 1916
- Running time: 50 minutes; 5 reels
- Country: USA
- Language: Silent..English titles

The Gilded Cage is a 1916 silent film drama directed by Harley Knoles and starring Alice Brady.

This film is preserved at the Library of Congress, Packard Campus for Audio-Visual Conservation.

== Cast ==
- Alice Brady - Princess Honore
- Alec B. Francis - King Comus
- Gerda Holmes - Queen Vesta
- Montagu Love - Baron Stefano
- Arthur Ashley - Capt. Kassari
- Sidney D'Albrook - Nickolai
- Clara Whipple - Lesbia the Goose Girl
- Irving Cummings - Prince Boris
