= Edward Elkas =

American actor

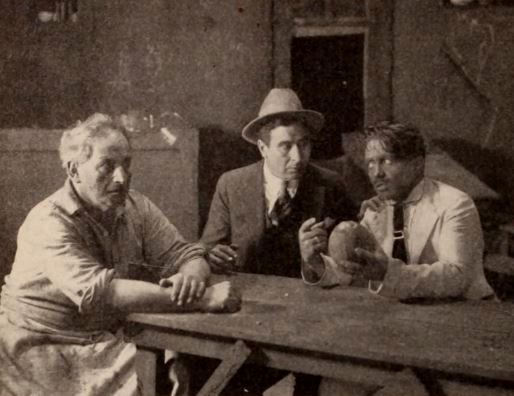
- Elkas (left) in The Mystery Mind (1920)
- Born: February 8, 1862; New York, New York, U.S.
- Died: December 17, 1933 (aged 71)
- Years active: 1911–1926

Edward Elkas (February 8, 1862 – December 17, 1933) was an American film actor of the silent era. He appeared in more than 80 films between 1911 and 1926. He was born in New York City. On Broadway, Elkas portrayed a headwaiter in A Tale of the Wolf (1925) and was assistant stage manager for The Wedding Day (1897).

== Selected filmography ==
- The Strange Story of Sylvia Gray (1914)
- The Foolish Virgin (1916)
- The Suspect (1916)
- The Enemy (1916)
- Aladdin's Other Lamp (1917)
- The Beloved Adventuress (1917)
- The Awakening of Ruth (1917)
- The Money Mill (1917)
- Moral Courage (1917)
- Womanhood, the Glory of the Nation (1917)
- The Blue Bird (1918)
- Joan of Plattsburg (1918)
- The Yellow Ticket (1918)
- Stolen Orders (1918)
- The Venus Model (1918)
- The Birth of a Race (1918)
- Hitting the Trail (1918)
- When Men Desire (1919)
- The Tower of Jewels (1919)
- The Woman Under Oath (1919)
- The House of the Tolling Bell (1920)
- Velvet Fingers (1920)
- The Way Women Love (1920)
- The Mystery Mind (1920)
- West of the Water Tower (1924)
- A Sainted Devil (1924)
- Too Much Money (1926)
