= The Dormant Power =

1917 film directed by Travers Vale

- Directed by: Travers Vale
- Written by: Clara Beranger; Florence Bolles
- Produced by: William A. Brady
- Starring: Ethel Clayton; Montagu Love; Muriel Ostriche
- Cinematography: Max Schneider
- Production company: Peerless Productions
- Distributed by: World Film
- Release date: October 22, 1917
- Running time: 5 reels
- Country: United States
- Languages: Silent; English intertitles

The Dormant Power is a 1917 American silent drama film, directed by Travers Vale and starring Ethel Clayton, Montagu Love and Muriel Ostriche.

== Plot ==
Christine Brent, seeks refuge with her father in a western village because of an unjust law. Maurice Maxwell, a wealthy ammunition manufacturer, comes to the village and becomes infatuated with Christine, wanting to take her east.

Carl Randolph, drifts into the town saloon during a Fourth of July celebration, and he shoots a Mexican man who disrespects an American flag. He flees and confesses to Catherine that he is a failure, and she gives him money to start his life anew.

After escaping, Randolph becomes a powerful attorney who is offered a position as General Counsel for the Maxwell Ammunition Company. He calls at Maxwell's house one night for business and sees Christine, who has become Maxwell's wife since Randolph fled, and has regretted her choice ever since.

The inventor, Brinkerhoff, delivers plans to Maxwell of a valuable invention. Maxwell is caught trying to plagiarize the documents and kills Brinkerhoff in the struggle, and tosses his body out of the window into the river.

Brinkerhoff's wife turns to Randolph for assistance. He sends her undercover as a maid in Maxwell's home, where she finds evidence of Brinkerhoff's murder. Mrs. Brinkerhoff, Maxwell's confession, shoots her husband's killer. At trial, the jury deliver a verdict of not guilty, and Christine and Randolph are happily reunited.

== Cast ==
- Ethel Clayton as Christine Brent
- Joseph Herbert as James Brent
- Edward Langford as Carl Randolph
- Montagu Love as Maurice Maxwell
- Muriel Ostriche as Metta
- George Morgan as Brinkerhoff

== Reception ==
Motography reviewer Helen Rockwell's review was positive, praising the story for being "handled with such finesse and care." Additional praise was given to Max Schneider's photography of the interiors, which were described as "showing all the gorgeous splendor of a wealthy eastern home."

Photoplay's short review was mostly negative, describing of the production "World has a wardrobe full of nice picture garments, but it insists upon draping them over the veriest old skeletons of past and gone melodramas that one can imagine."

Variety's review was mostly positive, finding the story unoriginal but capably handled by the director and cast. The reviewer described the cinematography as "well selected" and Ethel Clayton and Montagu Love's acting as standing "head and shoulders above the rest."

Wid's Films gave the film a negative review, calling the film's story "old stuff" and the photography "hazy." The only praise was saved for the acting of Ethel Clayton and Montagu Love, as the rest of the cast "failed to impress." The reviewer concluded their review by telling theater owners "I certainly would not book this if there was any chance of getting away from it."

== Preservation ==
A complete print of The Dormant Power is held by the EYE Filmmuseum.

== Bibliography ==
- Langman, Larry. American Film Cycles: The Silent Era. Greenwood Publishing, 1998.
