= The Men She Married =

1916 silent film

- Directed by: Travers Vale
- Written by: Harold Vickers (novel)
- Produced by: William A. Brady
- Starring: Gail Kane; Arthur Ashley; Montagu Love
- Cinematography: Philip Hatkin
- Production company: Peerless Productions
- Distributed by: World Film
- Release date: November 27, 1916
- Running time: 50 minutes
- Country: United States
- Languages: Silent; English intertitles

The Men She Married is a 1916 American silent drama film directed by Travers Vale and starring Gail Kane, Arthur Ashley and Montagu Love.

== Cast ==
- Gail Kane as Beatrice Raymond
- Arthur Ashley as Ralph Semple
- Montagu Love as Jerry Trainer
- Louise Bates as Ada Semple
- Muriel Ostriche as Edith Trainer

== Bibliography ==
- George A. Katchmer. Eighty Silent Film Stars: Biographies and Filmographies of the Obscure to the Well Known. McFarland, 1991.
