= Pinna Nesbit =

Canadian silent film actress

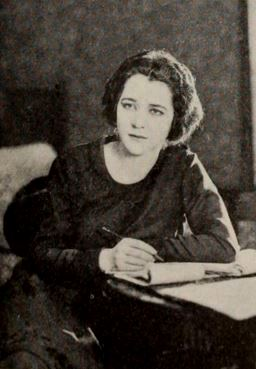
- Exhibitors Herald, 1919
- Born: November 26, 1896; Halifax, Nova Scotia, Canada
- Died: March 31, 1950 (aged 53); Santa Barbara, California, U.S.
- Occupation: Actress
- Spouses: Freddie Cruger; John Gaston

Pinna Nesbit (November 26, 1896 – March 31, 1950) was a Canadian silent film actress. She was married two times and had an affair with King Edward VIII, when he was Prince of Wales.

She was the daughter of Captain William A. Nesbit, a British army officer stationed in Toronto, Ontario, Canada.

Nesbit was married to haberdasher Freddie Cruger at the time of her affair with the Prince of Wales. Later she was married to John Gaston.

== Filmography ==
Year	Title	Director	Role
1917	The Page Mystery	Harley Knoles	Laura Le Moyle
1917	The False Friend	Harry Davenport	Marietta
1917	The Stolen Paradise	Harley Knoles	Katharine Lambert
1917	The Price of Pride	Harley Knoles	Madge Endicott Black
1917	The Beloved Adventuress	William A. Brady	Martha Grant
1917	The Little Duchess	Harley Knoles	Evelyn Carmichael
1917	Rasputin, the Black Monk	Arthur Ashley	Princess Sonia
1917	The Corner Grocer	George Cowl	Stella
1917	The Good for Nothing	Carlyle Blackwell	Clarice Laverne
1918	The Beautiful Mrs. Reynolds	Arthur Ashley	Mrs. Alexander Hamilton
1918	The Whims of Society	Travers Vale	Eleanor Van Schuyler
1918	Broken Ties	Arthur Ashley	Corinne La Force
1918	Let's Get a Divorce	Charles Giblyn	Yvonne de Prunelles
1918	Merely Players	Oscar Apfel	Maude Foster
1918	A Soul Without Windows	Travers Vale	Faith Palmer
1919	Bolshevism on Trial	Harvey Knoles	Barbara Bozenta
1920	Partners of the Night	Paul Scardon	Mary Regan
