= The Awakening (1917 film) =

1917 film directed by George Archainbaud

- Directed by: George Archainbaud
- Written by: Emil De Varney
- Produced by: William A. Brady
- Starring: Montagu Love; Dorothy Kelly; John Davidson
- Cinematography: Philip Hatkin
- Production company: Peerless Productions
- Distributed by: World Film
- Release date: December 3, 1917
- Running time: 5 reels
- Country: United States
- Languages: Silent; English intertitles

The Awakening is a 1917 American silent drama film directed by George Archainbaud and starring Montagu Love, Dorothy Kelly and John Davidson. Prints and/or fragments were found in the Dawson Film Find in 1978.

== Cast ==
- Montagu Love as Jacques Revilly
- Dorothy Kelly as Marguerite
- John Davidson as Horace Chapron
- Frank Beamish as Varny
- Joseph Granby as Prosper Chavassier
- Josephine Earle as Celestine

== Bibliography ==
- James Robert Parish & Michael R. Pitts. Film directors: a guide to their American films. Scarecrow Press, 1974.
