= Kate Lester =

British actress

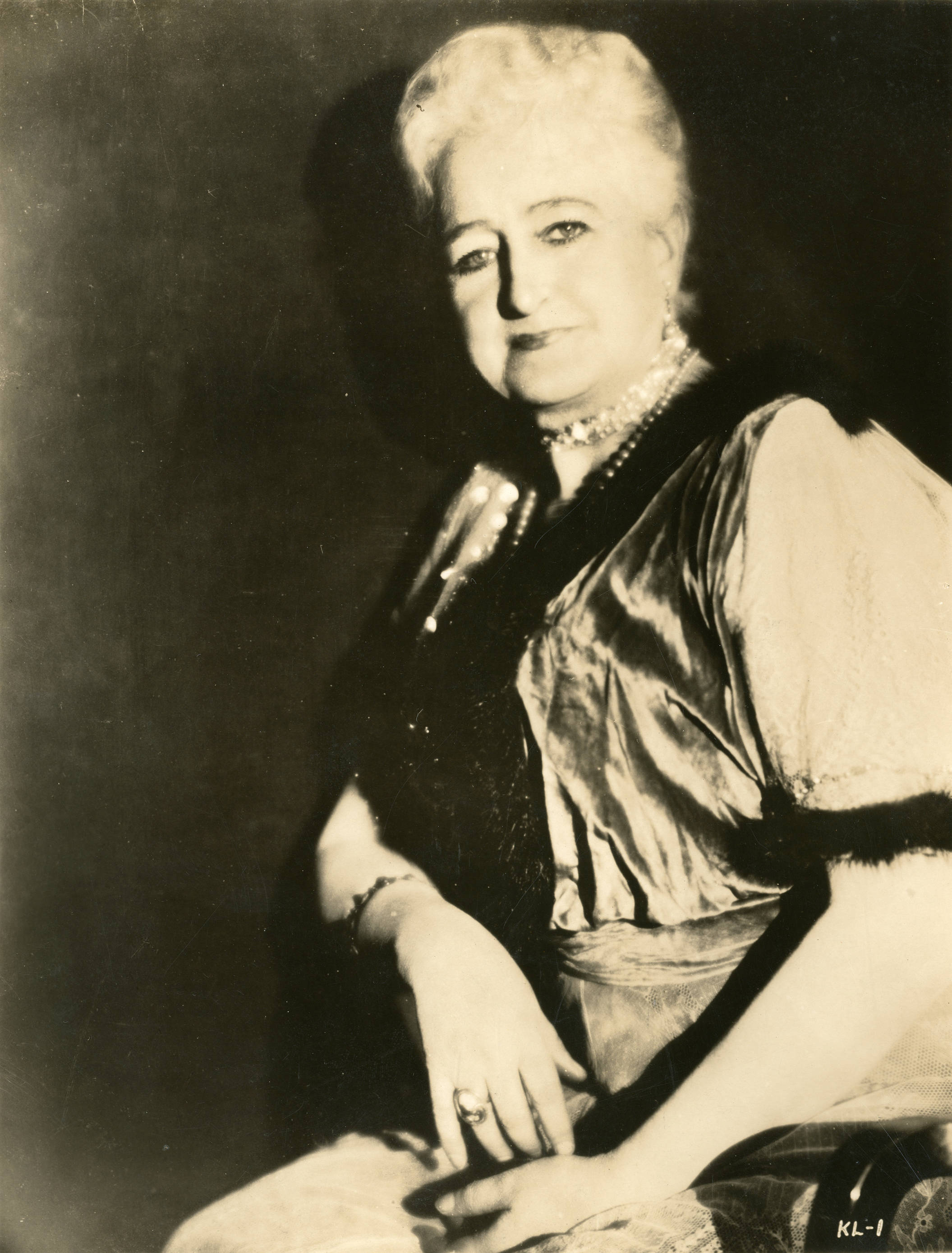
- Born: Sarah Cody; 12 June 1857; Shouldham Thorpe, Norfolk, England
- Died: 12 October 1924 (aged 67); Hollywood, California, US
- Occupation: Actress
- Years active: 1880–1924

Kate Lester (born Sarah Cody, 12 June 1857 – 12 October 1924) was an American theatrical and silent film actress. Her family, the Suydams of New York, were staying in Britain at the time of her birth.

== Early life ==
Lester was brought up in New York City and educated in the most exclusive schools. After completing her general education she studied dramatic art, which was the custom of the time. She studied drama under Dion Boucicault, a famed instructor.

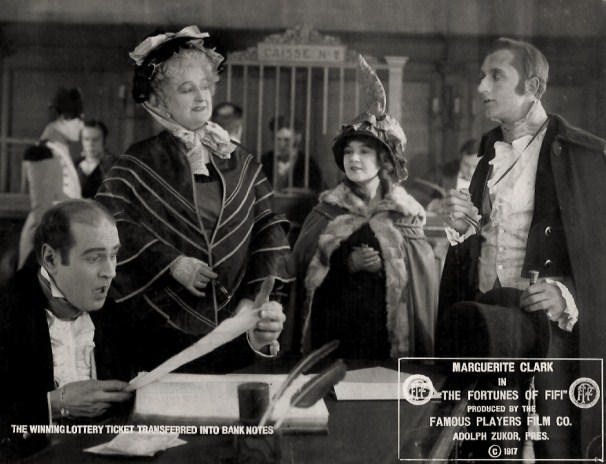
Lester and Marguerite Clark in The Fortunes of Fifi (1917)

== Stage and film actress ==
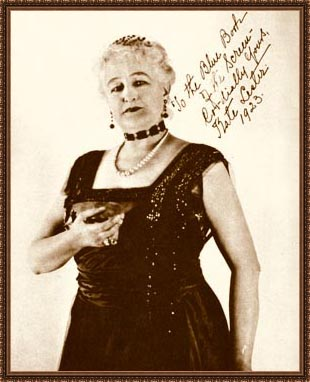
Kate Lester in 1923

Lester was a beauty of the stage in the late 19th century. Later she began to play maternal characters in films. It was as a grand dame that she made her debut on the New York stage. The woman scheduled to play Lady Silverdale in Partners became ill on the eve of the premiere. During Lester's stage career she acted with Richard Mansfield, John Drew Jr., William H. Crane, Mrs. Fiske, Robert B. Mantell, Henrietta Crosman, Julia Marlowe, Margaret Anglin and even James J Corbett.

Her first silent features were in 1916. The film titles are Molly Make-Believe, Destiny's Toy, The Social Secretary, The Kiss, and A Coney Island Princess. She also appeared in Black Oxen with Clara Bow. Lester's last films were released in 1925. They are The Meddler, Raffles, the Amateur Cracksman, and The Price of Pleasure.

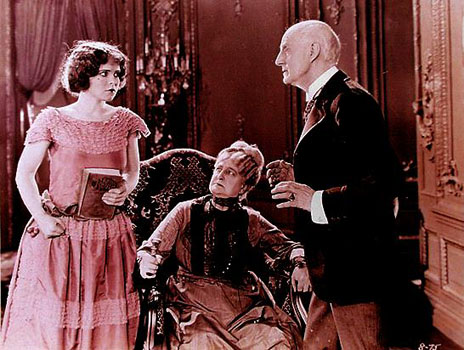
Clara Bow as Janet Oglethorpe, the flapper in Black Oxen, holding a copy of Flaming Youth. With Kate Lester and Tom Ricketts

She attained initial success in emotional roles. She began to develop her grand dame line of characters when her hair turned white prematurely.

== Death ==
Lester, at age 67, died from burns she sustained during an explosion inside her dressing room at Universal Studios in Hollywood in 1924. She was taken to Hollywood Hospital where she succumbed from burns to her hair, face, hands and upper body. She was taken to the emergency room unconscious. Studio personnel broke down the door to her dressing room. It was suspected that the connections to a gas stove in Lester's dressing room had been leaking. When she attempted to light the gas, an explosion followed.

Lester's body was removed to the J. W. Todd undertaking establishment in Culver City, California and cremated at Rosedale cemetery. In private life she was Mrs. Sarah Cody, and at the time of her death she resided at 7131 Bagley Avenue, Culver City.

== Filmography ==
- Molly Make-Believe (1916)
- Destiny's Toy (1916)
- The Reward of Patience (1916)
- The Social Secretary (1916)
- The Kiss (1916)
- A Coney Island Princess (1916)
- The Fortunes of Fifi (1917)
- God's Man (1917)
- Darkest Russia (1917)
- To-Day (1917)
- The Divorce Game (1917)
- Betsy Ross (1917)
- Adventures of Carol (1917)
- The Good for Nothing (1917)
- The Volunteer (1917)
- The Unbeliever (1918)
- Broken Ties (1918)
- His Royal Highness (1918)
- The Way Out (1918)
- The Cross Bearer (1918)
- The Reason Why (1918)
- The Heart of a Girl (1918)
- Annexing Bill (1918)
- The Golden Wall (1918)
- Doing Their Bit (1918)
- Little Women (1918)
- The Love Net (1918)
- The Crook of Dreams (1919)
- The Hand Invisible (1919)
- A Man and His Money (1919)
- The Stronger Vow (1919)
- The City of Comrades (1919)
- The Crimson Gardenia (1919)
- The Solitary Sin (1919)
- The City of Comrades (1919)
- Through the Wrong Door (1919)
- Upstairs (1919)
- Lord and Lady Algy (1919)
- Bonds of Love (1919)
- The Gay Lord Quex (1919)
- The Cup of Fury (1920)
- The Paliser Case (1920)
- The Woman in Room 13 (1920)
- Simple Souls (1920)
- Stop Thief! (1920)
- Earthbound (1920)
- Officer 666 (1920)
- Made in Heaven (1921)
- Don't Neglect Your Wife (1921)
- Oh Mary Be Careful (1921)
- Dangerous Curve Ahead (1921)
- The Hole in the Wall (1921)
- The Beautiful Liar (1921)
- The Fourteenth Lover (1922)
- Rose o' the Sea (1922)
- A Tailor-Made Man (1922)
- The Eternal Flame (1922)
- Remembrance (1922)
- One Week of Love (1922)
- Quincy Adams Sawyer (1922)
- The Glorious Fool (1922)
- Gimme (1923) as Mrs. Roland Ferris
- Can a Woman Love Twice? (1923)
- The Fourth Musketeer (1923)
- Modern Matrimony (1923)
- Her Accidental Husband (1923)
- The Love Trap (1923)
- The Hunchback of Notre Dame (1923)
- The Wild Party (1923)
- The Marriage Market (1923)
- The Rendezvous (1923)
- The Satin Girl (1923)
- Black Oxen (1923)
- Leave It to Gerry (1924)
- The Beautiful Sinner (1924)
- The Goldfish (1924)
- Beau Brummel (1924)
- The Beautiful Sinner (1924)
- Wife of the Centaur (1924)
- The Price of Pleasure (1925)
- Raffles, the Amateur Cracksman (1925)
- The Meddler (1925)
