= The Stolen Paradise =

1917 film by Harley Knoles

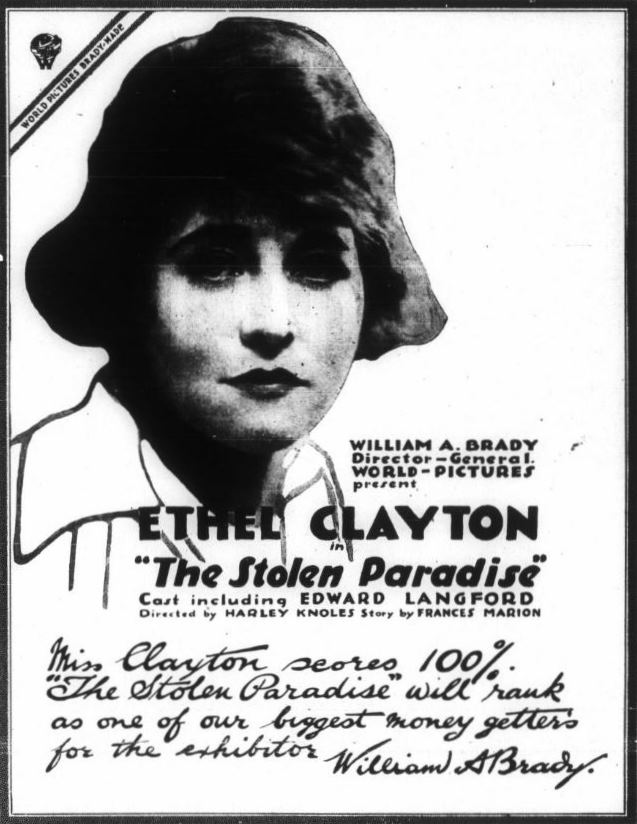
- Advertisement
- Directed by: Harley Knoles
- Written by: Frances Marion
- Produced by: William A. Brady
- Starring: Ethel Clayton; Edward Langford; Pinna Nesbit
- Cinematography: Arthur Edeson
- Production company: Peerless Pictures
- Distributed by: World Film
- Release date: June 18, 1917
- Running time: 50 minutes
- Country: United States
- Languages: Silent; English intertitles

The Stolen Paradise is a 1917 American silent drama film directed by Harley Knoles and starring Ethel Clayton, Edward Langford and Pinna Nesbit. Prints and/or fragments were found in the Dawson Film Find in 1978.

== Cast ==
- Ethel Clayton as Joan Merrifield
- Edward Langford as David Clifton
- Pinna Nesbit as Katharine Lambert
- George MacQuarrie as Kenneth Brooks
- Robert Forsyth as Doctor Crawley
- George Cowl as Basil Cairns
- Lew Hart as Jonathan Merrifield
- Edward Reed as Marquette
- Edwin Roe as Doctor Martin
- Ivan Dobble as Jacques Rigard
- Ed Brady as Leroux

== Bibliography ==
- Cari Beauchamp. Without Lying Down: Frances Marion and the Powerful Women of Early Hollywood. University of California Press, 1998.
