= Lila Chester =

American actress

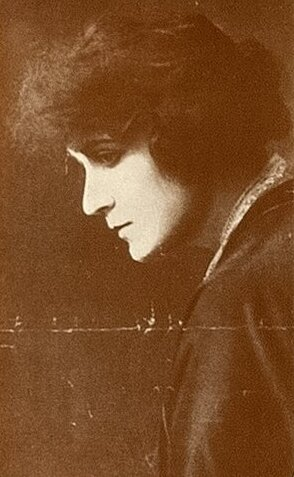
- Born: c. 1888; Richmond, Virginia, U.S.
- Occupation: Film actress
- Years active: 1912–1918

Lila Hayward Chester was an American actress.

Chester was born in Richmond, Virginia, and educated at the University of California. She followed a career in stock and vaudeville on the stage. Her middle name was rarely used in publicity.

Chester worked with P.A. Powers in 1911 and January 1912. Around the same time she also was an actress with Gaumont and Edison. Early in 1912, Chester moved to Thanhouser, for whom she played in many films through 1915.

In 1913 The New York Times named her "one of the prettiest girls of today" in a contest judged by artists who specialized in the so-called "American girl," including James Montgomery Flagg, C. Allen Gilbert, Clarence F. Underwood, and Penrhyn Stanlaws. In the same year, by arrangement with Thanhouser, she was seen in Sapho, a Majestic film starring Florence Roberts and Shelley Hull, produced in Los Angeles for release on the Mutual Program.

A publicist for Thanhouser, quoted in the Chicago Tribune, February 14, 1914, sad that by that time she had appeared in over 400 films. If most of these bore the Thanhouser label, then she must have played hundreds of minor roles, for Lila Chester appeared in relatively few film credits or publicity notices. Her most important role with Thanhouser was as Susan Farlow, companion to Florence LaBadie, in the extremely successful serial The Million Dollar Mystery.

Chester left Thanhouser toward the end of 1914. The New Rochelle Pioneer, June 19, 1915, reported: "Lila Chester has returned to the studio to work in screenplays." Her stay there was brief, and she moved to Fort Lee, New Jersey, in 1916 where she appeared in the August 1916 film Miss Petticoats, produced by Peerless Pictures for World Film Corporation. She remained with World and by 1918 had played roles in Sins of Society, The Unpardonable Sin, The Page Mystery, and A Self-Made Widow.

A 1918 directory noted that she was 5'5" tall, weighed 123 pounds, and had a fair complexion, titian hair, and blue eyes. Her home address at the time was 118 West 72nd Street, New York City, and she worked with the World Film Corporation in Fort Lee, New Jersey. Her hobbies were clothes making, embroidery, knitting, and other needlework.

Chester sued a John C. Epping in 1922, claiming that he had promised to marry both her and another woman. The suit was settled out of court in 1924. She had left acting in order to marry him and, at the conclusion of the suit, declared her intention to return.
