= The Fair Pretender =

1918 silent film directed by Charles Miller

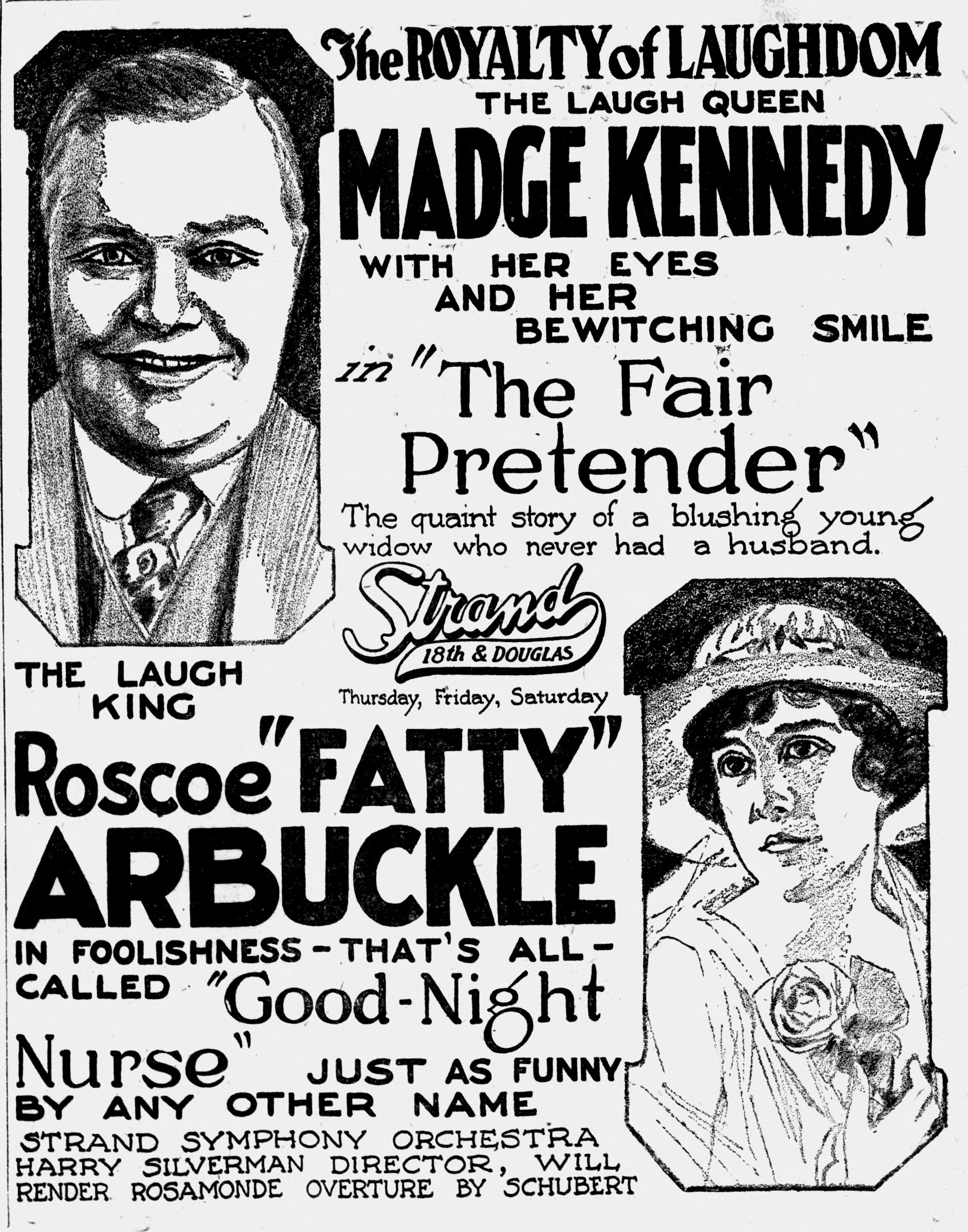
- Contemporary advertisement for the film and Good Night, Nurse!
- Directed by: Charles Miller
- Written by: Florence Bolles
- Starring: Madge Kennedy; Tom Moore; Robert Walker
- Cinematography: William E. Fildew
- Production company: Goldwyn Pictures
- Release date: May 18, 1918 (US)
- Running time: 5 reels
- Country: United States
- Language: Silent (English intertitles)

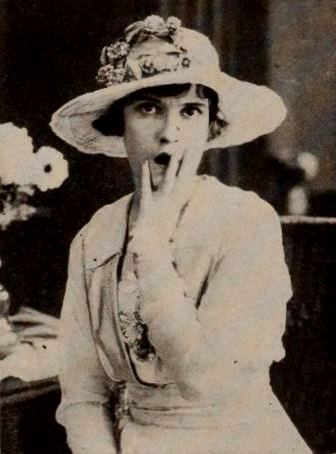
Madge Kennedy in the film

The Fair Pretender is a 1918 American silent drama film, directed by Charles Miller. It stars Madge Kennedy, Tom Moore, and Robert Walker, and was released on May 18, 1918.

== Plot ==
Sylvia Maynard is a typist in producer Townsend's office. To prove to him that she has acting ability, she goes to a society party, posing as "Mrs. Brown", the widow of a war hero. There, she meets several people, including Don Meredith, a playwright who is also posing as someone else, and Ramon Gonzales, a Brazilian who is, unbeknownst to the others at the party, a German spy.

Things are going well, and Don and Sylvia begin falling for one another, when suddenly Captain Milton Brown shows up. Don is crestfallen, and Sylvia is mortified, but Major Brown is more than willing to let the beautiful young woman continue her masquerade has his non-existent wife. Eventually, the entire scenario becomes too much for her, and she flees the party, but runs into Ramon on the train. She discovers that he has stolen important documents from the party's host, and she in turn steals them from him, returning to her apartment. Ramon tracks her down, but at the last moment, Don arrives and saves her.

== Cast list ==
- Madge Kennedy as Sylvia Maynard
- Tom Moore as Don Meredith
- Robert Walker as Harcourt
- Paul Doucet as Ramon Gonzales
- Wilmer Walter as Captain Milton Brown
- Emmett King as Townsend
- John Terry as Freddie
- Charles Slattery as Barnum
- Florence Billings as Marjorie Townsend
- Grace Stevens as Mrs. Townsend

== Reception ==
The New York Herald gave the film a very good review, "Madge Kennedy is a cinema synonym for excellence, and her latest picture, "The Fair Pretender", is no exception to the rule. She is as delightful as ever." They also complimented the acting of Tom Moore, especially the love scenes between the two. The Houston Post called the film a "sparkling comedy" and said, "Madge Kennedy, Goldwin [sic] Star, Makes Hit In New Play". The Sentinel-Record gave the picture a glowing review, calling it a "wonderful production". They extolled the film's star, "Fresh from her triumph in 'The Danger Game', in which she established herself once and for all as the princess royal of screen stars, Madge Kennedy Comes again to delight in 'The Fair Pretender', her newest Goldwyn photoplay. She is given ample opportunity in her latest starring vehicle to demonstrate her infinite variety and to captivate with her daintiness and charm. The Evening Mail also enjoyed the picture, extolling Kennedy's performance, "Madge Kennedy is seen at her best in her fifth Goldwyn production.

== Preservation status ==
- This film is listed as surviving in the Spanish archive: Instituto Valenciano De Cinematografia, Valencia, Spain.
