= Edward Langford =

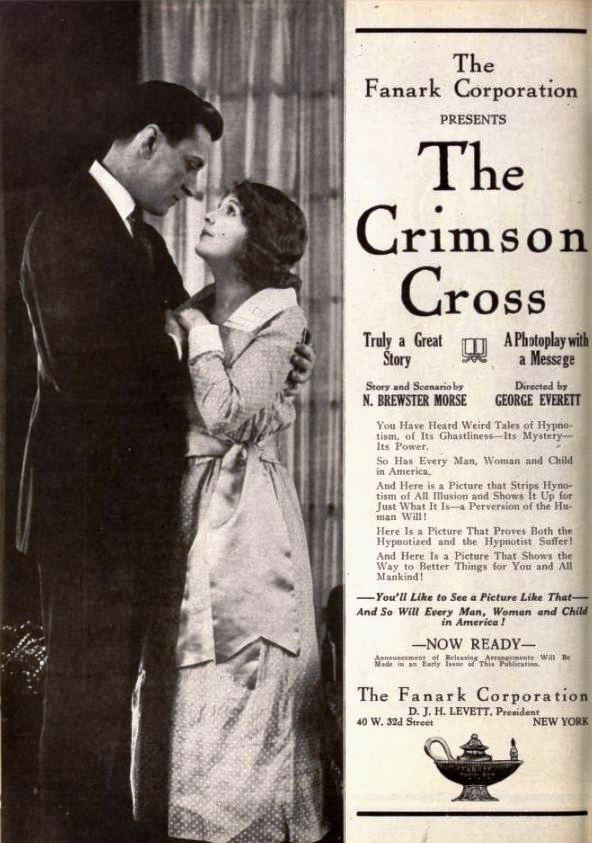
Langford with Marian Swayne in 1921 advertisement for The Crimson Cross

Edward Langford was an actor in American films and theater productions. He was paired in films with Alice Brady.

In the 1910s, Langford acted with a company headed by Eleanor Gordon.

== Filmography ==
- The Leopardess (1923)
- The Crimson Cross (1921)
- Peggy Puts It Over (1921)
- Wife Against Wife (1921)
- The Shadow of Rosalie Byrnes (1920)
- Women Men Forget (1920)
- The Volcano (1919)
- As Man Made Her (1917)
- The Stolen Paradise (1917)
- A Hungry Heart (1917)
- Yankee Pluck (1917)
- The Dormant Power (1917)
- The Iron Ring (1917)
- A Woman Alone (1917)
- On the Brink of Shame (1916)
