= Dorothy Kelly =

American actress

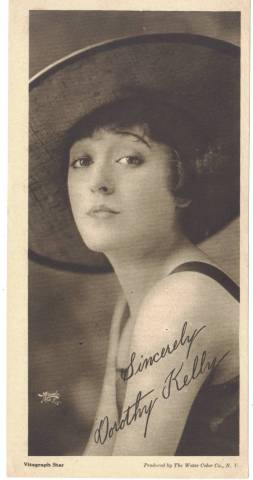
- Publicity photo from Motion Picture Magazine, 1916
- Born: February 12, 1894; Philadelphia, Pennsylvania, U.S.
- Died: May 31, 1966 (aged 72); Minneapolis, Minnesota, U.S.
- Occupation: Actress
- Years active: 1911–1917
- Spouse: Harvey Hevenor (m. 1916; died 1952)
- Children: 2

Dorothy Dupre Kelly (February 12, 1894 — May 31, 1966) was an American motion picture actress of the early silent film era.

== Personal life ==
Dorothy Dupre Kelly was born in Philadelphia, Pennsylvania to Bessie Irene Kelly (née Smith) and Thomas Kelly, descendants of Irish Quakers. She had a sister, Marguerite Kelly.

In August 1916, she married wealthy lumber dealer Harvey Hevenor. In 1922, she gave birth to twin daughters, Ann and Bessie, one of whom later became a portrait painter. She died of a cerebral hemorrhage in Minneapolis, Minnesota in 1966.

== Career ==
After attending the National Academy of Design and earning a position in a publishing firm, Kelly decided to give up her career as an illustrator. Seeking more lucrative work, she decided to become a performer and, despite having no previous acting experience, applied for a position in the stock company at Vitagraph, signing a contract in the early teens. Her first film was a bit part in a 30-minute version of A Tale of Two Cities in 1911, which also featured future silent stars Norma Talmadge and Mabel Normand. She continued to make 70 films with Vitagraph and during these years she played opposite almost all of the Vitagraph comedians, including John Bunny and his successor Hughie Mack, as well as child star Bobby Connelly.

Like many stars of early film, Kelly's career dwindled with the popularity of two-reelers. She would leave film altogether after the filming of Vitagraph serial The Secret Kingdom in 1917.

== Filmography ==
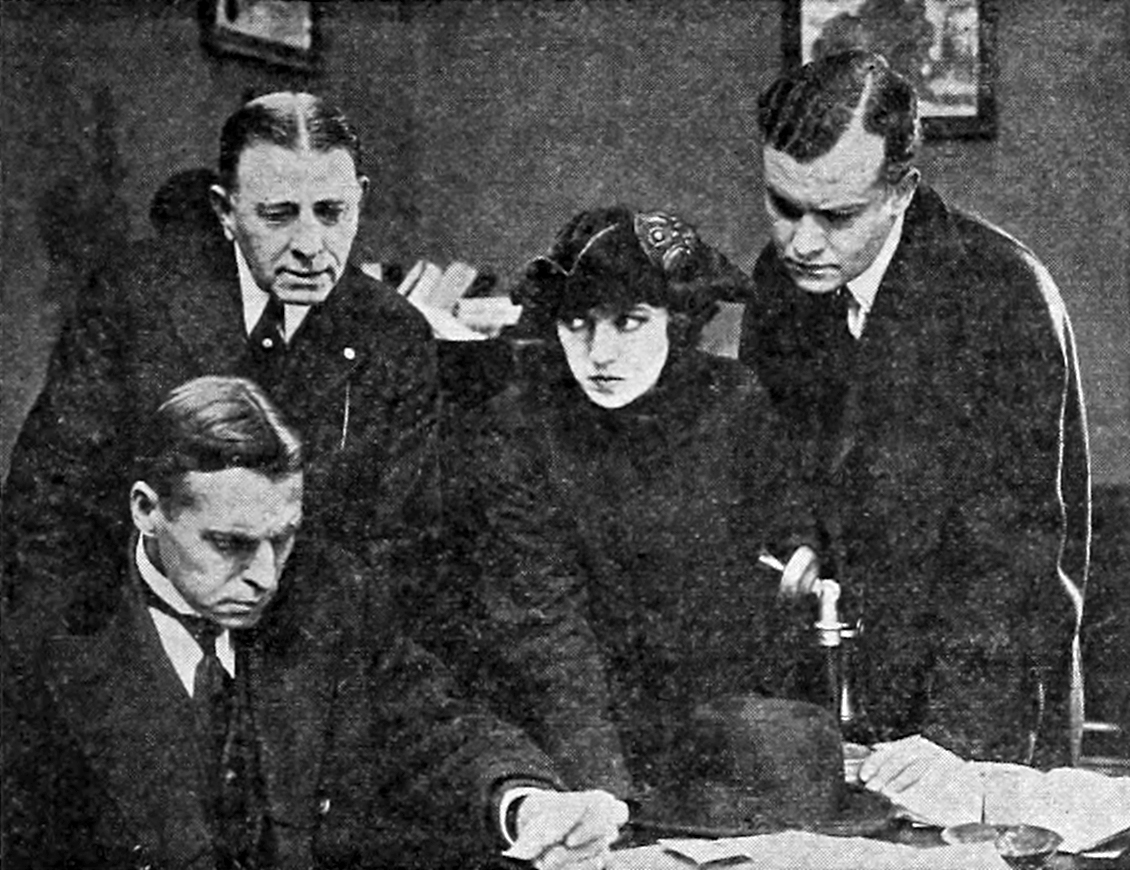
Kelly in The Money Mill (1917)

- The Awakening (1917) .... Marguerite
- The Maelstrom (1917) .... Peggy Greye-Stratton... aka Millionaire Hallets' Adventure (USA)
- The Money Mill (1917) .... Helen Ogden
- The Secret Kingdom (1916) .... Madame Savatz
- The Scarlet Runner (1916) .... Miss Collingwood
- The Law Decides (1916) .... Florence Wharton
- Artie, the Millionaire Kid (1916) .... Annabelle Willowby
- Salvation Joan (1916) .... Madeline Elliston
- The Supreme Temptation (1916) .... Annette
- From Out of the Big Snows (1915)
- The Wheels of Justice (1915) .... Julia Dean
- Four Grains of Rice (1915)
- The Awakening (1915)
- A Wireless Rescue (1915)
- The Battle of Frenchman's Run (1915)
- Twice Rescued (1915)
- Mother's Roses (1915) .... Helen Morrison
- In the Days of Fanny (1915)
- My Lost One (1915)
- Pawns of Mars (1915)
- Forcing Dad's Consent (1914)
- The Greater Love (1914)
- Within an Ace (1914)
- A Double Error (1914)
- The Unwritten Play (1914)
- The Wheat and the Tares (1914)
- The Greater Motive (1914)
- The Apple (1914)
- The Toll (1914)
- Two Stepchildren (1914)
- The Crime of Cain (1914)
- The Antique Engagement Ring (1914)
- Sonny Jim at the North Pole (1914)
- The Vanity Case (1914)
- An Easter Lily (1914)
- 'Fraid Cat (1914)
- The Drudge (1914)
- The First Endorsement (1914)
- Sonny Jim in Search of a Mother (1914)
- The Flirt (1913)
- The Tables Turned (1913)
- The Glove (1913) .... The Wife
- An Unwritten Chapter (1913)
- The Snare of Fate (1913) .... Marion Marbury
- An Infernal Tangle (1913)
- A Modern Psyche (1913) .... June
- Tricks of the Trade (1913)
- Disciplining Daisy (1913) .... Daisy
- Bunny Versus Cutey (1913)
- Playing with Fire (1913) .... Marion Harrington
- Bunny's Honeymoon (1913) .... Dorothy
- O'Hara's Godchild (1913) .... Mrs. Tom O'Grady
- The Weapon (1913)
- The Skull (1913)
- Ma's Apron Strings (1913) .... Molly Bush
- My Lady of Idleness (1913)
- All for a Girl (1912) .... Claire Taylor
- O'Hara, Squatter and Philosopher (1912) .... Aileen Sullivan
- The Model for St. John (1912)
- Bettina's Substitute; or, There's No Fool Like an Old Fool (1912)
- None But the Brave Deserve the Fair (1912)
- The Counts (1912) .... Gladys
- Popular Betty (1912) .... A Jealous Rival
- The Lovesick Maidens of Cuddleton (1912) .... One of the Lovesick Maidens
- Rip Van Winkle (1912/I) .... Steenie As An Adult
- Suing Susan (1912) .... The Maid
- Aunty's Romance (1912) .... A Stenographer
- The Troublesome Step-Daughters (1912) .... A Step-Daughter
- On the Pupil of His Eye (1912) .... The Senator's Ward
- Pseudo Sultan (1912) .... A Dancer
- A Tale of Two Cities (1911)
