= The False Friend =

1917 American silent drama film

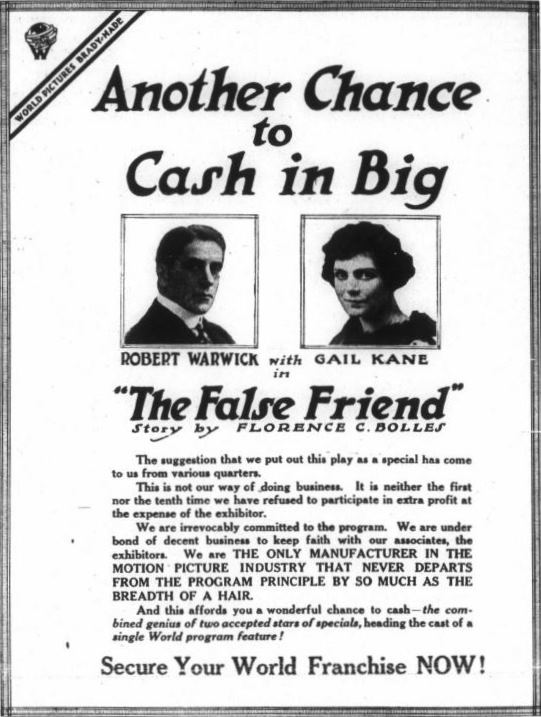
- Promotion of film in Variety, 1917
- Directed by: Harry Davenport
- Written by: Florence Bolles
- Produced by: William A. Brady
- Starring: Robert Warwick; Gail Kane; Jack Drumier
- Cinematography: Philip Hatkin
- Production company: World Film
- Distributed by: World Film
- Release date: June 11, 1917
- Running time: 5 reels
- Country: United States
- Languages: Silent; English intertitles

The False Friend is a 1917 American silent drama film directed by Harry Davenport and starring Robert Warwick, Gail Kane and Jack Drumier.

== Cast ==
- Robert Warwick as William Ramsdell
- Gail Kane as Virginia Farrell
- Jack Drumier as Robert Farrell
- Earl Schenck as De Witt Clinton
- P.J. Rollow as J. Carleton Clinton
- Lewis Edgard as Byron
- Pinna Nesbit as Marietta

== Reception ==
The New York Clipper's review was mixed, the reviewer found the cinematography and detail to be excellent but found the story to be strained. Elaborating, the reviewer said "the overtax on its sympathy and the long strain of worry imposed upon it by multiplied acts of villainy in the picture, will outbalance the interest the film excites."

== Bibliography ==
- James Robert Parish. Hollywood character actors. Arlington House, 1978.
