= Moral Courage (film) =

1917 film

- Directed by: Romaine Fielding
- Written by: Stanley Dark
- Produced by: William A. Brady
- Starring: Muriel Ostriche; Arthur Ashley; Edward Elkas
- Cinematography: Philip Hatkin
- Production company: World Film
- Distributed by: World Film
- Release date: May 14, 1917
- Running time: 5 reels
- Country: United States
- Languages: Silent; English intertitles

Moral Courage is a 1917 American silent drama film directed by Romaine Fielding and starring Muriel Ostriche, Arthur Ashley and Edward Elkas.

== Cast ==
- Muriel Ostriche as Mary McClinton
- Arthur Ashley as Chadwick Anson
- Edward Elkas as Joshua Anson
- Clarence Elmer as Willie McDonald
- Robert Forsyth as Angus McClinton
- Julia Stuart as Nancy Somers
- Richard Turner as Baggot
- Edmund Cobb as Walter Green

== Bibliography ==
- Langman, Larry. American Film Cycles: The Silent Era. Greenwood Publishing, 1998.
