= The Venus Model =

1918 American silent romantic comedy film

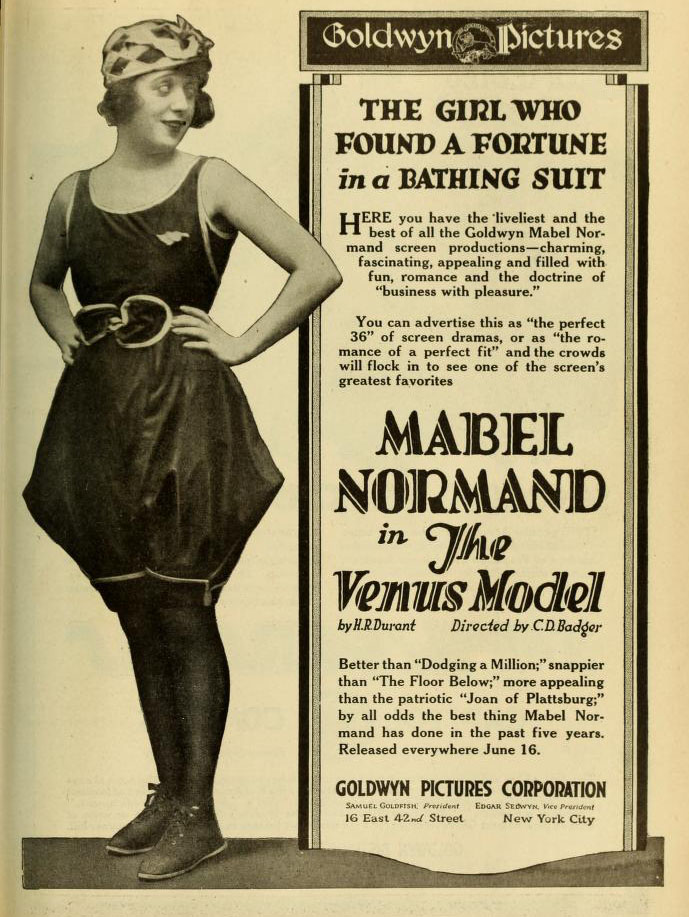
- 1918 advertisement
- Directed by: Clarence G. Badger
- Starring: Mabel Normand
- Cinematography: J.C. Bitzer
- Distributed by: Goldwyn Pictures
- Release date: June 16, 1918
- Running time: 50 minutes
- Country: United States
- Language: Silent (English intertitles)

The Venus Model is a 1918 American silent romantic comedy film starring Mabel Normand and directed by Clarence G. Badger. The film was made at Goldwyn Studios in Fort Lee, New Jersey. It is not known whether the film currently survives, and it may be a lost film.

== Plot ==
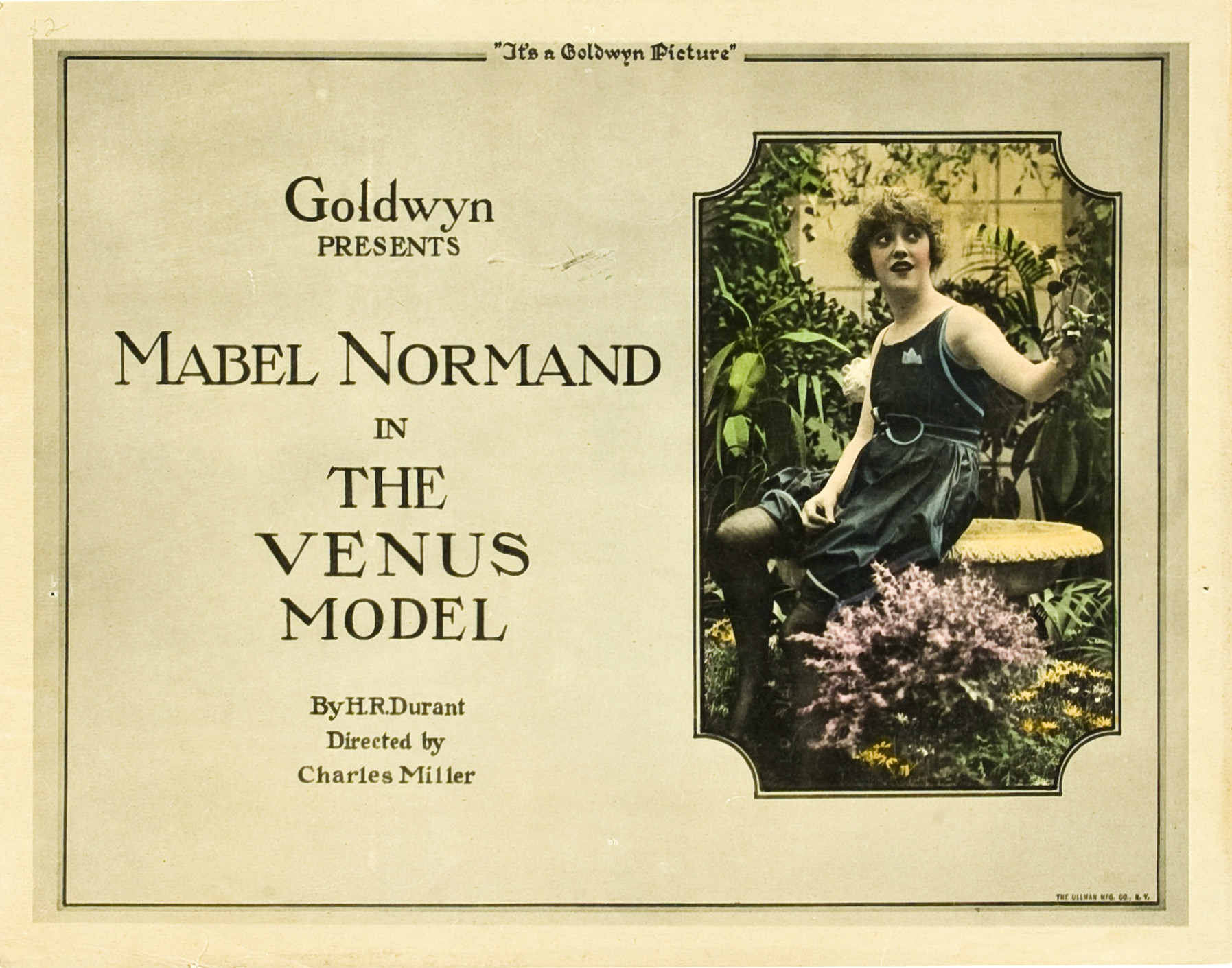
Lobby card for the American comedy romance film The Venus Model (1918)

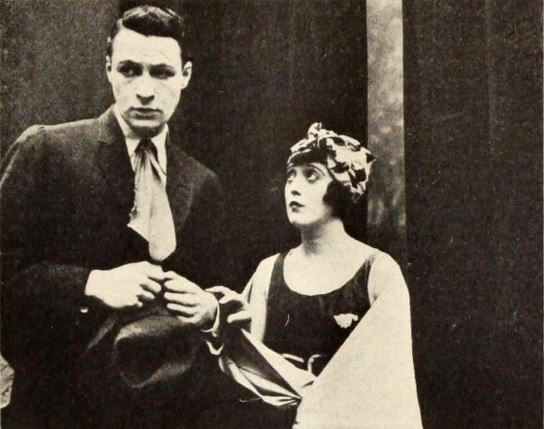
Rod La Rocque and Mabel Normand

As described in a film magazine, Kitty O'Brien, a seamstress in the factory of Braddock & Co., in an effort to escape punishment from the foreman she had mimicked, flees into the manager's office. While explaining her presence she shows a bathing suit she has designed, John Braddock embraces the idea and the display of the suit brings orders galore. When Braddock is compelled to take a rest, Kitty takes charge of the plant. She gives a young male applicant a job as office boy, but discovers he is the son of her employer, Paul Braddock, expelled from college. She frees him from an indiscreet love affair and, with the return of the elder Braddock, a romance is culminated.

== Cast ==
- Mabel Normand as Kitty O'Brien
- Rod La Rocque as Paul Braddock
- Alec B. Francis as John Braddock
- Alfred Hickman as Nathan Bergman
- Edward Elkas as Briggs
- Edward Boulden as Bagley
- Albert Hackett as Boy
- Una Trevelyn as Hattie Fanshawe
- Nadia Gary as 'Dimples' Briggs

== Reception ==
Like many American films of the time, The Venus Model was subject to restrictions and cuts by city and state film censorship boards. For example, the Chicago Board of Censors cut, in Reel 4, the intertitle "Well, you be at my apartment tonight and dig up $10,000".
