= Muriel Ostriche =

American actress

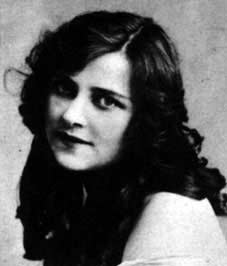
- Born: Muriel Henrietta Oestrich; May 24, 1896; New York City, U.S.
- Died: May 3, 1989 (aged 92); St. Petersburg, Florida, U.S.
- Years active: 1912–1921

Muriel Ostriche (born Muriel Henrietta Oestrich, May 24, 1896 – May 3, 1989) was an American silent film actress.

Following tryouts with the Biograph and Pathe studios, Ostriche signed with Eclair for $5 per day. After a year and a half with Eclair, she joined Reliance for a higher salary. Next she was signed by the Thanhouser Company based in New Rochelle, New York. She starred in 134 films in her career. Ostriche told author Michael G. Ankerich that A Daughter of the Sea (1915) was her best performance and her favorite film.

In 1920, Ostriche was featured in advertising for Bonnie-B veils.

She was living in Florida in the mid-1980s when author Q. David Bowers began researching a biography on Ostriche, which became Muriel Ostriche: Princess of Silent Films. He was shocked to discover that she was still living and a willing interview subject. She enjoyed a revival in her fame in the later portion of her life which she relished and because of this renewed interest, her own insights into her life are preserved today.

In 1913, she was photographed with other Thanhouser personnel on a Huguenots' Celebration float in New Rochelle.

== Selected filmography ==
- Robin Hood (1912)
- Rick's Redemption (1913)
- The House in the Tree (1913)
- The Ten of Spades (1914)
- The Amateur Detective (1914)
- When Fate Rebelled (1915)
- A Daughter of the Sea (1915)
- Check No. 130 (1915)
- Mortmain (1915)
- Kennedy Square (1916)
- The Men She Married (1916)
- The Dormant Power (1917)
- Moral Courage (1917)
- The Good for Nothing (1917)
- A Square Deal (1917)
- Youth (1917)
- The Volunteer (1917)
- The Purple Lily (1918)
- Hitting the Trail (1918)
- Tinsel (1918)
- Merely Players (1918)
- The Road to France (1918)
