= In the Latin Quarter =

- Directed by: Lionel Belmore
- Written by: Florence Bolles
- Produced by: Vitagraph Company of America
- Starring: Edith Storey; Antonio Moreno
- Distributed by: Vitagraph
- Release date: January 2, 1915
- Running time: 2 reels
- Country: USA
- Language: Silent..English intertitles

In the Latin Quarter is a 1915 silent short film directed by Lionel Belmore and starring Edith Storey and Antonio Moreno. It was produced and distributed by the Vitagraph Company of America.

The film survives incomplete in the Library of Congress collection.

== Cast ==
- Edith Storey - Marie Duval
- Antonio Moreno - Andrew Lenique
- S. Rankin Drew - Jean Duval (*as Sidney Rankin Drew)
- Constance Talmadge - Manon
- William R. Dunn
