= A Woman Alone (1917 film) =

1917 film directed by Harry Davenport

- Directed by: Harry Davenport
- Written by: Willard Mack; Frances Marion
- Produced by: William A. Brady
- Starring: Alice Brady; Edward Langford; Edward Kimball
- Cinematography: Arthur Edeson
- Production company: World Film
- Distributed by: World Film
- Release date: January 1, 1917
- Running time: 50 minutes
- Country: United States
- Languages: Silent; English intertitles

A Woman Alone is a 1917 American silent drama film directed by Harry Davenport and starring Alice Brady, Edward Langford and Edward Kimball.

== Cast ==
- Alice Brady as Nellie Waldron
- Edward Langford as Tom Blaine
- Edward Kimball as Rufus Waldron
- Justine Cutting as Samantha
- Arthur Ashley as Stephen Mallery Jr
- Clarence Harvey as Stephen Mallery
- Walter Greene as Michael Flynn

== Bibliography ==
- Cari Beauchamp. Without Lying Down: Frances Marion and the Powerful Women of Early Hollywood. University of California Press, 1998.
