= Arthur Ashley =

American actor

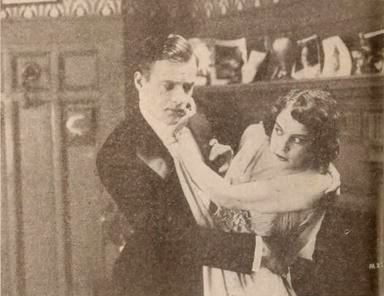
- Film still of Ashley and Gerda Holmes in The Iron Ring (1916)
- Born: October 6, 1886
- Died: December 28, 1970 (aged 84)
- Occupations: Actor; writer; film director

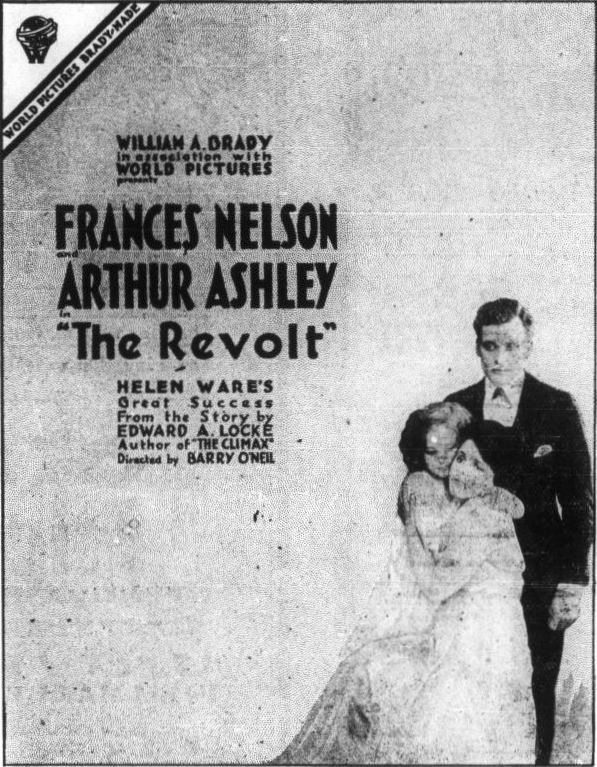
Advertisement for The Revolt (1916)

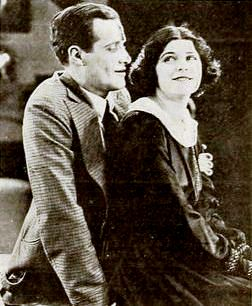
Still of Ashley with Dorothy Green in The Praise Agent (1919)

Arthur Ashley (October 6, 1886 – December 28, 1970) was an actor, writer, and director of silent films and also acted in legitimate theater. He was involved with World Pictures. He directed and acted in several film productions. Later in his career he established his own stock company for theatrical productions.

His starring roles included The Guardian.

He worked with William A. Brady's daughter Alice Brady on several projects.

He was also the manager of the Percy Williams Actors' Home.

== Filmography ==
=== Actor ===
- The Price of Vanity (1914) as Dick Arnold
- The Strange Story of Sylvia Gray (1914) as Vanveldt
- When a Woman Loves (1915) as Edgar Lowe
- The Little Mademoiselle (1915) as Jim Pemberton
- Sealed Lips (1915) as Cyril Maitland
- The Grubstaker (1916)
- The Gilded Cage (1916) as Capt. Kassari
- The Revolt (1916) as John Stevens
- The Summer Girl (1916) as Bruce Haldeman
- The Men She Married (1916) as Ralph Semple
- Tangled Fates (1916) as George Blake
- The Struggle (1916) as Lt. Leonard Dames
- What Happened at 22 (1916) as Dave Wilson/Andrew Hart
- Miss Petticoats (1916) as Guy Hamilton
- The Page Mystery (1917) as Ralph Cornwell
- The Social Leper (1917) as Robert Warren
- Shall We Forgive Her? (1917) as Neil Garth
- The Bondage of Fear (1917) as Skinny Morgan
- The Divorce Game (1917) as Jean Le Beau
- The Marriage Market (1917)
- The Iron Ring (1917) as Jack Delamore
- Moral Courage (1917) as Chadwick Anson
- A Woman Alone (1917) as Stephen Mallery, Jr.
- The Guardian (1917) as Fenwick Harvey
- The Marriage Market (1917) as Bradley Spayden
- Rasputin, the Black Monk (2017) as Raff
- The Beautiful Mrs. Reynolds (1918) as Aaron Burr
- Broken Ties (1918) as Arnold Curtis
- The American Way (1919) as Richard Farrington
- The Praise Agent (1919) as Jack Bartling
- Forest Rivals (1919) as Tom King
- Breaking Home Ties (1922) as Paul Zeidman

=== Director ===
- The Guardian (1917)
- The Marriage Market (1917)
- Rasputin, the Black Monk (1917)
- Shall We Forgive Her? (1917)
- The Beautiful Mrs. Reynolds (1918)
- Broken Ties (1918)
- Oh Mary Be Careful (1921)
