= On with the Dance (film) =

1920 film by George Fitzmaurice

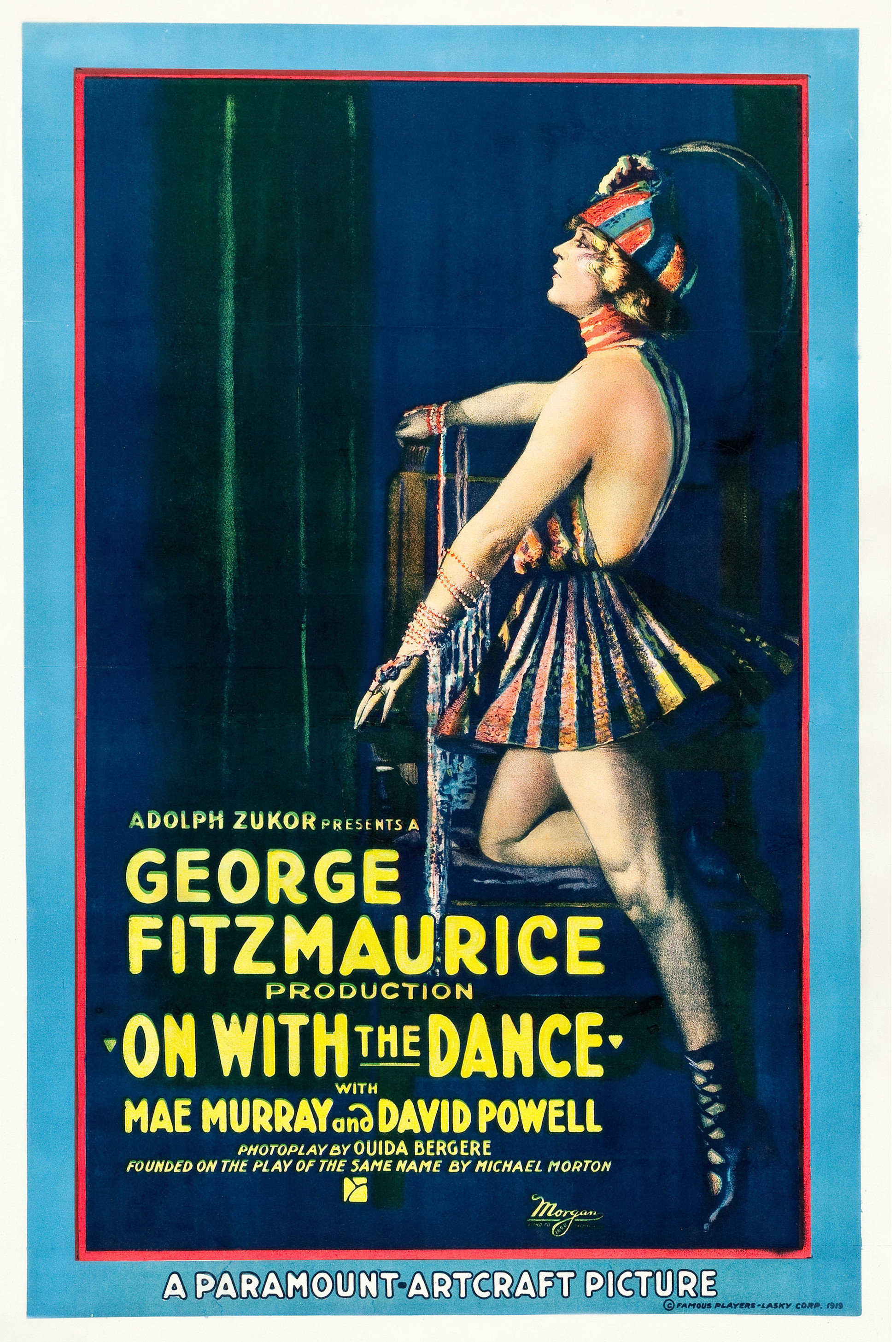
- Theatrical poster
- Directed by: George Fitzmaurice
- Screenplay by: Ouida Bergère
- Based on: On with the Dance by Michael Morton
- Produced by: Adolph Zukor
- Starring: Mae Murray; David Powell; Alma Tell; Holmes Herbert
- Narrated by: Adolph Zukor (presenter)
- Cinematography: Arthur C. Miller; Georges Benoît
- Production company: Famous Players–Lasky/Artcraft
- Distributed by: Paramount Pictures
- Release date: February 15, 1920
- Running time: 70 mins.
- Country: United States
- Languages: Silent film English intertitles

On with the Dance is 1920 American silent costume drama directed by George Fitzmaurice, starring Mae Murray and David Powell, and released by Paramount Pictures. Art direction for the film was done by Charles O. Seessel.

The film is a screen adaptation of the 1917 Michael Morton play by the same name. Actor Robert Schable had appeared in the 1917 Broadway play.

Filming began in August 1919 when Mae Murray rejoined Famous Players–Lasky Corporation after having completed a term with Universal Pictures.

== Cast ==
- Mae Murray as Sonia
- David Powell as Peter Derwynt
- Alma Tell as Lady Tremelyn
- John Miltern as Schuyler Van Vechten
- Robert Schable as Jimmy Sutherland
- Ida Waterman as Countess of Raystone
- Zolya Talma as Fay Desmond
- James A. Furey
- Peter Raymond

== Preservation ==
With no prints of On With The Dance located in any film archives, it is considered a lost film. In February of 2021, the film was cited by the National Film Preservation Board on their Lost U.S. Silent Feature Films list.

== Reception ==
The Evening Post wrote that Mae Murray's work with David Powell was a "revelation", and that her dance work in the film was one of its "outstanding features". Toronto Star noted the film as a success and wrote than fans of Mae Murray and David Powell will hail the two stars returning to headline George Fitzmaurice next film The Right to Love. The Milwaukee Journal wrote that the film played Mae Murray's "dainty little figure and delightful dancing" to advantage.

== In popular culture ==
An excerpt of the film is seen in the Paramount promotional film The House That Shadows Built (1931).
