= The Man Without a Heart =

1924 silent film

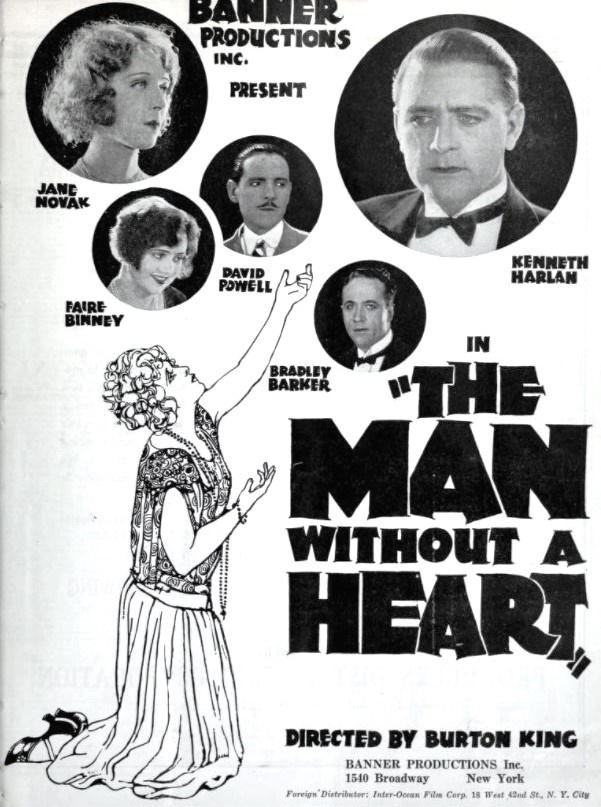
- Directed by: Burton L. King
- Written by: Ruby M. Ayres (novel); Harry Chandlee
- Starring: Kenneth Harlan; Jane Novak; David Powell
- Cinematography: Edward Paul
- Production company: Banner Productions
- Distributed by: Henry Ginsberg Distributing Company
- Release date: September 1924
- Running time: 60 minutes
- Country: United States
- Languages: Silent; English intertitles

The Man Without a Heart is a 1924 American silent drama film directed by Burton L. King and starring Kenneth Harlan, Jane Novak and David Powell.

== Cast ==
- Kenneth Harlan as Rufus Asher
- Jane Novak as Barbara Wier
- David Powell as Edmund Hyde
- Faire Binney as Linda Hyde
- Bradley Barker as Hugh Langley
- Tommy Tremaine as Margo Hume
- Mary McCall as Fanny Van Dyke
- Muriel Ruddell as Jane Wilkins
- Tom Blake as Pat O'Toole

== Bibliography ==
- Munden, Kenneth White. The American Film Institute Catalog of Motion Pictures Produced in the United States, Part 1. University of California Press, 1997.
