= Ouida Bergère =

American screenwriter and actress (1886–1974)

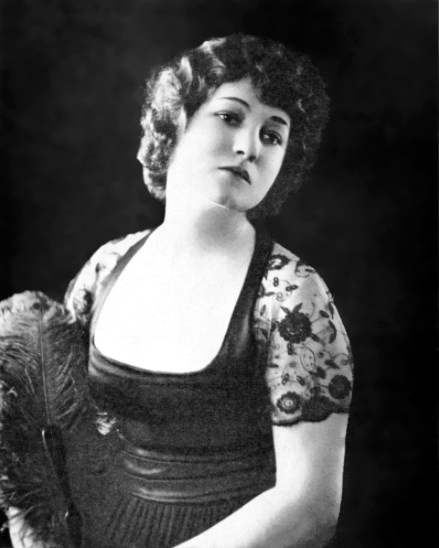
- Who's Who on the Silver Screen, 1920
- Born: Eunie Branch; December 14, 1886; Madrid, Spain
- Died: November 29, 1974 (aged 87); New York City, New York, U.S.
- Occupations: Actress, screenwriter
- Spouses: Louis Timothy Weadock (divorced); George Fitzmaurice (divorced); Basil Rathbone (1926–1967; his death); 1 child
- Children: Cynthia Rathbone

Ouida Bergère (born Eunie Branch; December 14, 1886 – November 29, 1974) was an American screenwriter and actress.

== Biography ==
Eunie Branch was born in Madrid, Spain, the daughter of Stephen W. and Ida Branch, both natives of Tennessee. Her early years were spent in Madrid, Paris and England. She came to the U.S. at eight years of age. Her father was a merchant who later worked as a railroad timekeeper. By the time of the taking of the 1900 Federal Census she was living with her brother's family in Searcy, Arkansas as Eunie Branch.

A decade later, she was listed in the census with her parents in Little Rock, Arkansas as Eula Burgess. Her marital status then was recorded as divorced and occupation, actress. In January of that year, she appeared as Ouida Bergère playing the stenographer in the play Via Wireless and was one of the few cast members to receive positive reviews in the production.

== Career ==
Bergère began her career as an actress. Playwright Winchell Smith gave her her first role, but she eventually abandoned her stage career and turned her attention to writing. She wrote for the New York Herald and for various magazines, and wrote the stories for silent film productions.

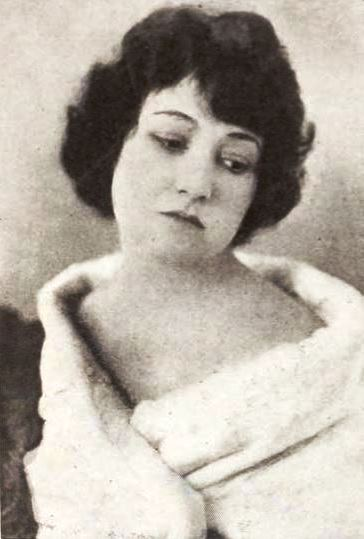
Bergère, 1920

She wrote most of the stories for the films of Elsie Ferguson, and many for Mae Murray, including On With the Dance. She also wrote for Pola Negri, Corinne Griffith, Bert Lytell, and Betty Compson, many of which were directed by her second husband George Fitzmaurice. In 1920, she wrote the screen version of Peter Ibbetson, starring Elsie Ferguson and Wallace Reid. During this time, she met Basil Rathbone, who was playing the lead role in the stage production of the play, and they eventually married in 1926.

In addition to the United States, Bergère worked on films in England, France and Italy. While in Rome, she wrote a screenplay titled The Eternal City (1923), based on the Hall Caine novel, directed by her husband George Fitzmaurice, and released by the Samuel Goldwyn Company. The film enlisted the assistance of the Fascists, and of Mussolini, with the help of the American ambassador in Rome. The film included a scene in which Mussolini appeared writing a letter and summoning a man to post it. 10,000 Blackshirts appeared in the Coliseum scenes for the film.

== Family ==
After her marriage to actor Basil Rathbone on April 18, 1926, Bergère gave up her film work to assist him in his work and in the management of his business affairs. Their first child died in infancy in 1928. They adopted a daughter named Cynthia Rathbone (1939–1969), and raised Ouida's niece, Ouida Branch, who married David Bruce Huxley, brother of Julian Huxley, Aldous Huxley, and Andrew Huxley.

== Death ==
Bergere died about two weeks shy of her 88th birthday at Roosevelt Hospital in New York from complications after falling and breaking her hip. She was survived by her younger sister Bernice C. Branch. She is buried next to Rathbone at Ferncliff Cemetery in New York.

== Filmography ==
=== Writer ===
Year	Films	Credit	Notes
1915	The Esterbrook Case		Short; Lost film
1915	Saints and Sinners		Short
1915	At Bay	Scenario	Lost film
1915	Via Wireless	Scenario	
1915	Wasted Lives		Short
1916	New York	Scenario	Lost film
1916	Virtue Triumphant		Lost film
1916	Big Jim Garrity	Scenario	
1916	Arms and the Woman	Scenario	Lost film
1916	The Romantic Journey	Scenario	Lost film
1917	Kick In	Scenario	
1917	The Iron Heart	Story	Lost film
1917	The On-the-Square Girl	Scenario	
1918	The Hillcrest Mystery	Scenario	Lost film
1918	Innocent	Scenario	Lost film
1918	More Trouble	Scenario	Lost film
1918	A Japanese Nightingale	Scenario	
1918	The Narrow Path	Scenario	Lost film
1919	Common Clay	Scenario	Lost film
1919	The Cry of the Weak	Story	Lost film
1919	The Profiteers	Scenario	Lost film
1919	The Avalanche	Scenario	Lost film
1919	Our Better Selves	Scenario	Lost film
1919	A Society Exile	Scenario	Lost film
1919	The Witness for the Defense	Scenario	
1919	Counterfeit	Scenario	Lost film
1919	The Broken Melody	Story	Lost film
1920	On With the Dance	Scenario	Lost film
1920	The Right to Love	Scenario	
1920	Idols of Clay	Story	
1921	Paying the Piper	Scenario	Lost film
1921	Peter Ibbetson	Scenario	Lost film
1922	Peacock Alley	Story	Lost film
1922	To Have and to Hold	Scenario	Lost film
1922	Three Live Ghosts	Scenario	
1922	The Man from Home	Scenario	
1923	Kick In	Adaptation	
1923	Bella Donna	Scenario	
1923	The Rustle of Silk	Scenario	Lost film
1923	The Cheat	Adaptation	Lost film
1923	Six Days	Adaptation	
1923	The Eternal City	Scenario	Lost film

=== Casting director ===
- At Bay (1915)

=== Actress ===
- Getting Even (1912)
- Mates and Mis-Mates (1912)
