= Love Comes Along =

1930 film

- Theatrical poster for German release of the film
- Directed by: Rupert Julian
- Written by: Wallace Smith (screenplay)
- Based on: Conchita by Edward Knoblock
- Produced by: William LeBaron; Henry Hobart
- Starring: Bebe Daniels; Lloyd Hughes; Montagu Love
- Cinematography: J. Roy Hunt
- Edited by: Archie Marshek
- Music by: Victor Baravalle (director); Sidney Clare (lyrics); Oscar Levant (music)
- Production company: RKO Radio Pictures
- Distributed by: RKO Radio Pictures
- Release date: January 5, 1930 (US)
- Running time: 72 minutes
- Country: United States
- Language: English
- Budget: $220,000
- Box office: $478,000

Love Comes Along is a 1930 American romantic film directed by Rupert Julian, written by Wallace Smith, based on the uncompleted play Conchita by Edward Knoblock. It was a vehicle specifically picked to highlight the vocal talents of Bebe Daniels, which also starred Lloyd Hughes and Montagu Love. It made a profit of $258,000.

== Plot ==
An actress, Peggy, is stranded on the island of Caparoja, which is ruled by a local dictator, Sangredo. For a living, she sings in the local tavern, where she is seen by two sailors from a tramp steamer who are visiting the port, Johnny and Happy. Johnny falls in love with Peggy and plans to marry her, rescuing her from her exile. However, Sangredo hires Peggy to perform at a party he is throwing, when the original singer, Carlotta, backs out. When Johnny finds out about the agreement, he misunderstands their relationship, and blows up at her. Peggy gets furious in turn over the fact he could believe that about her, and calls the wedding off.

At the party, Peggy relents, and sings a love song directly to Johnny, which angers Sangredo. He orders that Johnny be arrested, but Peggy steps forward to intercede on his behalf. She offers to spend the night with Sangredo, if he will release Johnny and let him sail with his steamer. He agrees, and Johnny is escorted to his ship. However, Johnny and Happy, sneak back to the town and break Peggy out of Sangredo's house. Fleeing, they board the steamer, escaping from the island.

== Cast ==
- Bebe Daniels as Peggy
- Lloyd Hughes as Johnny
- Montagu Love as Sangredo
- Ned Sparks as Happy
- Lionel Belmore as Brownie
- Alma Tell as Carlotta
- Evelyn Selbie as Bianca
- Sam Appel as Gómez

== Songs ==
- "Night Winds" - performed by Bebe Daniels
- "Until Love Comes Along" - performed by Bebe Daniels
- "I Am a Simple Maid" - performed by Bebe Daniels
- "A Sailor's Life" - Performed by Lloyd Hughes; reprised by Bebe Daniels and Lloyd Hughes

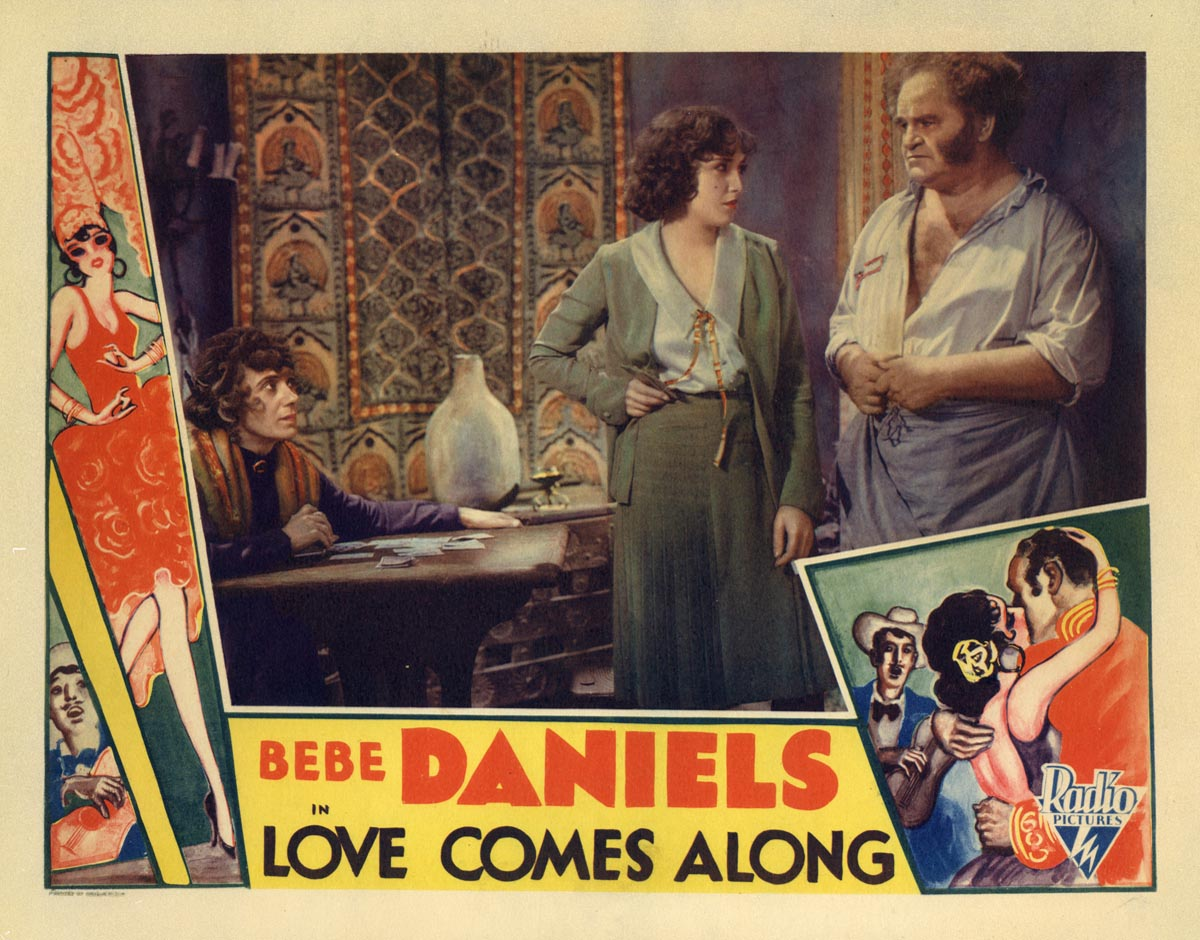
Lobby card for the film

== Reception ==
With a lower budget, audiences noted the drop in production quality in Love Comes Along when compared to Daniels' prior successful film Rio Rita (1929), but they did enjoy her songs.

== Preservation ==
An incomplete print of Love Comes Along has long been preserved in the Library of Congress collection.

== Notes ==
This film is based on the play Conchita by Edward Knoblock, which according to his papers, which are saved on the campus of Harvard University in the rare books collection in the Houghton Library, was never completed, with only an outline existing.

The film is also known by its Italian title, Ecco l'amore!
