= Appearances (film) =

1921 British film by Donald Crisp

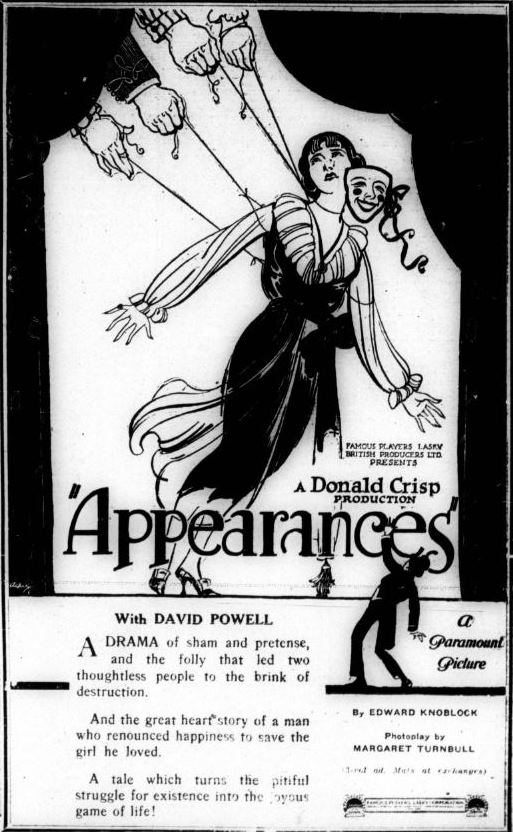
- American advertisement
- Directed by: Donald Crisp
- Written by: Edward Knoblock (story); Margaret Turnbull; Alfred Hitchcock (artwork titles)
- Starring: David Powell
- Cinematography: Hal Young
- Distributed by: Famous Players–Lasky British Producers
- Release date: 12 June 1921
- Running time: 53 minutes
- Country: United Kingdom
- Language: Silent (English intertitles)

Appearances is a 1921 British drama film directed by Donald Crisp. Alfred Hitchcock is credited as a title designer. It is a lost film.

== Cast ==
- David Powell as Herbert Seaton
- Mary Glynne as Kitty Mitchell
- Langhorn Burton as Sir William Rutherford
- Mary Dibley as Lady Rutherford
- Marjorie Hume as Agnes
- Percy Standing as Dawkins

== See also ==
- List of lost films
