= Maternity (film) =

1917 film directed by John B. O'Brien

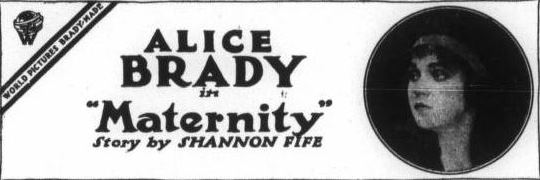
- Directed by: John B. O'Brien
- Written by: Shannon Fife
- Produced by: William A. Brady
- Starring: Alice Brady; Marie Chambers; John Bowers
- Cinematography: Harry B. Harris
- Production company: World Film
- Distributed by: World Film
- Release date: May 28, 1917
- Running time: 50 minutes
- Country: United States
- Languages: Silent; English intertitles

Maternity is a 1917 American silent drama film directed by John B. O'Brien and starring Alice Brady, Marie Chambers and John Bowers.

== Cast ==
- Alice Brady as Ellen Franklin
- Marie Chambers as Louise Randall
- John Bowers as David Gordon
- David Powell as John Locke
- Herbert Barrington as Henry Franklin
- Florence Crane as Marion Franklin
- Stanhope Wheatcroft as Dan Miller
- Charles Duncan as Joseph Randall
- Louis R. Grisel as Jed
- Julia Stuart as Amelia
- Madge Evans as Constance
- John Dudley as Family Doctor

== Production ==
During the scenes where the hospital is going up in flames, Alice Brady sustained minor injuries before escaping via trapdoor. It was shot at Fort Lee studios in New Jersey.

== Bibliography ==
- Langman, Larry. American Film Cycles: The Silent Era. Greenwood Publishing, 1998.
