= Idols of Clay =

1920 film

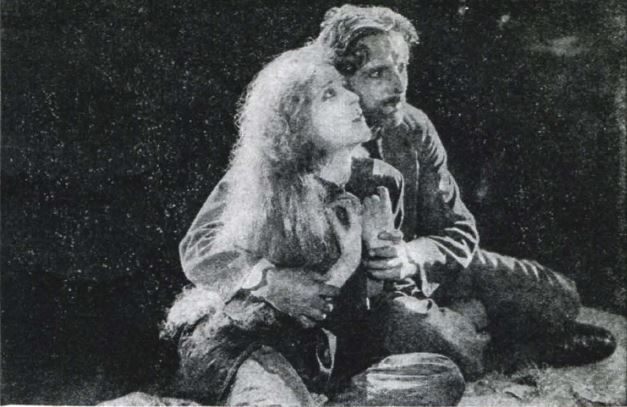
- Still from the film with Murray and Powell as printed in a 1921 issue of Photoplay
- Directed by: George Fitzmaurice
- Screenplay by: Ouida Bergère
- Story by: Ouida Bergère
- Produced by: Adolph Zukor
- Starring: Mae Murray; David Powell
- Cinematography: Arthur C. Miller
- Production company: Famous Players–Lasky
- Distributed by: Paramount Pictures
- Release date: November 28, 1920
- Running time: 70 minutes
- Country: United States
- Language: Silent (English intertitles)

Idols of Clay is a 1920 American silent drama film directed by George Fitzmaurice and starring Mae Murray and David Powell. Location shooting for the film was carried out in Miami, Florida doubling for the South Seas.

== Cast ==
- Mae Murray - Faith Merrill
- David Powell - Dion Holme
- Dorothy Cumming - Lady Cray
- George Fawcett - Jim Merrill
- Leslie King - Blinky
- Richard Wangermann - Old Master
- Claude King - Dr. Herbert

== Censorship ==
Idols of Clay was initially rejected in its entirety by the Kansas Board of Review, but upon appeal, was passed with extensive cuts.

== Preservation ==
A complete print of Idols of Clay is held by Gosfilmofond in Moscow.
