= James Crane (actor) =

American actor

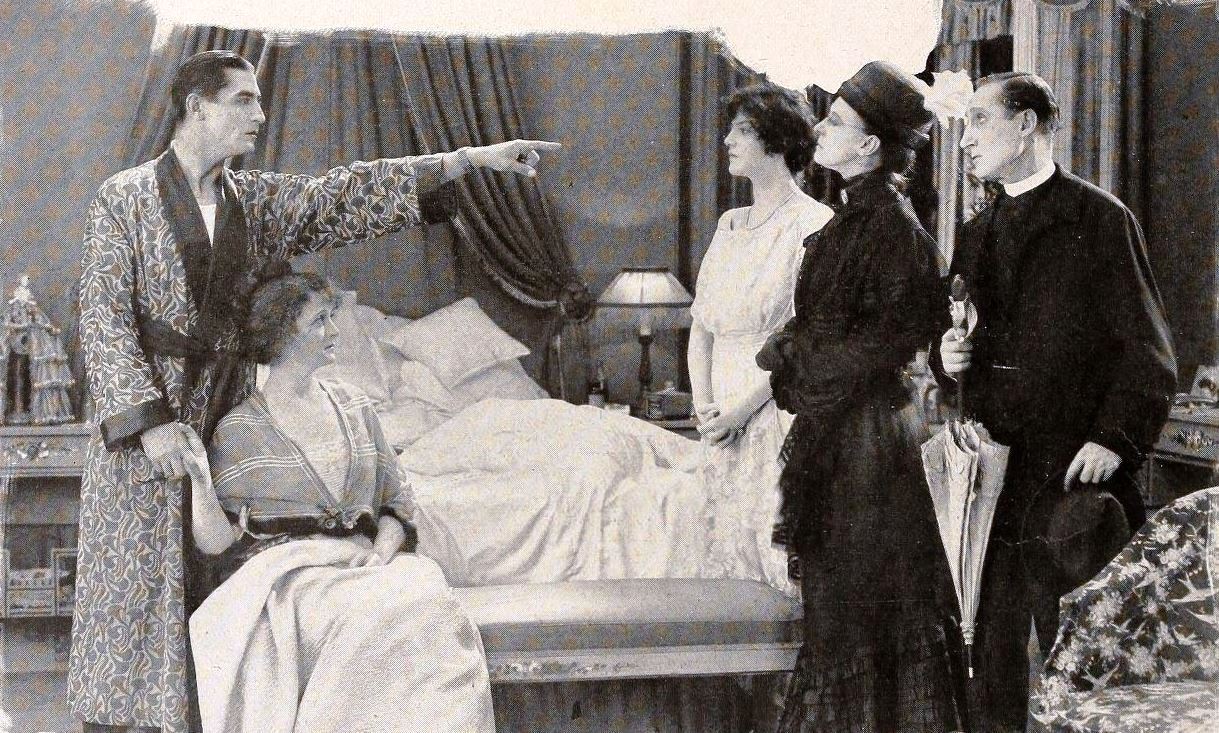
- Crane, pointing, with Billie Burke in The Misleading Widow 1919
- Born: James Lyon Crane; August 9, 1889; Rantoul, Illinois, U.S.
- Died: June 3, 1968 (aged 78); San Gabriel, California, U.S.
- Occupation: Actor
- Spouse: Alice Brady (m.1919–div.1922)
- Children: 1

James Lyon Crane (August 8, 1889 – June 3, 1968) was an American stage and screen actor.

== Early years ==
Crane was born in Rantoul, Illinois, and was the son of writer Frank Crane, who left the ministry and became an editorial writer for The New York Globe. He attended Bowdoin College and Williams College. During summer vacations, he began acting with stock companies in Worcester, Massachusetts.

== Career ==
Crane's New York debut came in The Price at the Hudson Theatre, after which he spent three years in stock theater, including having his own troupes in four cities. His Broadway credits included The Varying Shore (1921), Odd Man Out (1925), All Dressed Up (1925), Black Cockatoo (1926), Lost (1927), and Revelry (1927). In 1930, Crane signed with First National to make the film One Night at Susie's.

== Personal life ==
Crane was married to actress Alice Brady from 1919 to 1922. Together they had a son Donald Crane. He began in films in 1919 with one of his last films being the classic horror movie The Mummy (1932).

== Arrest ==
On April 27, 1927, Crane was arrested for having a handgun in his hotel room in New York City, a violation of the state's Sullivan Act. He said that the gun was one that he had used in theatrical productions. He was acquitted on June 17, 1927, after he reiterated the entertainment use of the weapon, saying that his valet had packed the pistol by mistake after a theatrical engagement ended. The patrolman who arrested him said the automatic pistol's magazine was missing.

== Filmography ==
- His Bridal Night (1919)
- The Misleading Widow (1919)
- Sadie Love (1919)
- Wanted: A Husband (1919)
- Sinners (1920)
- A Dark Lantern (1920)
- The Drake Case (1929)
- One Night at Susie's (1930)
- Dude Ranch (1931)
- Two Kinds of Women (1932)
- Lady and Gent (1932)
- The Mummy (1932)
- Good Dame (1934)*uncredited
- The Amazing Mr. Williams (1939)*uncredited
