= A Dark Lantern =

1920 film by John S. Robertson

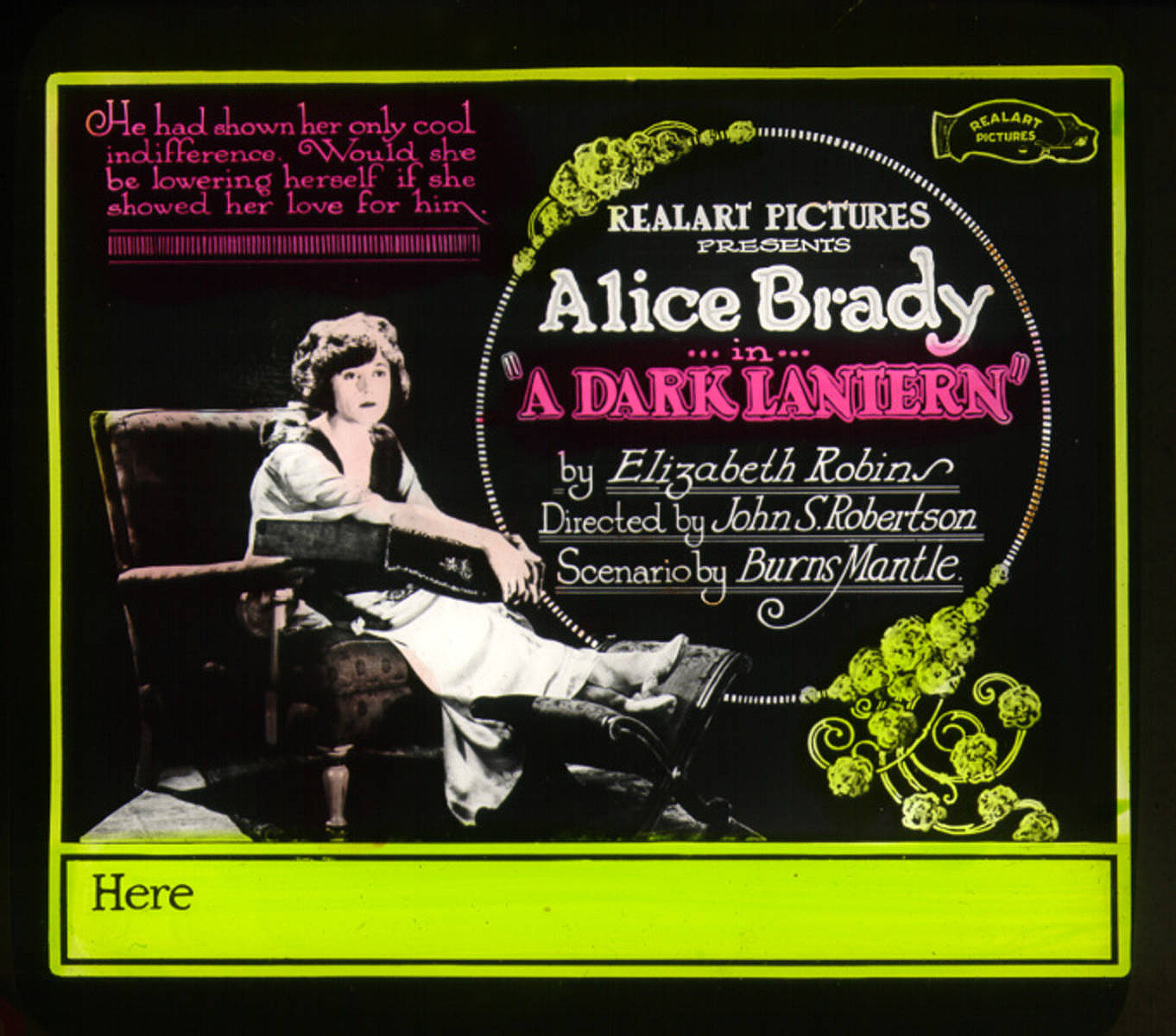
- Lantern slide
- Directed by: John S. Robertson
- Written by: Burns Mantle (scenario)
- Based on: A Dark Lantern by Elizabeth Robins
- Starring: Alice Brady; James L. Crane
- Cinematography: Roy Overbaugh
- Production company: Realart Pictures Corporation
- Distributed by: Realart Pictures Corporation
- Release date: July 16, 1920
- Running time: 6 reels (5,956 feet)
- Country: United States
- Language: Silent (English intertitles)

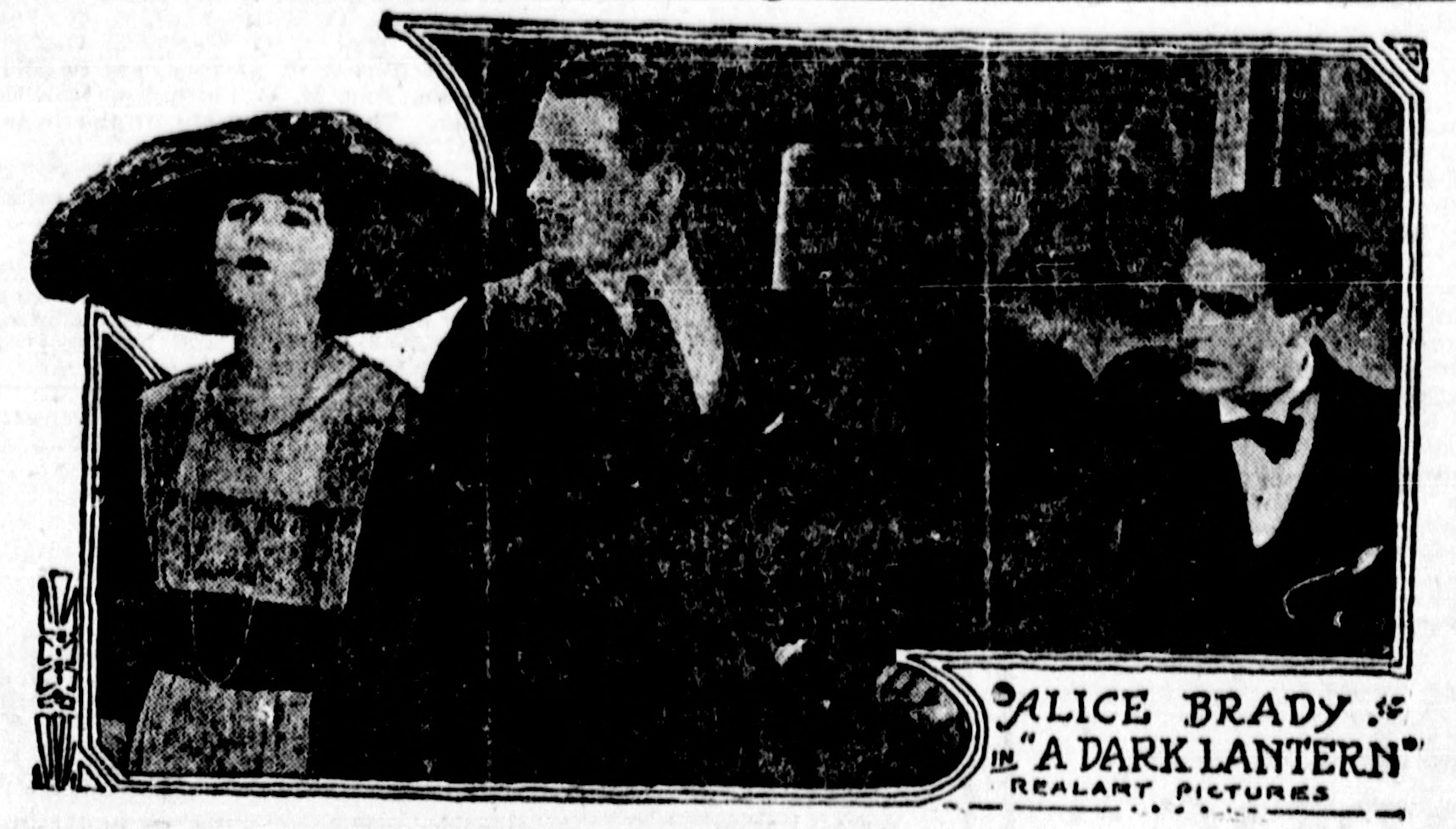
Publicity photo from a contemporary newspaper.

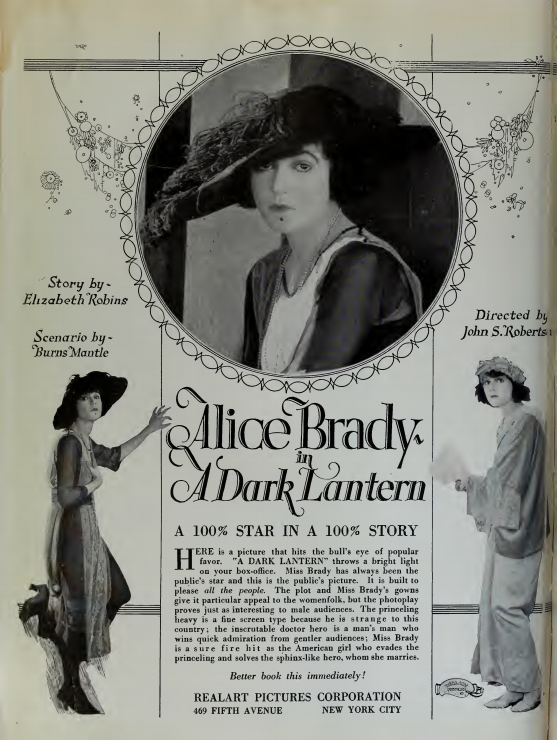
Ad in The Film Daily, 1920

A Dark Lantern is a 1920 American silent drama film produced and released by Realart Pictures. It is based on a 1905 novel of the same name by Elizabeth Robins. John S. Robertson directed and Alice Brady and her then husband James Crane star.

== Plot ==
As described in a film magazine, mistaking the intentions of Prince Anton of Argovinia in seeking her hand, young English woman Katherine Dereham suffers a great shock when his attentions culminate in a proposal that she be his morganatic wife, his country requiring an alliance with a royal princess. This, together with the blow of her father's death, shatters Katherine's nerves and causes a breakdown. She recovers under the rigid administrations of Dr. Garth Vincent. Her attitude of antagonistic exaggeration of his sternness that conceives it as sheer brutality makes her submission to the deep love he bears her a sorrowful task. His patience at last breaks her embittered spirit and sends her to his home, willing to accept his protection under compromising circumstances. The realness of his affection is at last revealed to her and Prince Anton, whose love for Katherine has made him risk his throne by divorcing his wife, is sent back to Argovinia.

== Cast ==
- Alice Brady as Katherine Dereham
- James Crane as Dr. Garth Vincent
- Reginald Denny as Prince Anton
- Brandon Hurst as Colonel Dereham
- Marie Burke as Lady Peterborough
- David Monterno as Graf-Wilhelm
- Carolyn Irwin as Mrs. Hally
- Mrs. Tony West as Mrs. Todine
- Roni Pursell as Princess Margaretha
- Russell McDermott as Leonard
- Virginia Huppert as Nurse for Katherine
- Dorothy Betts as Natalie, Maid

== Production ==
According to the AFI Catalog, the film was shot at the Essanay studios in Chicago as that was where Alice Brady was appearing in a play at the time.

== Preservation ==
With no prints of A Dark Lantern located in any film archives, it is a lost film.
