= Alice Brady =

American actress (1892–1939)

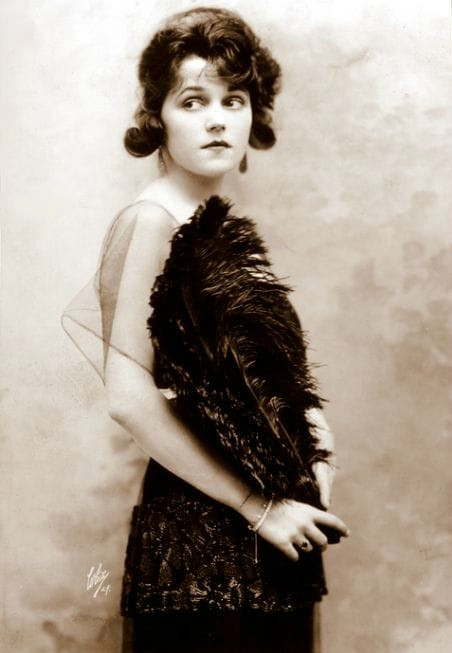
- Brady c. 1916
- Born: Mary Rose Brady; November 2, 1892; New York City, U.S.
- Died: October 28, 1939 (aged 46); New York City, U.S.
- Occupation: Actress
- Years active: 1914–1939
- Spouse: James L. Crane (m.1919–div.1922)
- Children: 1
- Father: William A. Brady

Signature
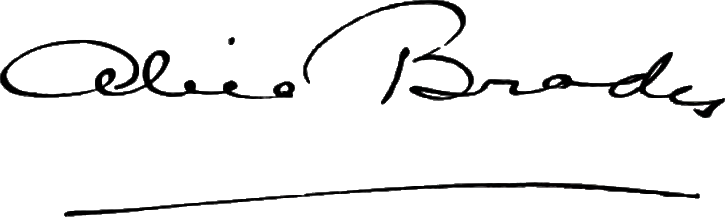

Alice Brady (born Mary Rose Brady; November 2, 1892 – October 28, 1939) was an American actress of stage and film. She began her career in the theatre in 1911, and her first important success came on Broadway in 1912 when she created the role of Meg March in the original production of Marian de Forest's Little Women. As a screen actress she first appeared in silent films and was one of the few actresses to survive the transition into talkies. She worked until six months before her death from cancer in 1939. Her films include My Man Godfrey (1936), in which she plays the flighty mother of Carole Lombard's character, and In Old Chicago (1938), for which she won the Academy Award for Best Supporting Actress.

In 1960, Brady received a motion pictures star on the Hollywood Walk of Fame for her contributions to the film industry. Her star is located at 6201 Hollywood Boulevard.

== Early life ==
Mary Rose Brady was born in New York City. Her father, William A. Brady, was of Irish descent and an important theatrical producer. Her mother, French actress Rose Marie René, died in 1896, when Alice Brady was 3 years old. Alice was interested at an early age in becoming an actress. She first went on the stage when she was 14 and got her first job on Broadway in 1911 at the age of 18, in a show with which her father was associated.

== Career ==
Billed as Mary Rose, Brady debuted on stage in 1911 in New Haven in the operetta The Balkan Princess. She had the first major success of her career in 1912 when she created the role of Meg March in the original Broadway and national touring productions of Marian de Forest's Little Women; a play adapted from the novel by Louisa May Alcott.

In 1913, Brady appeared with John Barrymore in A Thief for a Night (adapted by P. G. Wodehouse and playwright John Stapleton from Wodehouse's novel, A Gentleman of Leisure) at McVicker's Theatre in Chicago. She continued to perform on Broadway consistently (often in shows her father produced) for the next 22 years. In 1931 she appeared in the premiere of Eugene O'Neill's Mourning Becomes Electra. Her step-mother was actress Grace George, whom her father married when Alice was a child. Her half-brother was William A. Brady Jr, the son of her father and Grace George.

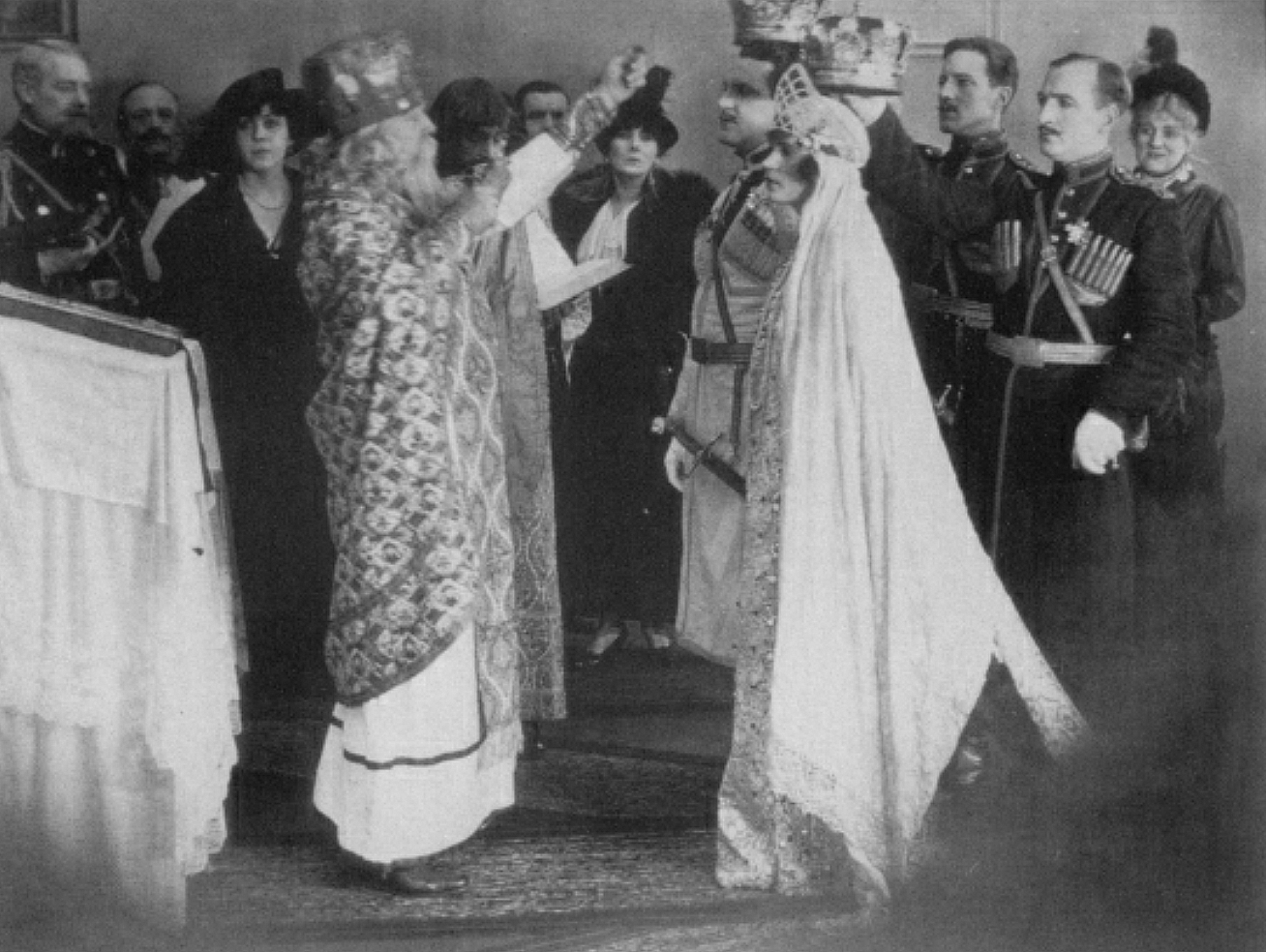
Brady with co-star John Bowers in the 1917 World Film Company's film Darkest Russia

Brady's father moved into movie production and presentation in 1913, with his World Film Company, and Brady soon followed along after him, making her first silent feature appearance in As Ye Sow in 1914. She appeared in 53 films in the next 10 years, all while continuing to perform on stage, the film industry at the time being centered in New York.

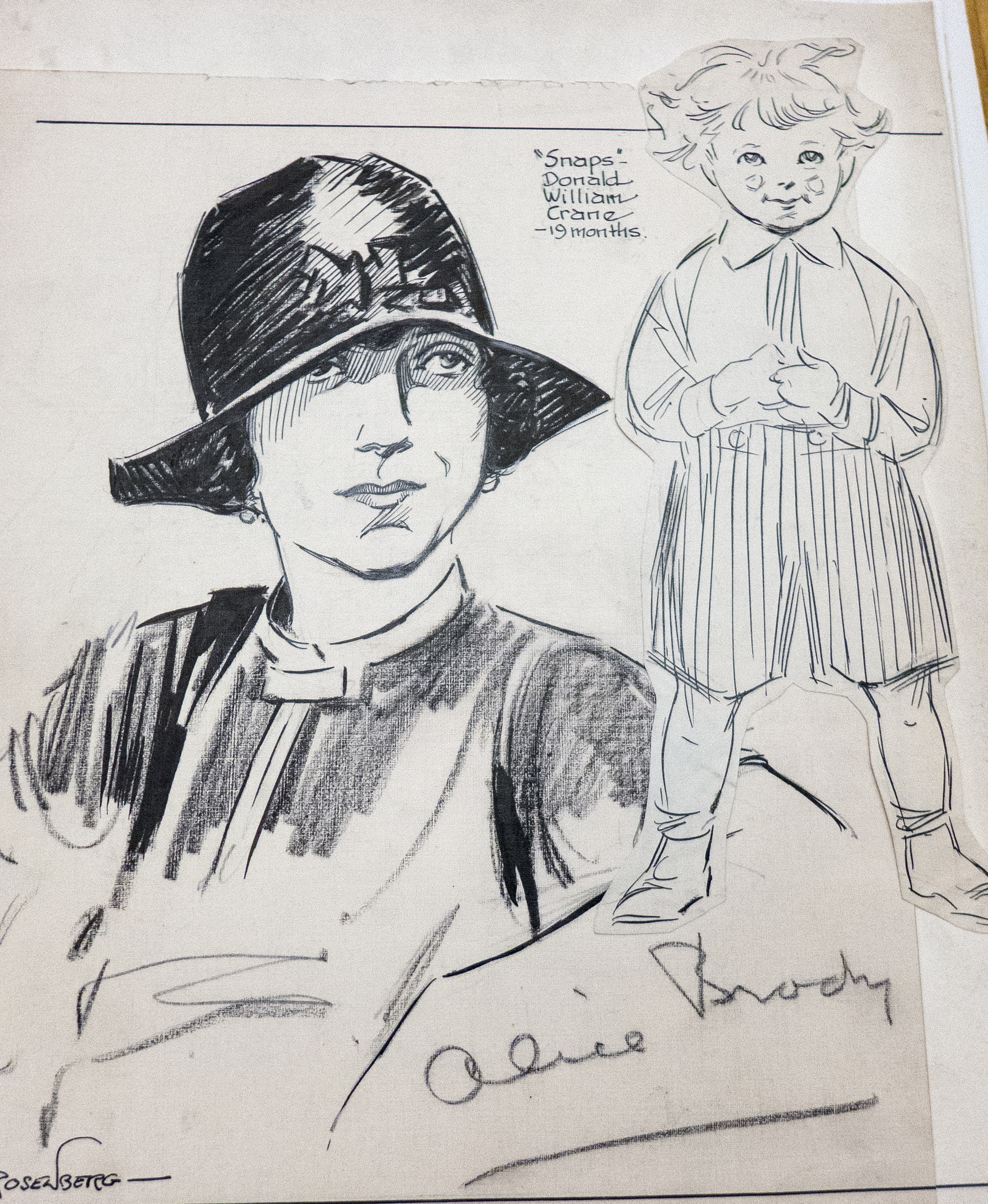
Alice Brady and son, autographed drawing by Manuel Rosenberg for the Cincinnati Post, 1920

In 1923, she stopped appearing in films to concentrate on stage acting, and did not appear on the screen again until 1933, when she made the move to Hollywood and MGM's When Ladies Meet become her first talking picture. From then on she worked frequently until her death, making another 25 films in seven years. Her final film was Young Mr. Lincoln (1939).

== Personal life and death ==
Brady was married to actor James Crane from 1919 to 1922, when they divorced. They co-starred in three silent films together: His Bridal Night (1919), Sinners (1920), and A Dark Lantern (1920). The couple had one child, Donald.

Brady died from cancer on October 28, 1939, five days before her 47th birthday. She is buried in Sleepy Hollow Cemetery in New York.

== Awards ==
For her portrayal of Mrs. Molly O'Leary – a fictionalized version of Catherine O'Leary – in 1937's In Old Chicago, Brady won the Academy Award for Best Supporting Actress. She had been nominated for the same award the year before as well, for her work in My Man Godfrey.

A long-enduring myth states that at the Academy Awards presentation dinner, Brady's Oscar Award, a plaque (statuettes were not awarded for the Supporting categories until 1943) was stolen by a man who came onstage to accept the award on the absent actress's behalf and that it was never recovered, and the impostor was never tracked down. The Academy then issued a replacement plaque which was later presented to Brady.

However, according to press at the time the film's director, Henry King, accepted on her behalf at the ceremony and friends of Ms. Brady delivered it to her home later that night. Winners were given blank awards at the ceremony and returned them to the Academy to have them engraved afterward. In 2016, the Oscar historian Olivia Rutigliano noted that Miss Brady also followed this practice, which may have led to the story that the Academy was presenting her with a replacement trophy.

== Filmography ==
A sample of her more than 80 films includes:

Silent

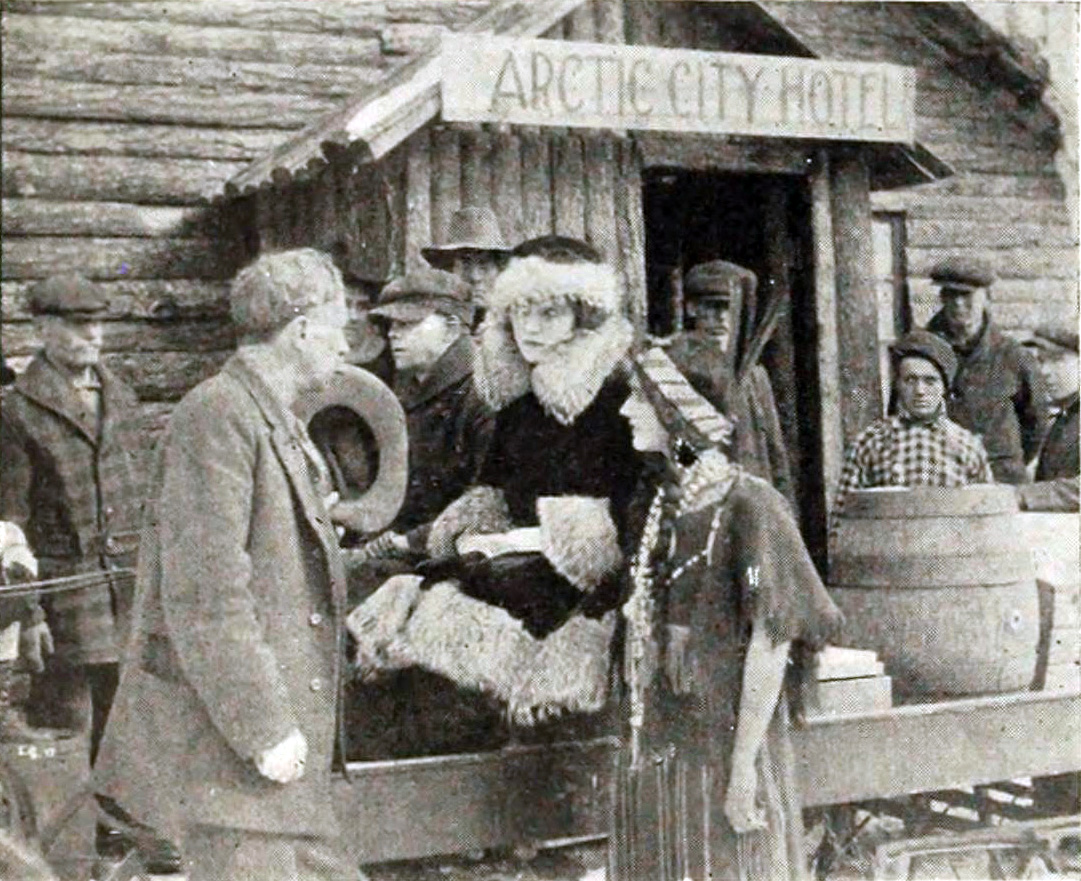
Tangled Fates (1916)

- The Boss (1915 World Film) Lost
- A Cup of Chance (1915 General Film)
- The Lure of Woman (1915 World) (incomplete; Library of Congress)
- The Rack (1915 World) Lost
- The Ballet Girl (1916 World) Lost
- The Woman in 47 (1916 World) (extant; BFI National Film & TV, London)
- Then I'll Come Back to You (1916 World) Lost
- Tangled Fates (1916 World) Lost
- La vie de Bohème (1916 World) (extant; Geo. Eastman House)
- Miss Petticoats (1916 World) (extant; Geo. Eastman House)
- The Gilded Cage (1916 World) (*extant; Library of Congress, Geo. Eastman, BFI, London)
- Bought and Paid For (1916 World) Lost
- A Woman Alone (1917) Lost
- A Hungry Heart (1917) Lost
- The Dancer's Peril (1917) (*extant; DVD Grapevine video, Geo. Eastman, Cineteca Del Friuli)
- Darkest Russia (1917) (incomplete; Library of Congress)
- Maternity (1917) Lost
- The Divorce Game (1917) Lost
- A Self-Made Widow (1917) Lost
- Betsy Ross (1917) (*extant; online, Grapevine DVD)
- A Maid of Belgium (1917)
- Her Silent Sacrifice (1917) (*extant; Library of Congress)
- Woman and Wife (1918)
- The Knife (1918)
- The Spurs of Sybil (1918)
- The Trap (1918 World)
- At the Mercy of Men (1918 Select)
- The Ordeal of Rosetta (1918 Select)
- The Whirlpool (1918 Select)
- The Death Dance (1918 Select)
- The Better Half (1918 Select)
- Her Great Chance (1918 Select)
- In the Hollow of Her Hand (1918 Select)
- The Indestructible Wife (1919 Select)
- The End of the Road (1919 Public Health Films)
- The World to Live In (1919 Select)
- Marie, Ltd. (1919 Select)
- Redhead (1919 Select) Lost
- His Bridal Night (1919 Select)
- The Fear Market (1920 Realart) Lost
- Sinners (1920 Realart) Lost
- A Dark Lantern (1920 Realart) Lost
- The New York Idea (1920 Realart) (*extant; George Eastman House)
- Out of the Chorus (1921 Realart) Lost
- The Land of Hope (1921 Realart) Lost
- Little Italy (1921 Realart) Lost
- Dawn of the East (1921 Paramount-Realart) Lost
- Hush Money (1921 Paramount) Lost
- A Trip to Paramountown (1922) (*short)
- Missing Millions (1922 Paramount) Lost
- Anna Ascends (1922 Paramount) (*6 min. fragment)
- The Leopardess (1923 Paramount) Lost
- The Snow Bride (1923 Paramount) Lost

Sound

- When Ladies Meet (1933 MGM)
- Beauty for Sale (1933 MGM)
- Stage Mother (1933 MGM)
- Broadway to Hollywood (1933 MGM)
- The Gay Divorcee (1934 RKO)
- Miss Fane's Baby Is Stolen (1934 Paramount)
- Gold Diggers of 1935 (1935 Warner Brothers)
- Let 'Em Have It (1935 United Artists)
- Three Smart Girls (1936 Universal)
- Go West, Young Man (1936 Paramount)
- My Man Godfrey (1936 Universal)
- The Harvester (1936 Republic Pictures)
- Call It a Day (1937 Warner Brothers)
- One Hundred Men and a Girl (1937 Universal)
- Mr. Dodd Takes the Air (1937 Warner Brothers)
- In Old Chicago (1938 20th Century-Fox)
- Goodbye Broadway (1938 Universal)
- Joy of Living (1938 RKO)
- Zenobia (1939 United Artists)
- Young Mr. Lincoln (1939 20th Century-Fox)

== Gallery ==
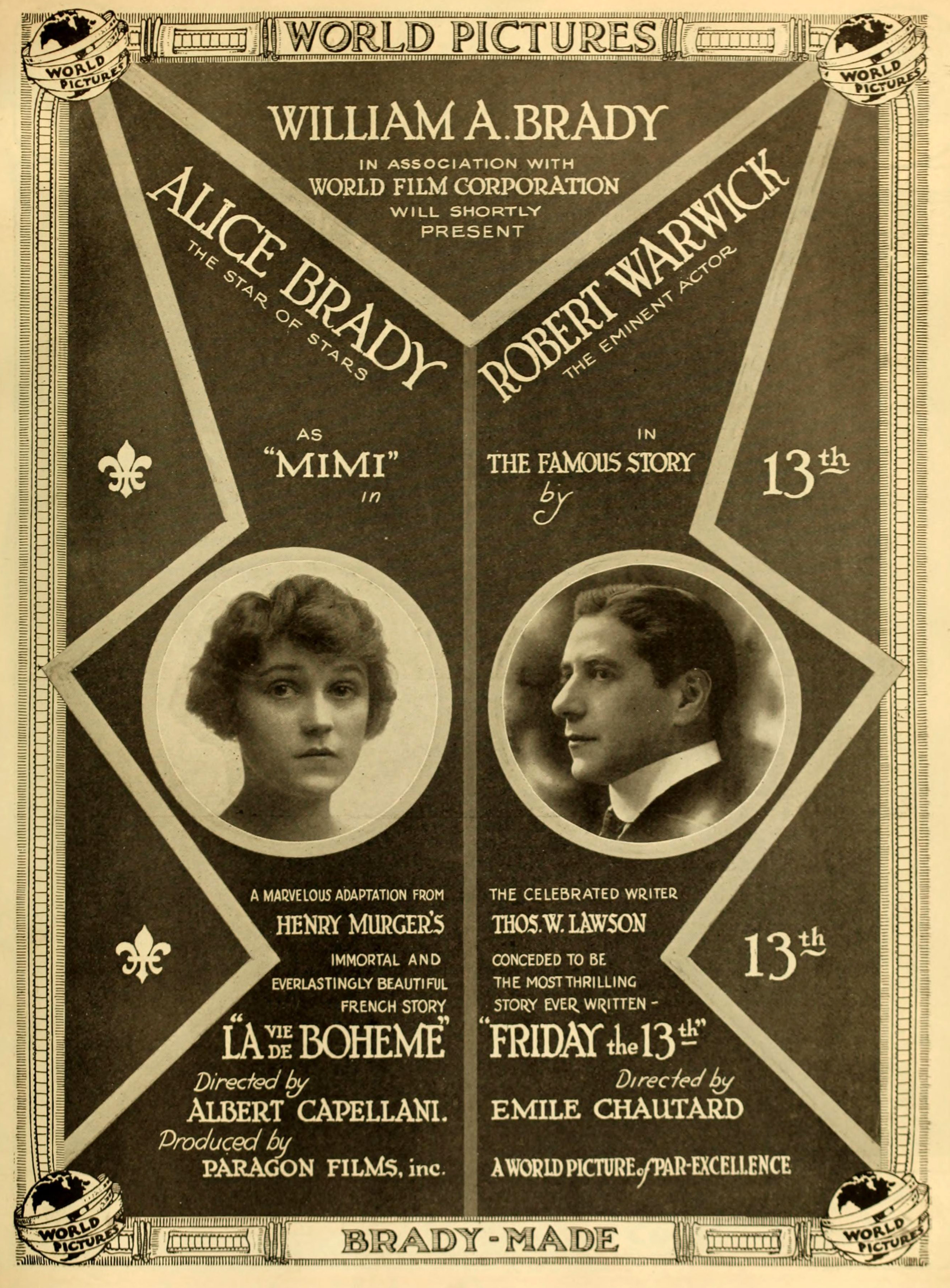
La Bohème – 1916

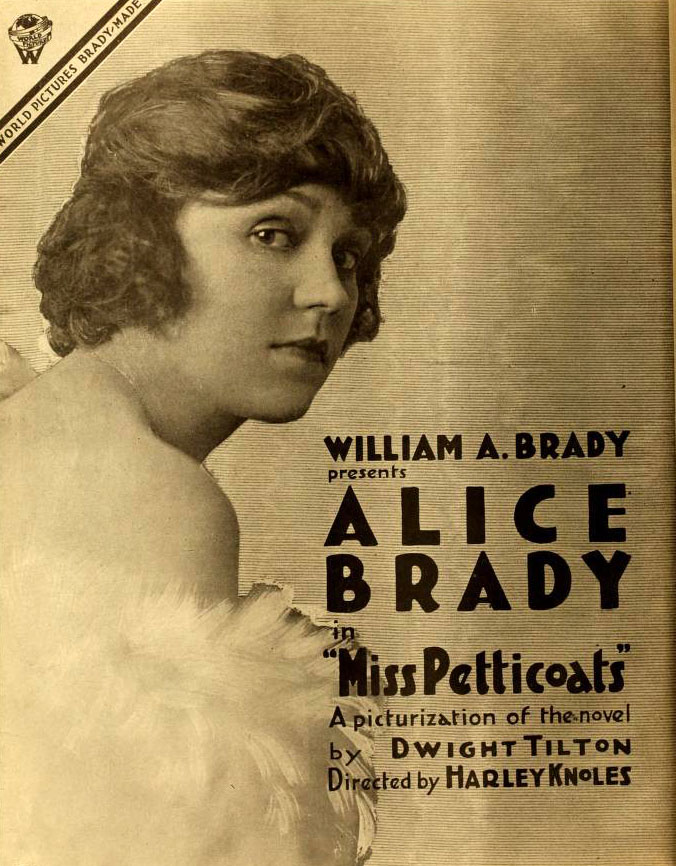
Miss Petticoats – 1916

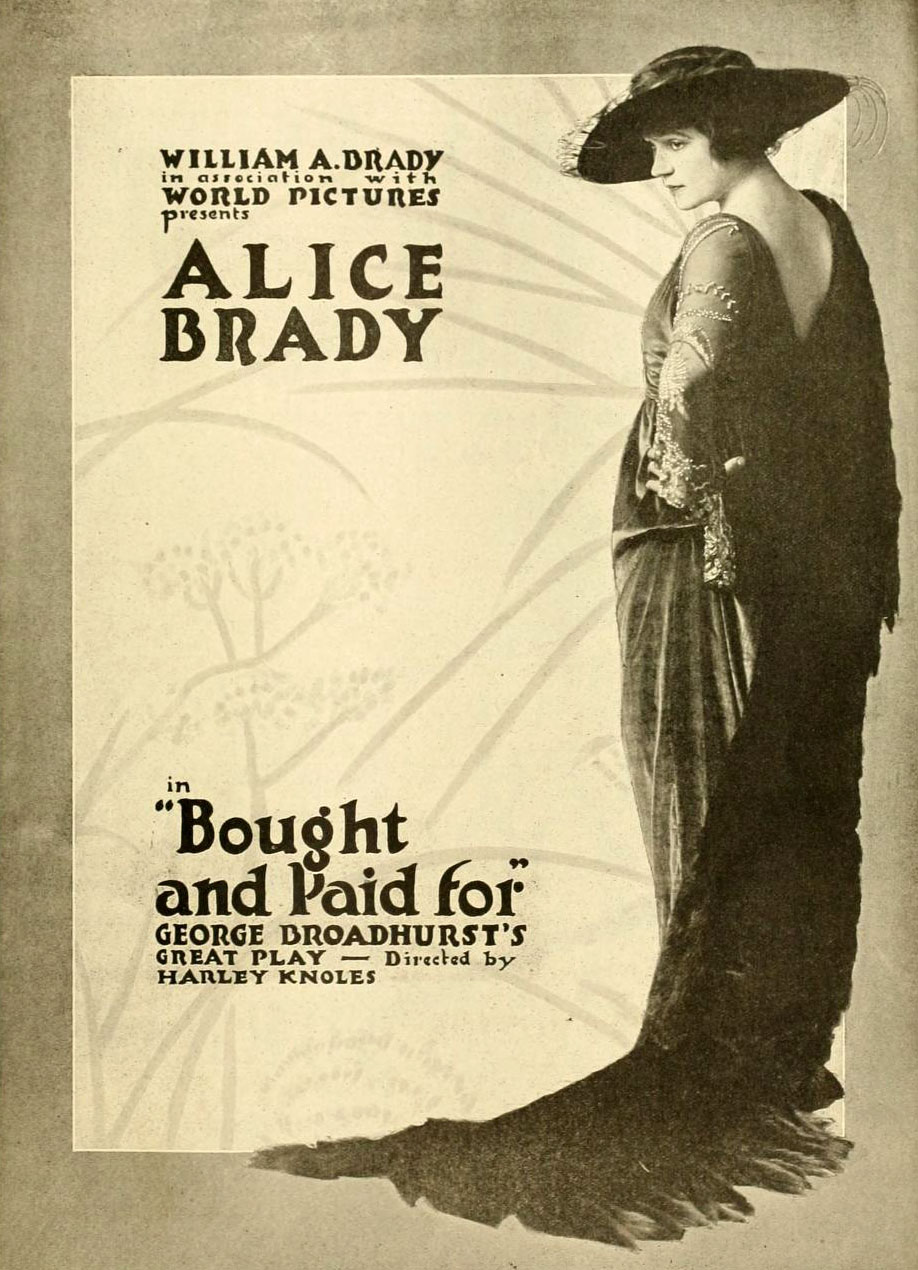
Bought and Paid For – 1916

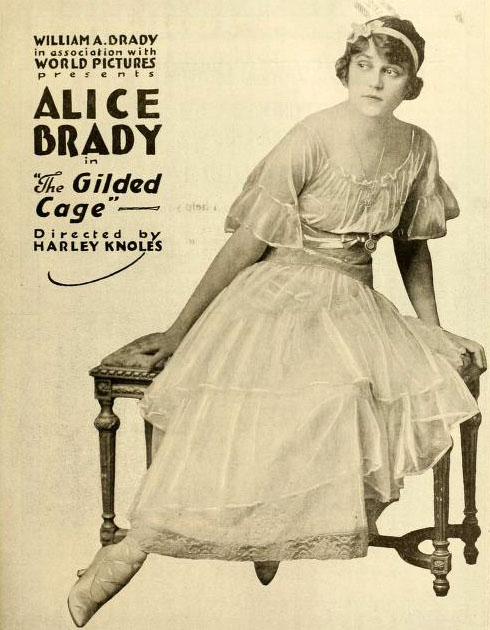
The Gilded Cage – 1916

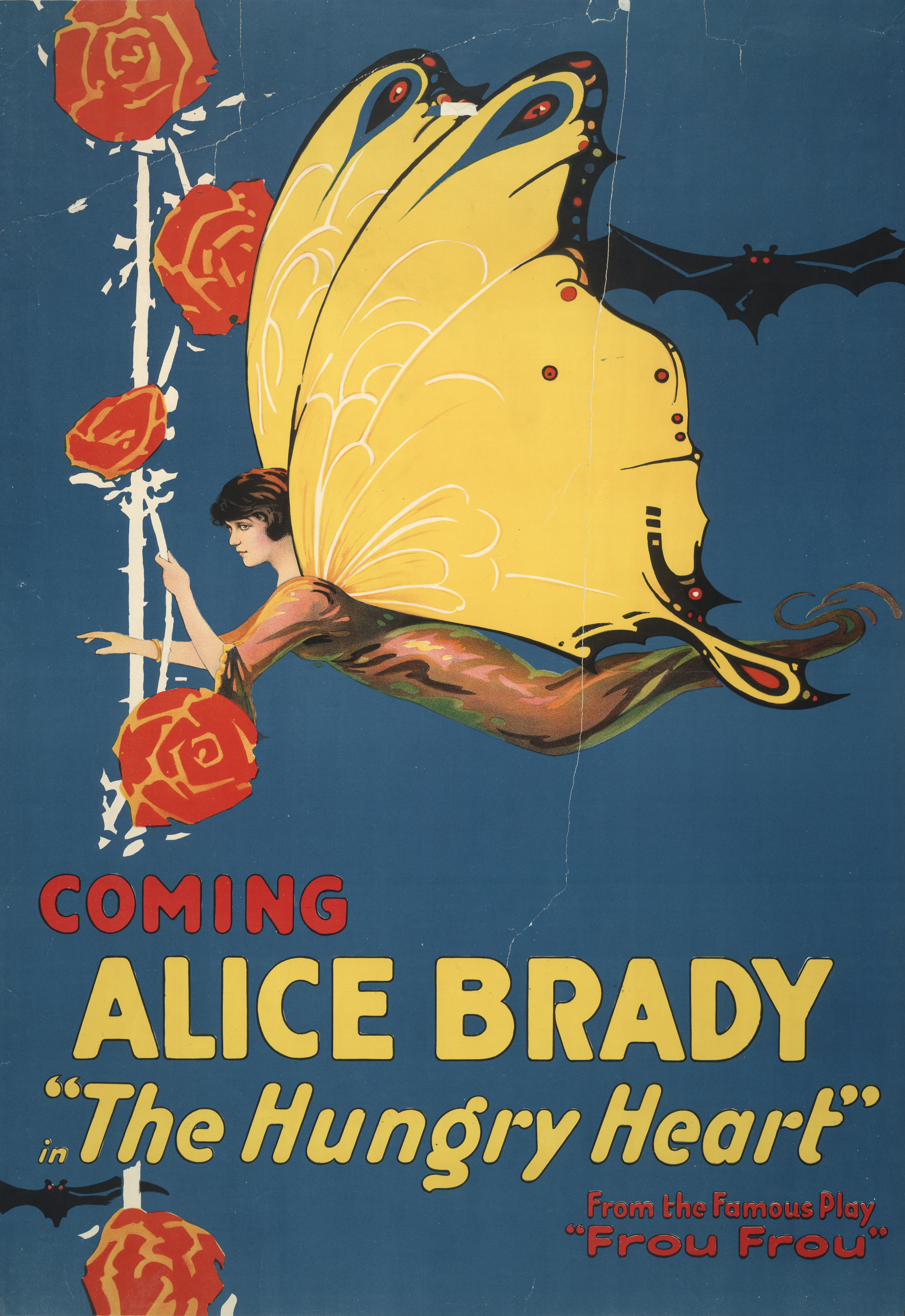
Poster of the silent movie The Hungry Heart – 1917

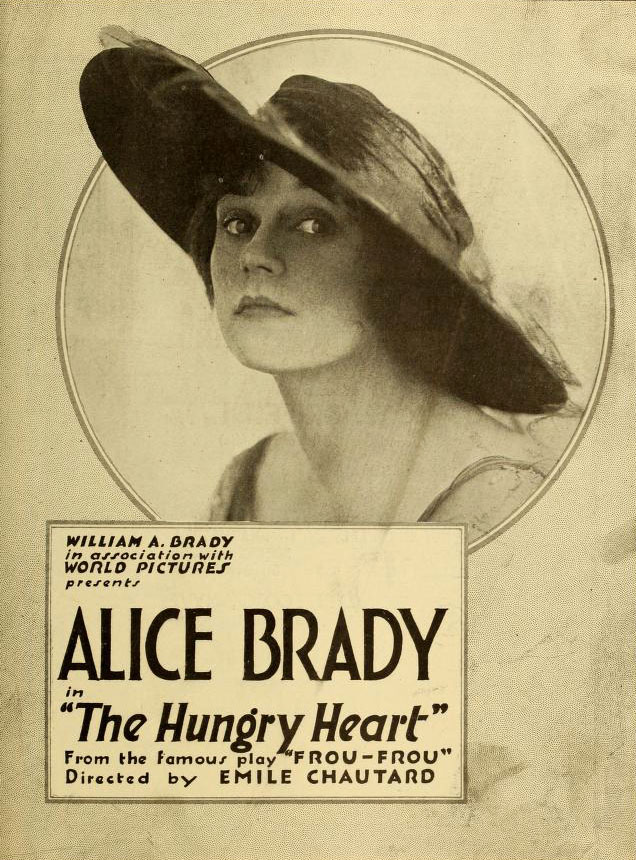
The Hungry Heart – 1917

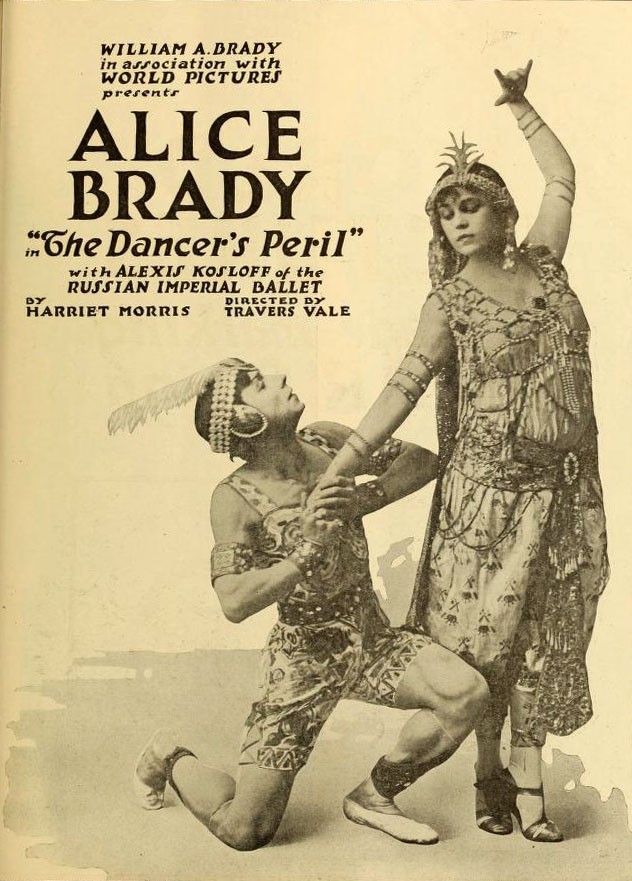
The Dancer's Peril – 1917

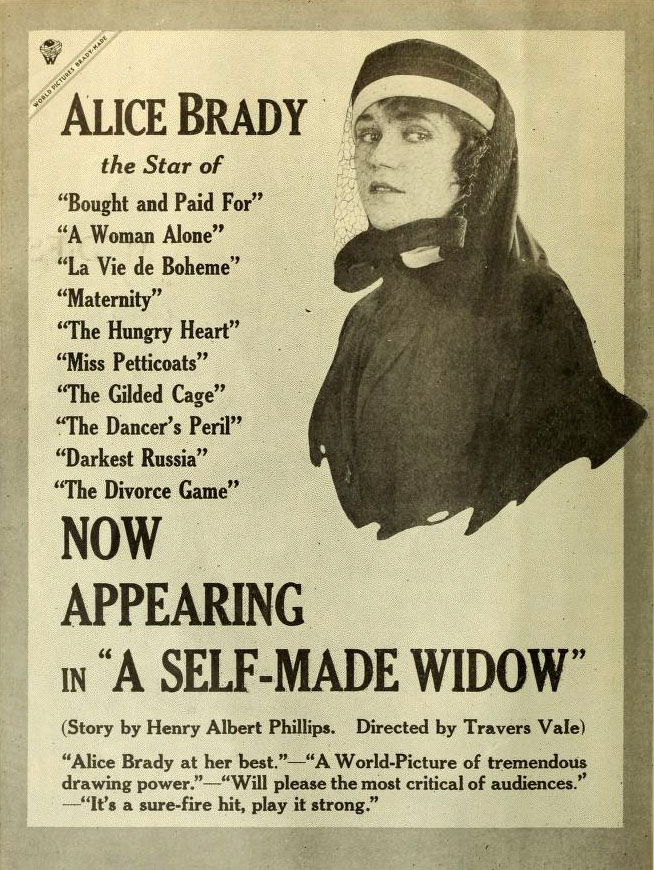
A Self-Made Widow – 1917

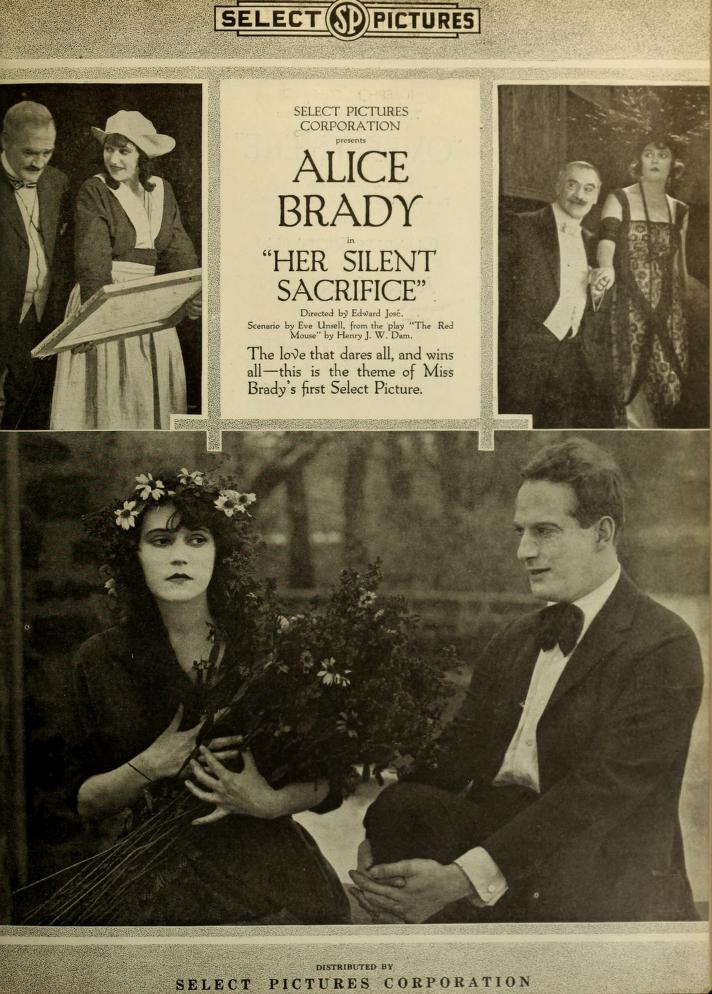
Her Silent Sacrifice – 1917

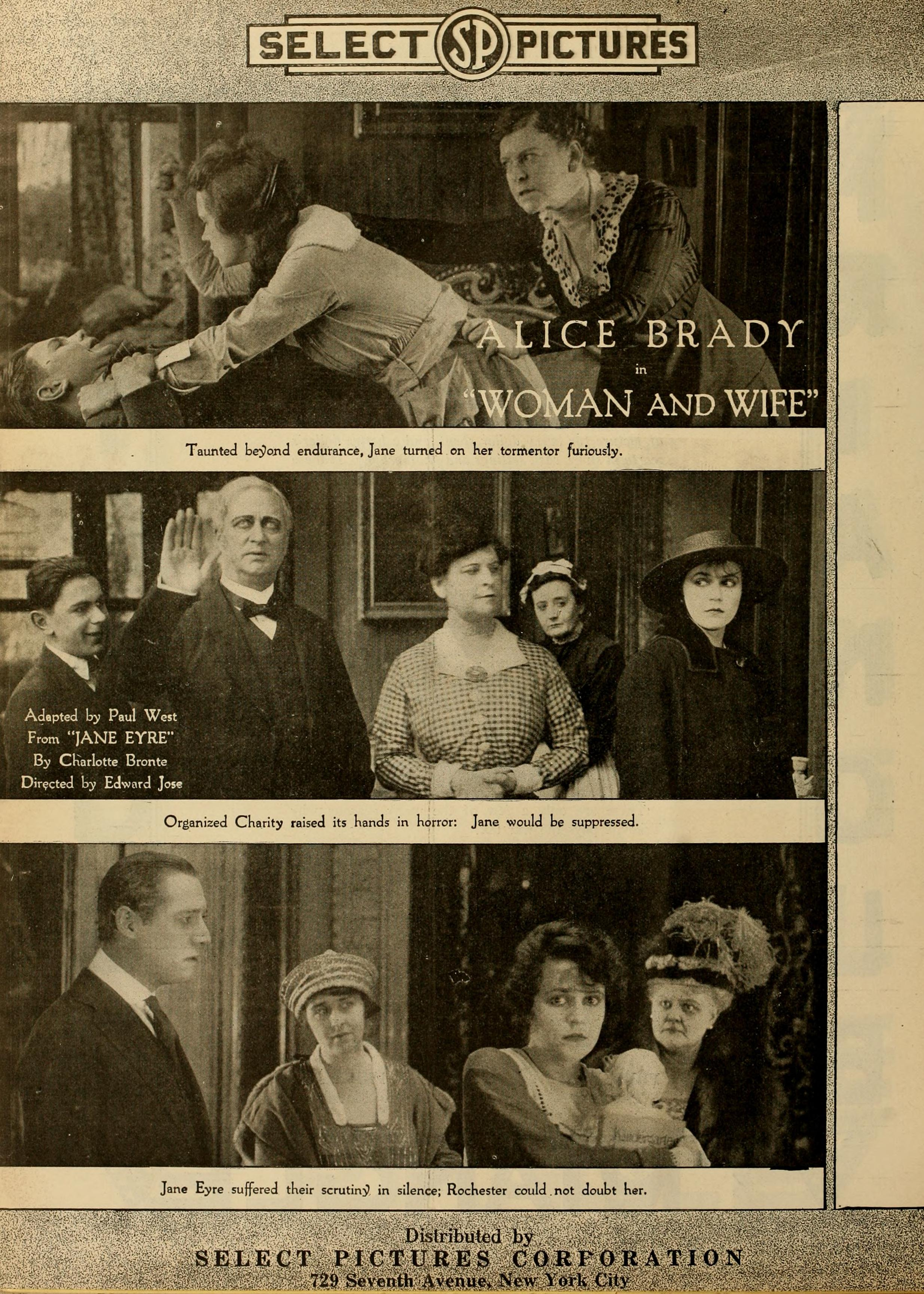
Woman and Wife – 1918

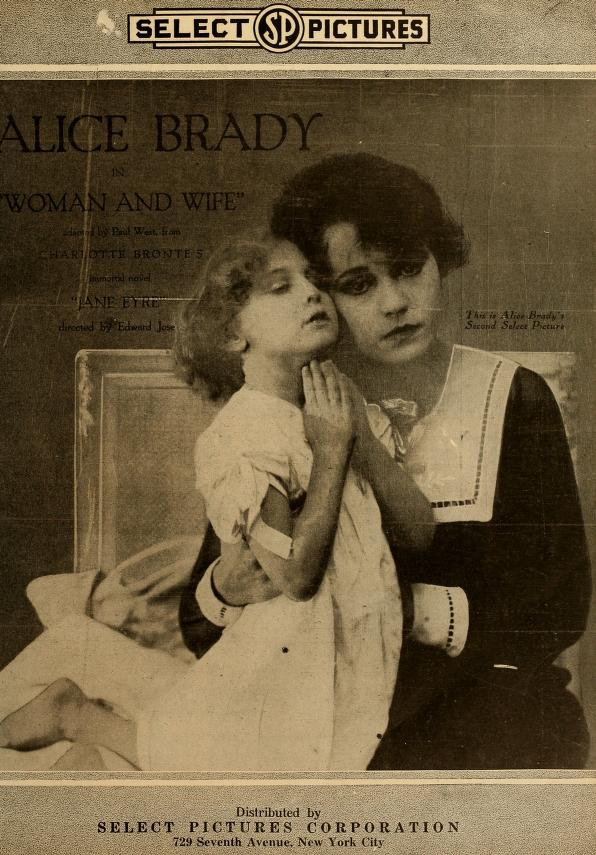
Woman and Wife – 1918

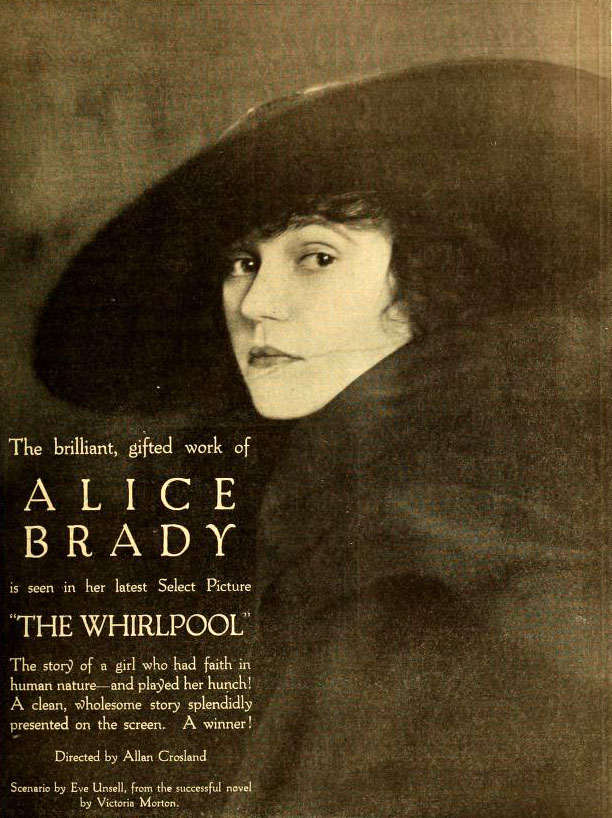
The Whirlpool – 1919

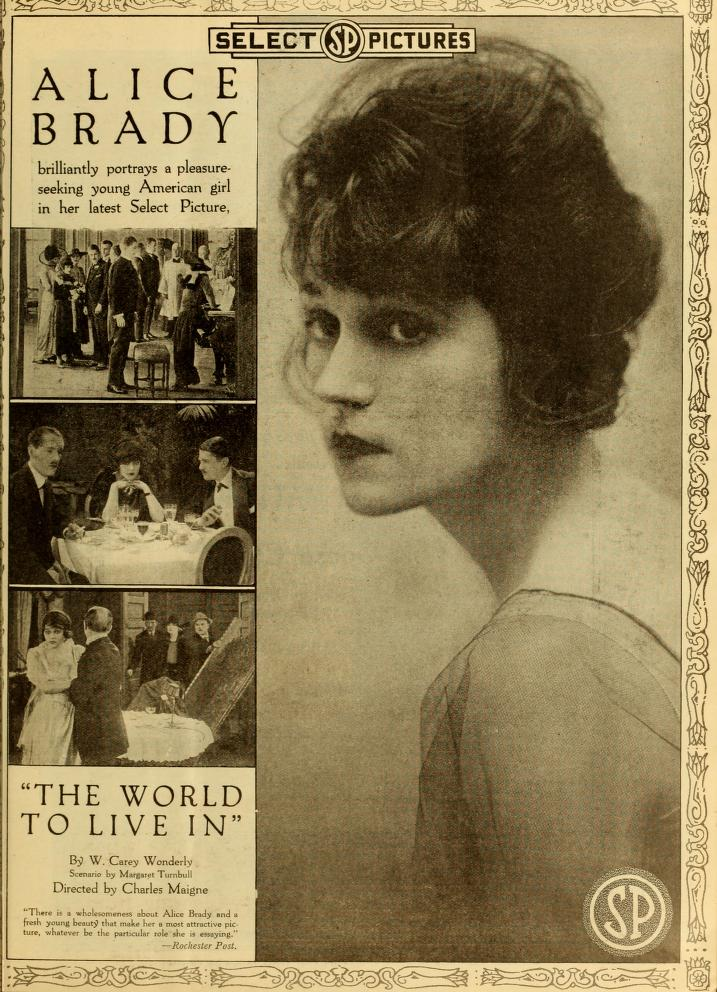
The World To Live In – 1919

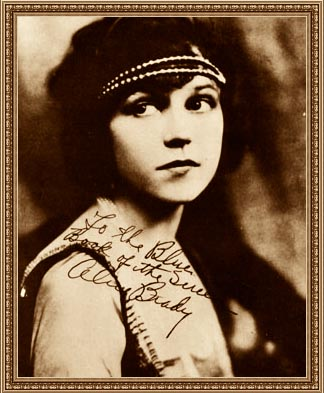
Alice Brady in The Blue Book of the Screen – 1923

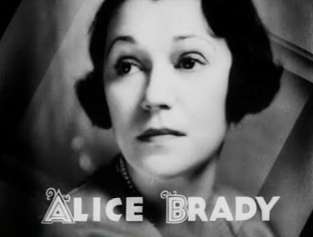
Alice Brady in Broadway to Hollywood – 1933

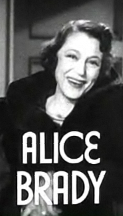
Alice Brady in Mama Steps Out – 1937

== See also ==
- List of actors with Academy Award nominations
