= The Siren Call =

1922 film by Irvin Willat

- Theatrical release poster
- Directed by: Irvin Willat
- Screenplay by: Philip D. Hurn; Victor Irvin; J.E. Nash
- Produced by: Adolph Zukor
- Starring: Dorothy Dalton; David Powell; Mitchell Lewis; Ed Brady; Will Walling; Leigh Wyant; Lucien Littlefield
- Cinematography: Charles Edgar Schoenbaum
- Production company: Famous Players–Lasky Corporation
- Distributed by: Paramount Pictures
- Release date: September 17, 1922
- Running time: 60 minutes
- Country: United States
- Language: Silent (English intertitles)

The Siren Call is a 1922 American silent drama film directed by Irvin Willat and written by Philip D. Hurn, Victor Irvin and J.E. Nash. Starring Dorothy Dalton, David Powell, Mitchell Lewis, Ed Brady, Will Walling, Leigh Wyant and Lucien Littlefield, it was released on September 17, 1922, by Paramount Pictures.

== Premise ==
A love triangle set against the gold rush days in Alaska.

== Cast ==
- Dorothy Dalton as Charlotte Woods
- David Powell as Ralph Stevens
- Mitchell Lewis as Beauregard
- Ed Brady as Edward Brent
- Will Walling as Gore
- Leigh Wyant as Eleanor Du Bois
- Lucien Littlefield as Irishman
- George B. Williams as Judge Green

== Preservation status ==
The film survives in the George Eastman Museum film archive and in Moscow's Gosfilmofond archive.
