= One Night at Susie's =

1930 film

- theatrical release poster
- Directed by: John Francis Dillon
- Written by: Dialogue: Forrest Halsey; Kathryn Scola
- Screenplay by: John Francis Dillon; Forrest Halsey
- Starring: Billie Dove; Douglas Fairbanks Jr.
- Cinematography: Ernest Haller
- Edited by: Frank Ware
- Music by: Leo F. Forbstein
- Production company: First National Pictures
- Distributed by: First National Pictures
- Release date: October 19, 1930 (US)
- Running time: 57 minutes
- Country: United States
- Language: English

One Night at Susie's is a 1930 American pre-Code drama film released by First National Pictures and directed by John Francis Dillon. The movie stars Billie Dove and features Douglas Fairbanks Jr., Helen Ware and Tully Marshall.

== Plot ==
Susie, who runs a house for gangsters, is raising Dick Rollins, the son of a dead convict. Susie has raised Dick well, making sure that he was not influenced by her gangster friends. She even gets him a job as press agent. Dick falls in love with Mary, a chorus girl. When he announces his engagement, Susie becomes infuriated, because she believes that a girl of her type will urge him on to a life of crime. Her premonitions come to fruition. Hayes, who is producing Mary's show, gives her an engagement party. Dick is called to work, however, and Mary attends the party alone. Hayes attempts to rape her, and she shoots him in self-defense. Despite Mary's protests, Dick confesses to the murder and is convicted for manslaughter. While he is in prison, he writes a play for Mary, who tries to find a producer for the play but is turned down everywhere. Knowing how much the play means to Dick, she makes a deal with David Drake, who is willing to produce the play only if she submits to his sexual advances. The play is a success and makes Mary a star, which makes Dick happy when he hears the news. Houlihan, who had made advances to Mary previously but had been rejected, goes to Susie and tells her everything concerning Mary's sordid affair. At first, when Susie confronts her, Mary denies everything., but she eventually confesses and Susie promises to keep the whole affair a secret. When Dick is finally released, the lovers are happily reunited.

== Cast ==
- Billie Dove as Mary
- Douglas Fairbanks Jr. as Dick
- Helen Ware as Susie
- Tully Marshall as Buckeye Bill
- James Crane as Houlihan
- John Loder as Hayes
- Claude Fleming as Drake

== Preservation ==
The film survives intact and has been broadcast on television and cable. The film was transferred to 16mm film by Associated Artists Productions in the 1950s and shown on television. A 16mm copy is housed at the Wisconsin Center for Film and Theater Research. The film is also preserved in the Library of Congress collection.

== Home media ==
As of December 2015 One Night at Susie's has been available on the Warner Archive DVD label.
