= David Powell (actor) =

Scottish actor (1883–1925)

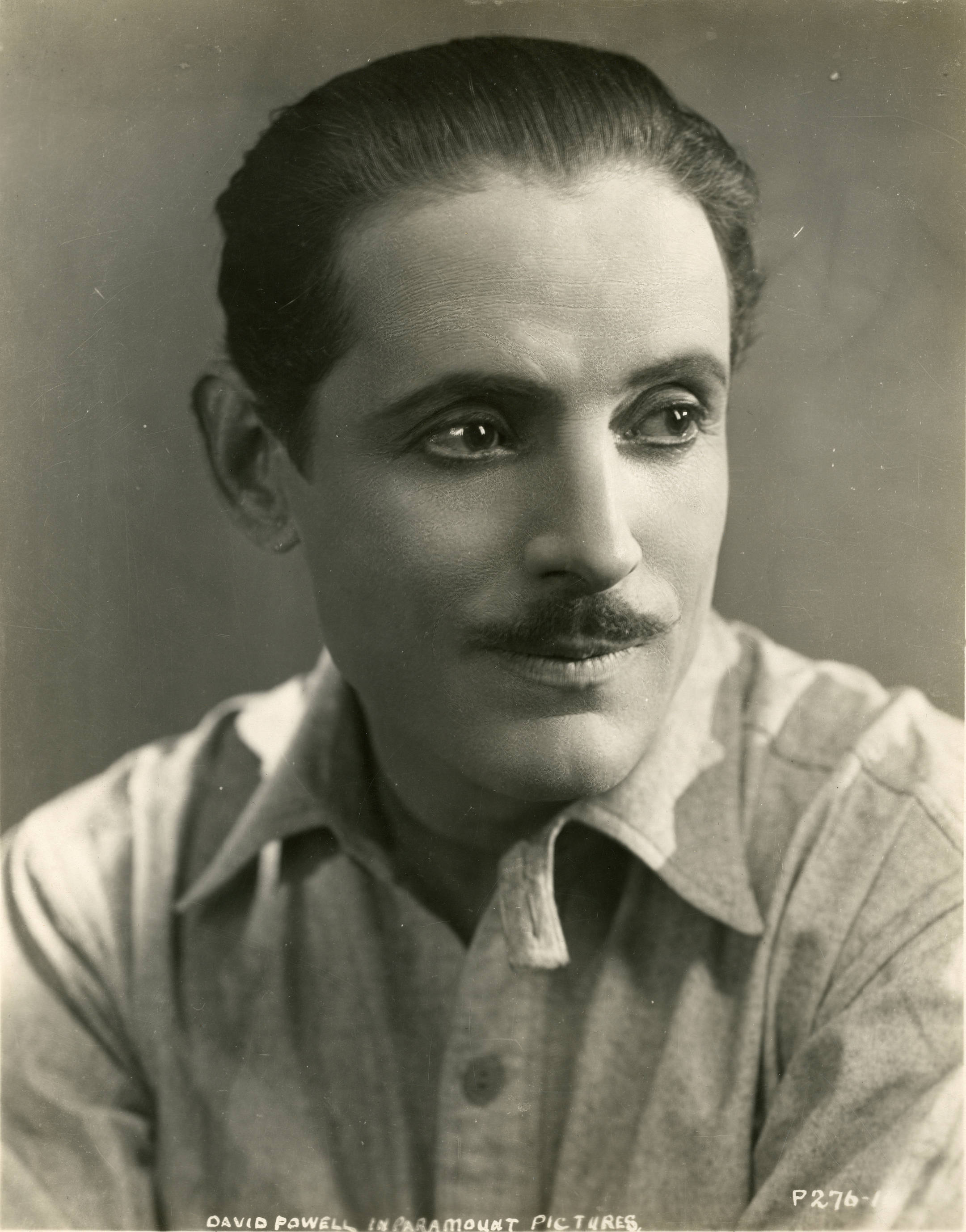
- Powell in 1922
- Born: December 17, 1883; Glasgow, Scotland
- Died: April 16, 1925 (aged 41); New York City, U.S.
- Occupation: Actor
- Years active: 1912–1925
- Spouse: Violet E. Powell

David Powell (December 17, 1883 – April 16, 1925) was a Scottish stage and later film actor of the silent era.

== Background ==
He was born in Glasgow. In his twenties Powell appeared in stage companies of Sir Herbert Beerbohm Tree, Ellen Terry, and Johnston Forbes-Robertson. In 1907 he appeared with Terry on Broadway in the first American presentation of Shaw's Captain Brassbound's Conversion.

In 1912, Powell started his film career in one to three reel shorts. At the beginning of the 1920s, he starred in several Paramount-produced English films. Extant films that feature Powell are The Dawn of A Tomorrow (1916), Less Than Dust (1916), Idols of Clay (1920), The Virtuous Liar (1924), The Green Goddess (1923 version), and The Average Woman (1924).

Powell died of pneumonia in New York City, New York, in April 1925, at the age of 41. He has a star on the Hollywood Walk of Fame.

== Partial filmography ==
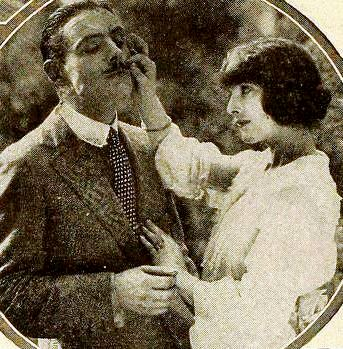
Powell and Marguerite Courtot in The Teeth of the Tiger (1919)

- One of Our Girls (1914)
- The Dawn of a Tomorrow (1915)
- The Fatal Card (1915)
- Gloria's Romance (1916)
- Less Than the Dust (1916)
- Outcast (1917)
- The Beautiful Adventure (1917)
- The Unforeseen (1917)
- The Price She Paid (1917)
- Maternity (1917)
- The Lie (1918)
- Her Husband's Honor (1918)
- The Better Half (1918)
- Her Great Chance (1918)
- His Parisian Wife (1919)
- The Woman Under Oath (1919)
- The Firing Line (1919)
- The Teeth of the Tiger (1919)
- Counterfeit (1919)
- On with the Dance (1920)
- Right to Love (1920)
- Lady Rose's Daughter (1920)
- Idols of Clay (1920)
- Appearances (1921)
- The Mystery Road (1921)
- The Princess of New York (1921)
- Dangerous Lies (1921)
- Her Gilded Cage (1922)
- Love's Boomerang (1922)
- The Spanish Jade (1922)
- The Siren Call (1922)
- Missing Millions (1922)
- Outcast (1922)
- Fog Bound (1923)
- The Green Goddess (1923)
- The Truth About Women (1924)
- The Man Without a Heart (1924)
- The Average Woman (1924)
- Lend Me Your Husband (1924)
- Virtuous Liars (1924)
- The Lost Chord (1925)
- Back to Life (1925)
