= The Iron Trail =

1921 film

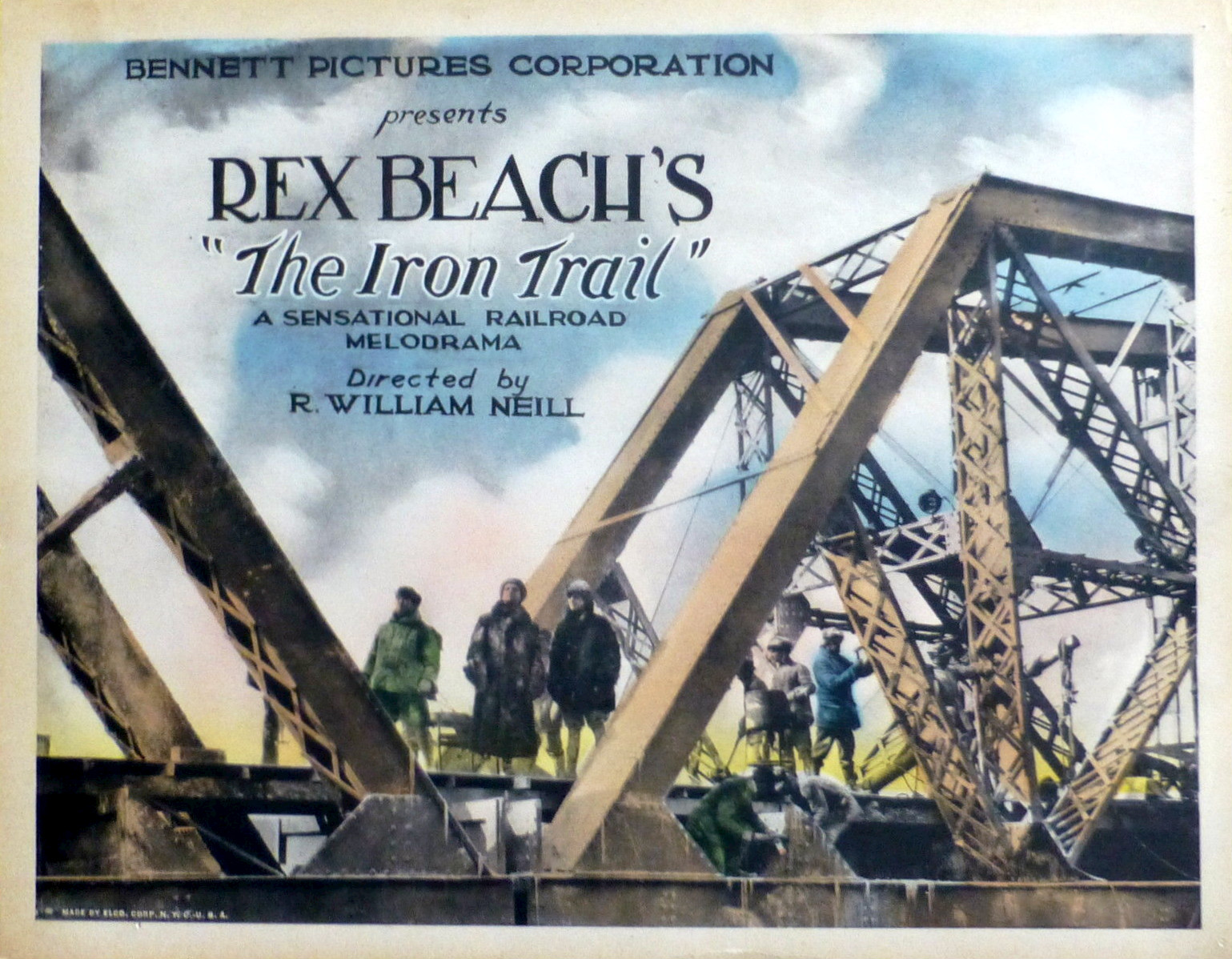
- Lobby card
- Directed by: Roy William Neill
- Screenplay by: Dorothy Farnum
- Based on: The Iron Trail by Rex Beach
- Produced by: Whitman Bennett
- Starring: Wyndham Standing; Thurston Hall; Reginald Denny; Alma Tell; Harlan Knight
- Cinematography: Ernest Haller
- Production company: Bennett Pictures
- Distributed by: United Artists
- Release date: October 30, 1921
- Running time: 70 minutes
- Country: United States
- Language: Silent (English intertitles)

The Iron Trail is a 1921 American silent adventure film directed by Roy William Neill and written by Dorothy Farnum. The film stars Wyndham Standing, Thurston Hall, Reginald Denny, Alma Tell, and Harlan Knight. The film was released on October 30, 1921, by United Artists.

== Plot ==
Competing efforts to build railways into interior Alaska in the early part of the 20th century.

== Cast ==
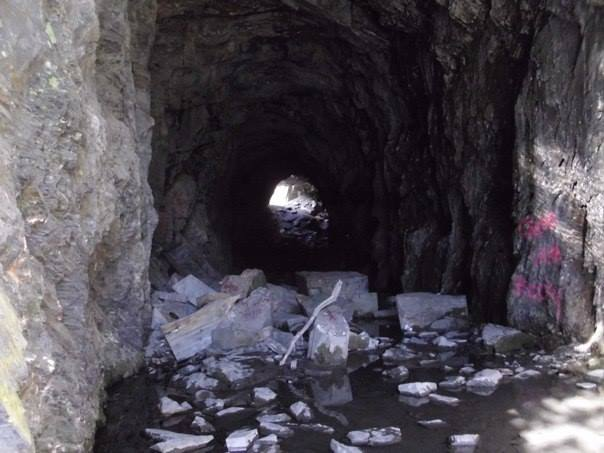
An unfinished, hand-cut railroad tunnel from the era portrayed in The Iron Trail

- Wyndham Standing as Murray O'Neil
- Thurston Hall as Curtis Gordon
- Reginald Denny as Dan Appleton
- Alma Tell as Eliza Appleton
- Harlan Knight as Tom Slater
- Betty Carpenter as Natalie
- Lee Beggs as Dr. Cyrus Gray
- Bert Starkey as Denny
- Danny Hayes as Linn
- Eulalie Jensen as Mrs. Gordon

== Preservation ==
This film is preserved at the Gosfilmofond archive in Moscow.
