= William B. Mack =

American actor

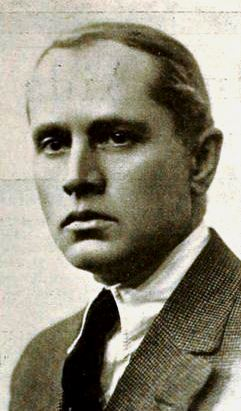
- William B. Mack in 1919
- Born: William B. McGillicuddy; April 8, 1872; Bay City, Michigan, US
- Died: September 13, 1955 (aged 83); East Islip, New York, US
- Education: University of Michigan
- Occupation: Actor

William B. Mack (born William B. McGillicuddy, April 8, 1872 – September 13, 1955) was an American stage and film actor. His Broadway roles included Hedda Gabler and Within the Law. His films included The American Venus and The Song and Dance Man.

== Career ==
Mack began his theatrical career in traveling productions, working with the companies of actors such as Clay Clement and Walker Whiteside and appearing in such plays as The Orphan of Geneva, The New Dominion, and A Southern Gentleman. In 1902 he joined the company of Minnie Maddern Fiske and began appearing in her Broadway productions. He abruptly left Fiske's company in December 1906 to take a role in Clyde Fitch's The Truth.

Mack began taking roles in silent films in 1919, when he appeared in Virtuous Men. His other film roles included Missing Millions (1922) and Backbone (1923). His final films were The American Venus and The Song and Dance Man, both in 1926.

== Personal life ==
Mack was born in Bay City, Michigan on April 8, 1872, with the last name McGillicuddy. He attended the University of Michigan, and was a longtime member of The Lambs, a theatrical society. He died at the Percy Williams Home for retired actors on September 13, 1955.
