= Paying the Piper (film) =

1921 film by George Fitzmaurice

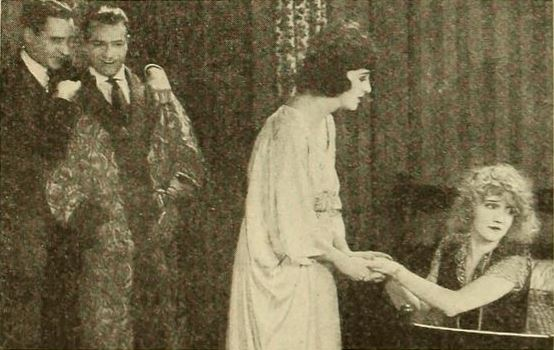
- Still from the film printed in a 1921 issue of Photoplay
- Directed by: George Fitzmaurice
- Screenplay by: Ouida Bergère
- Produced by: George Fitzmaurice; Adolph Zukor
- Starring: Dorothy Dickson; Alma Tell; George Fawcett; Rod La Rocque; Robert Schable; Katherine Emmet; Reginald Denny
- Cinematography: Arthur C. Miller
- Production company: Famous Players–Lasky Corporation
- Distributed by: Paramount Pictures
- Release date: January 16, 1921
- Running time: 60 minutes
- Country: United States
- Language: Silent (English intertitles)

Paying the Piper is a 1921 American silent society drama film directed by George Fitzmaurice and written by Ouida Bergère. The film stars Dorothy Dickson, Alma Tell, George Fawcett, and Rod La Rocque. The film was released on January 16, 1921, by Paramount Pictures.

== Cast ==
- Dorothy Dickson as Barbara Wyndham
- Alma Tell as Marcia Marillo
- George Fawcett as John Grahame
- Rod La Rocque as Larry Grahame
- Robert Schable as Charles R. Wyndham
- Katherine Emmet as Mrs. Wyndham
- Reginald Denny as Keith Larne

== Production ==
The working title of the film was Money Mad.

== Preservation ==
With no prints of Paying the Piper located in any film archives, it is considered a lost film. In February 2021, the film was cited by the National Film Preservation Board on their Lost U.S. Silent Feature Films list.
