= Her Great Chance =

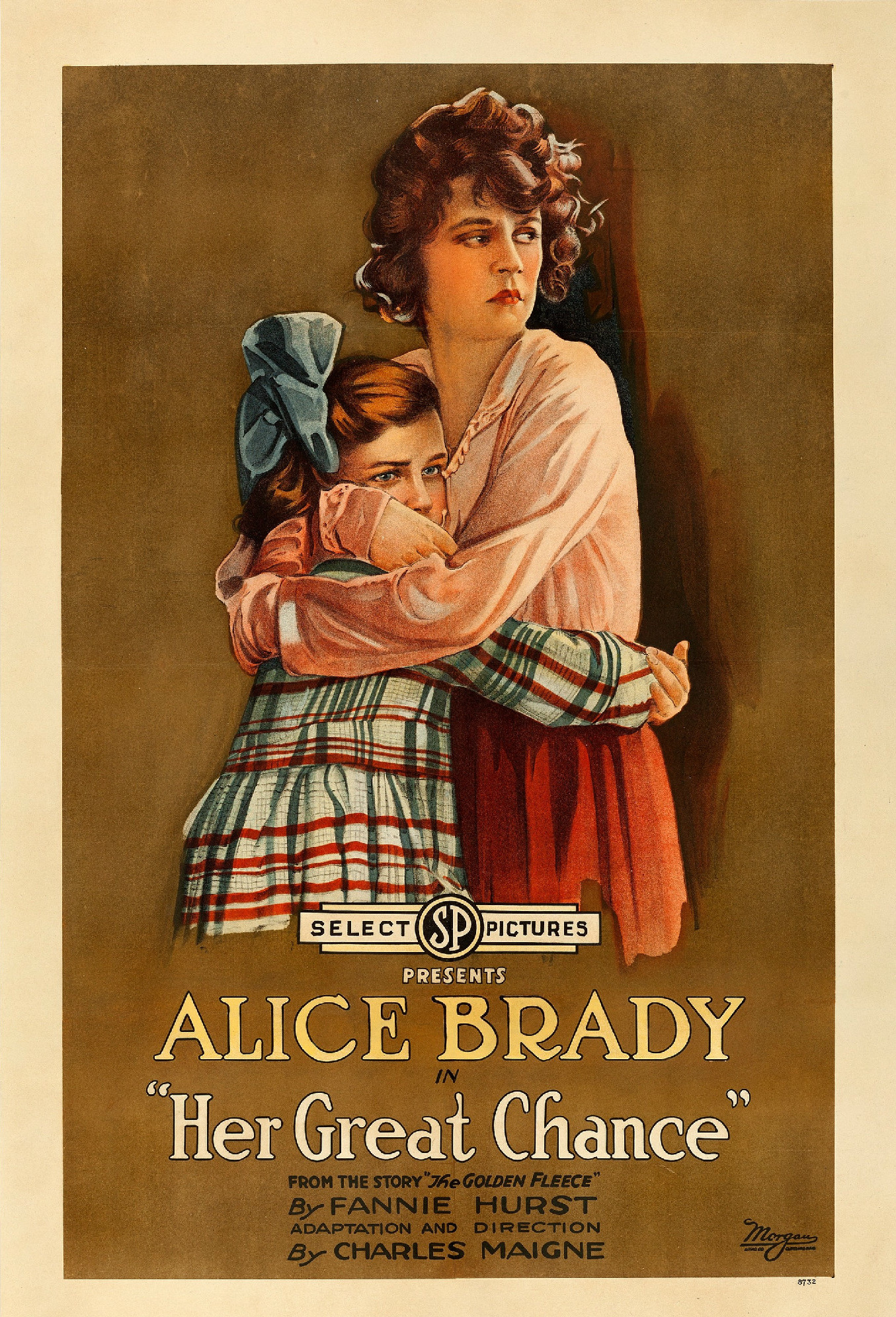
- lobby poster
- Directed by: Charles Maigne
- Written by: Charles Maigne
- Based on: a story by Fannie Hurst, Golden Fleece Cosmopolitan Magazine July 1917
- Produced by: Select Pictures
- Starring: Alice Brady; David Powell
- Cinematography: Leo Rossi
- Distributed by: Select Pictures
- Release date: October 1918
- Running time: 5 reels
- Country: USA
- Language: Silent..English titles

Her Great Chance is a lost 1918 silent film drama directed by Charles Maigne and starring Alice Brady. It was produced and released by Select Pictures.

== Cast ==
- Alice Brady - Lola Gray
- David Powell - Charles Cox
- Nellie Parker Spaulding - Mrs. Gray
- Gloria Goodwin - Ida Bell Gray
- Gertrude Barry - Genevieve
- Hardee Kirkland - Cox Sr
- Ormi Hawley - Kitty
- C. A. de Lima - Lawyer
- Jefferson De Angelis - Boniface
- Louis Sherwin -
- Tim Moore - His Great Chance (uncredited)
