= The Song and Dance Man =

1926 film

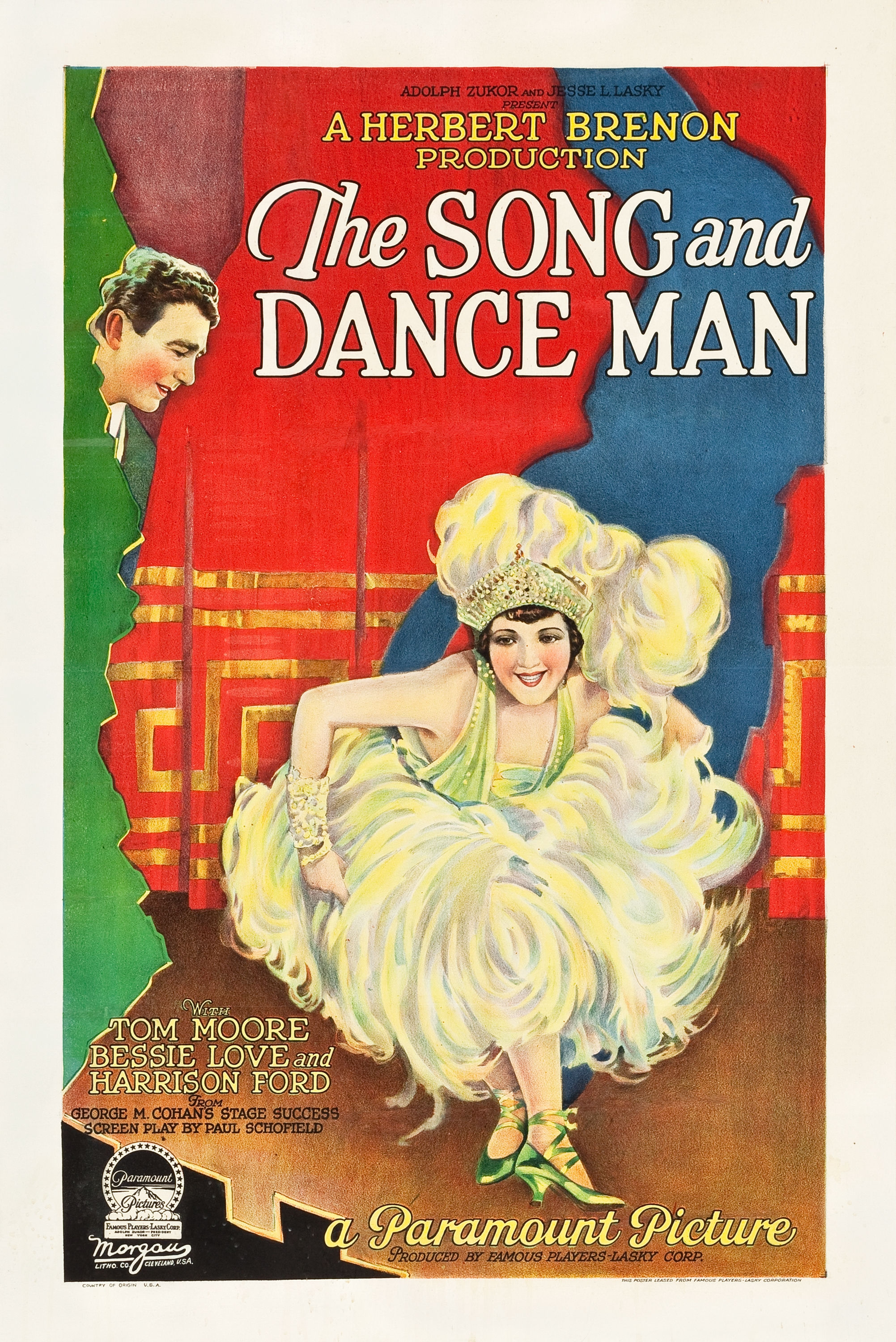
- Film poster
- Directed by: Herbert Brenon
- Screenplay by: Paul Schofield
- Based on: The Song and Dance Man (play) by George M. Cohan
- Produced by: Adolph Zukor; Jesse Lasky
- Starring: Tom Moore; Bessie Love
- Cinematography: James Wong Howe
- Production company: Famous Players–Lasky
- Distributed by: Paramount Pictures
- Release date: February 28, 1926 (U.S.)
- Running time: 70 minutes; 7 reels
- Country: United States
- Language: Silent (English intertitles)

The Song and Dance Man is a 1926 American silent comedy drama film produced by Famous Players–Lasky and released through Paramount Pictures. It is based on a play by George M. Cohan and was directed by Herbert Brenon. A copy of the film is housed in the Library of Congress collection. Of its original seven reels, only the final five survive.

== Plot ==
"Happy" Farrell wants to be a famous song-and-dance man. He befriends a young dancer, Leola, who accompanies him to an audition. Leola is given a contract, but Happy is not. Happy changes careers and becomes successful, yet still yearns to be a song-and-dance man. After three years, Leola plans to retire from dancing to get married, but Happy returns to pursue his original dream. Leola is inspired by this, and her fiancé agrees to let her continue her dancing career.

== Cast ==
- Tom Moore as Happy Farrell
- Bessie Love as Leola Lane
- Harrison Ford as Joseph Murdock
- Norman Trevor as Charles Nelson
- Bobby Watson as Fred Carroll
- Josephine Drake as Jane Rosemond
- George Nash as Inspector Craig
- William B. Mack as Tom Crosby
- Helen Lindroth as Marsha Lane
- Jane Jennings as Ma Carroll

== Reception ==
The film received mixed reviews. Although the actors were praised, the plot was criticized because the two leads were not reunited at the end of the film.

== Preservation ==
An incomplete print of The Song and Dance Man that is missing reel 1 is located in the Library of Congress.
