= The Better Half (film) =

1918 film

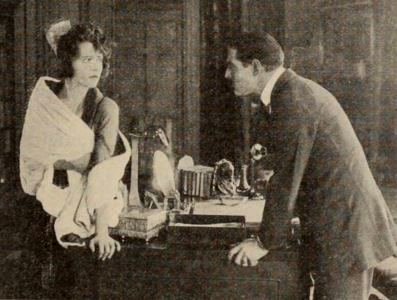
- Directed by: John S. Robertson
- Written by: Miriam Michelson (novel); Louis Sherwin
- Produced by: Lewis J. Selznick
- Starring: Alice Brady; David Powell; Crauford Kent
- Cinematography: H. Lyman Broening
- Production company: Selznick Pictures
- Distributed by: Selznick Pictures
- Release date: September 1918
- Running time: 50 minutes
- Country: United States
- Languages: Silent; English intertitles

The Better Half is a 1918 American silent drama film directed by John S. Robertson and starring Alice Brady, David Powell and Crauford Kent.

== Plot summary ==
Louise and Trixie Thorley are twins, one is kind-hearted and the other selfish. Although Louise loves Michael Thwaite, he is dazzled by the pampered Trixie and marries her. Trixie soon tires of Michael and departs for Europe with Hendrick Thurston, "an idler." The night she leaves him, Michael is attacked by thugs and loses his sight. To spare his feelings, Louise tends to him posing as Trixie. When Trixie returns, the twins argue, and Trixie kills herself in a fit of remorse. Michael finally regains his sight and, realizing Louise's love, marries her.

== Cast ==
- Alice Brady as Louise / Beatrix Thorley
- David Powell as Michael Thwaite
- Crauford Kent as Hendrick Thurston
- William T. Carleton as Judge Thorley
- Isabel O'Madigan as Mrs. Corlandt
- Richard Allen as Doctor

== Bibliography ==
- Connelly, Robert B. The Silents: Silent Feature Films, 1910-36, Volume 40, Issue 2. December Press, 1998.
- Munden, Kenneth White. The American Film Institute Catalog of Motion Pictures Produced in the United States, Part 1. University of California Press, 1997.
