= Alma Tell =

American actress (1898–1837)

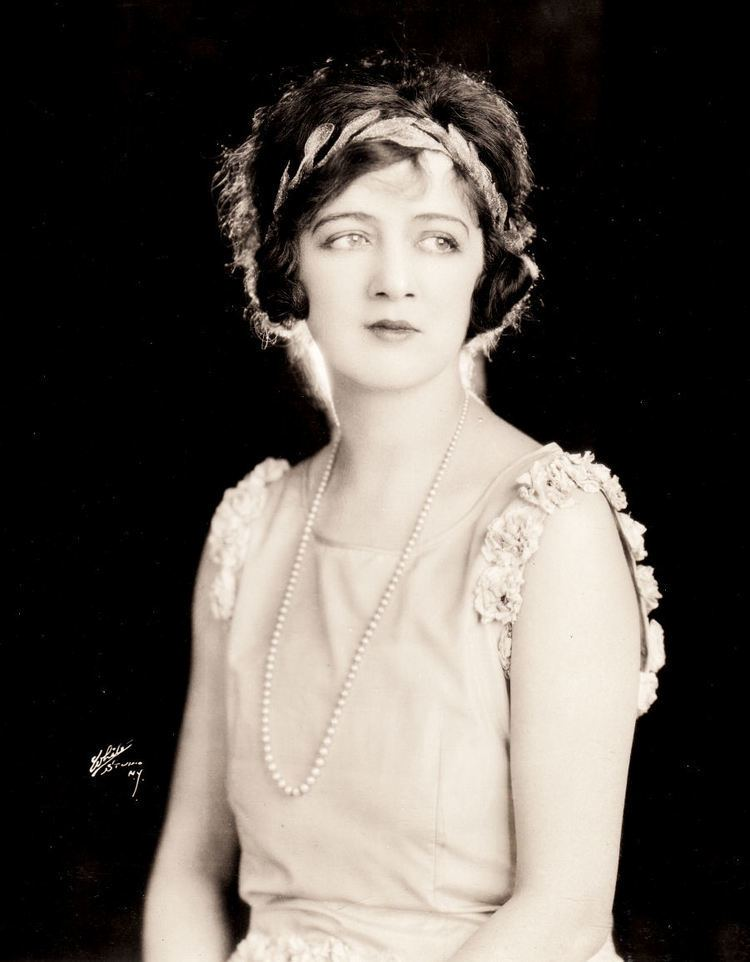
- Tell c. 1920
- Born: March 27, 1898; New York City, U.S.
- Died: December 29, 1937 (aged 39); Hollywood, California, U.S.
- Resting place: Valhalla Memorial Park Cemetery
- Occupation: Actress
- Years active: 1915–1934
- Spouse: Stanley Blystone (m. 1932)
- Relatives: Olive Tell (sister)

Alma Tell (March 27, 1898 – December 29, 1937) was an American stage and motion picture actress whose career in cinema began in 1915 and lasted into the sound films of the early 1930s.

== Early years ==
Tell was born in New York City, the younger sister of stage and film actress Olive Tell. She attended schools in London and Paris and, with her sister, Olive, graduated from the American Academy of Dramatic Arts in 1915.

== Career ==
Tell began her career as an actress in Syracuse, working for 12 weeks in stock theater. She acted in Boston and headed a stock company in Newark. She had a supporting role on Broadway for the 1925 comedy These Charming People by Michael Arlen.

She made her screen debut in the Edward José-directed drama Simon, the Jester, released in September 1915. Tell's career never paralleled that of her older sister, and she often was cast in films as the second leading lady.

Throughout the 1920s, Tell appeared opposite such leading silent film actresses as Mae Murray, Corinne Griffith and Madge Kennedy and then achieved leading lady status in 1923's The Silent Command, opposite actors Edmund Lowe, Martha Mansfield and Béla Lugosi, in his first American film role.

Tell made her last film appearance in the 1934 romantic-drama Imitation of Life, which starred Claudette Colbert.

== Personal life and death ==
Tell was married to actor Stanley Blystone from 1932 until her death. She died as the result of a heart attack in 1937 and was buried at Pierce Brothers Valhalla Memorial Park Cemetery, North Hollywood, Los Angeles, California.

== Selected filmography ==
- The Smugglers (1916)
- Nearly Married (1917)
- Right to Love (1920)
- On with the Dance (1920)
- Paying the Piper (1921)
- The Iron Trail (1921)
- Broadway Rose (1922)
- The Silent Command (1923)
- San Francisco Nights (1928)
- Love Comes Along (1930)

== Theater appearances ==
- The Squab Farm (1918)
