= Missing Millions =

1922 film

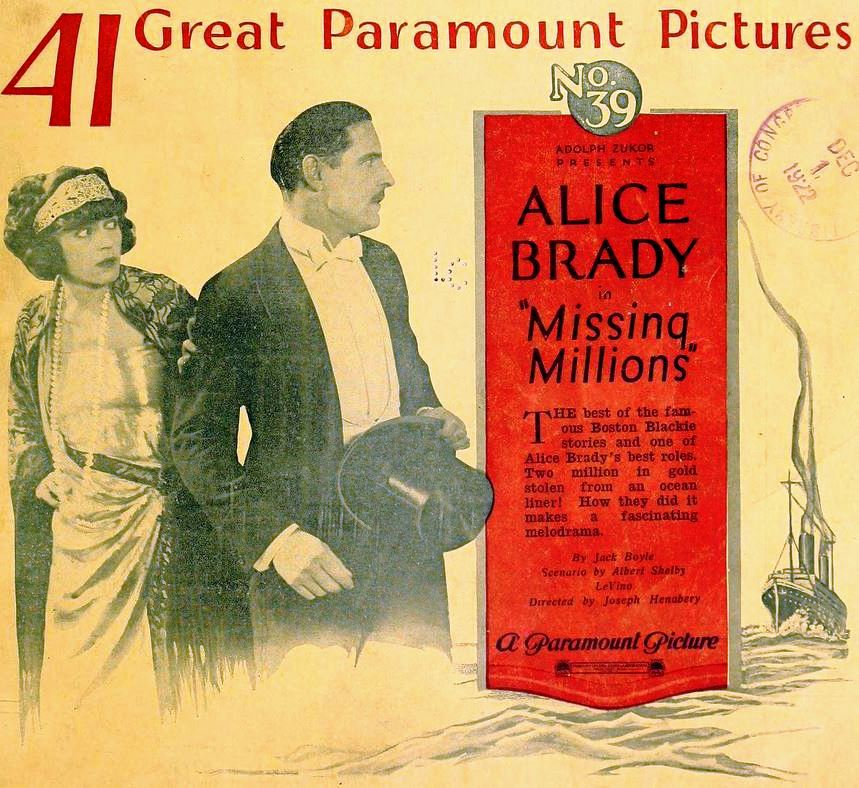
- Advertisement
- Directed by: Joseph Henabery
- Screenplay by: Jack Boyle; Albert S. Le Vino
- Produced by: Adolph Zukor
- Starring: Alice Brady; David Powell; Frank Losee; Riley Hatch; John B. Cooke; William B. Mack; George LeGuere
- Cinematography: Gilbert Warrenton
- Production company: Famous Players–Lasky Corporation
- Distributed by: Paramount Pictures
- Release date: September 17, 1922
- Running time: 60 minutes
- Country: United States
- Language: Silent (English intertitles)

Missing Millions is a lost 1922 American silent drama film directed by Joseph Henabery and written by Jack Boyle and Albert S. Le Vino. The Boston Blackie film stars Alice Brady, David Powell, Frank Losee, Riley Hatch, John B. Cooke, William B. Mack, and George LeGuere. The film was released on September 17, 1922, by Paramount Pictures.

== Cast ==
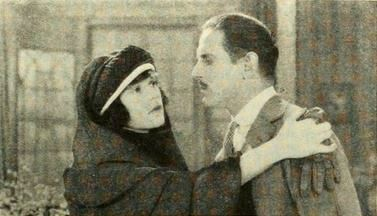
Alice Brady and David Powell in Missing Millions

- Alice Brady as Mary Dawson
- David Powell as Boston Blackie
- Frank Losee as Jim Franklin
- Riley Hatch as Detective John Webb
- John B. Cooke as Handsome Harry Hawks
- William B. Mack as Thomas Dawson
- George LeGuere as Daniel Regan
- Alice May as Mrs. Regan
- H. Cooper Cliffe as Sir Arthur Cumberland
- Sydney Deane as Donald Gordon
- Beverly Travers as Claire Dupont
- Sidney Herbert as Frank Garber

== Preservation status ==
With no holdings located in archives, Missing Millions is considered to be a lost film.
