= Counterfeit (1919 film) =

1919 film by George Fitzmaurice

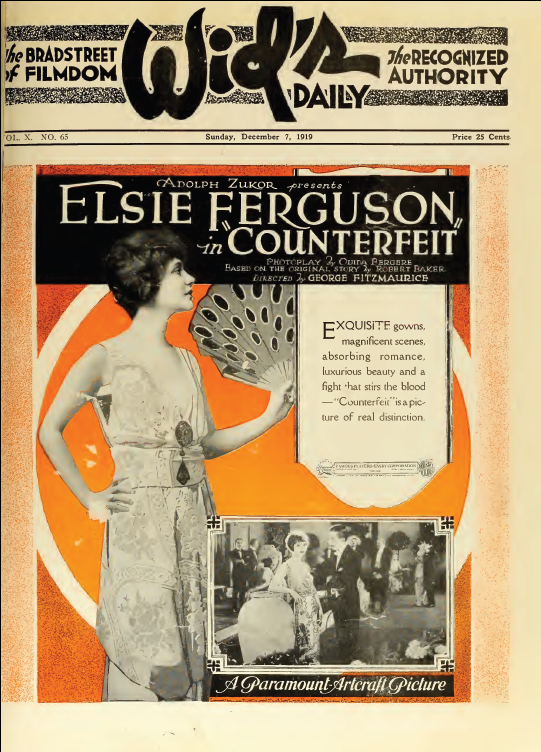
- Ad for the film on the cover of a 1919 issue of Wid's Daily
- Directed by: George Fitzmaurice
- Written by: Robert M. Baker (story); Ouida Bergère (scenario)
- Produced by: Adolph Zukor; Jesse L. Lasky
- Starring: Elsie Ferguson; David Powell
- Cinematography: Arthur C. Miller
- Production company: Famous Players–Lasky/Artcraft
- Distributed by: Paramount Pictures
- Release date: November 30, 1919
- Running time: 50+ minutes
- Country: United States
- Language: Silent (English intertitles)

Lobby card

Lobby card

Counterfeit is a 1919 American silent detective drama film directed by George Fitzmaurice and starring Elsie Ferguson. The assistant director was C. Van Arsdale.

The picture was the fourth film Fitzmaurice and Ferguson worked on together.

== Plot ==
As described in a film magazine, Virginia Griswold, whose family is in financial straits, resolves to remedy the situation by finding the source of widely distributed counterfeit bills, as a large reward is offered for the capture of the maker of the fake bills. A clue takes her to Newport where she poses as one of the idle rich and falls in love with Stuart Kent, a man of means, who returns her affection. Vincent Cortez, about whom little is known, also becomes enamored of Virginia and she accepts his affections, much to the consternation of Stuart. She offers no acceptable explanation to Stuart for this. Carefully and craftily she leads Vincent to the point of sharing confidences, although this course greatly enrages Stuart and for a time threatens to bring open rupture of their relationship. After Vincent admits he is the counterfeiter, however, Virginia brings Stuart to an understanding of the situation and a happy conclusion.

== Cast ==
- Elsie Ferguson as Virginia Griswold
- David Powell as Stuart Kent
- Helen Montrose as Mrs. Palmer
- Charles Kent as Colonel Harrington
- Charles K. Gerard as Vincent Cortez
- Ida Waterman as Mrs. Griswold
- Robert Lee Keeling as Mr. Palmer
- Fred Jenkins as Uncle Ben
- Mrs. Robertson as Aunt Jemima
- Elizabeth Breen as Marinette, the Maid

== Preservation ==
With no prints of Counterfeit located in any film archives, it is considered a lost film. In February 2021, the film was cited by the National Film Preservation Board on their Lost U.S. Silent Feature Films list.
