= The Right to Love (1920 film) =

1920 film by George Fitzmaurice

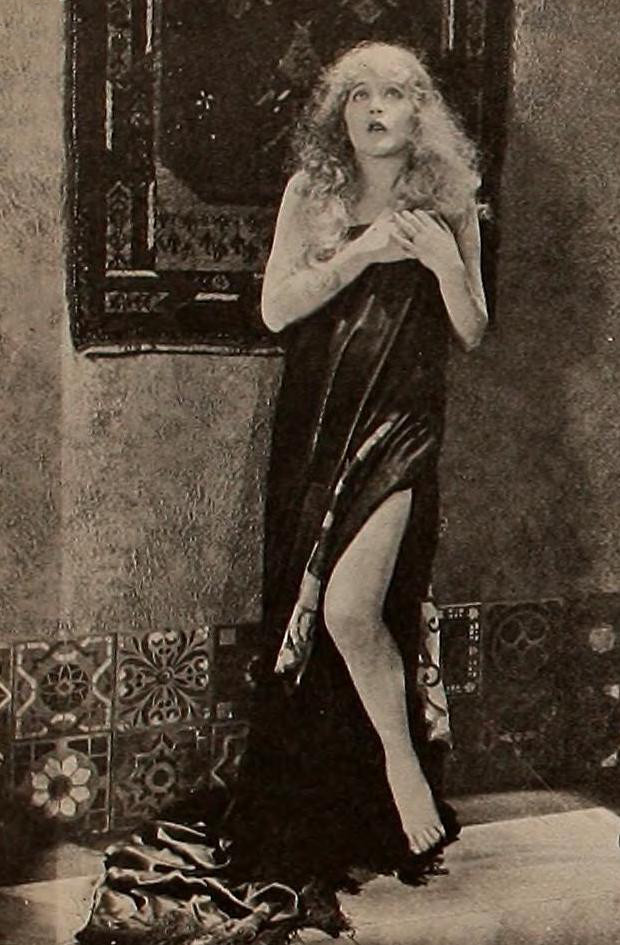
- Still from the film with Mae Murray printed in a 1920 issue of Motion Picture News
- Directed by: George Fitzmaurice
- Written by: Ouida Bergère
- Based on: L'Homme qui assassina by Claude Farrère L'Homme qui assassina by Pierre Frondaie
- Produced by: Adolph Zukor
- Starring: Mae Murray; David Powell; Holmes Herbert
- Cinematography: Arthur C. Miller
- Production company: Famous Players–Lasky
- Distributed by: Paramount Pictures
- Release date: September 5, 1920
- Running time: 70 minutes
- Country: United States
- Language: Silent (English intertitles)

The Right to Love is a 1920 American silent drama film directed by George Fitzmaurice. It stars Mae Murray, David Powell and Holmes Herbert. The film is based on the French novel L'Homme qui assassina, by Claude Farrère and the play of the same name by Pierre Frondaie.

Location shooting for the film was done in Miami, Florida and the Florida Keys.

== Plot ==
As described in a film magazine, summoned in her desperation to help her in her anguish at the threatened separation from her child, American soldier Colonel Richard Loring is witness to the blackguard conspiracy of Lord Archibald Falkland to dishonor his wife. Lady Falkland married the English ambassador to Turkey to satisfy her father's greed for wealth, and was a youthful sweetheart of Loring's in America. Their romance was shattered by her enforced marriage to the Ambassador, who insists on keeping in their home in Constantinople his mistress Lady Edith, an English woman. These two plot the compromise of the wife in a situation with Prince Cerniwicz and her separation from her boy Little Archibald, and the outcome is the murder of Lord Falkland by the Colonel. Because of a remembered obligation, a Turkish nobleman throws the guilt from Loring and the two lovers are reunited.

Lobby card

== Cast ==
- Mae Murray as Lady Falkland
- David Powell as Colonel Richard Loring
- Holmes Herbert as Lord Archibald Falkland
- Alma Tell as Lady Edith
- Frank Losee as Marshal to the Sultan
- Macey Harlam as Prince Stanislaus Cerniwicz
- Marcia Harris as Governess
- Lawrence Johnson as Little Archibald

== Preservation ==
A complete print of The Right to Love is held by the EYE Film Institute Netherlands in Amsterdam.

== See also ==
- Stamboul (1931)
- The Man Who Murdered (1931)
