= Carnival (1931 film) =

1931 British film by Herbert Wilcox

- Directed by: Herbert Wilcox
- Written by: Donald Macardle
- Produced by: Harley Knoles; Herbert Wilcox
- Starring: Matheson Lang; Joseph Schildkraut; Kay Hammond; Chili Bouchier
- Cinematography: Freddie Young; Jack Parker
- Edited by: Maclean Rogers
- Production company: British & Dominions Film Corporation
- Release date: 30 October 1931
- Running time: 88 minutes
- Country: United Kingdom
- Language: English

Carnival (also known as Venetian Nights) is a 1931 British drama film in black and white with colour sequences, directed by Herbert Wilcox and starring Matheson Lang, Joseph Schildkraut, Kay Hammond and Chili Bouchier. It was written by Donald Macardle and produced by the British & Dominions Film Corporation. It is a remake of the 1921 film Carnival.

== Plot ==
During a performance of Othello a jealous actor attempts to strangle his wife who he believes has committed adultery.

== Cast ==
- Matheson Lang as Silvio Steno
- Chili Bouchier as Simonetta Steno
- Joseph Schildkraut as Count Andrea Scipio
- Lilian Braithwaite as Italia
- Kay Hammond as Nella
- Brian Buchel as Lelio
- Dickie Edwards as Nino
- Brember Wills as stage manager
- Alfred Rode and His Royal Tzigane Band as performers at carnival

== Reception ==
Film Weekly wrote: "The picturesque backgrounds, the glorious photography, the effective musical treatment, the economical dialogue, and the general glamour of Carnival are qualities that outweigh many faults and make it a film of importance."

Kine Weekly wrote: "The story is perhaps a little familiar, but it is given colour by the glamour of the stage which furnishes the background, and strength through the personality and powerful histrionics of Matheson Lang. ... Although the familiar story adheres to the obvious in development, it is beautifully decorated and expands with rhythmic movement and ease of action which is all too rare in British pictures."

The Daily Film Renter wrote: "Herbert Wilcox has used dialogue with restraint and music and effects with real artistry in this talkie version of a story which made one of the most successful silent films on record. Pictorial values are high as a result, and with good leading acting making the most of the essentially popular material, Carnival, with its proved appeal to the women, bears all the marks of a big box-office success."
