= Helen Bertram =

American actress (1865/69–1953)

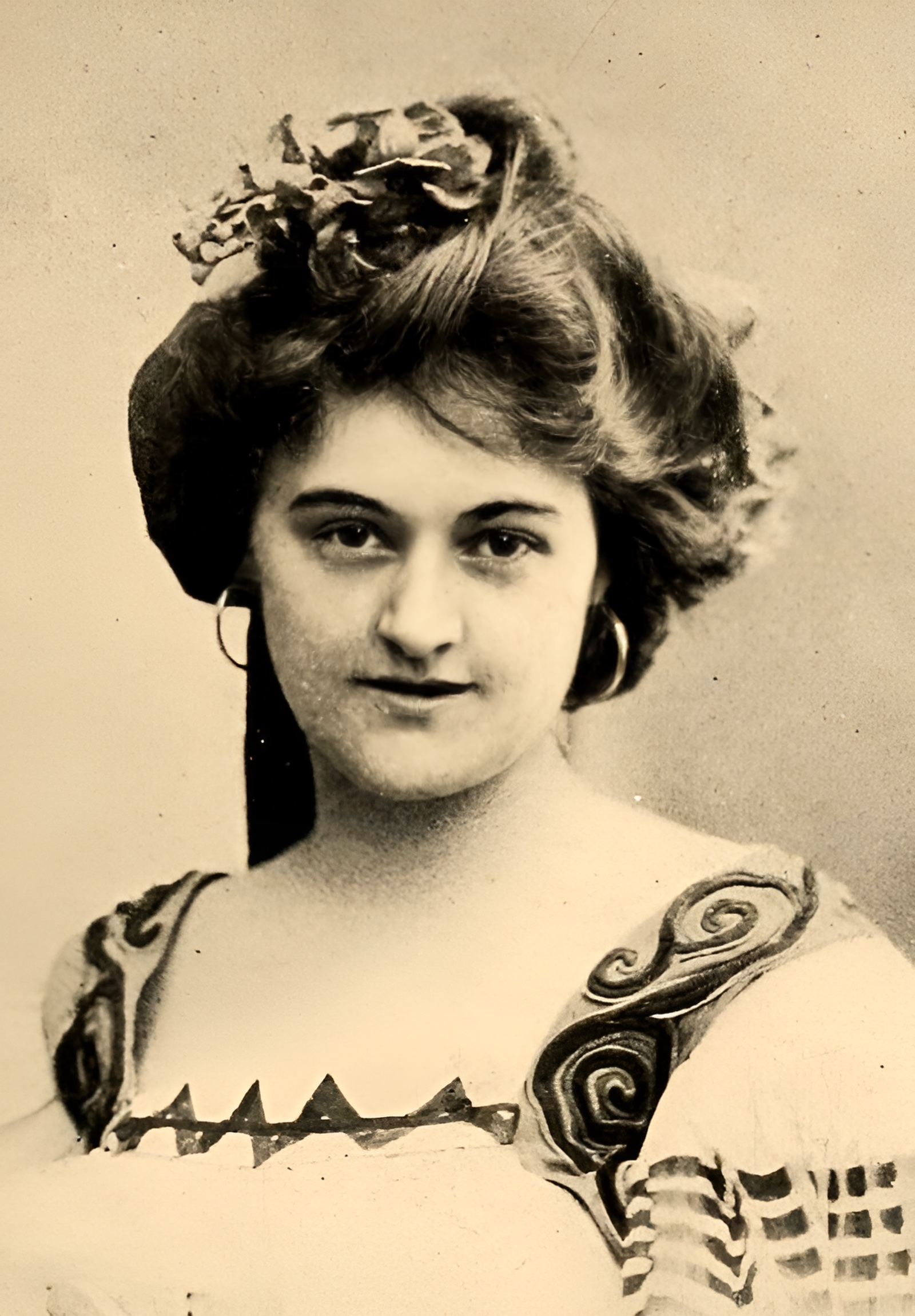
- Helen Bertram, from a 1901 publication.
- Born: Lula May Burt; August 30, 1865 (or 1869); Tuscola, Illinois, U.S.
- Died: September 24, 1953 (aged 84–88); Los Angeles, California, U.S.
- Occupations: Actress, singer in light opera, vaudeville
- Spouse(s): Achille Tomasi (m. 1888–94); Edward J. Henley (m. 1894–97); Edward J. Morgan (m. 1903–06)
- Children: Rosina Henley
- Relatives: William Ernest Henley (brother-in-law); Harley Knoles (son-in-law)

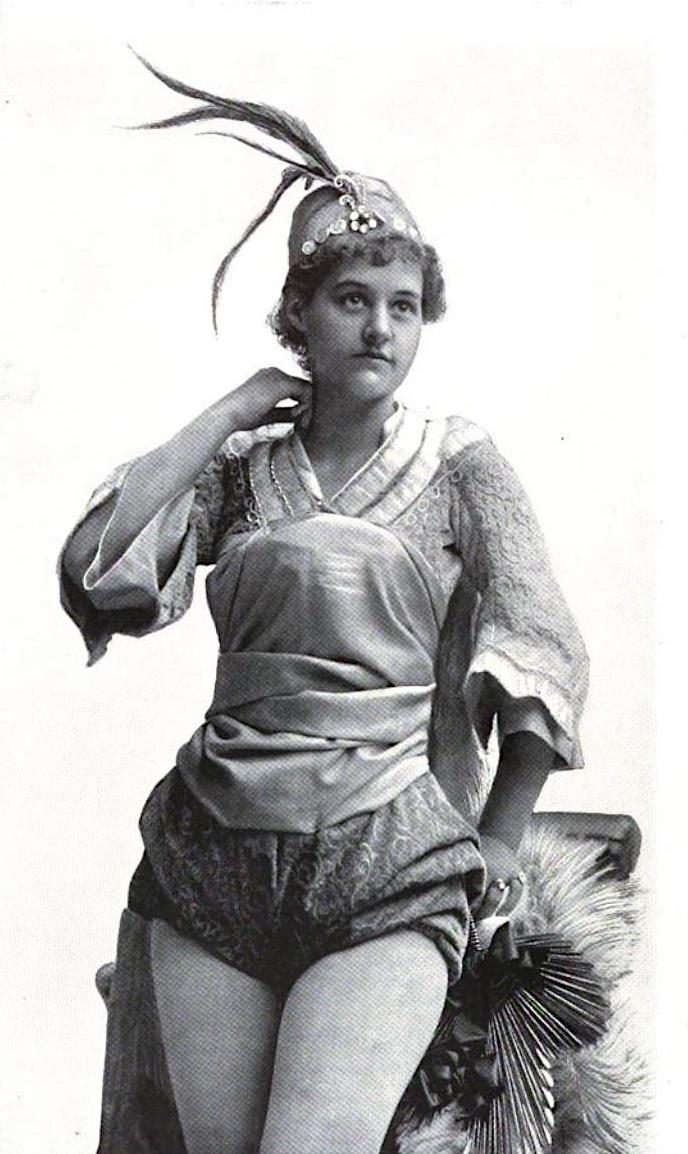
Helen Bertram, from an 1891 publication.

Helen Bertram (born Lulu May Burt; August 30, 1865 – September 24, 1953) was an American actress and singer in comic opera and musical theatre. She was also known for her tumultuous private life.

== Early life ==
Lula May Burt was born in 1865 (some sources give 1869) in Tuscola, Illinois, the daughter of William Neal Burt and Caroline Burr Burt. She was raised in Paris, Illinois and in Indianapolis, Indiana. She studied voice with Tecla Vigna at the Cincinnati Conservatory of Music.

== Career ==
Bertram sang in comic opera with the Emma Abbott Opera Company, the Heinrich Conried Opera Company, the Bostonians, the McCaull Comic Opera Company, Henry E. Abbey's English Opera Company, and the Carl Rosa Opera Company. Her roles included Selena in Mignon, Serpolette in The Chimes of Normandy, Arline in The Bohemian Girl, Adalgisa in Norma, Prince Julius in The King's Fool, Farina in The Tar and the Tartar (for which she danced barefoot), and Stella in Clover.

On Broadway, she appeared in musicals Robin Hood (1900), The Viceroy (1900), Foxy Quiller (1900), The Prince of Pilsen (1903), The Gingerbread Man (1905–1906), The Land of Nod and the Song Birds (1907), and again in Robin Hood (1932). Bertram appeared in two films, The Lightning Conductor (1914), a silent picture which included her daughter in the cast, and Rhythm on the River (1940), with Bing Crosby and Mary Martin. She also appeared in vaudeville shows.

She and her daughter were both active in the suffrage movement in Los Angeles.

== Personal life ==
Events in Helen Bertram's private life were regularly detailed in newspapers, including adultery, divorce, embezzlement, and bankruptcy. Among her reported eccentricities, she wore a gold locket or chamois pouch containing her second husband's ashes, for several years after his death.

Bertram married three times, to Italian musician Achille Tomasi (from 1888 to 1894), English actor Edward J. Henley, a younger brother of poet William Ernest Henley (from 1894 to 1897), and English actor Edward J. Morgan (from 1903 to his death in 1906). She divorced Tomasi; her other two husbands died. She had one daughter with Tomasi, actress and screenwriter Rosina Henley (1890–1978), who took and kept her stepfather's name; Rosina Henley married British film director Harley Knoles. Bertram moved to Los Angeles in 1910. Helen Bertram died in 1953 in Los Angeles.
