= Philip Hatkin =

Latvia-born cinematographer

- Born: August 4, 1885; Riga, Russian Empire
- Died: December 18, 1923 (aged 38); Bronx, New York City, New York state, U.S.
- Occupation: Cinematographer

Philip Hatkin was a Latvia-born cinematographer who worked in Hollywood during the early silent era. He shot dozens of films between 1915 and 1921. He frequently collaborated with directors like George Archainbaud and Harley Knoles.

== Biography ==
Philip was born in Riga, Latvia (at that time part of the Russian Empire), to Hessel Hatkin and Sadie Sachs. He came to the United States with his family around 1893, according to census records.

Before he began working as a cinematographer at World Film Corporation, he was a photographer for over a decade. He was a member of the Cinema Camera Club in New York City. In 1922, he returned to New York City after spending two years in Europe for work. He died in the Bronx a year later.

He and his wife, Rebecca Levine, had a daughter named Goldie.

== Selected filmography ==
- The Old Nest (1921)
- Carnival (1921)
- The Great Shadow (1920)
- A Romantic Adventuress (1920)
- Half an Hour (1920)
- Guilty of Love (1920)
- Bolshevism on Trial (1919)
- Home Wanted (1919)
- The Social Pirate (1919)
- The Zero Hour (1918)
- The Man Hunt (1918)
- The Divine Sacrifice (1918)
- The Awakening (1917)
- A Maid of Belgium (1917)
- The Iron Ring (1917)
- The Brand of Satan (1917)
- The False Friend (1917)
- Yankee Pluck (1917)
- Moral Courage (1917)
- As Man Made Her (1917)
- The Man Who Forgot (1917)
- The Yellow Passport (1916)
- The Men She Married (1916)
