= The Adopted Son =

The Adopted Son may refer to:

- The Adopted Son (1917 film), a 1917 American silent film directed by Charles Brabin
- An alternative name for Beshkempir, aka Beshkempir the Adopted Son, a 1998 Kyrgyz language film
