= Julia Burnham =

American screenwriter and novelist active during Hollywood's silent era

- Occupation: Screenwriter
- Years active: 1917–1920

Julia Burnham was an American screenwriter and novelist active during Hollywood's silent era. Burnham joined the scenario staff at Metro in 1920 after spending time at Fox.

== Selected filmography ==
- The Fatal Hour (1920)
- Lure of Ambition (1919)
- Love, Honor and -- ? (1919)
- The Love Auction (1919)
- The Call of the Soul (1919)
- A Soul Without Windows (1918)
- Wanted: A Mother (1918)
- The Volunteer (1917)
- Adventures of Carol (1917)
- The Little Duchess (1917)
