= The Master Hand =

1915 film by Arthur Edeson, Harley Knoles

- Directed by: Harley Knoles; Arthur Edeson (assistance director)
- Written by: Harley Knoles; Carroll Fleming (play)
- Based on: The Master Hand by Carroll Fleming
- Produced by: Premo Feature Film Corp.
- Starring: Nat C. Goodwin
- Cinematography: Arthur Edeson
- Distributed by: World Film Company
- Release date: August 23, 1915
- Running time: 5 reels
- Country: USA
- Language: Silent..English titles

The Master Hand is a 1915 silent film drama directed by Harley Knoles and starring Nat C. Goodwin. It is based on a 1907 play The Master Hand by Carroll Fleming. It was released by World Film Company.

== Cast ==
- Nat C. Goodwin - John Bigelow
- Theodore Babcock - James Rallston
- Julia Stuart - Mrs. Rallston
- Florence Malone - Jean Rallston
- Carroll Fleming - Ed Pembroke
- Alex Calvert - Dr. Garside
- Clarissa Selwynne - Miss Lane, the lady doctor
- Katherine Lee - Dot
- Madge Evans - Jean as a child

== Preservation status ==
- Only a fragment of the film remains between two archives the Library of Congress and the National Archives of Canada(Ottawa).
- Prints and/or fragments were found in the Dawson Film Find in 1978.
