= Beauty for Sale =

1933 film

- Lobby card
- Directed by: Richard Boleslawski
- Screenplay by: Eve Greene; Zelda Sears
- Based on: Beauty; 1933 novel by Faith Baldwin
- Produced by: Lucien Hubbard
- Starring: Madge Evans; Alice Brady; Otto Kruger; Una Merkel
- Cinematography: James Wong Howe
- Edited by: Blanche Sewell
- Music by: William Axt (uncredited)
- Production company: Metro-Goldwyn-Mayer
- Distributed by: Loew's, Inc.
- Release date: September 1, 1933
- Running time: 87 minutes
- Country: United States
- Language: English

Beauty for Sale is a 1933 American pre-Code film about the romantic entanglements of three beauty salon employees. Based on the 1933 novel Beauty by Faith Baldwin, it stars Madge Evans, Alice Brady, Otto Kruger and Una Merkel.

== Plot ==
Small town woman Letty Lawson moves to New York City and lives in a boarding house run by Mrs. Merrick. Eventually she asks her friend and Mrs. Merrick's daughter, Carol, to get her a job at her workplace, an exclusive beauty salon owned by Madame Sonia Barton. Though both Carol and her brother Bill, who is in love with her, warn her that it is not a fit place for a young woman of good character, Letty insists she knows what she is getting into.

After proving herself, Letty is sent on a house call to attend to spoiled, scatterbrained, chatty Mrs. Sherwood. When she leaves, she discovers her hat has been chewed up by Mrs. Sherwood's Pekingese. Lawyer Mr. Sherwood returns home and is quite fond of Letty and offers her to go and buy her an expensive replacement. By chance, she meets him again when they both seek shelter from a rainstorm in the same place. Sherwood is delighted when a fear of lightning makes Letty reflexively seek the comfort of his arms several times. They start seeing each other, though nothing very improper occurs.

Meanwhile, Carol has a rich, older, indulgent boyfriend, Freddy Gordon, while Jane, another salon employee, is secretly seeing Burt, Madame Sonia's mining engineer son.

Finally, Sherwood asks Letty to take the next step in their relationship. She asks for a week to think it over.

Carol convinces Freddy to take her along on his business trip to Paris. While seeing her off aboard the ocean liner, Letty runs into the Bartons. When Letty later mentions that Burt is leaving on the same ship as Carol, Jane becomes very upset. It turns out that Burt had promised to marry her the next day after she told him she was pregnant. Though Letty tries to comfort her, late that night Jane leaps from her window to her death.

Influenced by the examples of both Jane and Carol (after her first and only love turned out to be a married man who eventually went back to his wife, she became calculating and cynical), Letty turns Sherwood down. Then, she reluctantly agrees to marry Bill.

Specifically requested by Mrs. Sherwood, Letty is forced by Madame Sonia to go to her home. When her client notices her engagement ring, she reveals that she is getting married soon. Mr. Sherwood coolly congratulates her. However, on the wedding day, she cannot go through with it.

The next day, Mrs. Sherwood asks her husband for a divorce so she can marry Robert Abbott, the architect of the new country mansion she had commissioned. She tells him that she will ask for no alimony, as she is independently wealthy. Sherwood is furious, as it is after Letty's supposed wedding, but is quite willing to let his wife go.

Carol, having finally gotten Freddy to propose, goes house hunting. The real estate agent takes them to see the Sherwood mansion. When he reveals that it is being sold because the couple are divorcing, Letty rushes over to the real estate office to stop the sale and be reunited with her love.

== Cast ==
- Edward J. Nugent as Bill Merrick
- May Robson as Mrs. Merrick
- Louise Carter as Mrs. Lawson
- Madge Evans as Letty Lawson
- Una Merkel as Carol Merrick
- Isabel Jewell as Hortense, the salon manager
- Florence Auer as Mrs. Milsner (uncredited)
- Florine McKinney as Jane
- Maidel Turner as Mrs. Gillespie, a Customer (uncredited)
- Lillian Harmer as Customer in Curling Machine (uncredited)
- Claire Du Brey as Wife (uncredited)
- Hedda Hopper as Madame Sonia Barton
- Phillips Holmes as Burt Barton
- Alice Brady as Mrs. Henrietta Sherwood
- Otto Kruger as Mr. Sherwood
- Charley Grapewin as Freddy Gordon (as Charles Grapewin)
- John Roche as Robert Abbott, the architect

further:

- Symona Boniface as Mrs. Fletcher (uncredited)
- Elise Cavanna as Hat Saleslady (uncredited)
- Nell Craig as Miss Farrell, Sherwood's Secretary (uncredited)
- Catherine Doucet as Mrs. Gardner (uncredited)

== Reception ==
The New York Times critic Frank Nugent had a mixed reaction, calling Beauty for Sale "a strange composite of good and bad." "The story is reminiscent of so many others", but "the cast works miracles and Richard Boleslavsky, the director, has displayed considerable acumen" so that "at times, therefore, one is happily deluded into the feeling that the picture has freshness and a certain originality."
