= Rosina Henley =

American actress and screenwriter

- Born: Rosina Tomasi; November 18, 1890; Manhattan, New York, US
- Died: July 5, 1978 (aged 87); New York, New York, US
- Occupation(s): Actress, screenwriter
- Spouse: Harley Knoles
- Children: William Henry Knoles (aka Clyde Allison)
- Relatives: William Ernest Henley (uncle)

Rosina Henley (November 18, 1890 - July 5, 1978) was an American actress and screenwriter active during Hollywood's silent era. She was married to British film director Harley Knoles, with whom she frequently collaborated.

== Biography ==
Rosina Tomasi was born in Manhattan to Italian musician Achille Tomasi and opera singer Helen Bertram. Her father died when she was young, and she took her stepfather (E.J. Henley)'s surname. She was largely raised by her mother.

She made her own stage debut in 1907 at the age of 15, and from there forged a career as a stage actress. She and her mother moved to Los Angeles in 1910, where she continued performing and took on motion picture acting work.

She made her debut as a scenarist on 1920's Guilty of Love, directed by her future husband. After their marriage, the pair relocated to London, where they continued their work in the industry. Her last known credit was The Bohemian Girl (1922). She died on July 5, 1978, aged 88. She was survived by her son, author William Henry Knoles (pen name Clyde Allison).

== Selected filmography ==
As actress:

- Courage for Two (1919)
- Wanted: A Mother (1918)
- The Gates of Gladness (1918)
- The Strong Way (1917)
- Adventures of Carol (1917)
- The Burglar (1917)
- Health by the Year (1915) (short)
- The Sign of the Cross (1914)
- The Lightning Conductor (1914)

As writer:

- The Bohemian Girl (1922)
- Carnival (1921)
- A Romantic Adventuress (1920)
- Guilty of Love (1920)
