= Oh, Baby! (1926 film) =

1926 American film

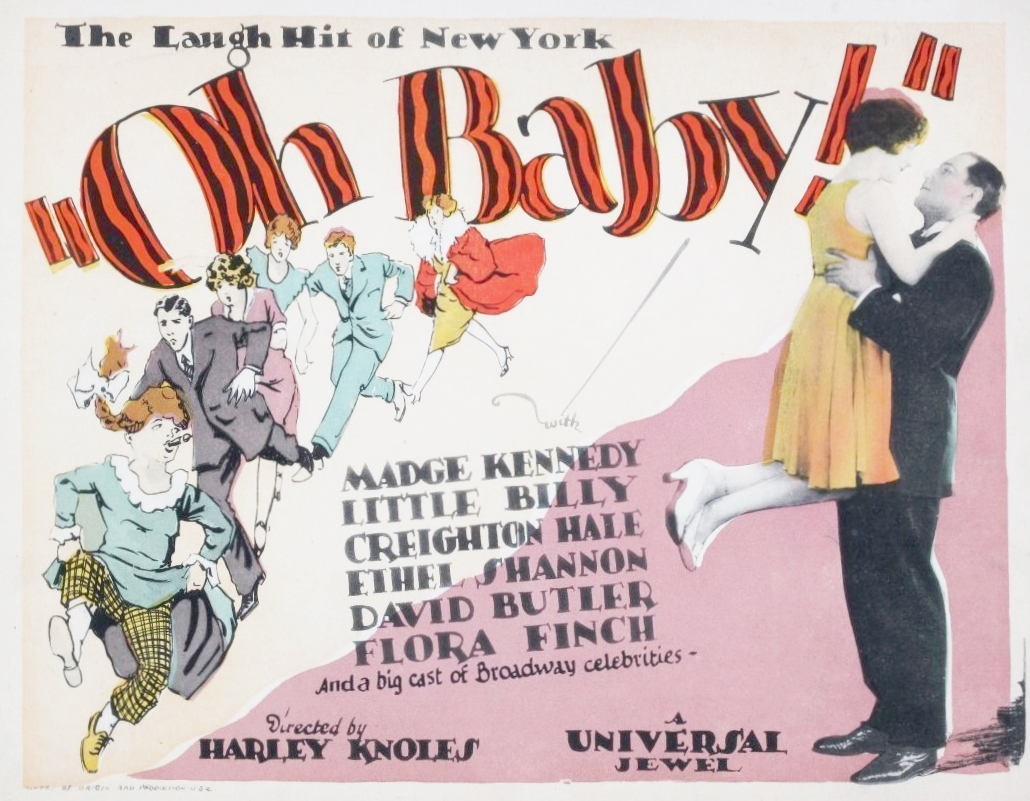
- Directed by: Harley Knoles
- Written by: Arthur Hoerl
- Produced by: Carl Laemmle; Al Lichtman
- Starring: David Butler; Madge Kennedy; Creighton Hale
- Cinematography: Stuart Kelson; Marcel Le Picard
- Production company: Universal Pictures
- Distributed by: Universal Pictures
- Release date: August 7, 1926
- Running time: 70 minutes
- Country: United States
- Languages: Silent; English intertitles

Oh, Baby! is a 1926 American silent comedy-drama film directed by Harley Knoles and starring David Butler, Madge Kennedy and Creighton Hale.

== Cast ==
- 'Little Billy' Rhodes as Billy Fitzgerald
- David Butler as Jim Stone
- Madge Kennedy as Dorothy Brennan
- Creighton Hale as Arthur Graham
- Ethel Shannon as Mary Bond
- Flora Finch as Aunt Phoebe
- Damon Runyon as man at ringside
- Jimmy Cannon as himself
- Ring Lardner as himself
- Graham McNamee as himself
- Grantland Rice as himself
- Jim Savage as Boxer

== Bibliography ==
- Munden, Kenneth White. The American Film Institute Catalog of Motion Pictures Produced in the United States, Part 1. University of California Press, 1997.
