= The Little Duchess =

1917 silent drama film

- Directed by: Harley Knoles
- Written by: Julia Burnham
- Produced by: William A. Brady
- Starring: Madge Evans; Pinna Nesbit; Jack Drumier
- Cinematography: Alfred Moses
- Production company: World Film
- Distributed by: World Film
- Release date: August 20, 1917
- Running time: 50 minutes
- Country: United States
- Languages: Silent; English intertitles

The Little Duchess is a 1917 American silent drama film directed by Harley Knoles, and starring Madge Evans, Pinna Nesbit, and Jack Drumier. The film was shot at World Film's studios in Fort Lee, New Jersey.

== Cast ==
- Madge Evans as Geraldine Carmichael
- Pinna Nesbit as Evelyn Carmichael
- Jack Drumier as Earl of Carinmore
- J. Gunnis Davis as Jim Dawson
- Patrick Foy as Jim Snyder
- Maxine Elliott Hicks as Sophia Dawson
- James Sheridan as Billy
- Nellie Anderson as Mrs. Dawson
- Charles Hartley as Pop Hinkle
- Richard Clarke as Bradford
- Harry Bartlett as Hobson
- Nora Cecil as Orphanage Matron
- Ivan Dobble as A. Carmichael

== Bibliography ==
- Paul C. Spehr. The Movies Begin: Making Movies in New Jersey, 1887-1920. Newark Museum, 1977.
