= Leslie Stowe =

American actor

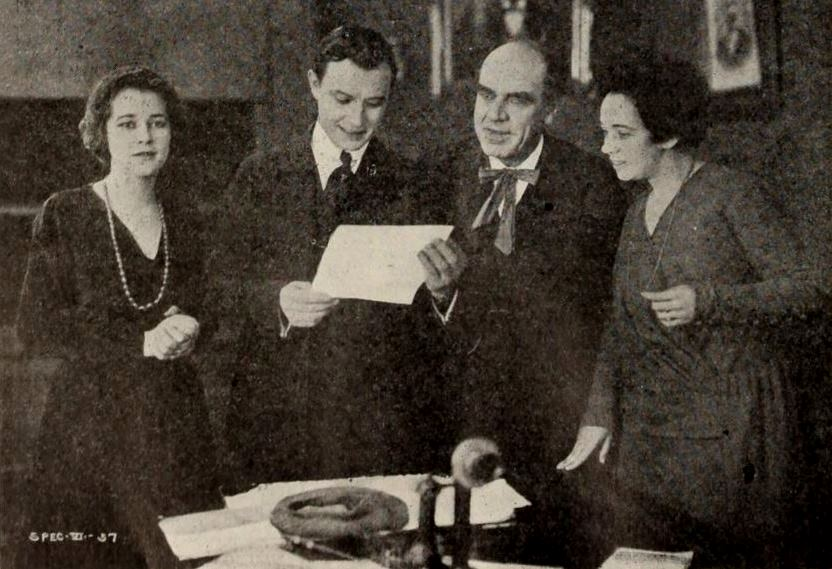
- Born: November 1867; Louisiana, Louisiana, U.S.
- Died: July 16, 1949; Englewood, New Jersey, New Jersey, U.S.
- Occupation: Actor

Leslie Stowe (November 1867 – July 16, 1949) was an American actor. He appeared on stage and screen. He played the evil Herman Wolff character in Bolshevism on Trial. Anthony Slide praised his performance as the film's villain.

Stowe was born in Homer, Louisiana. A resident of the Actors' Fund Home in Englewood, New Jersey for the final 17 years of his life, he died at Englewood Hospital on July 16, 1949.

== Filmography ==
- Robin Hood (1912), film debut
- La Bohème (1916)
- The Closed Road (1916)
- The Adopted Son (1917)
- Bolshevism on Trial (1919)
- The Copperhead (1920)
- The Good-Bad Wife (1920)
- Peggy Puts It Over (1921)
- No Trespassing (1922)
- The Seventh Day (1922)
- Driven (1923)
- Second Fiddle (1923)
- Christopher Columbus (1923)
- Tongues of Flame (1924)
- Mother's Boy (1929)
