= The Burglar (1917 film) =

1917 silent film directed by Harley Knoles

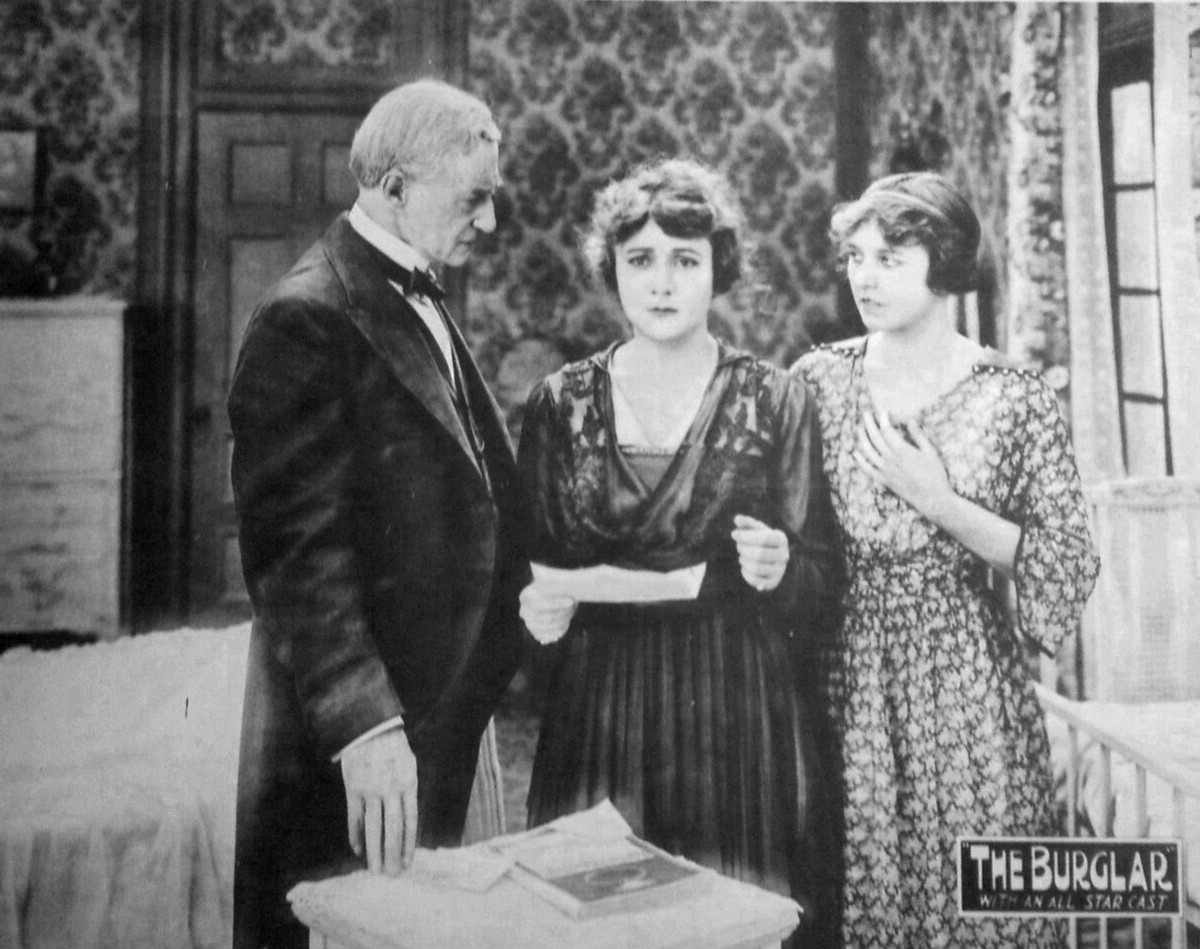
- Lobby card
- Directed by: Harley Knoles
- Written by: Virginia Tyler Hudson
- Based on: Editha's Burglar (1887 play) by Augustus Thomas; Editha's Burglar: A Story for Children (1888 novel) by Frances Hodgson Burnett
- Produced by: William A. Brady
- Starring: Carlyle Blackwell; Madge Evans; Evelyn Greeley
- Cinematography: André Barlatier (Fr. Wikipedia)
- Production company: World Film
- Distributed by: World Film
- Release date: October 29, 1917 (U.S.)
- Running time: 50 minutes
- Country: United States
- Language: Silent (English intertitles)

The Burglar is a 1917 American silent drama film directed by Harley Knoles and starring Carlyle Blackwell, Madge Evans and Evelyn Greeley.

== Plot ==
As a prank, college student William Lewis and some of his friends, including Sid Burns, break into a house. They have a party using the wines in the cellar. They are interrupted by a police officer, who is accidentally shot. Sid accuses Will of shooting the police officer. Will leaves town to escape, and moves to a big city where he meets and falls in love with Alice Hammond. The pair marry and have a daughter and Will settles into life as a bank teller. But one day Sid arrives in the city and threatens to expose Will's past, unless Will helps him with a bank robbery.

Scared, Will opens the safe for Sid. But a police officer comes in. Sid states Will put him up to the robbery and tells him about Will's past. Will is tried and sentenced to twenty years in jail. During that time, he tries to escape and succeeds, although the guards think they have shot him as he attempted to flee, and report to his wife Alice that he has died.

Time passes, Alice marries Paul Benton, a journalist and one-time rival of Will's for Alice's love. They move to a new area. Will, who escaped jail, has turned to burglary to survive. One night, he unwittingly breaks into Alice and Paul's home and is interrupted in his burglary by his daughter Editha. The girl says she will give Will her possessions if he leaves. One item is a locket with a picture of Alice in it. Will realizes who Editha is and hugs her.

Paul and Alice hear the noise and come downstairs. Alice is shocked to find her husband is alive. Will leaves the house but is spotted by a police officer who shoots him. In the ensuing scene it is discovered that Sid had admitted he shot the police officer and Will was found to be innocent. Will is vindicated and hugs his daughter before succumbing to his wound and dies.

== Cast ==
- Carlyle Blackwell as William Lewis
- Madge Evans as Editha
- Evelyn Greeley as Alice Hamilton
- Harry Lamont as Sid Burns
- Richard Clarke as William's Father
- Justine Cutting as William's Stepmother
- Rosina Henley as Fanny Hamilton
- Frank Mayo as Paul Benton
- Victor Kennard as Ned Hamilton
- Jack Drumier as John Hamilton
- Henry Drehle as Rural Policeman
