= Comrades: A Story of Social Adventure in California =

1909 novel by Thomas Dixon, Jr.

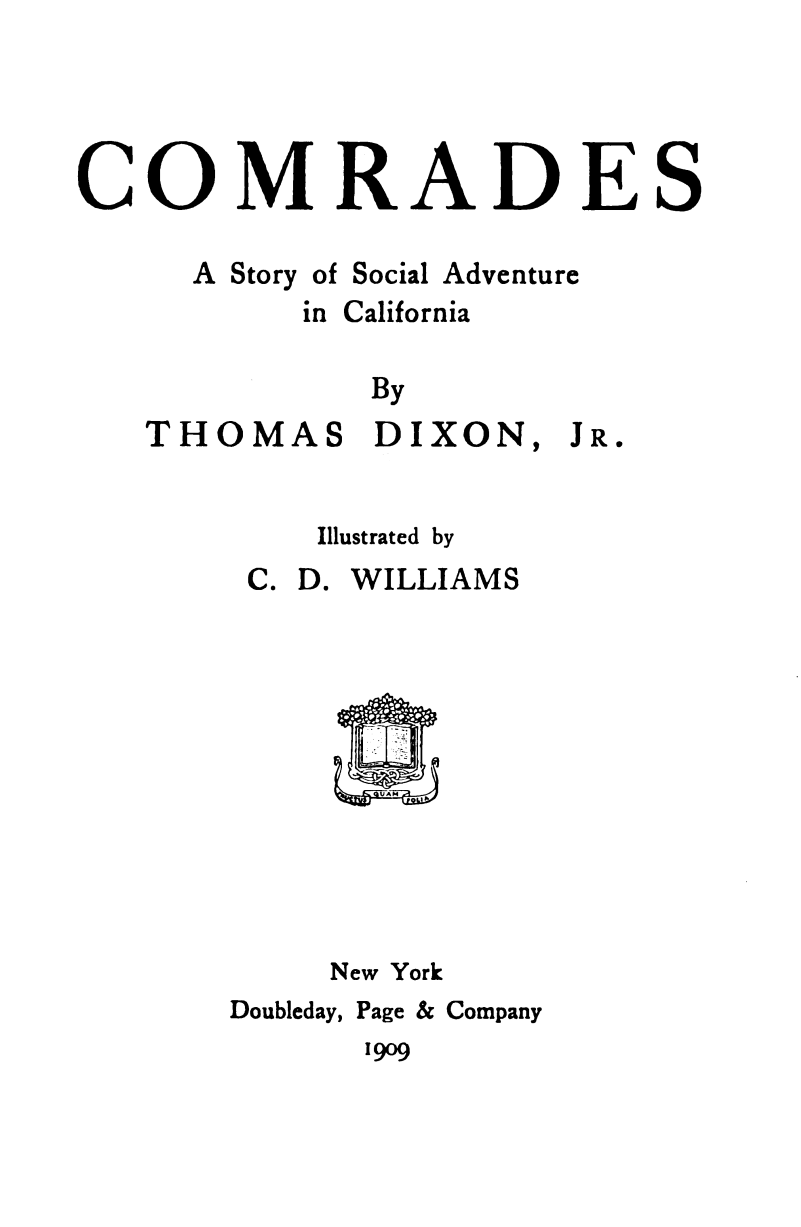
- Title page of the first edition of Comrades.
- Authors: Thomas Dixon Jr.
- Language: English
- Publisher: Doubleday, Page & Company
- Publication date: 1909
- Pages: 319

Comrades: A Story of Social Adventure in California is a 1909 novel by Thomas Dixon Jr. It deals with the establishment of a socialist commune on a Californian island and its subsequent unraveling. Widely reviewed, it was later adapted as a play and as a film.

== Plot summary ==
Colonel Worth, a Confederate veteran, lives in San Francisco, California with his guardian Elena and his son Norman. At the outset of the novel, Col. Worth talks about the Battle of Manila of the Spanish–American War in the Philippines, especially Admiral George Dewey's damage done to the Spanish fleet. Meanwhile, his guardian and son go to a socialist meeting. Indeed, his son Norman becomes infatuated with Barbara Bozenta, a socialist figure, and hosts a socialist meeting at Col. Worth's country house near Berkeley on July 4, American Independence Day. The meeting is canceled when Norman attempts to put up the Red Flag as opposed to the American flag.

Worth buys the island of Ventura for his son Norman. Located off the coast of Santa Barbara, it is meant for Norman to establish a socialist commune there. When his socialist friends fail to work, law and order needs to be restored. However, Comrades Herman and Catherine Wolf take over as heads of the commune, and sentence Norman to work in the stables, under the threat of the lash. Productivity falls as workers know they must work nine hours a day, and thus work slowly. When Norman finds a way to find gold on the beach, the device is stolen by Wolf. Wolf's wife Catherine then leaves for Santa Barbara, deeming family life to be too capitalistic.

Eventually, Norman reaches out to his father and to the Governor of California, who liberate the island. The Red flag is replaced with the American flag.

== Main themes ==
The book deals with the Bolshevik threat to the United States. It has been described as 'a treatise against communism' by biographer Anthony Slide.

== Critical reception ==
A review published in The New York Times on February 6, 1909, suggested the characters were badly portrayed. In April 1909, critic H. L. Mencken criticized the novel, describing it as 'intolerably amateurish' and a 'stupid quasi-novel.' He added, 'towards the end the very badness of the book began to exercise a nefarious fascination.' He concluded that the novel was a reflection of 'every weakness, fault, misdemeanor known to prose fiction, from incredible characterization to careless proofreading, and from preposterous dialogue to trashy illustrations.'

Reviewer R. E. Bisbee in the July 1909 issue of Arena suggested the caricature of socialism made Dixon come across as an 'irrational teller of tales.' More recently, biographer Anthony Slide criticized the novel, saying 'the writing appears as rushed as the novel's conclusions.' He went on to add that the character were 'not sufficiently drawn out.'

The novel has been compared to 1984 and Animal Farm by George Orwell in its ability to show the ineptitude of socialism. However, Slide suggests it is a parody of the socialist novels of Upton Sinclair. Moreover, it has been suggested that the character of Barbara Bozenta was based on anarchist Emma Goldman.

== Theatrical and cinematic adaptations ==
The novel was adapted as a play entitled The Red Dawn. However, the characters have different names and the plot varies slightly. Its first performance took place on August 6, 1919, at the 39th Street Theatre in New York City.

Furthermore, the novel was adapted into a film in 1919. It was entitled Bolshevism on Trial. The film strayed from the plot of the novel, as it was set in Palm Beach, Florida as opposed to San Francisco.
