= A Romantic Adventuress =

1920 film by Harley Knoles

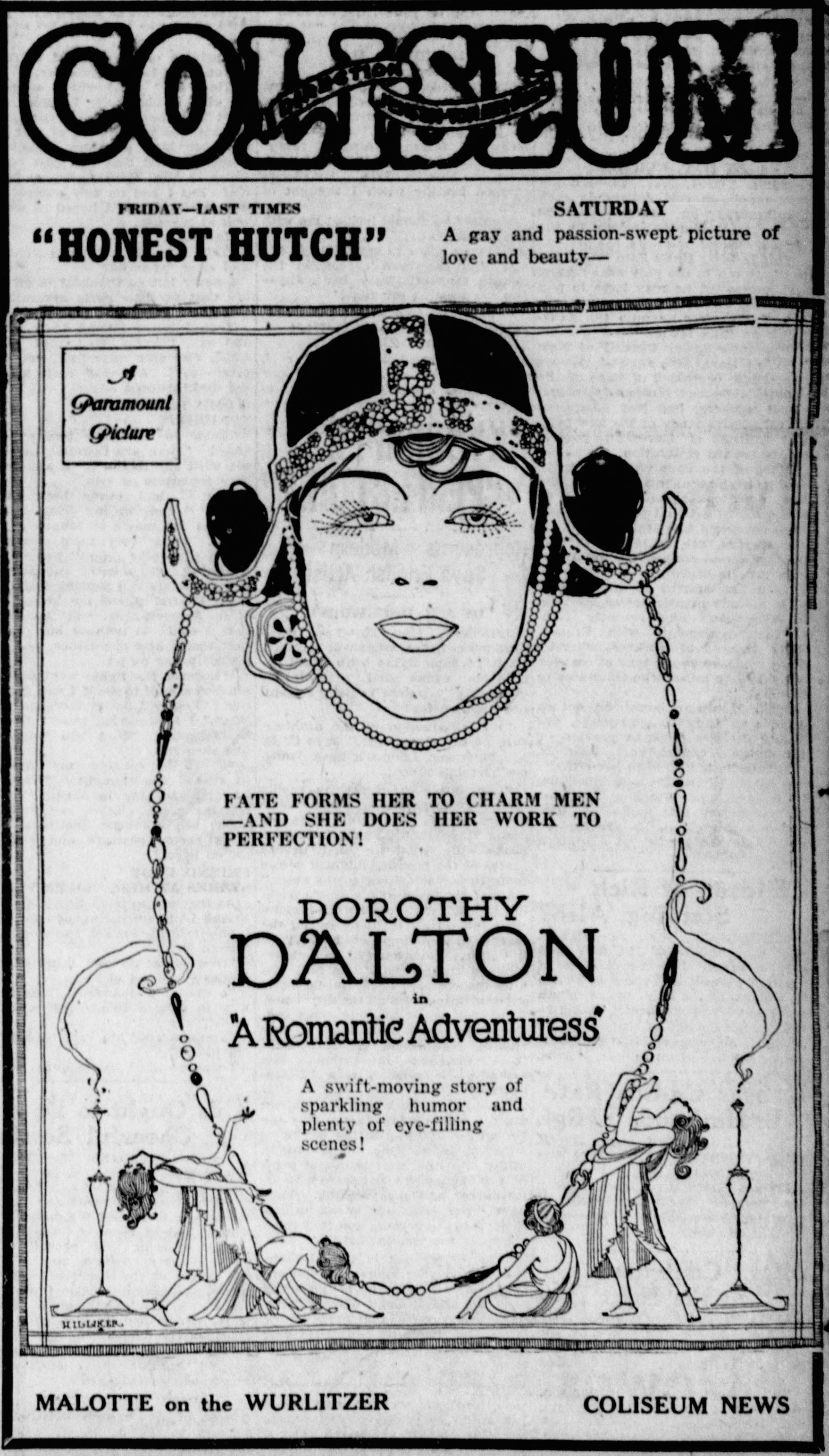
- Contemporary advertisement
- Directed by: Harley Knoles
- Screenplay by: Rosina Henley
- Story by: Charles Belmont Davis
- Produced by: Adolph Zukor
- Starring: Dorothy Dalton; Charles Meredith; Howard Lang; Augusta Anderson; Ivo Dawson
- Cinematography: Philip Hatkin
- Production company: Famous Players–Lasky Corporation
- Distributed by: Paramount Pictures
- Release date: November 1920
- Running time: 50 minutes
- Country: United States
- Language: Silent (English intertitles)

A Romantic Adventuress is a 1920 American silent drama film directed by Harley Knoles and adapted by Rosina Henley from the story A Winter City Favorite by Charles Belmont Davis. The film stars Dorothy Dalton, Charles Meredith, Howard Lang, Augusta Anderson, and Ivo Dawson. The film was released in November 1920, by Paramount Pictures.

== Plot ==
As described in a film magazine, Alice Vanni, daughter of dancing master Professor Vanni and prima donna Mrs. Martyn, who abandoned her husband during the child's babyhood to go her selfish way, is sent after the death of her father to stay with her mother whom she has not known. With the aid of her cohort Louis Fitch, the mother plans a wealthy marriage for the young woman in ambition of repairing her own fortunes. To further this plan the trio go abroad. In a watering place in Europe, Alice meets Captain Maxwell of the prior year's Yale football team, whom she first saw in a brilliant play during the Yale-Harvard game. She gives her heart to him, but her mother insists she accept the advances of the Italian Signor Castelli. The latter is later proved to be a married man and the clever mother and Fitch blackmail him for several thousand dollars. Alice eventually defies her mother and accepts the love the Yale man offers her regardless of his lack of wealth.

== Cast ==
- Dorothy Dalton as Alice Vanni
- Charles Meredith as Captain Maxwell
- Howard Lang as Professor Vanni
- Augusta Anderson as Mrs. Martyn
- Ivo Dawson as Louis Fitch
- John Ardizoni as Signor Castelli
- Howard Lang as James Cortright
- Evan Burroughs Fontaine as Dancer
- Robert Schable as Charles Robertson
