= Bought and Paid For (1916 film) =

1916 silent film

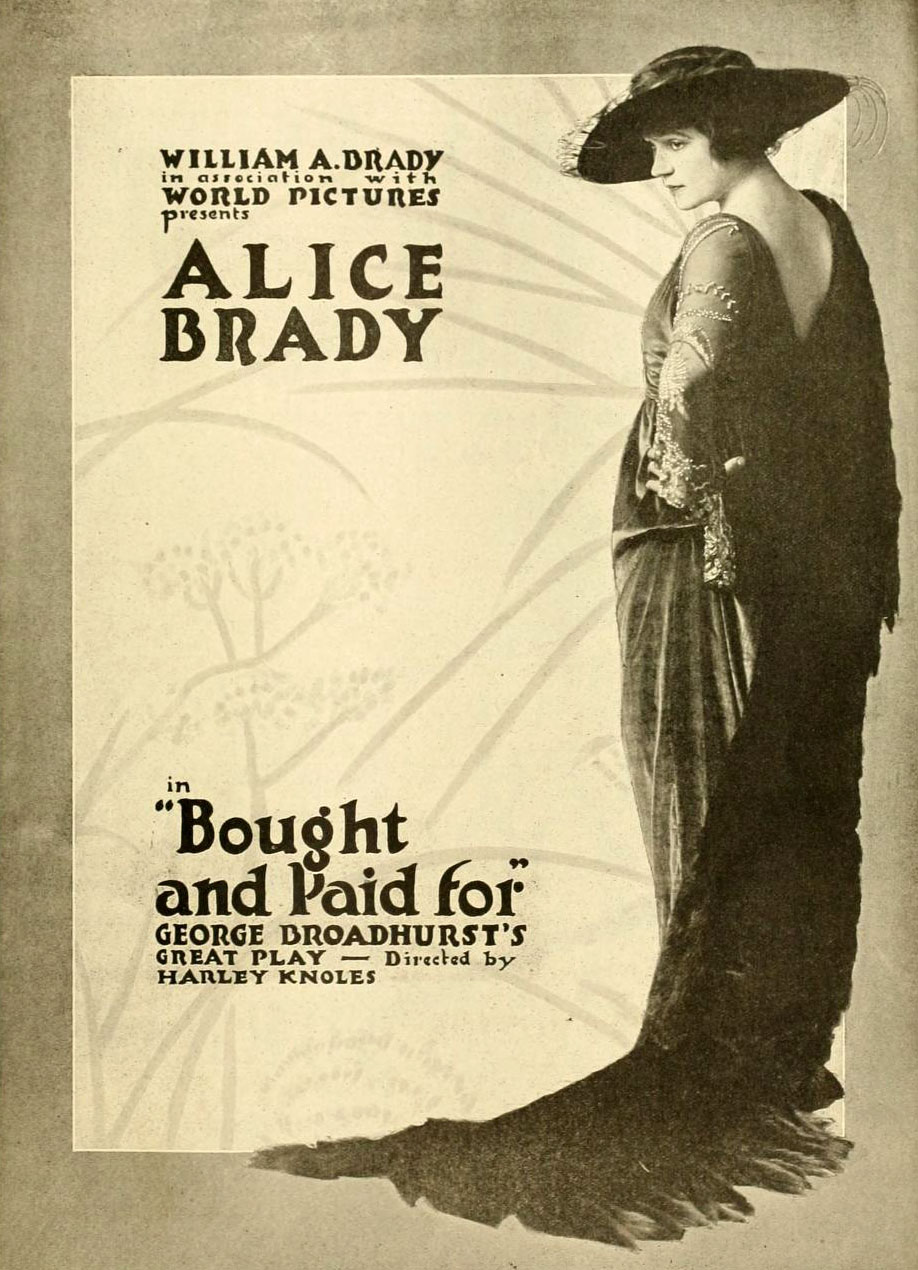
- Directed by: Harley Knoles
- Written by: George Broadhurst (play); Frances Marion
- Produced by: William A. Brady
- Starring: Alice Brady; Josephine Drake; Montagu Love
- Cinematography: Arthur Edeson
- Production company: William A. Brady Picture Plays
- Distributed by: World Film
- Release date: November 8, 1916
- Running time: 50 minutes
- Country: United States
- Languages: Silent; English intertitles

Bought and Paid For is a 1916 American silent drama film directed by Harley Knoles and starring Alice Brady, Josephine Drake and Montagu Love.

== Cast ==
- Alice Brady as Vivian Blaine
- Josephine Drake as Fanny Blaine
- Frank Conlan as Jimmy Gilly
- Montagu Love as Robert Stafford
- Makoto Inokuchi (role unknown)

== Bibliography ==
- Goble, Alan. The Complete Index to Literary Sources in Film. Walter de Gruyter, 1999.
