= The Bohemian Girl (1922 film) =

1922 British film by Harley Knoles

- Advertisement in Motion Picture News
- Flor da Boémia
- Directed by: Harley Knoles; Josef von Sternberg
- Screenplay by: Rosina Henley; Harley Knoles
- Based on: The Bohemian Girl by Michael William Balfe
- Produced by: Harley Knoles
- Starring: Gladys Cooper; Ivor Novello; C. Aubrey Smith
- Cinematography: René Guissart
- Production company: Alliance Film Corporation
- Distributed by: Astra Film; American Releasing Corporation (US)
- Release date: July 1922
- Running time: (8 reels)
- Country: United Kingdom
- Language: Silent (English intertitles)
- Box office: $400,000

The Bohemian Girl is a 1922 British romance film directed by Harley Knoles and starring Gladys Cooper, Ivor Novello, and C. Aubrey Smith. It was inspired by the opera The Bohemian Girl by Michael William Balfe and Alfred Bunn, which was in turn based on a novel La Gitanilla by Miguel de Cervantes. Originally released at 70 minutes, the surviving print is missing the first two reels and small portion of the last, timing at 46 minutes.

== Plot ==
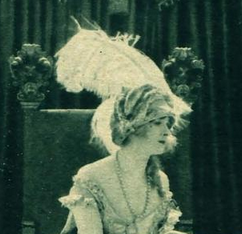
Gladys Cooper as Arline in The Bohemian Girl

Arline is the little daughter of Count Arnheim, governor of an Austrian province who lives in feudal splendor near a forest where a Gypsy Queen and her tribe encamp, with her lieutenant, Devilshoof. He comes by chance upon Thaddeus, a young Polish refugee pursued by Austrian soldiers. Devilshoof protects the youth and offers him the concealment of gypsy garb. Arline escapes from the castle and is saved from a bear by Thaddeus, who with Devilshoof returns her to her father. It is in the midst of a banquet, that Thaddeus, a Pole, refuses to drink a toast to the Austrian emperor. Thaddeus is ejected in disgrace and Devilshoof vows to be revenged. He returns and, when the chance comes, carries Arline away. Twelve years of wandering finds Thaddeus part of the gypsy caravan and Arline grown to beautiful womanhood. Their love is discovered by the Gypsy Queen and because of her desire to wed Thaddeus she swears to accomplish the downfall of Arline. Count Florestein, a friend of Arline's father, is robbed of a medallion by the gypsies, who yield it to their Queen. This jewel the Queen gives to Arline when the girl sets out for a fair where she tells fortunes. Among her patrons is Florestein, who recognizes his medallion and orders the arrest of Arline. She is taken to the castle for trial, where, her own father is her judge. Count Arnheim is moved to gentleness he cannot understand and when the gypsy girl tells him her name he tremblingly summons the old nurse, who instantly recognizes her lost darling.

Exhibitors Herald (1923)

== Cast ==
- Gladys Cooper as Arline Arnheim
- Ivor Novello as Thaddeus
- C. Aubrey Smith as Devilshoof
- Ellen Terry as Buda, the Nurse
- Constance Collier as Queen
- Henry Vibart as Count Arnheim
- Gibb McLaughlin as Captain Florenstein
