= The Devil's Toy =

1916 silent film

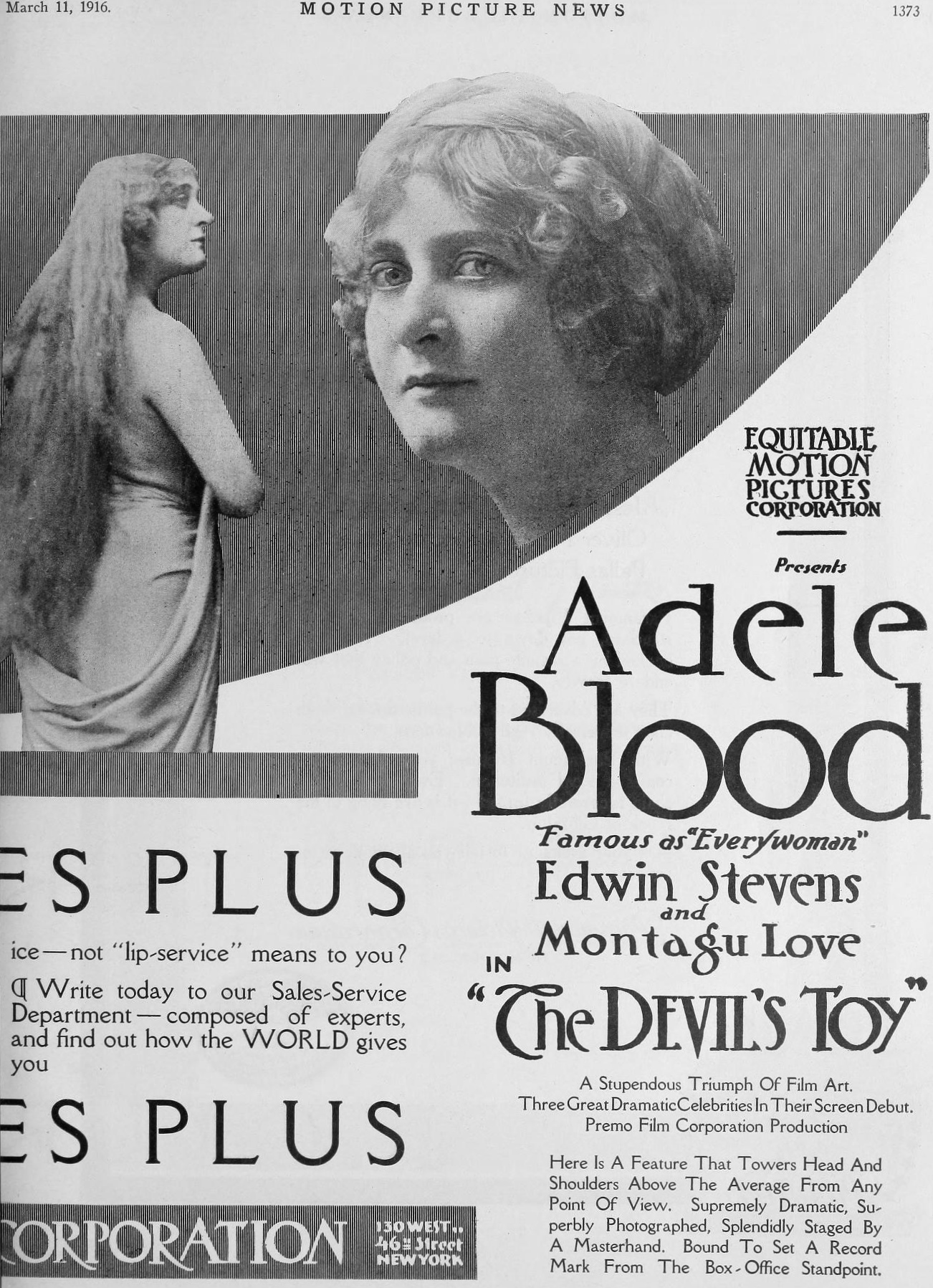
- Directed by: Harley Knoles
- Written by: Edward Madden; Maurice E. Marks
- Starring: [Adele Blood]] Edwin Stevens; Montagu Love
- Cinematography: Arthur Edeson
- Production company: Premo Film Company
- Distributed by: World Film
- Release date: March 6, 1916
- Running time: 50 minutes
- Country: United States
- Languages: Silent; English intertitles

The Devil's Toy is a 1916 American silent drama film directed by Harley Knoles and starring Adele Blood, Edwin Stevens and Montagu Love.

== Cast ==
- Adele Blood as Helen Danvier
- Edwin Stevens as The Devil
- Montagu Love as Wilfred Barsley
- John Halliday as Paul La France
- Madge Evans as Betty
- Arnold Lucy as Simon Cunningale

== Bibliography ==
- Langman, Larry. American Film Cycles: The Silent Era. Greenwood Publishing, 1998.
