= Heartbreak (1931 film) =

1931 film

- Film poster
- Directed by: Alfred L. Werker
- Written by: William M. Conselman
- Produced by: William Goetz
- Starring: Charles Farrell; Madge Evans; Paul Cavanagh
- Cinematography: Joseph H. August
- Edited by: Margaret Clancey
- Music by: George Lipschultz; Hugo Friedhofer
- Production company: Fox Film Corporation
- Distributed by: Fox Film Corporation
- Release date: November 8, 1931
- Running time: 63 minutes
- Country: United States
- Language: English

Heartbreak (also known as Love and War) is a 1931 American pre-Code war drama film directed by Alfred L. Werker and starring Charles Farrell, Madge Evans and Paul Cavanagh.

== Plot ==
In the years before the United States' involvement in World War I, John Merrick and Jerry Somers, attachés to the American embassy in Vienna, attend an elaborate fundraiser at the aristocratic Walden home, where John meets the countess Vilma Walden and romance blooms.

Vilma's twin brother, combat veteran Count Carl Walden, along with Vilma and Carl's father, asks John when Americans will fight against Austria. Kapitan Wolke, a family friend, emerges as a rival for the affections of Vilma. A heated confrontation takes place between John and Wolke.

When the United States goes to war, John requests a post at the Italian front where Carl is stationed. John returns to the Walden home and breaks the news to Vilma, who promises to return to the pool by the house each day until John's reflection appears beside her own.

After duty in France, John is transferred to the Italian front where he faces an enemy squadron led by Wolke and his ace pilot Carl. In the air over the Italian Alps, John spots Wolke's aircraft and downs it, landing nearby to try to rescue the pilot. John is astonished to discover that the pilot is actually Carl, who had borrowed Wolke's aircraft for the mission.

John is overcome with grief and announces that he wishes to kill no more. After refusing to join his squadron on a flight against the enemy, John steals an aircraft and flies to the Walden house behind enemy lines. He confesses to Vilma that he killed Carl and begs her forgiveness, but she refuses.

For his desertion, John is court-martialed with Jerry, his defense attorney, unsuccessfully defending him. Despondent and apathetic, he is found guilty and receives a dishonorable discharge and a sentence of hard labor.

Peace finally comes and John visits the Walden estate, which is now a home for war orphans. As Vilma sits by the pool, she sees John's reflection beside hers, and they embrace.

== Cast ==
- Charles Farrell as John Merrick
- Madge Evans as Countess Vima Walden
- Paul Cavanagh as Kapitan Wolke
- Hardie Albright as Count Carl Walden
- John Arledge as Jerry Sommers
- Claude King as Count Walden
- John St. Polis as U.S. Ambassador
- Albert Conti as Liaison Officer
- Theodore von Eltz as Military Prosecutor
- Wilson Benge as Butler (uncredited)

== Production ==
In August 1931, Fox rented the modified Nieuport 28s for use in the film, and a Travel Air 4000 was also leased. A Royal Aircraft Factory S.E.5 with German markings also appears as Wolke's aircraft. Garland Lincoln and Frank Clarke performed the flying maneuvers in the aerial battles over the San Gabriel Mountains east of the Los Angeles Basin. (Note: The recreated British base at the Triunfo airfield, near Thousand Oaks, California was used as a setting for many aviation films, including Heartbreak.)

The film is set primarily in Italy but was filmed in California, with the San Gabriel Mountains taking the place of the Italian Alps.

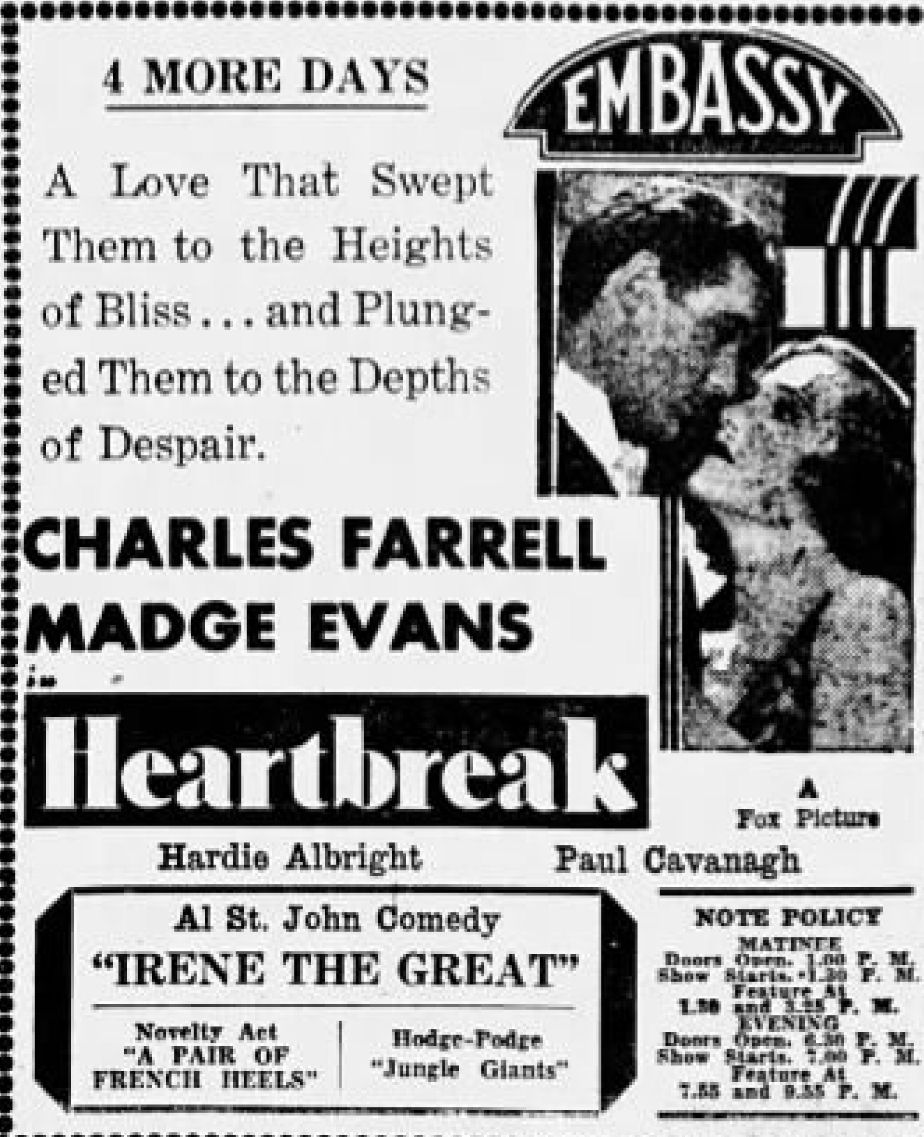
Newspaper advertisement for Heartbreak

== Reception ==
In a contemporary review for The New York Times, critic Mordaunt Hall wrote: "It is a mildly entertaining affair, with some excellent flying scenes that are presumed to be in the Italian Alps."
