= Madge Evans =

American actress (1909–1981)

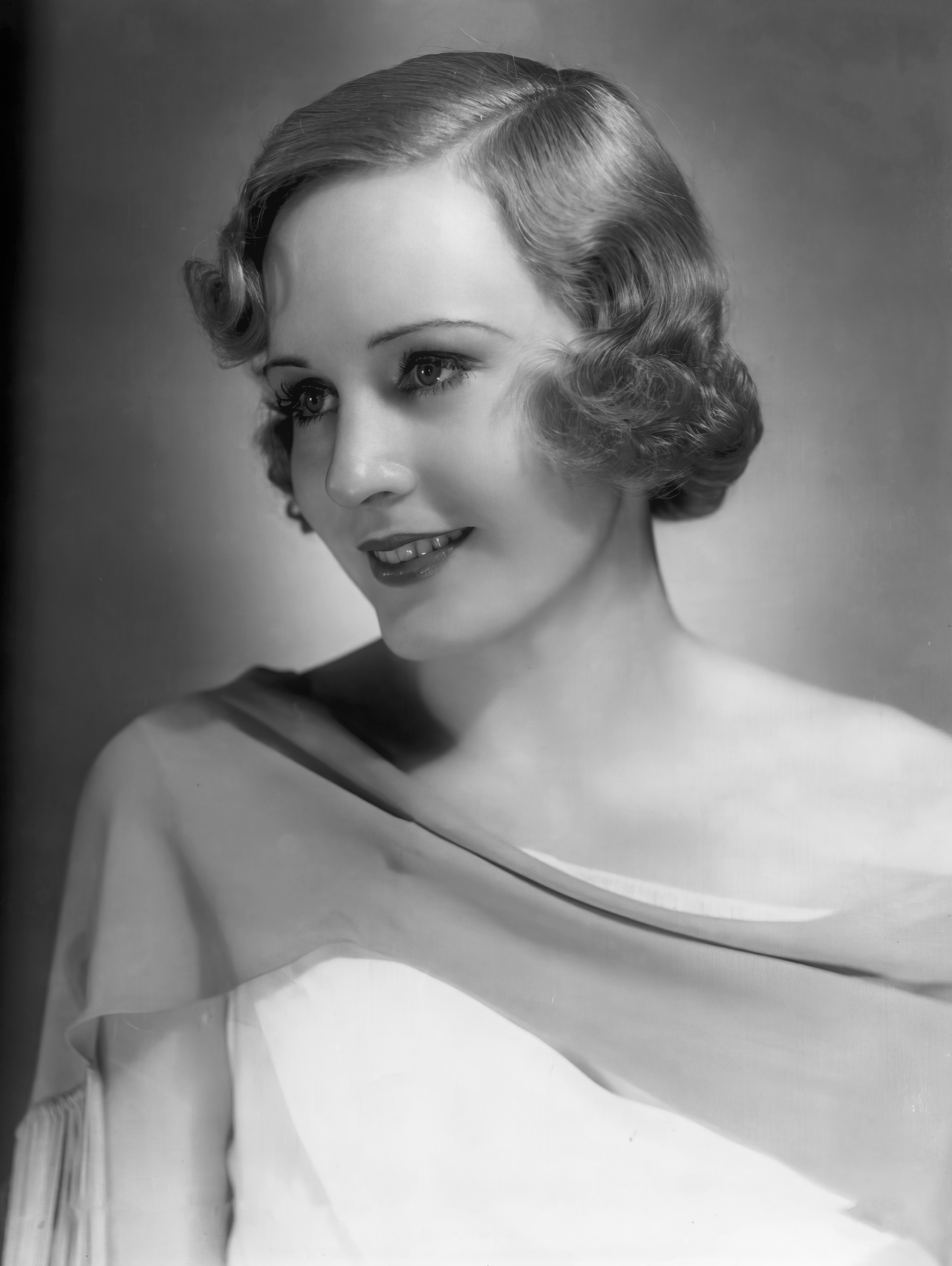
- Evans in Broadway to Hollywood (1933)
- Born: Margherita Harrison Evans; July 1, 1909; New York City, U.S.
- Died: April 26, 1981 (aged 71); Oakland, New Jersey, U.S.
- Occupation: Actress
- Years active: 1914–1958
- Spouse: Sidney Kingsley (m. 1939)
- Awards: Star on Hollywood Walk of Fame

Madge Evans (born Margherita Harrison Evans; July 1, 1909 – April 26, 1981) was an American stage, film, radio, and television actress. She began her career as a child performer and model.

== Biography ==
=== Child model and stage actress ===
Evans was born in Manhattan, and featured in print ads as the "Fairy Soap girl" when she was two years old. She made her professional debut at the age of six months, posing as an artist's model. As a youth, her playmates included Robert Warwick, Holbrook Blinn, and Henry Hull. When she was four years old, Evans was featured in a series of child plays produced by William A. Brady. She worked at the old movie studio in Long Island, New York. Her success was immediate, so much so that her mother lent her daughter's name to a hat company. Evans posed in a mother-and-child tableau with Anita Stewart, then 16, for an Anheuser-Busch Brewing Company calendar, and as the little mountain girl in Heidi of the Alps.

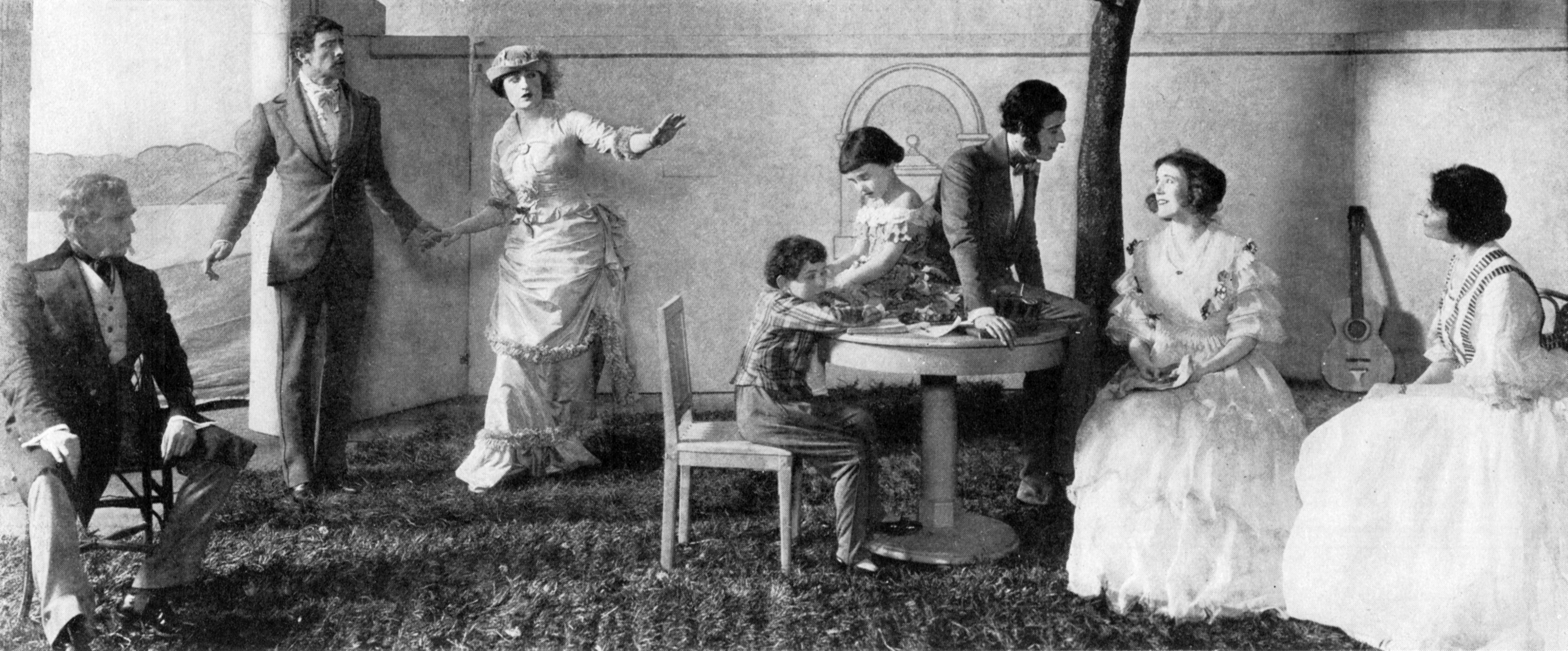
A very young Evans (girl sitting on table at center) in the Broadway production Peter Ibbetson (1917)

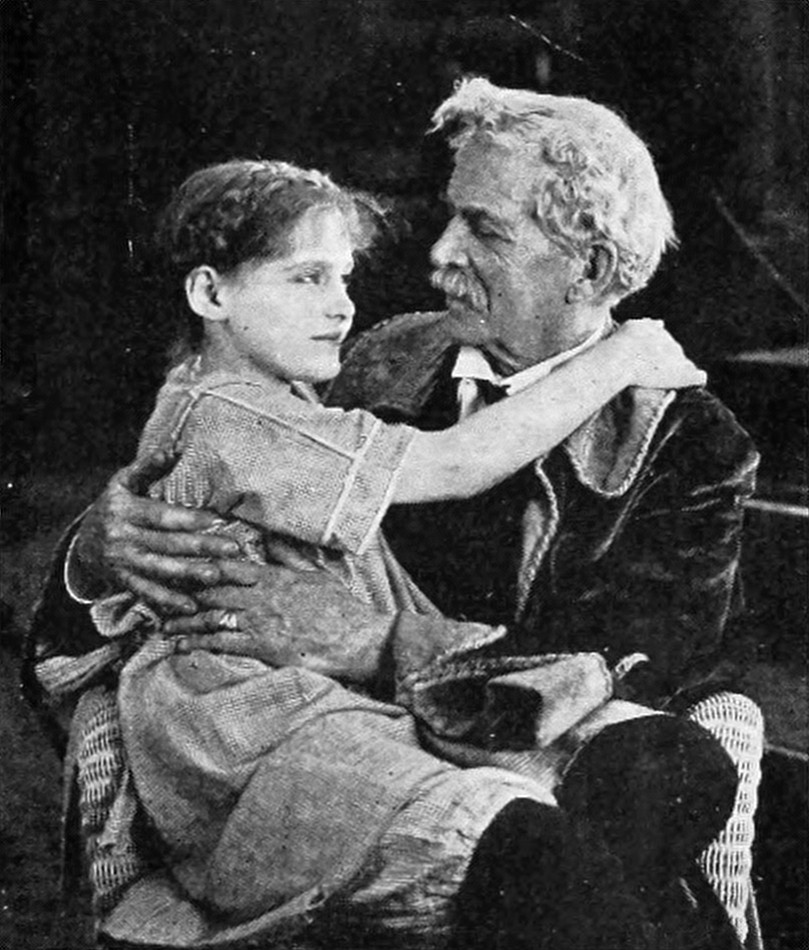
Evans with actor William T. Carleton in Home Wanted (1919)

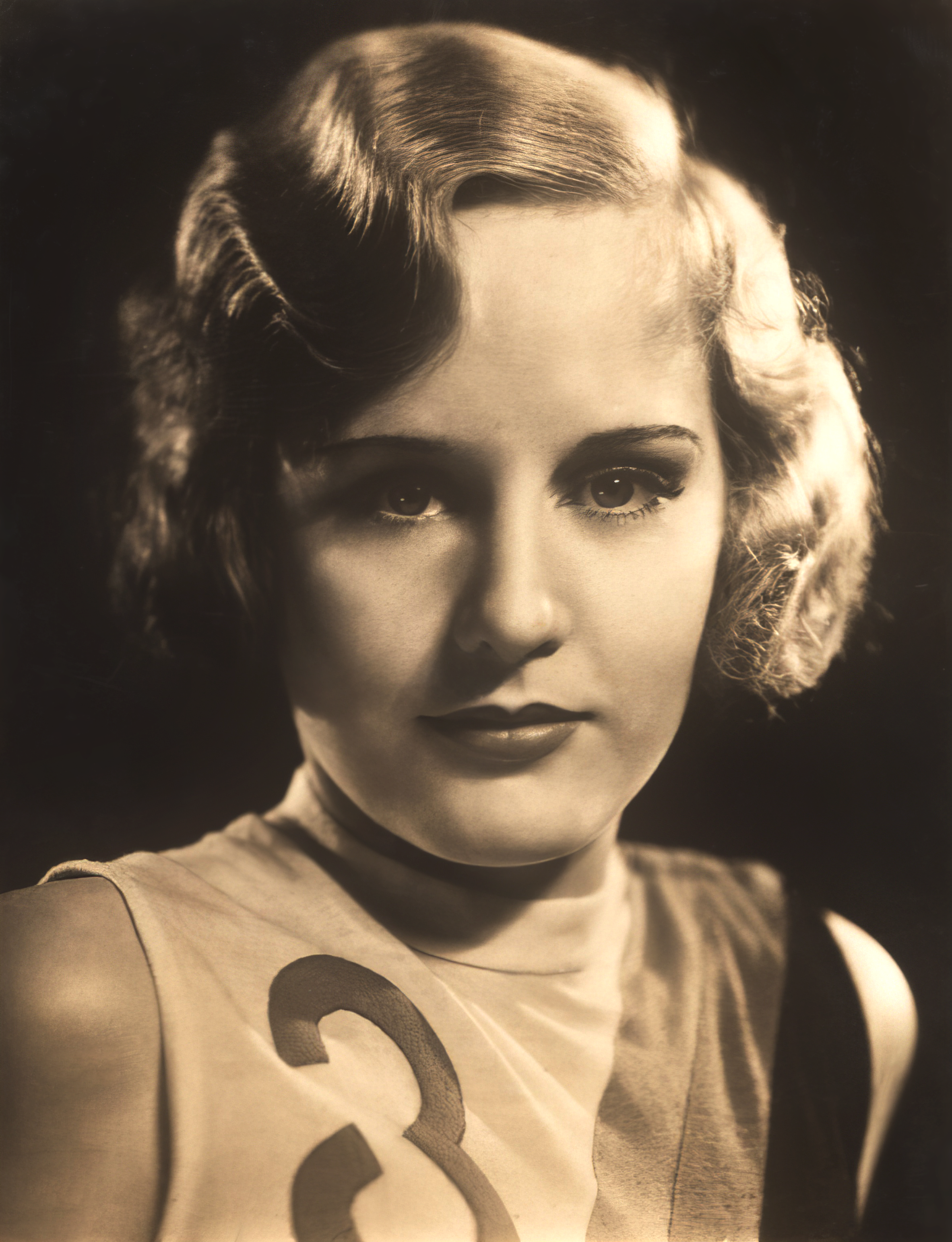
Evans, c. 1932

At the age of eight in 1917, Evans appeared in the Broadway production of Peter Ibbetson with John Barrymore, Constance Collier, and Laura Hope Crews. At 17, she returned to the stage and appeared as the ingenue in Daisy Mayme. Some of her better work in plays came in productions of Dread, The Marquis, and The Conquering Male. Her last appearance was in Philip Goes Forth produced by George Kelley. Evans' mother took her to England and Europe when she was 15.

=== Film career ===
As a child, Evans debuted in The Sign of the Cross (1914). She appeared in dozens of films, including with Marguerite Clark in The Seven Sisters (1915). She was featured with Robert Warwick in Alias Jimmy Valentine (1915). At 14, she was the star of J. Stuart Blackton's rural melodrama On the Banks of the Wabash (1923). She co-starred with Richard Barthelmess in Classmates (1924).

She was working on stage when she signed with Metro Goldwyn Mayer (MGM) in 1927. As with theater, she continued to play ingenue parts, often as the fiancé of the leading man. She played the love interest to both Al Jolson and Frank Morgan in the 1933 film Hallelujah, I'm a Bum.

Working for MGM in the 1930s, she appeared in Dinner at Eight (1933), Broadway to Hollywood (1933), Hell Below (1933), and David Copperfield (1935). In 1933, she starred with James Cagney in the melodrama The Mayor of Hell. Other notable movies in which she appeared are Beauty for Sale (1933), Grand Canary (1934), What Every Woman Knows (1934), and Pennies From Heaven (1936).

In 1960, for Evans' contribution to the motion-picture industry, she was honored with a star on the Hollywood Walk of Fame located at 1752 Vine Street.

=== Radio and television ===
Later, Evans worked in radio and television in New York City. She performed on The Philco Television Playhouse (1949–1950), Studio One (1954), Matinee Theater (1955), and The Alcoa Hour (1956). She was also a panelist on the 1950s version of Masquerade Party.

=== Personal life ===
Evans married playwright Sidney Kingsley, best known for his plays Dead End and Detective Story, in York Village, Maine, on July 25, 1939. The couple owned a 250-acre (1,000,000 m^{2}) estate in Oakland, New Jersey. Following her marriage to Kingsley, Evans left Hollywood and moved to this home in New Jersey.

=== Death ===
Evans died at her home in Oakland, New Jersey, from cancer in 1981, aged 71.

== Filmography ==
=== Film ===
Year	Film	Role	Notes
1914	Shore Acres	Mildred	
1915	Alias Jimmy Valentine	Child locked in vault	Uncredited
1915	The Seven Sisters	Clara	Lost film
1915	The Master Hand	Jean as a child	Lost film
1915	Zaza	Child	Uncredited; Lost film
1915	The Little Church Around the Corner	Child	
1916	The Devil's Toy	Betty	
1916	Sudden Riches	Little Emily	
1916	Husband and Wife	Bessie	
1916	The Revolt	Nannie Stevens	
1916	The Hidden Scar	Dot	Incomplete film
1916	Seventeen	Jane Baxter	Lost film
1916	The New South	Georgia Gwynne as a child	
1917	The Web of Desire	Marjorie	Lost film
1917	Maternity	Constance	
1917	The Beloved Adventuress	Francine at age 7	Lost film
1917	The Volunteer	Herself	
1917	The Little Duchess	Geraldine Carmichael	
1917	The Burglar	Editha	
1917	The Corner Grocer	Mary Brian at age 8	
1917	Adventures of Carol	Carol Montgomery	
1917	The Little Patriot	Undetermined role	Uncredited
1918	Woman and Wife		Uncredited; Incomplete film
1918	The Gates of Gladness	Beth Leeds	
1918	Wanted: A Mother	Eileen Homer	
1918	True Blue	Girl child	Uncredited
1918	Vengeance	Young Nan as a girl	
1918	Stolen Orders	Ruth Le Page as a child	Lost film
1918	The Golden Wall	Madge Lathroop	
1918	Neighbors	Clarissa Leigh	
1918	Heredity	Nedda Trevor as a child	
1918	The Power and the Glory	Deanie Consadine	
1918	The Love Net	Patty Barnes	
1919	The Love Defender	Dolly Meredith	
1919	Three Green Eyes	Child	
1919	Home Wanted	Madge Dow	
1920	Heidi	Heidi	
1923	On the Banks of the Wabash	Lisbeth	
1924	Classmates	Sylvia	Lost film
1930	Envy	Helen	Short film
1931	Son of India	Janice Darsey	First film for MGM
1931	Sporting Blood	Miss 'Missy' Ruby	
1931	Guilty Hands	Barbara 'Babs' Grant	
1931	Heartbreak	Countess Vima Walden	
1931	West of Broadway	Anne	
1932	Lovers Courageous	Mary Blayne	
1932	The Greeks Had a Word for Them	Polaire	
1932	Are You Listening?	Laura O'Neil	
1932	Huddle	Rosalie Stone	
1932	Fast Life	Shirley	
1933	Hallelujah, I'm a Bum	June Marcher	
1933	Hell Below	Joan Standish	
1933	Made on Broadway	Claire Bidwell	
1933	The Nuisance	Dorothy Mason	
1933	The Mayor of Hell	Dorothy Griffith	
1933	Dinner at Eight	Paula Jordan	
1933	Broadway to Hollywood	Anne Ainsley	
1933	Beauty for Sale	Letty Lawson	
1933	Day of Reckoning	Dorothy Day	
1934	Fugitive Lovers	Letty Morris	
1934	The Show-Off	Amy Fisher Piper	
1934	Stand Up and Cheer!	Mary Adams	
1934	Grand Canary	Lady Mary Fielding	
1934	Paris Interlude	Julia 'Julie' Bell	
1934	Death on the Diamond	Frances Clark	
1934	What Every Woman Knows	Lady Sybil Tenterden	
1935	Helldorado	Glenda Wynant	
1935	David Copperfield	Agnes Wickfield	
1935	Age of Indiscretion	Maxine Bennett	
1935	Calm Yourself	Rosalind Rockwell	
1935	Men Without Names	Helen Sherwood	
1935	The Tunnel	Ruth McAllan	
1936	Exclusive Story	Ann Devlin	
1936	Moonlight Murder	Antonia 'Toni' Adams	
1936	Piccadilly Jim	Ann Chester	
1936	Pennies from Heaven	Susan Sprague	
1937	Espionage	Patricia Booth	
1937	The Thirteenth Chair	Nell O'Neill	
1938	Sinners in Paradise	Anne Wesson	
1938	Army Girl	Julie Armstrong	

=== Television ===
Year	Title	Role	Episode
1949-50	The Philco Television Playhouse	Elinor Dashwood / Elizabeth Bennet	Pride and Prejudice, Sense and Sensibility
1951	Pulitzer Prize Playhouse	The niece	Alison's House
1951	Cameo Theatre		Deception
1952	Mrs. Thanksgiving		TV movie
1953	Lux Video Theatre	Sylvia	This is Jimmy Merrill
1953	Armstrong Circle Theatre	Mrs. Douglass	Judgement
1953	Medallion Theatre		The Trouble Train
1953	The Motorola Television Hour		At Ease
1954	Justice		The Desperate One
1954	Studio One	Ann	Fear Is No Stranger, The Magic Monday
1955	Matinee Theatre		Coming of Age
1956	The Alcoa Hour	Agnes Spencer	The Girl in Chapter One
1958	The Investigator		Season 1 Episode 6

== Bibliography ==
- Los Angeles Times, Marriages In Hollywood Exceed Divorces In 1939, January 2, 1940, Page A1.
- Los Angeles Times, Child Film Star, Ingenue Madge Evans Dies at 71, April 27, 1981, Page A1.
- Oakland, California Tribune, Two Wise Young Maidens, January 10, 1937, Page 80.
- San Mateo Times, A Defence of Youth, January 18, 1936, Page 15.
- Syracuse Herald, Madge Evans, Joan Marsh, and Jackie Coogan head Sextet Surviving, Sunday Morning, July 19, 1931, Section 3, Page 11.
- Zanesville, Ohio Signal, Madge Evans Has Role With James Cagney, July 16, 1933, Page 12.
