= A Soul Without Windows =

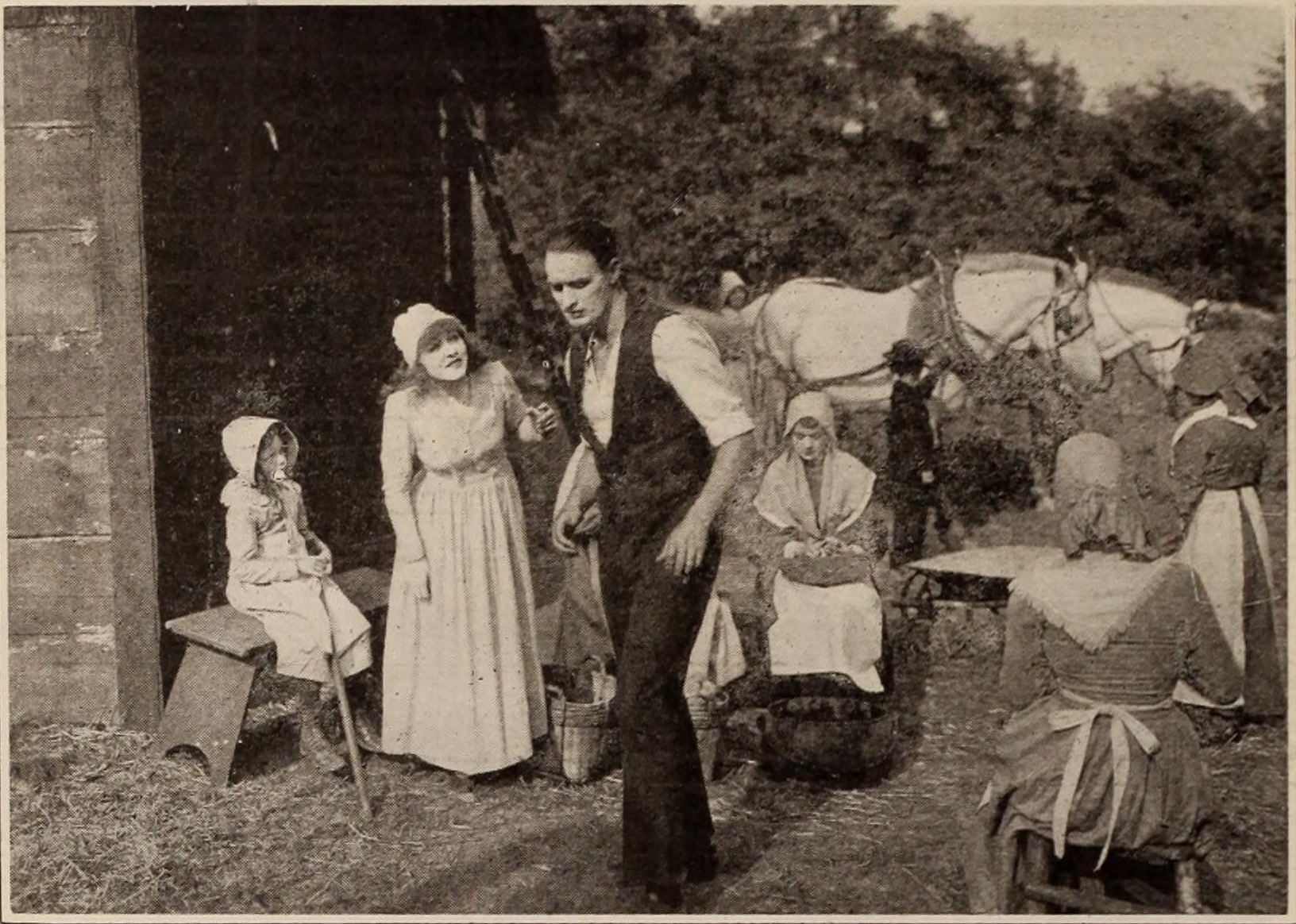
- Ethel Clayton in a scene from the film
- Directed by: Travers Vale
- Written by: Julia Burnham
- Starring: Ethel Clayton
- Cinematography: Max Schneider
- Production company: World Film
- Distributed by: World Film
- Release date: September 30, 1918 (USA)
- Running time: 5 reels
- Country: USA
- Language: Silent (English Intertitles)

A Soul Without Windows is a 1918 American silent feature film drama directed by Travers Vale and starring Ethel Clayton. The film was produced and distributed by World Film Company.

== Plot ==
As described in a film trade publication, Hopama, the child of an unknown woman, has been brought up in a settlement of Shakers. Her life is by no means an easy one for any indulgences of the ordinary mortal are looked upon as sins by this group of ultra-religious persons. One day a traveling musician, Camillio, comes through the town with his small troupe of talent. He plays his violin before Hopama and the other village children, and when he is finished the girl seizes the instrument and plays the identical tune over again. Astounded. Camillio invites her to take lessons with him at any time.

Scott Mallory, a wealthy young man whose country residence is near the Shaker settlement, is engaged to Faith Palmer. One day while Faith is swimming she is seized with a cramp. Scott dashes in to rescue her and while he saves her life he also is taken by a cramp, from which he does not recover. The country doctor believes that he will remain paralyzed the rest of his life. In despair Scott breaks his engagement with Faith, realizing that she does not really love him.

When Mrs. Mallory visits the Shaker town she meets Hopama and invites her to her home. Eager to escape the severity of her environment, she accepts the invitation. It is she who restores to Scott his faith in the world. Later he is cured by a famous physician. Mrs. Mallory, not wishing her son to marry an unknown girl, tells Hopama that Scott is still engaged to Faith. Unable to stand this, Hopama runs away and goes to Camillio. She blossoms forth as a violin soloist at a concert.

It is in this way that Scott discovers her whereabouts. And the matter of her parents is cleared up, for it is proven she is the descendant of a good family, close friends of the Mallorys.

== Cast ==
- Ethel Clayton as Ho-Pama
- Richard Clarke as Joshua
- Eugenie Woodward as Hannah
- Victor Kennard as Nehemiah
- David Davies as Pedro Camillio
- Gus Pixley as Murio
- Zadee Burbank as Mrs. Mallory
- Frank Mayo as Scott Mallory
- Pinna Nesbit as Faith Palmer
- Jack Drumier as Mr. Palmer
- Jack Roberts as Griswold
- Sadie Schaeffer as Woman
- Violet Askel as Girl

== Reception ==
Variety's review was very positive, and described it as "excellent" and "good picture entertainment." Moving Picture World reviewer Robert C. McElravy was also positive and recommended it as "a thoroughly enjoyable offering." Wid's Daily was more mixed, and found the story and comedy to be lacking and stated that the film was "very ordinary."
