= Guilty of Love (film) =

1920 film by Harley Knoles

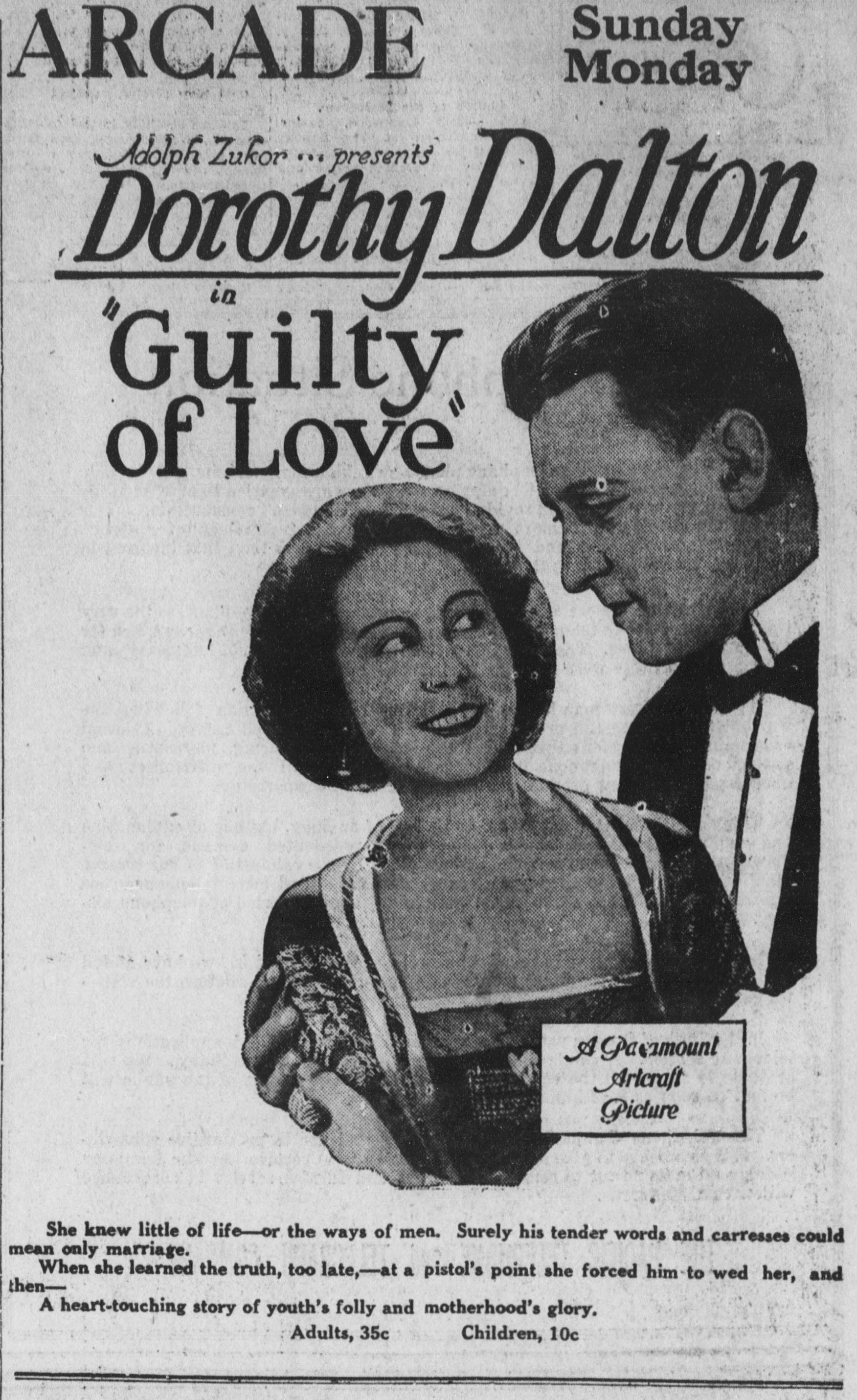
- Contemporary advertisement
- Directed by: Harley Knoles
- Screenplay by: Rosina Henley
- Based on: This Woman — This Man by Avery Hopwood
- Produced by: Adolph Zukor
- Starring: Dorothy Dalton; Julia Hurley; Henry Carvill
- Cinematography: Philip Hatkin
- Production company: Famous Players–Lasky Corporation
- Distributed by: Paramount Pictures
- Release date: August 22, 1920
- Running time: 50 minutes
- Country: United States
- Language: Silent (English intertitles)

Guilty of Love is a 1920 American silent drama film directed by Harley Knoles and written by Rosina Henley who adapted the play by Avery Hopwood. The film stars Dorothy Dalton, Julia Hurley, Henry Carvill, Augusta Anderson, Edward Langford, and Charles Lane. The film was released on August 22, 1920, by Paramount Pictures.

== Plot ==
As described in a film magazine, Thelma Miller becomes the governess in the Florida home of Goddard Townsend and is met, loved, betrayed, and deserted by Norris Townsend, the uncle of the children. Learning that there is to be a child, Norris expects to marry Thelma, but the interference of his father and sister persuade him to approach Thelma with an offer to buy her off. She forces the marriage at the point of a gun and then leaves Florida. Five years later the repentant Norris ends a five-year search when he finds the mother and child in a western town. For the sake of her son Thelma agrees to return to the Florida home, but only as the mother of the child. After a near accident involves the son, Thelma and Norris are reunited in the tenderness of their first love.

== Cast ==
- Dorothy Dalton as Thelma Miller
- Julia Hurley as Aunt Martha
- Henry Carvill as Dr. Wentworth
- Augusta Anderson as Mrs. Watkins
- Edward Langford as Norris Townsend
- Charles Lane as Goddard Townsend
- Douglas Redmond as David
- Ivy Ward as Mary
- Lawrence Johnson as Bob

== Preservation ==
With no copies located in any film archives, Guilty of Love is a lost film.
