= Lure of Ambition =

1919 silent film by Edmund Lawrence

The Lure of Ambition
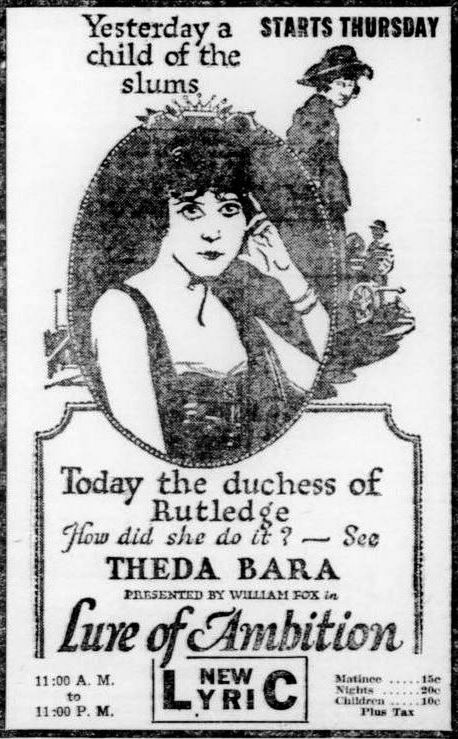
- Newspaper ad for Lure of Ambition
- Directed by: Edmund Lawrence
- Written by: Julia Burnham; Edmund Lawrence
- Produced by: William Fox
- Starring: Theda Bara; Thurlow Bergen; William B. Davidson; Dan Mason
- Cinematography: H. Alderson Leach
- Distributed by: Fox Film Corporation
- Release date: November 1919
- Running time: 50 minutes (5 reels)
- Country: United States
- Languages: Silent film English intertitles

Lure of Ambition is a 1919 American silent drama film directed by Edmund Lawrence, and starring Theda Bara.

The film was considered to be lost, until February 27, 2019 when a fragment running 43 seconds was rediscovered.

== Plot ==
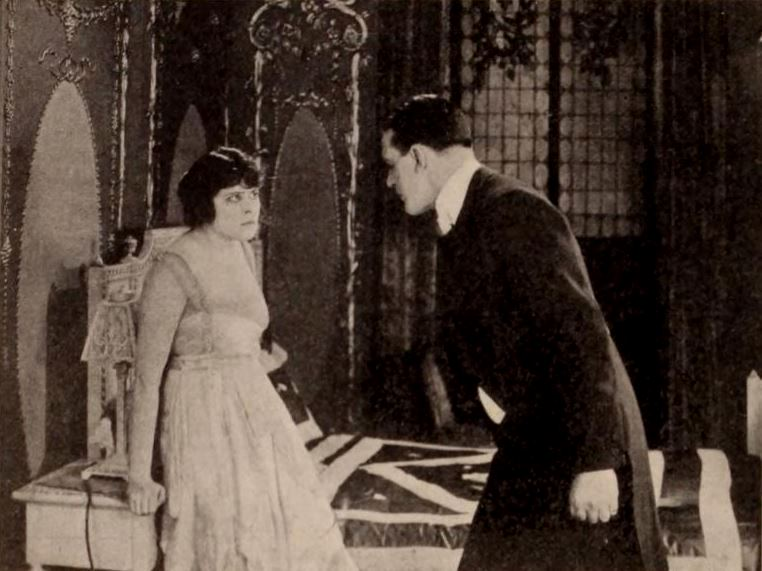
Theda Bara as Olga Dolan in Lure of Ambition.

Olga Dolan is a poor young woman working as a public stenographer at a hotel in New York. She allures Cyril Ralston, a nobleman, and starts to have a romantic relationship with him. Ralston promises Olga that they will get married soon. However, he returns to England leaving Olga. After being deceived by Ralston, Olga vows revenge. She goes to England and begins working as a secretary to Lady Constance Bromley. Later, Olga finds out that Ralston is Bromley's son and that he is a married man. Although Ralston still pursues her, Olga becomes interested in another nobleman, Duke of Ruthledge, and eventually becomes his private secretary impressing him. After the Duke's wife died due to heart attack caused by jealousy, there is no obstacle for Olga to marry the duke.

== Cast ==
Actor name	Character's name
Theda Bara	Olga Dolan
Thurlow Bergen	Duke of Rutledge
William B. Davidson	Cyril Ralston
Dan Mason	Sylvester Dolan
Ida Waterman	Duchess
Amelia Gardner	Lady Constance Bromley
Robert Paton Gibbs	Miguel Lopez
Dorothy Drake	Muriel Ralston
Peggy Parr	Minna Dolan
Tammany Young	Dan Hicks
