= Bolshevism on Trial =

1919 film by Harley Knoles

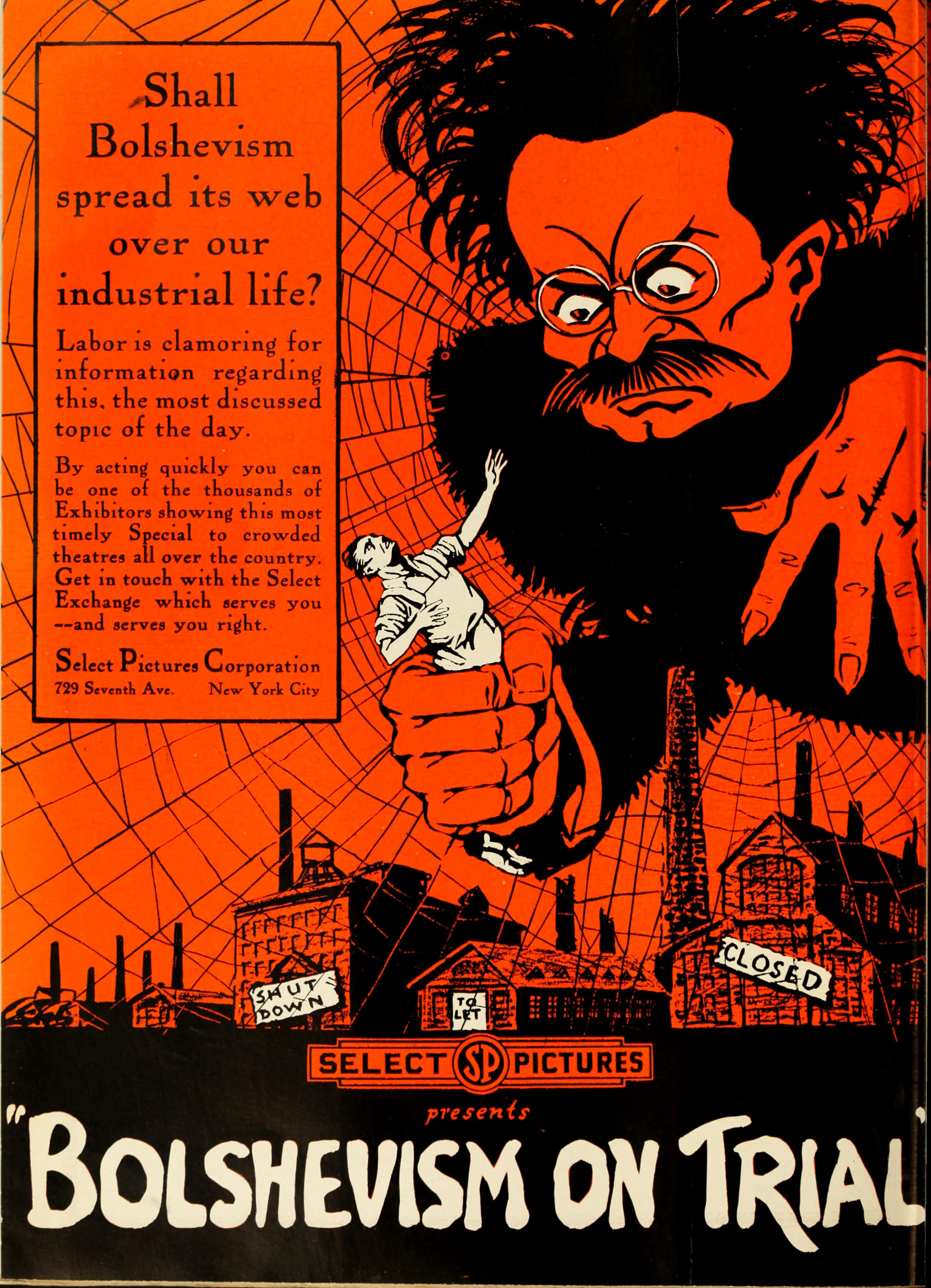
- Theatrical release poster
- Directed by: Harley Knoles
- Written by: Harry Chandlee
- Based on: Comrades: A Story of Social Adventure in California by Thomas Dixon
- Starring: Robert Frazer; Leslie Stowe
- Cinematography: Philip Hatkin
- Production company: Mayflower Photoplay Company
- Distributed by: Select Pictures Corporation
- Release date: April 1919
- Running time: 70 minutes
- Country: United States
- Language: Silent (English intertitles)

Bolshevism on Trial

Bolshevism on Trial is a 1919 American silent propaganda film made by the Mayflower Photoplay Company and distributed through Lewis J. Selznick's Select Pictures Corporation.

Directed by Harley Knoles from a screenplay by Harry Chandlee, it is based on the 1909 novel Comrades: A Story of Social Adventure in California by Thomas Dixon, author of the novels The Clansman: A Historical Romance of the Ku Klux Klan and The Leopard's Spots that served as the basis for The Birth of a Nation. It premiered in April 1919 during the First Red Scare.

== Plot ==
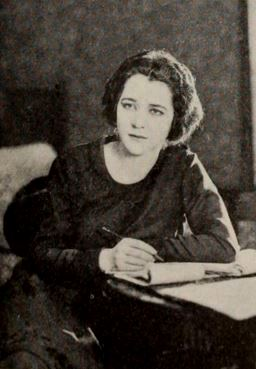
Pinna Nesbit as Barbara Bozenta

Barbara Bozenta, a wealthy female socialite intent on reforming capitalism is lured into the Socialist cause by Herman Wolff, a Socialist agitator. Her concerned boyfriend Norman Worth, a World War I veteran wounded in combat, hears her lecture on the virtues of international socialism and is converted to her views. Prompted by Herman, she raises money among her wealthy friends to buy Paradise Island off the Florida coast to establish a collective colony, a society of "happiness and plenty." Norman tries to raise money from his father and is rebuffed. His father expects Norman will benefit from the experience: "He'll get his island and a lesson along with it." When the wealthy colonists settled on their island, they elect Norman their "Chief Comrade." They quickly discover that none of them has any worthwhile skills. Most identify themselves as "assistant managers." Faced with disorganization, the colonists replace Norman with Herman, as the activist had long intended. He establishes a police force, abolishes marriage, and has the state assume ownership of the women and children. He imprisons Norman, which prompts Barbara's epiphany: "The poor deluded people will starve and die as they are in Russia." She rejects Herman's advances and Norman's father arrives at the head of a U.S. Navy fleet to save the day. Norman lowers the red flag and raises the American flag to general cheers.

== Cast ==
- Robert Frazer as Captain Norman Worth
- Leslie Stowe as Herman Wolff
- Howard Truesdale as Colonel Worth
- Jim Savage as Tom Mooney
- Pinna Nesbit as Barbara Bozenta
- Ethel Wright as Catherine Wolff
- Valda Valkyrien as Elena Worth
- May Hopkins as Blanche
- Luther Standing Bear as Saka
- J.G. Davis as Jim

== Critical reception ==
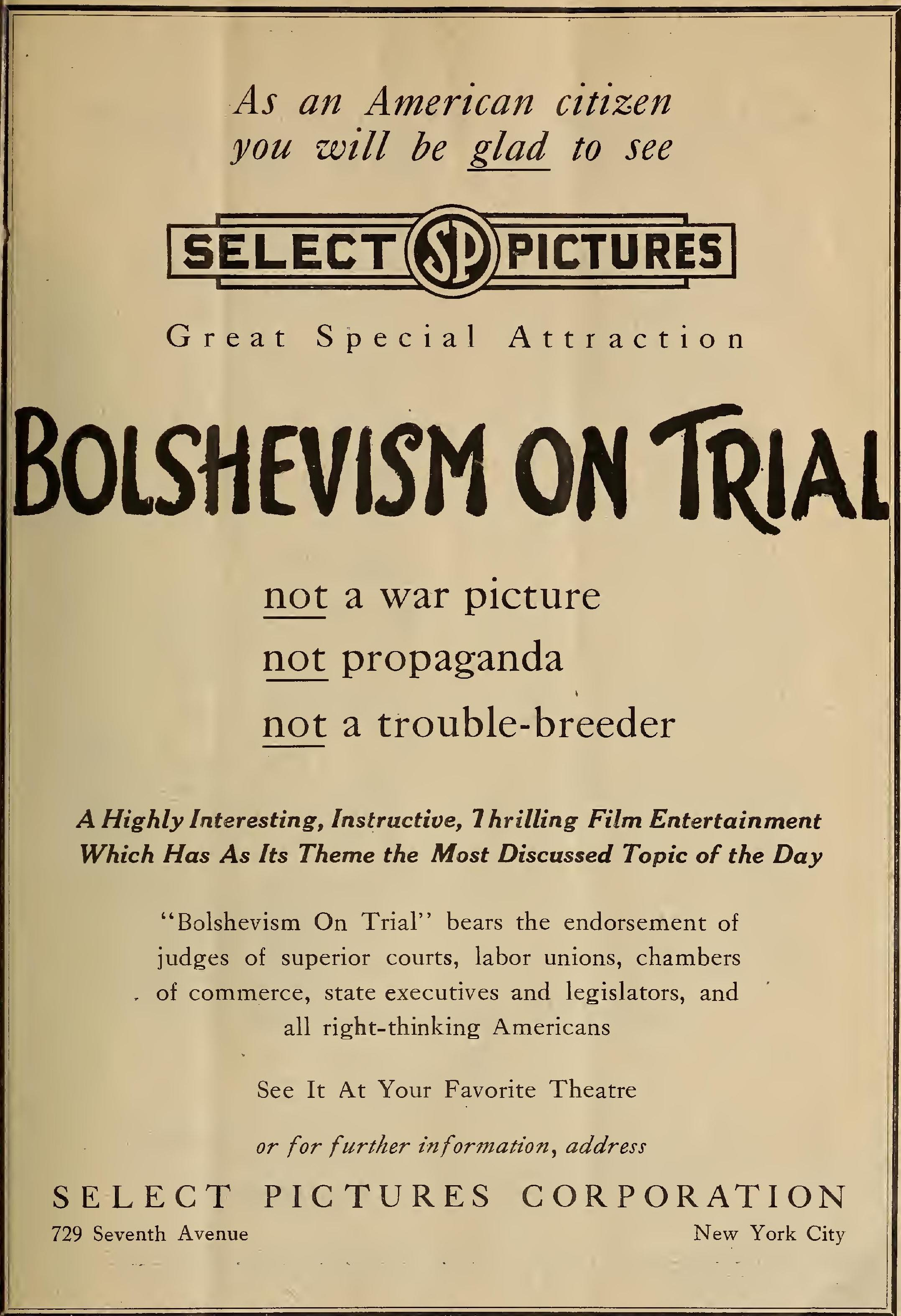
1919 advertisement

The film was shot in Palm Beach, Florida, under the title Shattered Dreams. The Royal Poinciana Hotel was used as a filming location. The film's advertising called it "the timeliest picture ever filmed" and reviews were good. "Powerful, well-knit with indubitably true and biting satire," said Photoplay. As a promotion device, the April 15, 1919, issue of Moving Picture World suggested staging a radical demonstration by hanging red flags around town and then have actors in military uniforms storm in to tear them down. Then distribute handbills to the confused and curious crowds assuring them that Bolshevism on Trial takes a stand against Bolshevism and "you will not only clean up but will profit by future business." When this publicity technique came to the attention of U.S. Secretary of Labor William B. Wilson, he expressed his dismay to the press: "This publication proposes by deceptive methods of advertising to stir every community in the United States into riotous demonstrations for the purpose of making profits for the moving picture business... ." He hoped to ban movies treating Bolshevism and Socialism.
