= Adventures of Carol =

1917 US silent film directed by Harley Knoles

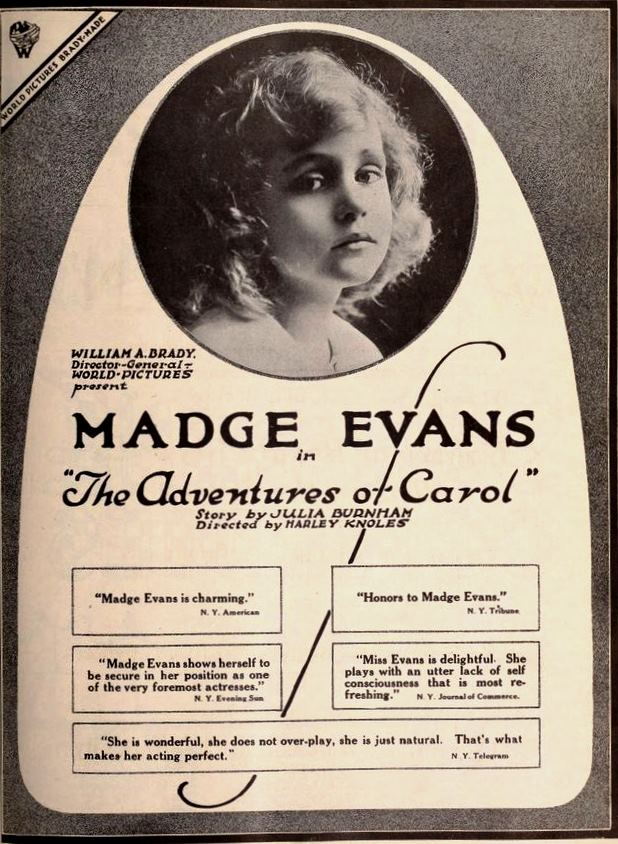
- Directed by: Harley Knoles
- Written by: Julia Burnham
- Produced by: William A. Brady
- Starring: Madge Evans; George MacQuarrie; Rosina Henley
- Cinematography: René Guissart
- Production company: World Film
- Distributed by: World Film
- Release date: November 12, 1917
- Running time: 50 minutes
- Country: United States
- Languages: Silent; English intertitles

Adventures of Carol is a lost 1917 American silent drama film directed by Harley Knoles and starring Madge Evans, George MacQuarrie and Rosina Henley.

== Cast ==
- Madge Evans as Carol Montgomery
- George MacQuarrie as Col. Montgomery
- Rosina Henley as Mrs. Montgomery
- Carl Axzelle as James
- Nick Long Jr. as Beppo
- Kate Lester as Mme. Fairfax
- Jack Drumier as Mr. Fairfax
- Frances Miller as Mammy Lou

== Preservation ==
With no holdings located in archives, Adventures of Carol is considered a lost film.

== Bibliography ==
- Gevinson, Alan. Within Our Gates: Ethnicity in American Feature Films, 1911-1960. University of California Press, 1997.
