= The Great Shadow (film) =

1920 film

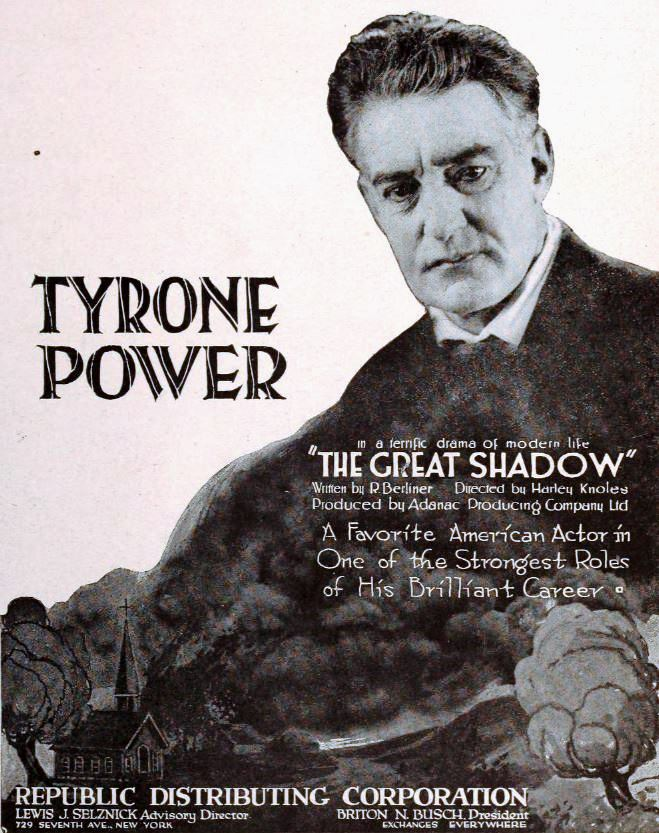
- Directed by: Harley Knoles
- Written by: Rudolph Berliner; Eve Unsell
- Produced by: Lewis J. Selznick; George Brownridge
- Starring: Tyrone Power Sr. Donald Hall; Dorothy Bernard
- Cinematography: George Coudert; Philip Hatkin
- Edited by: Ralph Ince
- Production company: Adanac Producing Company
- Distributed by: Selznick Distributing Corporation
- Release date: April 21, 1920
- Running time: 60 minutes
- Country: United States
- Languages: Silent; English intertitles

The Great Shadow is a 1920 American silent drama film directed by Harley Knoles and starring Tyrone Power Sr., Donald Hall and Dorothy Bernard.

The making of the film is the subject of the Canadian play of the same name, written by Alex Poch-Golden.

== Plot ==
Jim McDonald, the head of a union, struggles against a group of Bolsheviks led by Klimoff. A strike is called and McDonald's child is killed due to sabotage. Elsie, daughter of the capitalist Donald Alexander, is kidnapped by the Bolsheviks, but is saved by her lover, a secret agent.

== Cast ==
- Tyrone Power Sr. as Jim McDonald
- Donald Hall as Donald Alexander
- Dorothy Bernard as Elsie Alexander
- Jack Rutherford as Bob Sherwood
- Louis Stern as Klimoff
- E. Emerson as Greek leader
- Eugene Hornboestel as Frank Shea

== Production ==
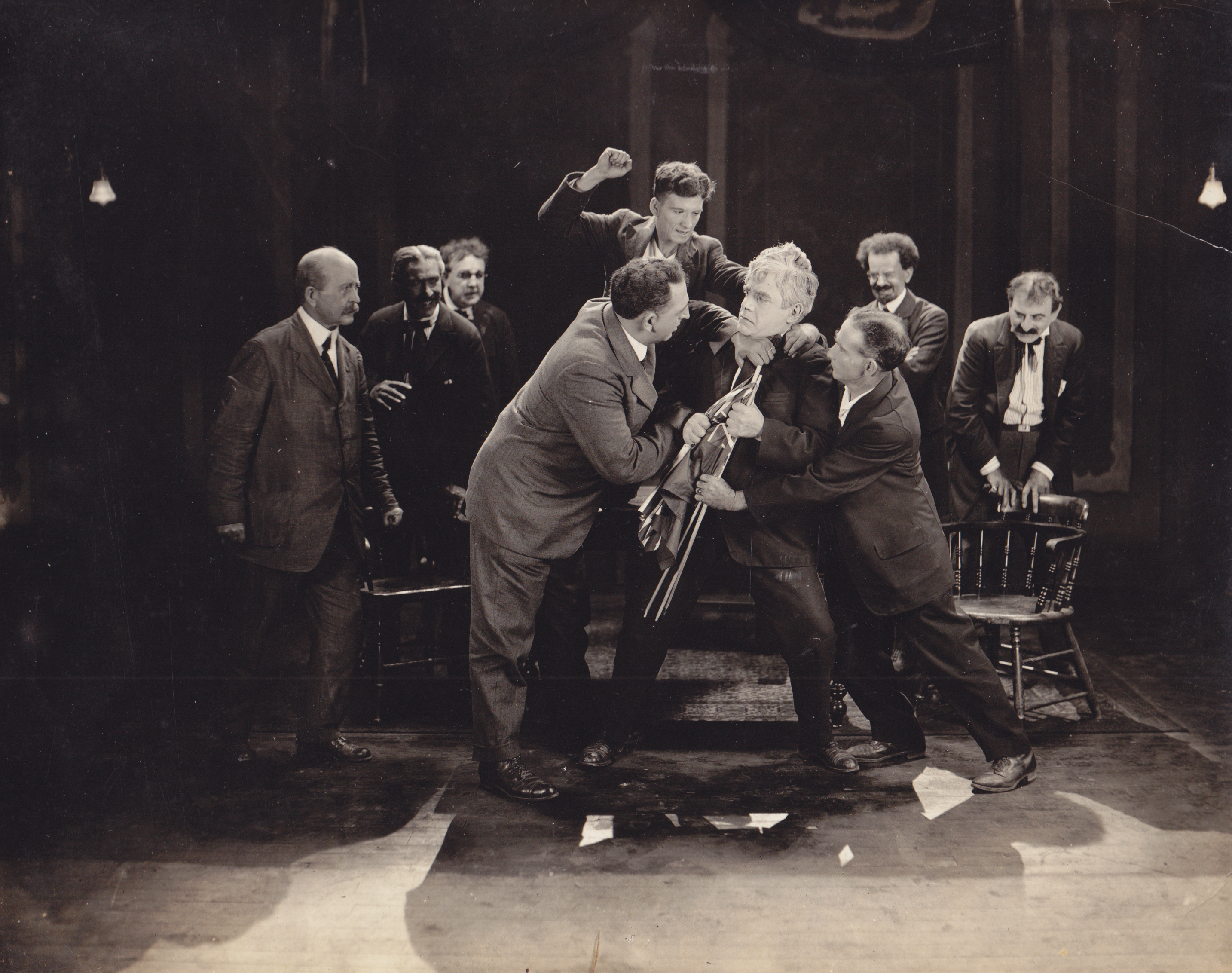
Filming of The Great Shadow in Trenton, Ontario in 1919

The film was sponsored by the Canadian Reconstruction Association. Originally, Travers Vale was assigned to direct the film but dropped out before filming began, and suggested the appointment of Harley Knoles. A Vickers factory in Montreal and a film studio in Trenton, Ontario were used for filming. Union members at the factory were used as unpaid extras.

== Works cited ==
- Khouri, Malek (2007). Filming Politics: Communism and the Portrayal of the Working Class at the National Film Board of Canada, 1939-46. University of Calgary Press. ISBN 9781552381991.

== Bibliography ==
- Connelly, Robert B. The Silents: Silent Feature Films, 1910-36, Volume 40, Issue 2. December Press, 1998.
- Munden, Kenneth White. The American Film Institute Catalog of Motion Pictures Produced in the United States, Part 1. University of California Press, 1997.
