= Carnival (1921 film) =

1921 British film by Harley Knoles

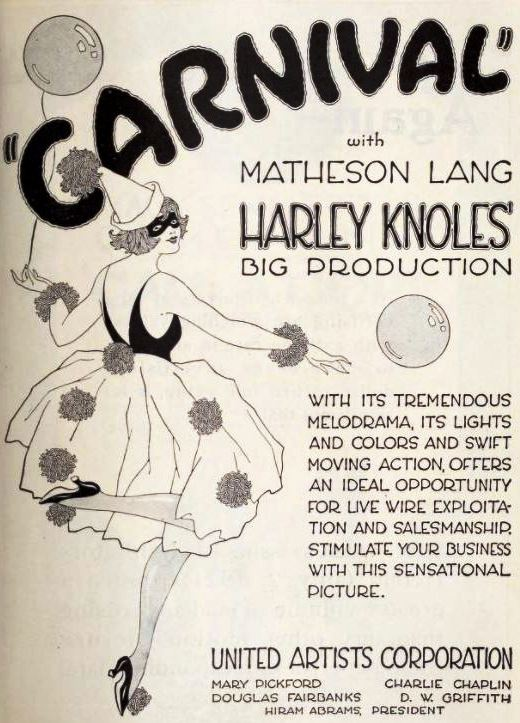
- American advertisement
- Directed by: Harley Knoles
- Written by: Rosina Henley; Adrian Johnson
- Based on: Carnival by H.C.M. Hardinge and Matheson Lang
- Starring: Matheson Lang; Ivor Novello; Hilda Bayley; Clifford Grey
- Cinematography: Philip Hatkin
- Production company: Alliance Film Corporation
- Distributed by: Alliance Film Corporation
- Release dates: March 1921 (UK); 26 June 1921 (US)
- Country: United Kingdom
- Language: Silent (English intertitles)

Carnival is a 1921 British silent drama film directed by Harley Knoles and starring Matheson Lang, Ivor Novello and Hilda Bayley. During a production of William Shakespeare's Othello in Venice, an Italian actor suspects his wife of having an affair and plans to murder her on stage. It was based on a stage play of the year before, of which Matheson Lang was one of the writers. The film was a popular success, and was re-released the following year. In 1931, it was remade as a sound film, Carnival, directed by Herbert Wilcox.

== Cast ==
- Matheson Lang as Sylvio Steno
- Ivor Novello as Count Andrea
- Hilda Bayley as Simonetta, Silvio's wife (credited as Hilda Bailey)
- Clifford Grey as Lelio, Simonetta's brother
- Victor McLaglen as Baron
- Florence Hunter as Nino, Silvio's son
- Maria de Bernaldo as Ottavia, Silvio's sister

== Bibliography ==
- Low, Rachel. The History of British Film: Volume IV, 1918–1929. Routledge, 1997.
