= Home Wanted =

1919 film by Tefft Johnson

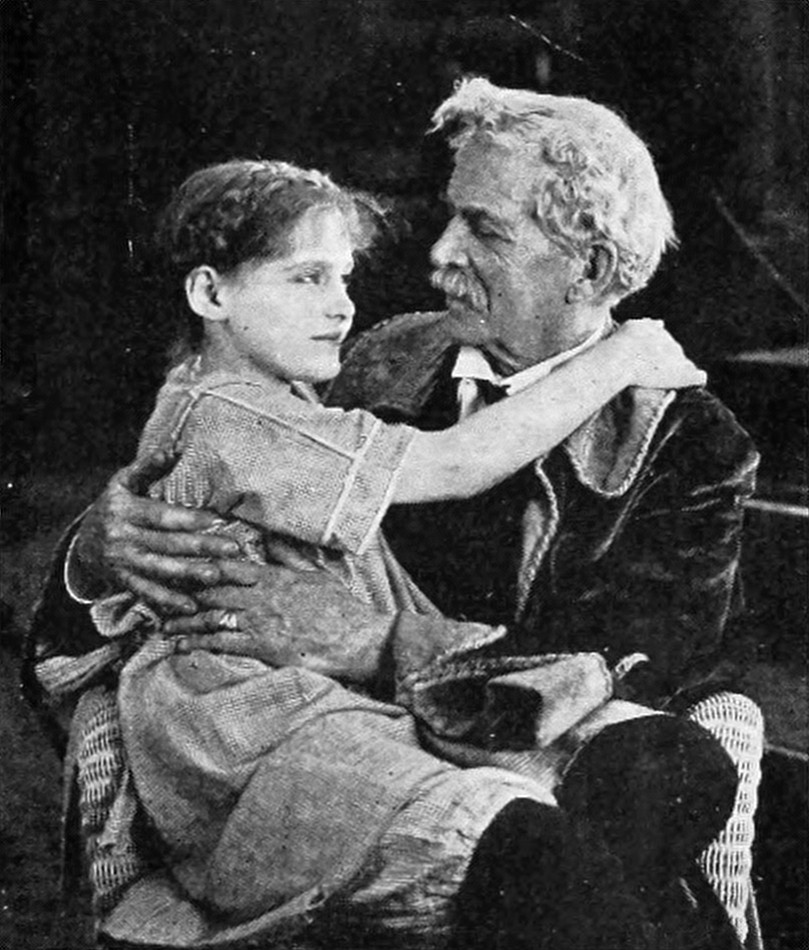
- Still of the film with Madge Evans and W.T. Carleton
- Directed by: Tefft Johnson
- Story by: Lucy Sarver
- Starring: Madge Evans; W.T. Carleton; Anna Lehr
- Cinematography: Philip Hatkin
- Production company: World Film Company
- Distributed by: World Film Company
- Release date: June 30, 1919
- Running time: 5 reels
- Country: United States
- Languages: Silent film (English intertitles)

Home Wanted is a 1919 American silent comedy film directed by William C. Dowlan and starring Madge Evans, W.T. Carleton, and Anna Lehr. The story was written by Lucy Sarver. The film was released by World Film Company on June 30, 1919.

== Plot ==
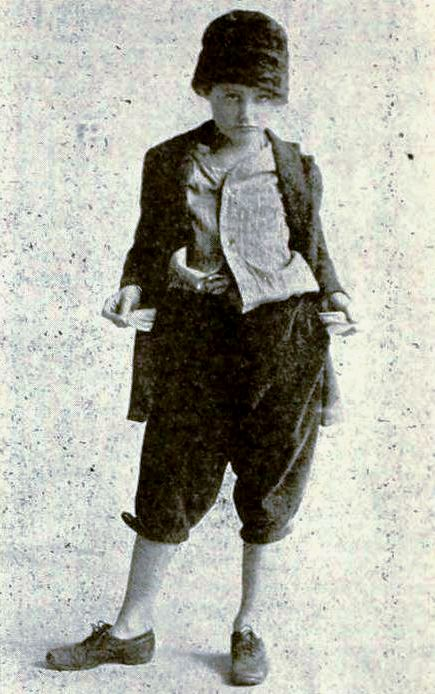
Still of Madge Evans

As described in a film magazine, Madge Dow, a little girl inmate of the Middleport Orphanage. She sees a light every night in the fine home of Major Amesworth, across the way, and in her childish dreams imagines that she some day will be able to find her mother there. She has two very good friends, Spotty, son of the orphanage gardener, and Letty Thompson, a pretty settlement worker. The latter is interested in Dick Washburn, known as Dr. Dick, the latter is also an orphan, who does not know his real name and has been reared by a wealthy lawyer, Jonathan Eastern.

Madge and Spotty flee from the orphanage one night, and went to visit Letty, who telephones the principal that she will keep them for a few days. Letty has a desire to help Madge find a home, and when she learns that the child has been attracted by Major Amesworth's place, she encourages the child to call on the major.

The little girl contrives to follow the suggestion in an amusing manner, and takes the gout-ridden old fellow out for a ride in his wheel chair. A storm comes up and the major is soaked. Then Madge leaves him, and the wheel chair runs away with him. Dr. Dick finds the major and takes him to his own home for treatment which he eventually discovers that the major is his grandfather.

Affairs come to a crisis after the major has been returned to his home. Madge succeeds in bringing a reconciliation between the major and Dr. Dick. The latter wins Letty in spite of her mother's former opposition to the match, and in this way. Madge comes info her happiness.

== Cast ==
- Madge Evans as Madge Dow
- W.T. Carleton as Major Amesworth
- Anna Lehr as Letty Thompson
- Jack Drumier as Pierre
- Hugh Thompson as Dick Washburn
- Charles Sutton as Jonathan Eastern
- Maude Turner Gordon as Mrs. William Thompson
- Winifred Leighton as Martha
- Michael J. Hanlon as Spotty

== Production ==
In May 1919, World Film announced that they purchased an original story by Lucy Sarver which would be used as the star vehicle for Madge Evans and that work would begin on May 12.

== Reception ==
Moving Picture World gave this film a positive review, praising production quality and humor and that should appeal to women and children.

Variety's review was negative, having positive things to say for the actors, but found the story to be unpleasant, saying "author and director have sacrificed whatever value this offering might have in the best picture houses."

== Preservation ==
It is unknown whether the film survives as no copies have been located, likely lost.
