= The Adopted Son (1917 film) =

1917 film by Charles Brabin

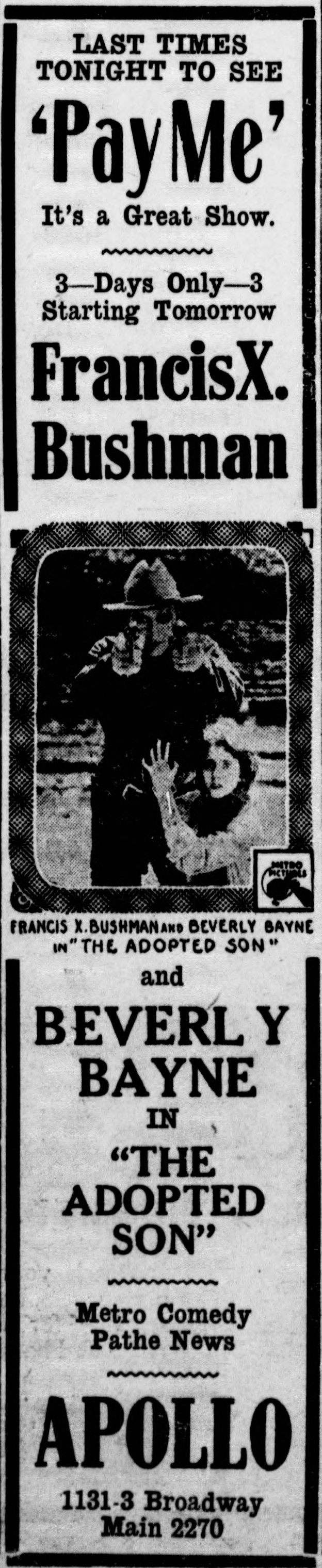
- Newspaper advertisement
- Directed by: Charles Brabin
- Written by: Albert Shelby Le Vino
- Based on: the short story "The Adopted Son" by Max Brand
- Produced by: Maxwell Karger
- Starring: Francis X. Bushman; Beverly Bayne; Leslie Stowe
- Cinematography: R. J. Bergquist
- Production companies: Metro Pictures; Rolfe Photoplays
- Release date: October 29, 1917 (US)
- Running time: 6 reels
- Country: United States
- Language: English (intertitles)

The Adopted Son is a lost 1917 American silent drama film directed by Charles Brabin and starring Francis X. Bushman, Beverly Bayne, and Leslie Stowe. It was released on October 29, 1917.

== Plot ==
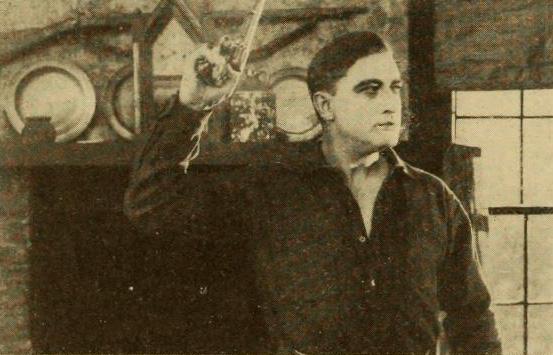
Francis Bushman

In the hills of Tennessee, a feud has existed for many years between the Conover's and the McLane's. Once a year, during the annual county fair, there is a truce between the families. As the truce ends, George Conover is ambushed by Henry McLane and killed. "Two Gun" Carter, who has just arrived in the area from Texas, witnesses the murder and carries the dead McLane back to his family. The entire clan is overcome by grief for the death of their kinsman, and the dead man's sister, Marian Conover, pleads with Carter to be adopted into their clan.

Marian and Carter fall in love with one another, and eventually Carter proposes that he and Henry McLane fight a duel in order to end the feud. When Henry refuses to fight Carter, the leader of the McLane clan, Tom, agrees to take Henry's place. As the contest is being set up, Carter learns that he is actually a member of the McLane clan. He and Marian also make plans to marry. The day of the contest, Carter explains to Tom his heritage, but as they are talking, word comes to them that Henry has abducted Marian. The duel forgotten, Carter charges off to rescue Marian. During the course of the rescue, Henry falls off a cliff. Marian and Carter announce their plans to marry, and Tom let's everyone know that Carter is a McLane, thus ending the feud.

== Cast list ==
- Francis X. Bushman as Two Gun Carter
- Beverly Bayne as Marian Conover
- Leslie Stowe as Tom McLane
- J. W. Johnston as Henry McLane
- John Smiley as Luke Conover
- Gertrude Norman as Mrs. Conover
- Pat O'Malley as George Conover

== Production ==
In August 1917 it was announced that Metro had obtained the rights to an unpublished, untitled story by Max Brand. This was one of several films which paired Bushman with Bayne, and was produced in Ithaca, New York. In September 1917 it was announced that Bushman and Bayne had gone on location to film sequences for the picture, which was at that time still untitled. The original working title for the film was God's Outlaw. By mid-October the film's titled had been changed to The Adopted Son. The story, by Max Brand, was scheduled to be published simultaneously in All-Story Weekly with the picture's release. The magazine's cover art featured Bushman and Bayne. The film was released on October 29, 1917.

== Reception ==
While not complimentary of Bushman's performance, Photoplay felt that this film was "...one of the best feud stories the screen has recorded." They felt the exterior shots were magnificent, and found the performances of the supporting cast, particularly that of J. W. Johnston, were exemplary.

== Preservation ==
With no holdings located in archives, The Adopted Son is considered a lost film.
