= Harley Knoles =

British film director

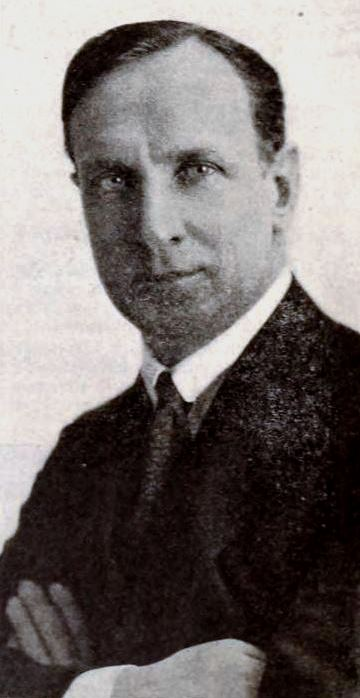
- From a 1921 magazine
- Born: 4 June 1880; Rotherham, Yorkshire; United Kingdom
- Died: 6 January 1936 (aged 55); London; United Kingdom
- Occupation(s): Film director Screenwriter
- Spouse(s): Pinna Nesbit; Rosina Henley

Harry Knoles (1880-1936) was a British film director of the silent era.

== Selected filmography ==
- The Greater Will (1915)
- The Master Hand (1915)
- Bought and Paid For (1916)
- His Brother's Wife (1916)
- The Devil's Toy (1916)
- The Volunteer (1917)
- The Stolen Paradise (1917)
- The Price of Pride (1917)
- Adventures of Carol (1917)
- The Little Duchess (1917)
- A Square Deal (1917)
- The Burglar (1917)
- Souls Adrift (1917)
- The Page Mystery (1917)
- The Social Leper (1917)
- Stolen Orders (1918)
- Little Women (1918)
- Bolshevism on Trial (1919)
- Guilty of Love (1920)
- Half an Hour (1920)
- A Romantic Adventuress (1920)
- The Great Shadow (1920)
- Carnival (1921)
- The Bohemian Girl (1922)
- Lew Tyler's Wives (1926)
- Oh, Baby! (1926)
- Land of Hope and Glory (1927)
- The White Sheik (1928)
- The Rising Generation (1928)
- Irish Hearts (1934)
