= List of World Film films =

List of films produced or distributed by the American company World Film Company active between 1914 and 1919. The company also released a number of imported foreign films for the American market. The company was merged into Selznick Pictures.

== 1914 ==
- The Brass Bottle (1914)
- Uncle Tom's Cabin (1914)
- The Lure (1914)
- The Dollar Mark (1914)
- Mother (1914)
- The Chimes (1914)
- A Gentleman from Mississippi (1914)
- The Man of the Hour (1914)
- Your Girl and Mine: A Woman Suffrage Play (1914)
- The Mystery of Edwin Drood (1914)
- When Broadway Was a Trail (1914)
- Across the Pacific (1914)
- The Wishing Ring (1914)
- One of Millions (1914)
- Lola (1914)
- The Dancer and the King (1914)
- The Seats of the Mighty (1914)
- The Marked Woman (1914)
- As Ye Sow (1914)
- The Pit (1914)
- In the Name of the Prince of Peace (1914)
- Mrs. Wiggs of the Cabbage Patch (1914)

== 1915 ==
- The Deep Purple (1915)
- Mignon (1915)
- Wildfire (1915)
- The Daughter of the People (1915)
- Old Dutch (1915)
- Alias Jimmy Valentine (1915)
- Money (1915)
- The Fairy and the Waif (1915)
- M'Liss (1915)
- The Fight (1915)
- What Happened to Jones (1915)
- The Arrival of Perpetua (1915)
- The Man Who Found Himself (1915)
- Hearts in Exile (1915)
- The Lily of Poverty Flat (1915)
- The Model (1915)
- The Butterfly (1915)
- When It Strikes Home (1915)
- The Boss (1915)
- The Builder of Bridges (1915)
- The Little Miss Brown (1915)
- Fine Feathers (1915)
- The Moonstone (1915)
- The Face in the Moonlight (1915)
- A Phyllis of the Sierras (1915)
- Colonel Carter of Cartersville (1915)
- After Dark (1915)
- The Cub (1915)
- Marrying Money (1915)
- Sunday (1915)
- The Stolen Voice (1915)
- The Little Dutch Girl (1915)
- The Master Hand (1915)
- The Cotton King (1915)
- The Impostor (1915)
- The Ivory Snuff Box (1915)
- Evidence (1915)
- Trilby (1915)
- The Flash of an Emerald (1915)
- The Little Mademoiselle (1915)
- The Master of the House (1915)
- The Price (1915)
- Blue Grass (1915)
- The Family Cupboard (1915)
- The Heart of the Blue Ridge (1915)
- The Bludgeon (1915)
- Salvation Nell (1915)
- Should a Wife Forgive? (1915)
- The Butterfly on the Wheel (1915)
- The Cowardly Way (1915)
- Hearts of Men (1915)
- Body and Soul (1915)
- A Daughter of the Sea (1915)
- The Sins of Society (1915)
- The Gray Mask (1915)
- The Warning (1915)
- The Siren's Song (1915)
- The Labyrinth (1915)
- Over Night (1915)
- Sealed Lips (1915)
- Camille (1915)
- The Senator (1915)
- The Rack (1915)
- The Ransom (1915)

== 1916 ==
- Her Great Hour (1916)
- The Dragon (1916)
- McTeague (1916)
- Behind Closed Doors (1916)
- The City (1916)
- A Circus Romance (1916)
- The Ballet Girl (1916)
- The Clarion (1916)
- Fruits of Desire (1916)
- The Woman in 47 (1916)
- The Yellow Passport (1916)
- A Woman's Power (1916)
- Pawn of Fate (1916)
- The Price of Happiness (1916)
- As in a Looking Glass (1916)
- The Devil's Toy (1916)
- Passers By (1916)
- The Unpardonable Sin (1916)
- Man and His Angel (1916)
- The Supreme Sacrifice (1916)
- The Hand of Peril (1916)
- The Struggle (1916)
- The Reapers (1916)
- Then I'll Come Back to You (1916)
- Human Driftwood (1916)
- The Shadow of a Doubt (1916)
- Who Killed Simon Baird? (1916)
- The Social Highwayman (1916)
- The Closed Road (1916)
- The Chain Invisible (1916)
- The Feast of Life (1916)
- Bought and Paid For (1916)
- Her Maternal Right (1916)
- Sudden Riches (1916)
- The Twin Triangle (1916)
- Tangled Fates (1916)
- His Brother's Wife (1916)
- The Perils of Divorce (1916)
- La Bohème (1916)
- What Happened at 22 (1916)
- Fate's Boomerang (1916)
- The Crucial Test (1916)
- Paying the Price (1916)
- Sally in Our Alley (1916)
- The Weakness of Man (1916)
- Miss Petticoats (1916)
- A Woman's Way (1916)
- The Summer Girl (1916)
- The Rail Rider (1916)
- Husband and Wife (1916)
- The Almighty Dollar (1916)
- The Velvet Paw (1916)
- Friday the 13th (1916)
- The Dark Silence (1916)
- The Revolt (1916)
- The Gilded Cage (1916)
- The Hidden Scar (1916)
- The Scarlet Oath (1916)
- The Man Who Stood Still (1916)
- The Heart of a Hero (1916)
- The Faun (1916)
- Beyond the Wall (1916)
- The Men She Married (1916)
- All Man (1916)
- The New South (1916)
- The Rise of Susan (1916)
- The World Against Him (1916)

== 1917 ==
- A Woman Alone (1917)
- On Dangerous Ground (1917)
- The Man Who Forgot (1917)
- The Bondage of Fear (1917)
- Tillie Wakes Up (1917)
- A Hungry Heart (1917)
- The Red Woman (1917)
- A Square Deal (1917)
- A Girl's Folly (1917)
- The Web of Desire (1917)
- The Dancer's Peril (1917)
- The Social Leper (1917)
- As Man Made Her (1917)
- Man's Woman (1917)
- The Family Honor (1917)
- Forget Me Not (1917)
- Darkest Russia (1917)
- The Page Mystery (1917)
- Moral Courage (1917)
- Yankee Pluck (1917)
- Maternity (1917)
- The Crimson Dove (1917)
- The False Friend (1917)
- The Stolen Paradise (1917)
- The Divorce Game (1917)
- The Price of Pride (1917)
- The Brand of Satan (1917)
- Beloved Adventuress (1917)
- The Iron Ring (1917)
- Youth (1917)
- Souls Adrift (1917)
- The Little Duchess (1917)
- The Guardian (1917)
- The Tides of Fate (1917)
- Rasputin, the Black Monk (1917)
- Betsy Ross (1917)
- The Burglar (1917)
- The Corner Grocer (1917)
- A Maid of Belgium (1917)
- Shall We Forgive Her? (1917)
- The Dormant Power (1917)
- Easy Money (1917)
- A Self-Made Widow (1917)
- Adventures of Carol (1917)
- Her Hour (1917)
- The Awakening (1917)
- The Good for Nothing (1917)
- The Tenth Case (1917)
- The Volunteer (1917)
- Diamonds and Pearls (1917)
- The Marriage Market (1917)
- The Strong Way (1917)
- The Woman Beneath (1917)

== 1918 ==
- Stolen Hours (1918)
- The Beautiful Mrs. Reynolds (1918)
- The Gates of Gladness (1918)
- The Divine Sacrifice (1918)
- The Whims of Society (1918)
- Broken Ties (1918)
- His Royal Highness (1918)
- The Spurs of Sybil (1918)
- The Wasp (1918)
- Wanted: A Mother (1918)
- The Way Out (1918)
- The Cross Bearer (1918)
- The Witch Woman (1918)
- The Trap (1918)
- The Purple Lily (1918)
- Leap to Fame (1918)
- Journey's End (1918)
- Vengeance (1918)
- The Oldest Law (1918)
- Stolen Orders (1918)
- The Interloper (1918)
- The Cabaret (1918)
- The Unchastened Woman (1918)
- The Man Hunt (1918)
- A Woman of Redemption (1918)
- The Heart of a Girl (1918)
- Tinsel (1918)
- The Golden Wall (1918)
- Joan of the Woods (1918)
- Neighbors (1918)
- Heredity (1918)
- The Beloved Blackmailer (1918)
- Merely Players (1918)
- Inside the Lines (1918)
- Eight Bells (1918)
- The Power and the Glory (1918)
- By Hook or Crook (1918)
- T'Other Dear Charmer (1918)
- To Him That Hath (1918)
- A Soul Without Windows (1918)
- Appearance of Evil (1918)
- The Road to France (1918)
- Just Sylvia (1918)
- The Grouch (1918)
- Hitting the Trail (1918)
- The Man of Bronze (1918)
- The Zero Hour (1918)
- The Love Net (1918)
- The Sea Waif (1918)
- Little Orphant Annie (1918)

== 1919 ==
- What Love Forgives (1919)
- Love in a Hurry (1919)
- The Bluffer (1919)
- Heart of Gold (1919)
- The Rough Neck (1919)
- Mandarin's Gold (1919)
- Courage for Two (1919)
- The Moral Deadline (1919)
- The Crook of Dreams (1919)
- The Hand Invisible (1919)
- The Unveiling Hand (1919)
- Hit or Miss (1919)
- The Love Defender (1919)
- The Little Intruder (1919)
- The Scar (1919)
- The Quickening Flame (1919)
- Three Green Eyes (1919)
- Ginger (1919)
- The Unwritten Code (1919)
- The Social Pirate (1919)
- An Amateur Widow (1919)
- Phil for Short (1919)
- Through the Toils (1919)
- The Devil's Trail (1919)
- Love and the Woman (1919)
- Home Wanted (1919)
- The American Way (1919)
- Dust of Desire (1919)
- A Broadway Saint (1919)
- Bringing Up Betty (1919)
- Coax Me (1919)
- The Praise Agent (1919)
- The Clouded Name (1919)
- The Battler (1919)
- His Father's Wife (1919)
- Forest Rivals (1919)
- Miss Crusoe (1919)
- The Oakdale Affair (1919)
- The Woman of Lies (1919)
- The Black Circle (1919)
- The Arizona Cat Claw (1919)
- When Bearcat Went Dry (1919)
- Me and Captain Kidd (1919)
- The Poison Pen (1919)
- The Steel King (1919)

== Bibliography ==
- Koszarski, Richard . Fort Lee: The Film Town (1904-2004). Indiana University Press, 2005.
- Slide, Anthony. The New Historical Dictionary of the American Film Industry. Routledge, 2014.
