= Kitty Gordon =

English stage and silent film actress

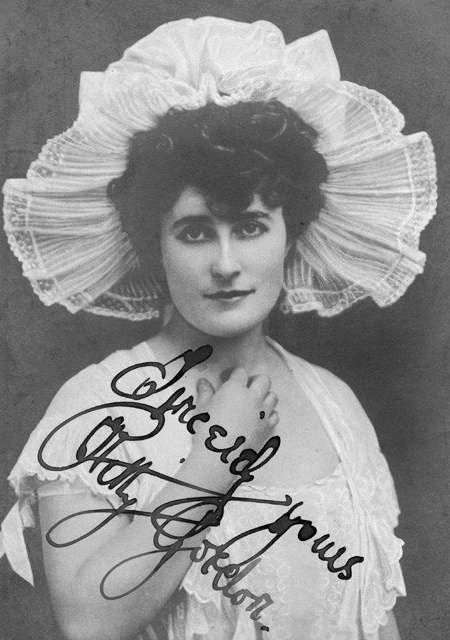
- Gordon, early 1900s
- Born: Constance Minnie Blades; 22 April 1878; Folkestone, Kent, U.K.
- Died: 26 May 1974 (aged 96); Brentwood, New York, U.S.
- Occupation: Actor
- Spouse(s): Maxwell James; Michael Levenston (Dec 10, 1903–Mar 29, 1904) (his death); Captain Henry Beresford (Oct. 1904 – 1924. his death); Ralph Ranlet (1932 – ?)

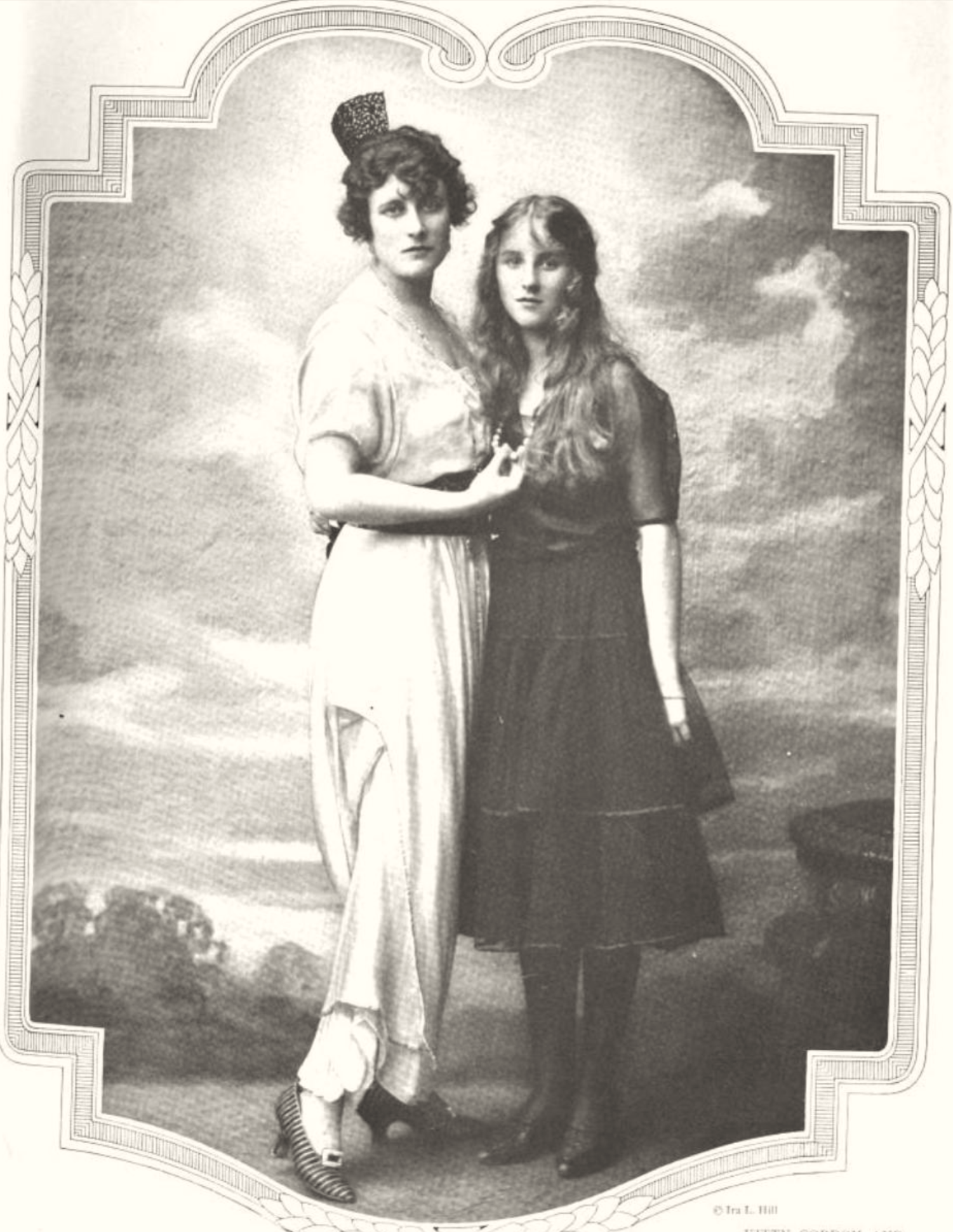
Kitty Gordon with her daughter, the actress Vera Beresford.

Kitty Gordon (born Constance Minnie Blades; 22 April 1878 – 26 May 1974) was an English stage and silent film actress.

== Career ==
Constance Minnie Blades was born in Folkestone, Kent, to Col. Blades of the Royal Artillery. Her first professional stage appearance was at the Princes Theatre in Bristol in 1901 in the touring production of San Toy. She appeared in The Duchess of Dantzic in 1903, the operetta Véronique in 1904 and The Three Kisses in 1907. In 1909 she moved to New York City, where she became a regular on the New York stage.

On 19 October 1911, Gordon starred in the premiere of composer Victor Herbert's operetta The Enchantress at the National Theatre in Washington, D.C. Herbert wrote the title role specifically for her. She remained with the production when it transferred to the New York Theatre on Broadway later that month and toured in the piece for two years, until she fell ill.

She made her first film appearance in 1916 in As in a Looking Glass. During the next three years she made twenty-one films. She continued her stage work from 1919 onwards. She also made television appearances. Her final appearance on television was in 1952 on the program Life Begins at Eighty.

== Personal life ==
Her first husband was Maxwell James with whom she had a child, Vera. She later also had a career as an actress known on the stage and in film as Vera Beresforf. After his death, she married theatre manager Michael Levenston on 10 December 1903. He died on 29 March 1904, and in October 1904, Kitty married Captain Henry "Harry" Horsley-Beresford (1876– 1924), a son of the 3rd Baron Decies. Kitty's child became Cynthia Vera Beresford, who became an actress. In 1932 Kitty married Ralph Ranlet. Kitty's daughter Vera died in 1945.

Kitty Gordon died in a nursing home in Brentwood, New York in 1974.

== Filmography ==
Year	Title	Role	Notes
1916	As in a Looking Glass	Lila Despard	Lost film
1916	Her Maternal Right	Nina Seabury	Lost film
1916	The Crucial Test	Thanya	Lost film
1917	Vera, the Medium	Vera	Lost film
1917	Forget Me Not	Stefanie Paoli	Lost film
1917	The Beloved Adventuress	Juliette La Monde	Lost film
1917	Her Hour	Rita Castle	Lost film
1917	National Red Cross Pageant	Bruges	Flemish episode Lost film
1917	Diamonds and Pearls	Violetta D'Arcy	Lost film
1917	The Volunteer	Herself, Cameo Appearance	Lost film
1918	The Divine Sacrifice	Madeline Spencer	Lost film
1918	The Wasp	Grace Culver	Lost film
1918	The Purple Lily	Marie Burguet	Lost film
1918	Stolen Orders	Felicia Gaveston	Lost film
1918	The Interloper	Jane Cameron	Lost film
1918	Tinsel	Princess Sylvia Carzoni	
1918	Merely Players	Nadine Trent	Lost film
1919	Adele	Adele Bleneau	Lost film
1919	Mandarin's Gold	Betty Cardon	Lost film
1919	The Unveiling Hand	Margaret Ellis	Lost film
1919	The Scar	Cora	Lost film
1919	Playthings of Passion	Helen Rowland	Lost film

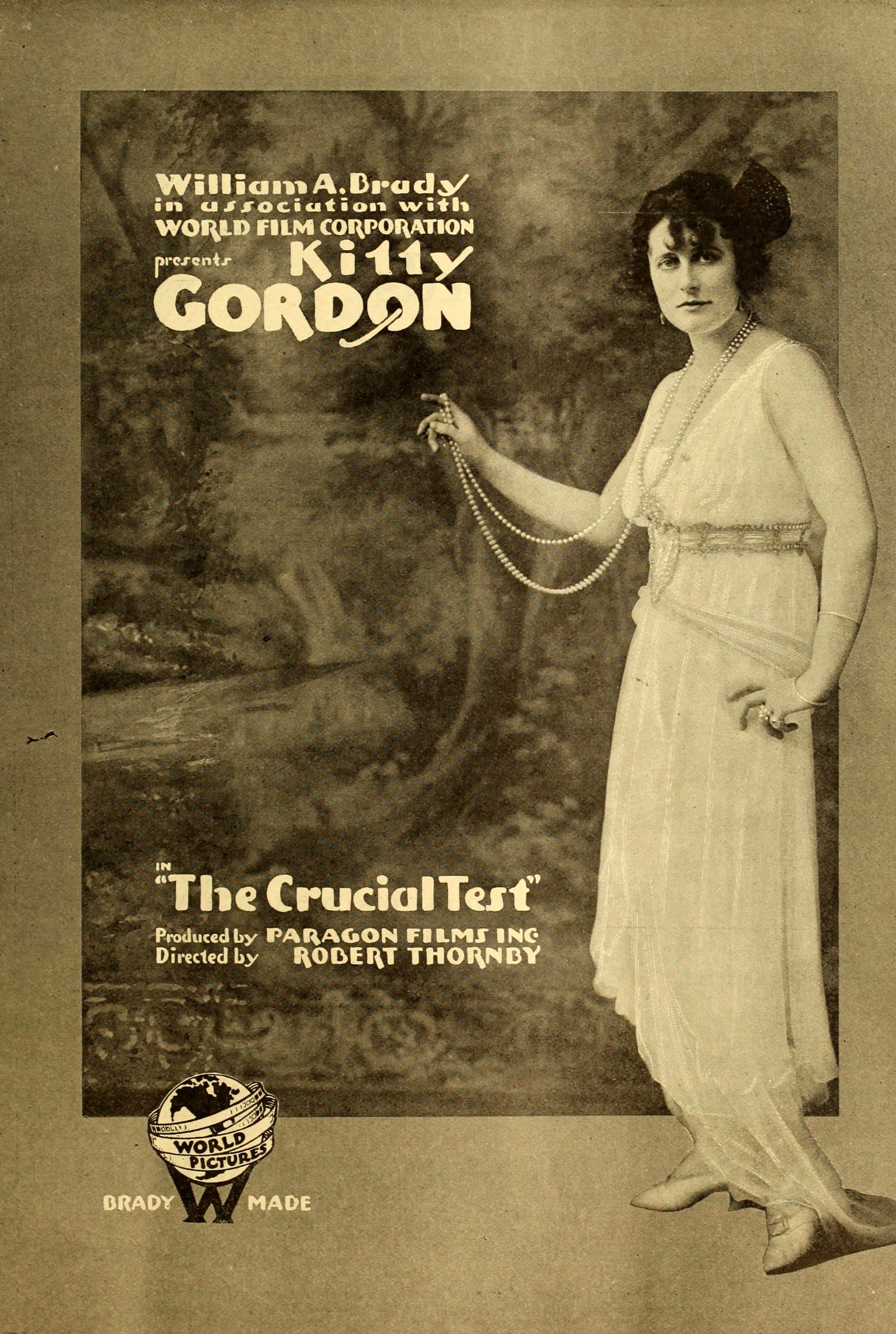
The Crucial Test (1916)

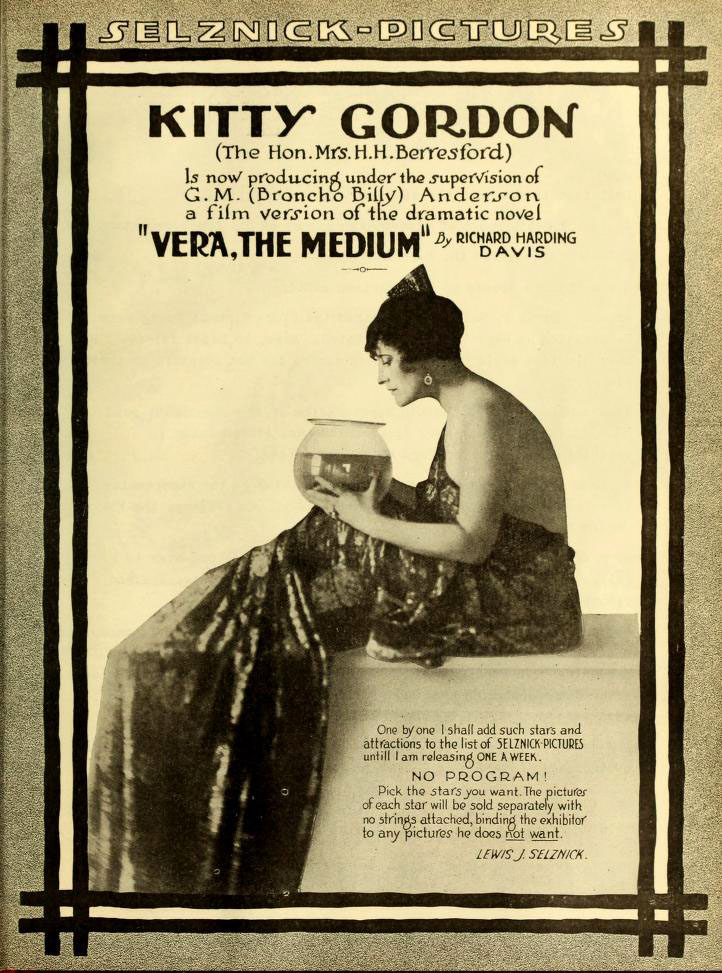
Vera the Medium (1916)

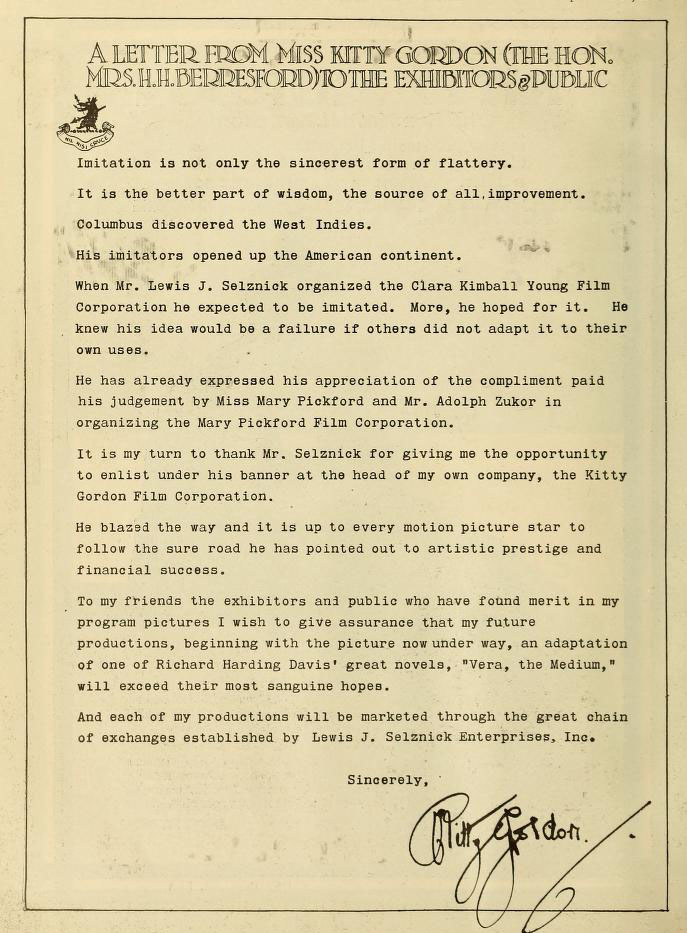
Advertisement (1916)

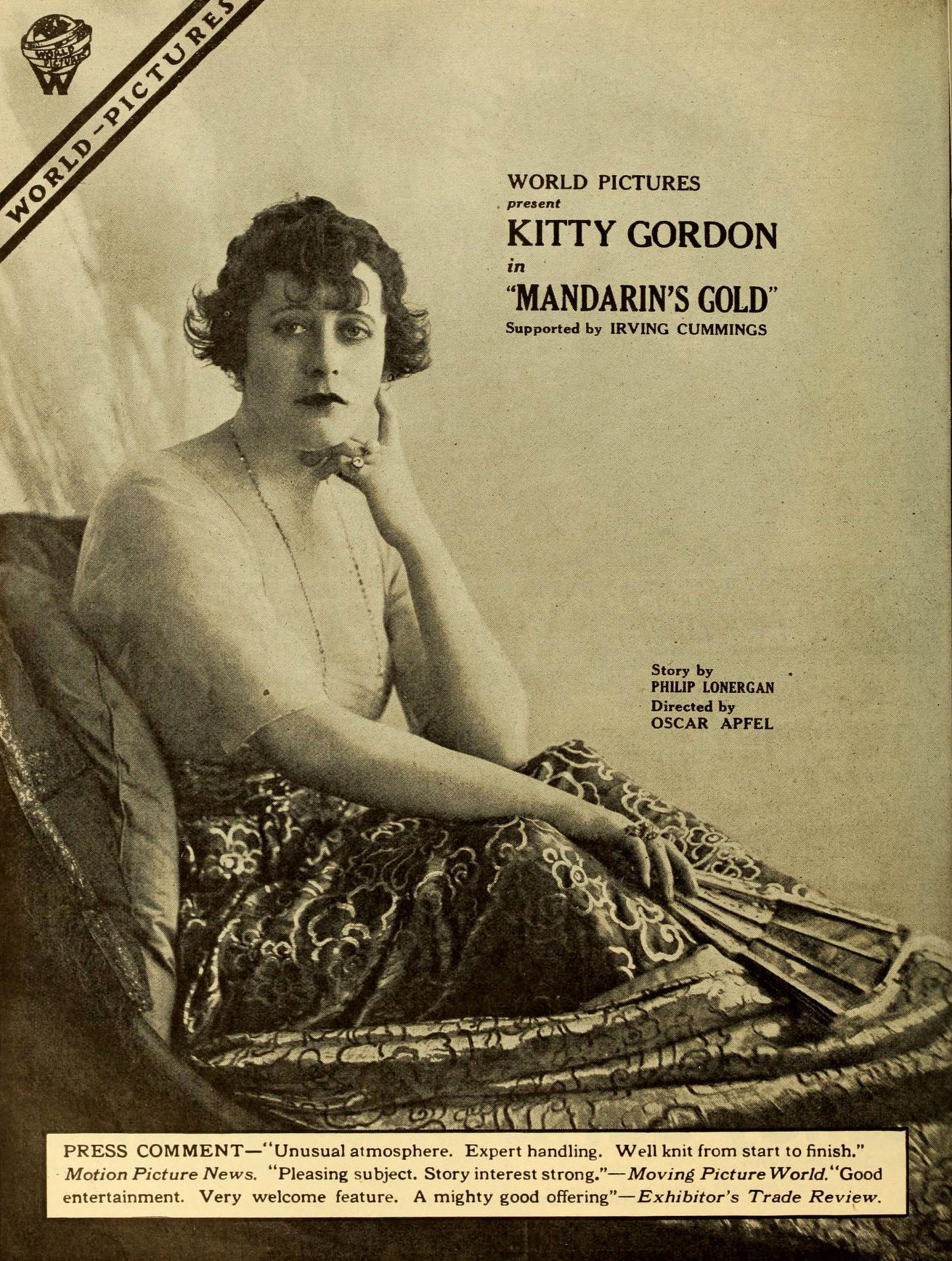
Mandarin's Gold (1919)
