= George MacQuarrie =

American actor (1873–1951)

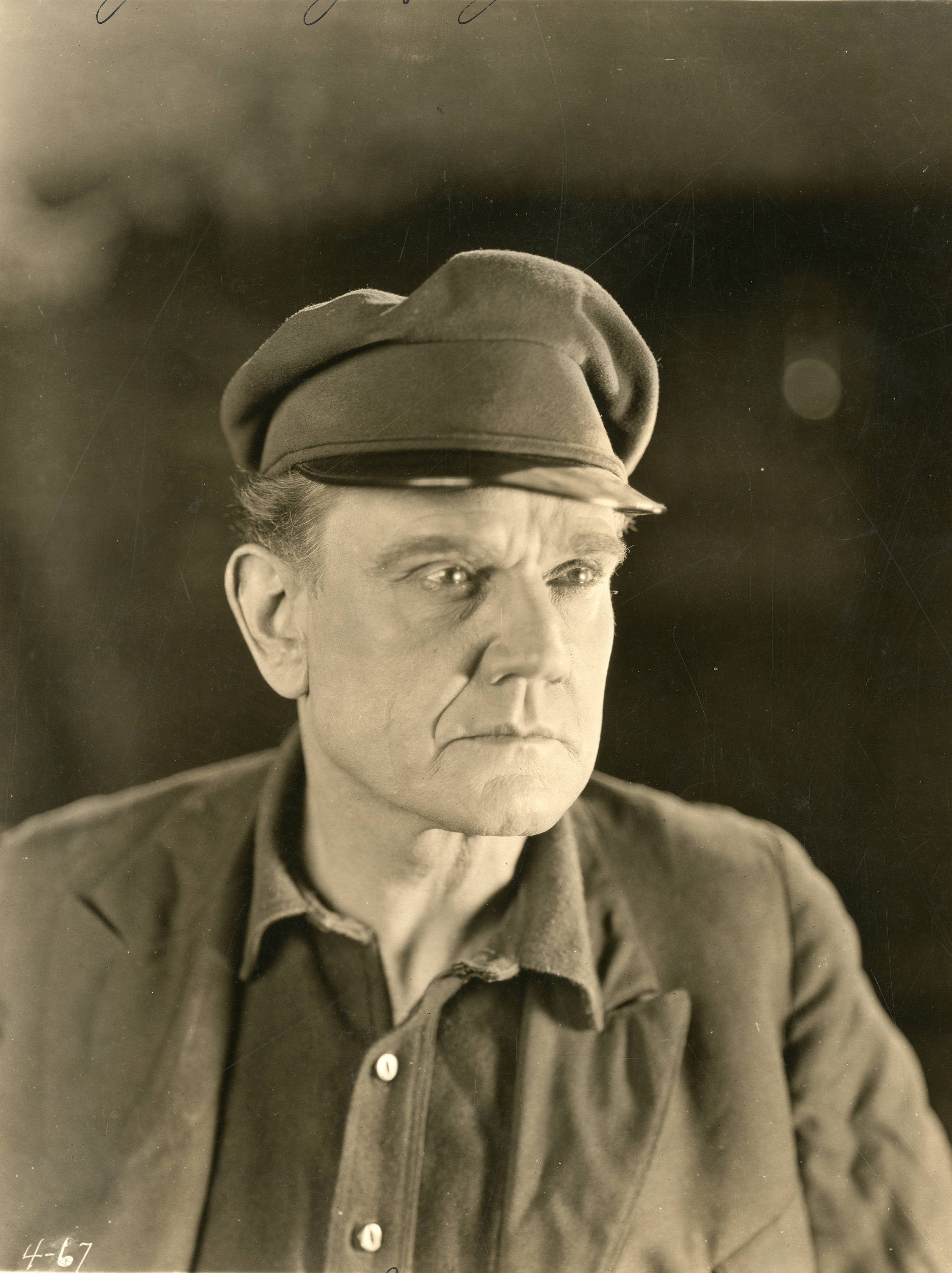
- MacQuarrie in 1924
- Born: George Donald MacQuarrie; June 2, 1873; San Francisco, California
- Died: April 1951 (aged 77)
- Occupation: Actor
- Years active: 1916-1951
- Spouse: Helen MacKellar

George MacQuarrie (born as George Donald MacQuarrie; June 2, 1873 – April 1951), was an American actor of the silent era.

== Biography ==
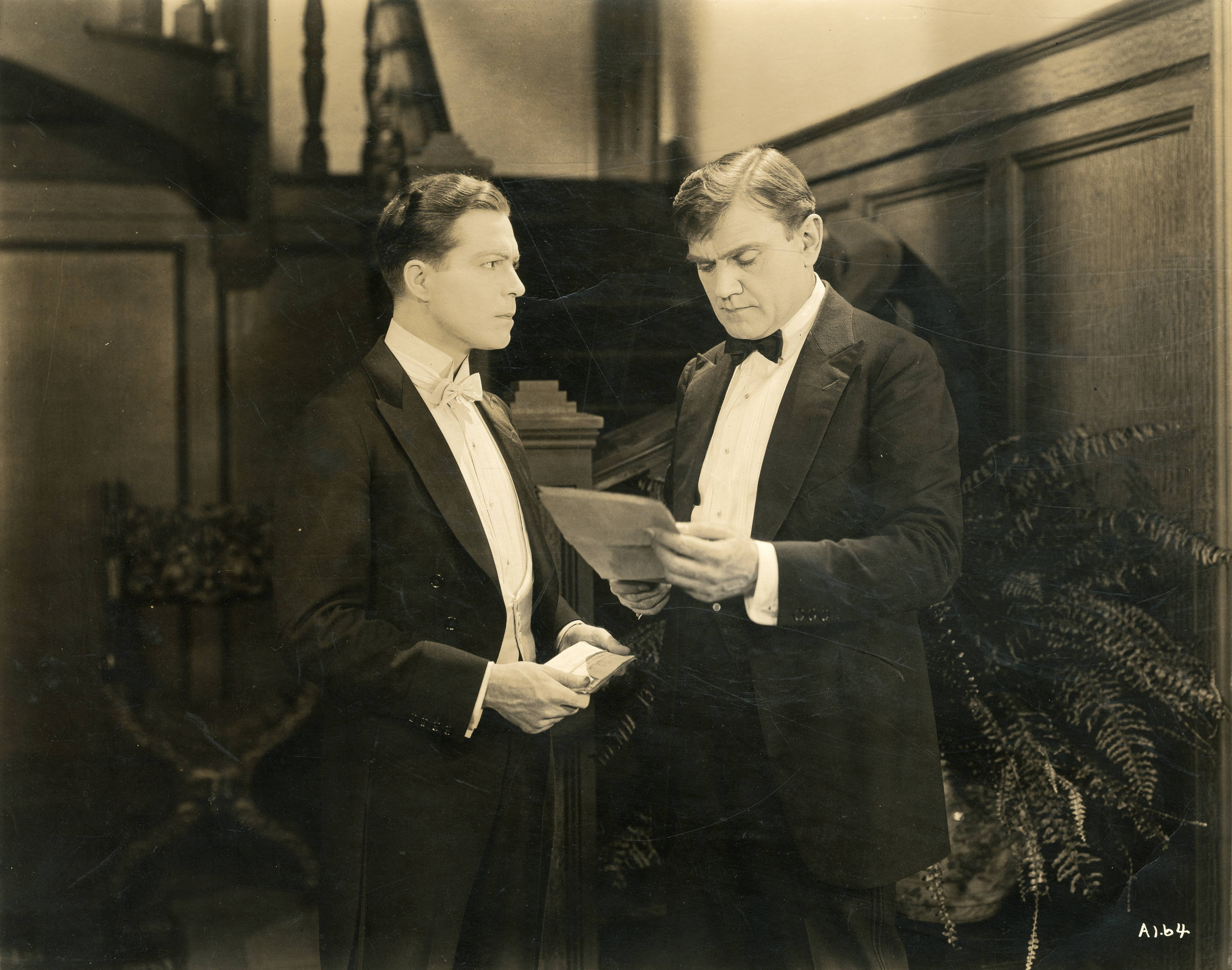
Harrison Ford and MacQuarrie in Find the Woman (1922)

MacQuarrie was born in San Francisco, California in 1873 as George Donald MacQuarrie. He appeared in more than 80 films between 1916 and 1951. His brothers were Murdock MacQuarrie, Frank MacQuarrie, and Albert MacQuarrie. He was married to actress Helen MacKellar (1895 – 1966). He died in 1951 at the age of 77.

== Selected filmography ==
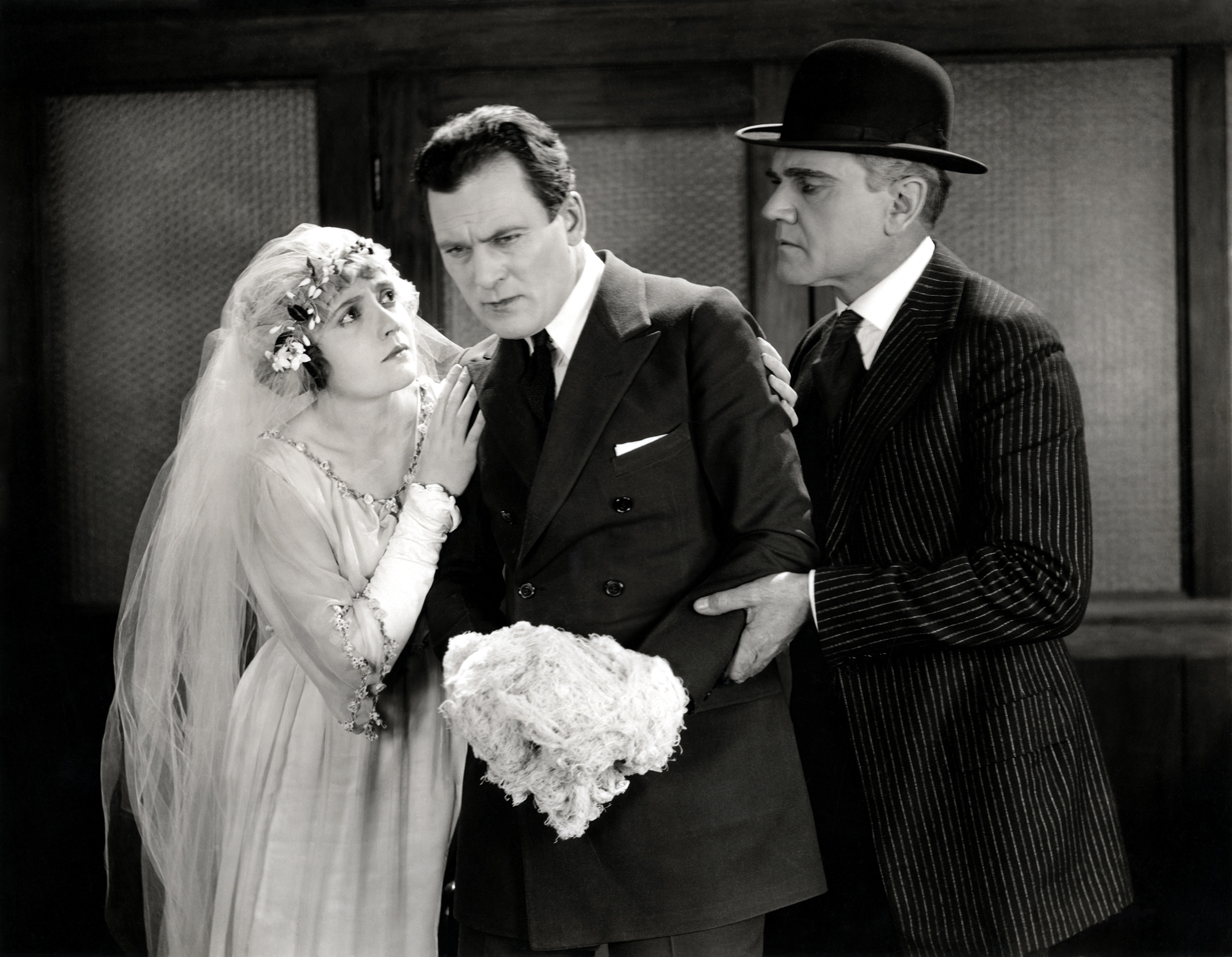
Lois Wilson, Thomas Meighan, and George MacQuarrie in The City of Silent Men (1921)

- The Eternal Sapho (1916) - Jack McCullough
- The Revolt (1916) - Dr. Goode
- The Heart of a Hero - Guy Fitzroy
- All Man (1916) - Gillette Barker
- A Hungry Heart (1917) - Marquis Henri de Sartorys
- The Social Leper (1917) - Henry Armstrong
- Forget Me Not (1917) - Sir Horace Welby
- The Stolen Paradise (1917) - Kenneth Brooks
- The Price of Pride (1917) - Ben Richardson
- The Iron Ring (1917) - Stephen Graves
- Betsy Ross (1917) - George Washington
- A Maid of Belgium (1917) - Roger Hudson
- Adventures of Carol (1917) - Col. Montgomery
- Her Hour (1917) - Ralph Christie
- The Tenth Case (1917) - Jerome Landis
- Diamonds and Pearls (1917) - Harrington Sr.
- Shall We Forgive Her? (1917)
- The Beautiful Mrs. Reynolds (1918) - George Washington
- The Gates of Gladness (1918) - Roger Leeds
- Wanted: A Mother (1918) - Dr. Homer
- Vengeance (1918) - Haven
- Stolen Orders (1918) - Adm. Gaveston
- The Interloper (1918) - Courtney Carvel
- The Cabaret (1918) - Stanley Sargent
- The Golden Wall (1918) - Rudolph Miller
- Joan of the Woods (1918) - Judge Philip Wentworth
- Heredity (1918) - Frank Graves
- Merely Players (1918) - Hollis Foster
- Appearance of Evil (1918) - Harold Brown
- Hitting the Trail (1918) - Reverend Thomas Roberts
- Love in a Hurry (1919) - George Templar
- The Bluffer (1919) - John Moran
- Mandarin's Gold (1919) - Geoffrey North
- Courage for Two (1919) - Douglas Sr.
- The Unveiling Hand (1919) - Bob Harding
- The Little Intruder (1919) - George Conklin
- The Social Pirate (1919) - Allen Hobington
- Love and the Woman (1919) - Grant Murdock
- Sacred Silence (1919) - Maj. Marston
- The Idol Dancer (1920) - Rev. Franklyn Blythe
- The Love Flower (1920) - Thomas Bevan
- The Whisper Market (1920) - Burke
- Uncle Sam of Freedom Ridge (1920) - Roger Blair
- The City of Silent Men (1921) - Mike Kearney
- Forbidden Love (1921) - Peter Van Zandt
- Find the Woman (1922) - Judge Walbrough
- A Virgin's Sacrifice (1922) - Sam Bellows
- Backbone (1923) - The Constable of France
- The Ragged Edge (1923) - McClintock
- The Hunchback of Notre Dame (1923) - (uncredited)
- Half-A-Dollar-Bill (1924) - Martin Webber
- The Rejected Woman (1924) - Samuel Du Prez
- The Street of Tears (1924) - Dan Weller
- The Hole in the Wall (1929) - Inspector
- Abraham Lincoln (1930) - Member of Lincoln's Cabinet (uncredited)
- King Kong (1933) - Police Captain (uncredited)
- A Bedtime Story (1933) - Henry Joudain
- Duck Soup (1933) - Judge #1 (uncredited)
- You're Telling Me! (1934) - Crabbe (uncredited)
- The Cat's-Paw (1934) - Assistant District Attorney (uncredited)
- The Mighty Barnum (1934) - Daniel Webster
- Life Returns (1935) - Judge
- Wings in the Dark (1935) - Crawford - Banke (uncredited)
- All the King's Horses (1935) - Prince Rumpfeffer (uncredited)
- Les Misérables (1935) - Doorman at Arras (uncredited)
- The Black Room (1935) - The Judge (uncredited)
- Call of the Wild (1935) - Mounted Policeman
- The Crusades (1935) - Captain of Templars (uncredited)
- Diamond Jim (1935) - Stockbroker (uncredited)
- Klondike Annie (1936) - Port Officer (uncredited)
- Desire (1936) - Clerk With Gun (scenes deleted)
- Robin Hood of El Dorado (1936) - Smithers (uncredited)
- Big Brown Eyes (1936) - Chief of Detectives (uncredited)
- The Border Patrolman (1936) - Jim Riker (uncredited)
- The Plainsman (1936) - Gen. Merritt
- The Last Train from Madrid (1937) - Driver (uncredited)
- High, Wide and Handsome (1937) - Peter's Man (uncredited)
- Souls at Sea (1937) - Doctor (uncredited)
- Lawless Valley (1938) - Tim Wade
- Hotel Imperial (1939) - Frightened Old Man (uncredited)
- Rulers of the Sea (1939) - Seaman (uncredited)
- Trail of the Vigilantes (1940) - Rancher (uncredited)
- Stardust on the Sage (1942) - Rancher Raymond (uncredited)
- The Sundown Kid (1942) - Rancher (uncredited)
- This Land Is Mine (1943) - Chief of Police (uncredited)
- Fourteen Hours (1951) - Rev. Dr. J.C. Parkinson (uncredited)
