= In the Days of Daniel Boone =

1923 film by William James Craft

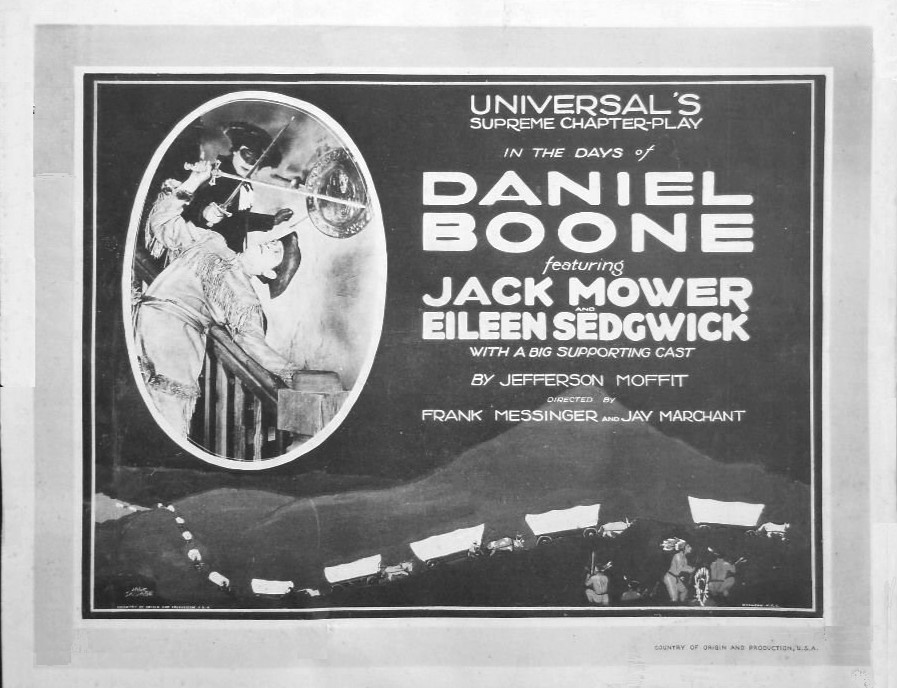
- Lobby card
- Directed by: William James Craft
- Written by: Jefferson Moffitt
- Starring: Charles Brinley; Jack Mower
- Distributed by: Universal Pictures
- Release date: June 25, 1923
- Running time: 15 episodes
- Country: United States
- Language: Silent (English intertitles)

In the Days of Daniel Boone is a 1923 American silent Western film serial directed by William James Craft. The 15-episode serial is considered to be lost. A trailer is included in the DVD More Treasures from American Film Archives, 1894-1931: 50 Films.

== Cast ==
- Charles Brinley as Daniel Boone
- Jack Mower as Jack Gordon
- Eileen Sedgwick as Susan Boone
- Ruth Royce as Claire de Voe
- Herschel Mayall as General Braddock
- Duke R. Lee as George Washington
- Albert J. Smith as Captain Charles Redmond
- Frank Farrington as Judge Henderson
- Jack Lewis as James Monroe

== Chapter titles ==
1. His Country's Need
2. At Sword's Point
3. Liberty or Death
4. Foiling the Regulators
5. Perilous Paths
6. Trapped
7. In the Hands of the Enemy
8. Over the Cliff
9. The Flaming Forest
10. Running the Gauntlet
11. The Wilderness Trail
12. The Fort in the Forest
13. The Boiling Springs
14. Chief Blackfish Attacks
15. Boone's Triumph

== See also ==
- List of film serials
- List of film serials by studio
