= Frank Farrington (actor) =

American actor

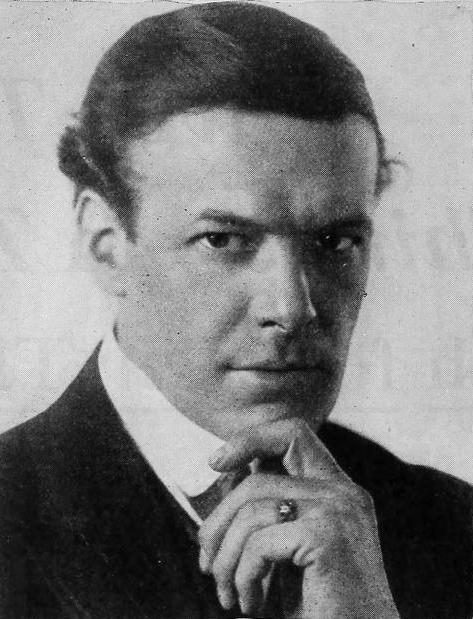
- Born: 8 July 1873; London, England
- Died: 27 May 1924 (aged 50); Los Angeles, California
- Occupation: Actor
- Years active: 1911–1924

Frank Farrington (8 July 1873 – 27 May 1924) was a England-born American silent film actor.

Farrington was born in Brixton, London, England.

Farrington died in Los Angeles, California, after a choking spell from a throat infection at the height of his acting career on 27 May 1924.

== Filmography ==
- The Man Who Fights Alone (1924) .... Struthers
- The Courtship of Miles Standish (1923) .... Isaac Allerton
- The Clean Up (1923) .... Amos Finderson
- In the Days of Daniel Boone (1923) .... Judge Henderson
- The Face at Your Window (1920) .... District Attorney
- The Scar (1919) .... Thaddeus Tabor
- To Hell with the Kaiser! (1918) .... General Pershing
- The Long Trail (1917) .... Undetermined role
- Pamela's Past (1916)
- The Cossack Whip (1916) .... Fedor Turov
- Through Turbulent Waters (1915) .... Paul Temple
- On the Brink of the Abyss (1915)
- A Man of Iron (1915)
- A Hatful of Trouble (1914) .... Wendall Wiggins
- Zudora (1914) .... Captain Radcliffe
- The Million Dollar Mystery (1914) .... Braine
- Was She Right in Forgiving Him? (1914)
- A Mohammedan Conspiracy (1914)
- The Strategy of Conductor 786 (1914)
- Beating Back (1914)
- A Debut in the Secret Service (1914)
- Repentance (1914)
- Pamela Congreve (1914)
- A Slight Mistake (1911)
