= The Man Who Fights Alone =

1924 film by Wallace Worsley

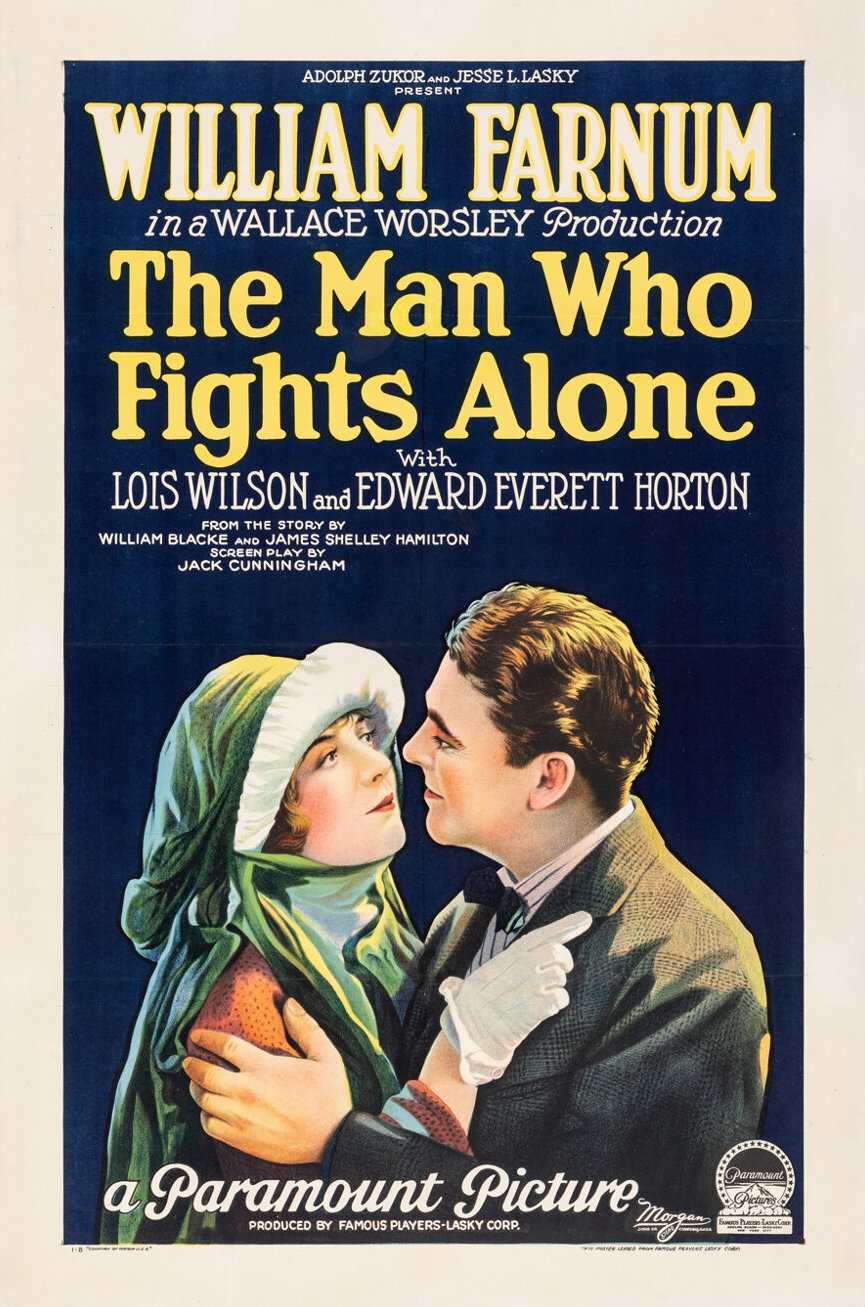
- Directed by: Wallace Worsley
- Written by: Jack Cunningham (screenplay)
- Based on: The Miracle of Hate by William Blacke and James Shelley Hamilton
- Produced by: Adolph Zukor; Jesse Lasky
- Starring: William Farnum; Lois Wilson
- Cinematography: L. Guy Wilky
- Distributed by: Paramount Pictures
- Release date: September 15, 1924
- Running time: 70 minutes
- Country: United States
- Language: Silent (English intertitles)

The Man Who Fights Alone is a 1924 American silent drama film produced by Famous Players–Lasky and distributed by Paramount Pictures. It was directed by Wallace Worsley and starred William Farnum and Lois Wilson.

== Cast ==
- William Farnum as John Marble
- Lois Wilson as Marion
- Edward Everett Horton as Bob Alten
- Lionel Belmore as Meggs
- Barlowe Borland as Mike O'Hara
- George Irving as Dr. Raymond
- Anne Shirley as Dorothy (credited as Dawn O'Day)
- Rose Tapley as Aunt Louise
- Frank Farrington as Struthers

== Preservation ==
With no copies of The Man Who Fights Alone located in any film archives it is a lost film.
