= The Man from Hell's River =

1922 film

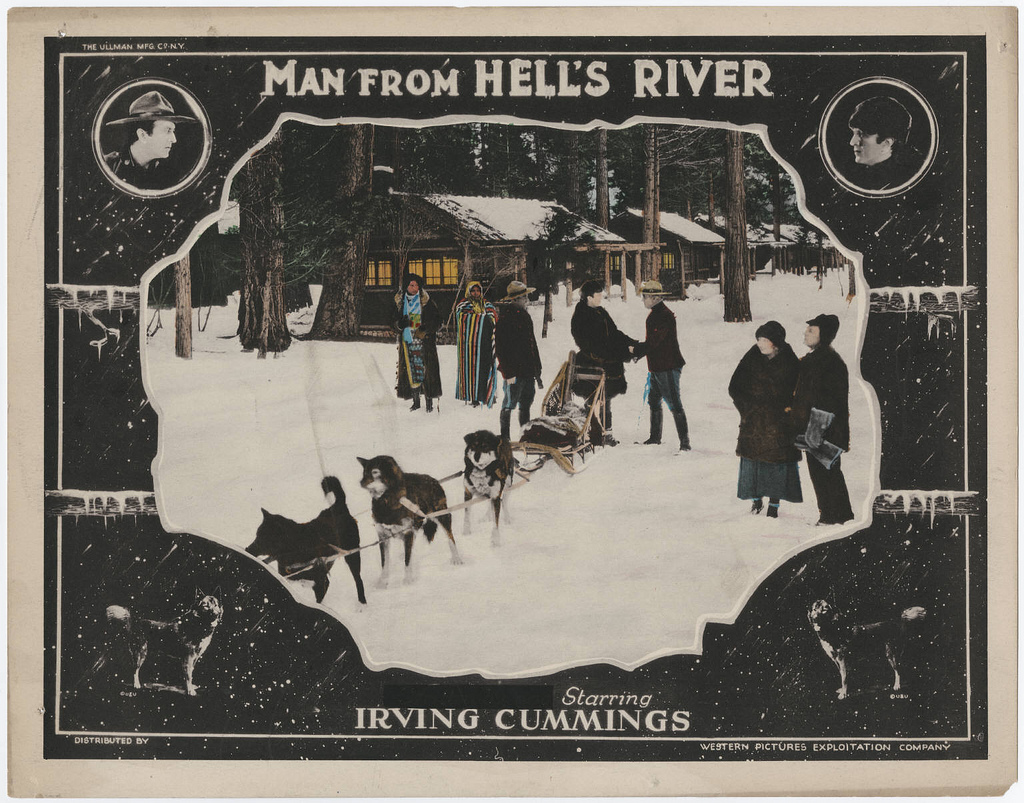
- Lobby card
- Directed by: Irving Cummings
- Written by: Irving Cummings
- Based on: "God of Her People" by James Oliver Curwood
- Produced by: Irving Cummings
- Starring: Irving Cummings; Eva Novak; Wallace Beery
- Cinematography: Conrad Wells
- Production company: Irving Cummings Productions
- Distributed by: Western Pictures Exploitation Company
- Release date: May 1922
- Running time: 5 reels
- Country: United States
- Languages: Silent; English intertitles

The Man from Hell's River, also known as simply Hell's River, is a 1922 American silent Western film starring Irving Cummings, Eva Novak, and Wallace Beery. The screenplay was written by Cummings based upon the story "God of Her People" by James Oliver Curwood, and directed by Cummings. The picture was notably the first of many (including a subsequent television series) for canine character Rin Tin Tin, a German Shepherd who replaced a truculent wolf originally slated to appear. The Man from Hell's River was produced by Irving Cummings Productions.

== Plot ==
As described in a film magazine, the story takes place in the woods of the Canadian northwest, where Corporal Pierre de Barre loves Mabella, the foster daughter of Lopente, and she loves him. Gaspard, The Wolf, holding over Lopente knowledge of a killing for which he would be arrested, demands Mabella. Lopente forces the young woman to marry Gaspard, telling her that he would be arrested and hanged otherwise. She does not tell Corporal Pierre why she has agreed to marry Gaspard, and he cannot fathom her reasons. Gaspard returns to seeing the women of doubtful virtue which formerly held his attentions. This irritates Pierre but he cannot do anything. The Priest tells Pierre of Mabella's story, and that she is not really Lopente's daughter. Mabella arouses Gaspard's jealousy and he sets out to kill Pierre. Sergeant McKenna and his deputy leave the post deserted, and Gaspard arrives and knocks Pierre down. Gaspard then flees with his wife. Pierre follows, and he and Gaspard have a fight out on the snow covered mountain. Pierre's wolf dog breaks his bounds and jumps on Gaspard, knocking him over the cliff. Pierre and Mabella are now free to marry.

== Cast ==
- Irving Cummings as Pierre de Barre
- Eva Novak as Mabella
- Wallace Beery as Gaspard, The Wolf
- Frank Whitson as Sergeant McKenna
- Robert Klein as Lopente
- William Herford as The Padre
- Rin Tin Tin
