= Playthings of Passion =

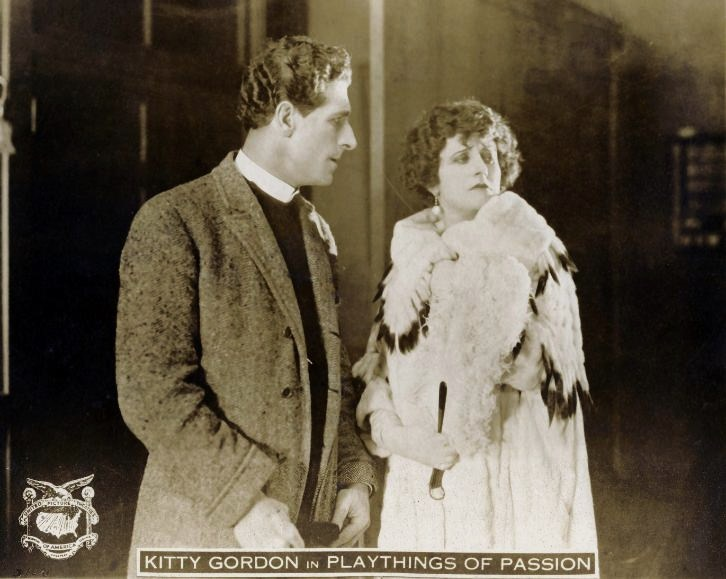
- W. Lawson Butt and Kitty Gordon
- Directed by: Wallace Worsley
- Written by: Jack Cunningham
- Based on: a story by William Anthony McGuire
- Produced by: Robert Brunton
- Starring: Kitty Gordon
- Cinematography: Clyde De Vinna
- Production company: United Picture Theatres of America
- Distributed by: United Picture Theatres of America
- Release date: June 8, 1919
- Running time: 5 reels
- Country: USA
- Language: Silent...English intertitles

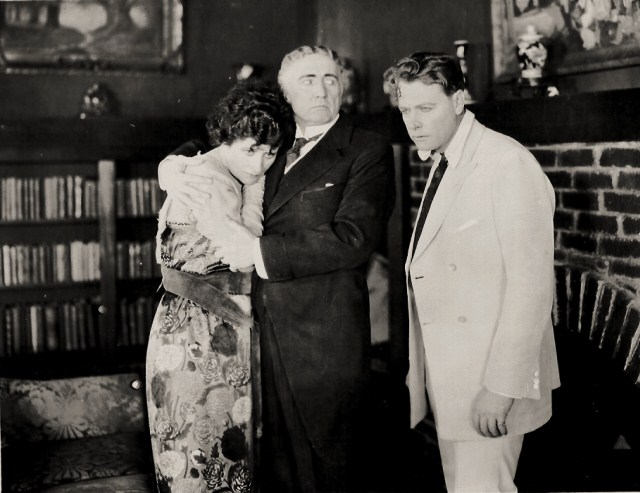
Kitty Gordon, ?unknown(probably William H. Tooker), Mahlon Hamilton.

Playthings of Passion is a lost 1919 drama film directed by Wallace Worsley and starring Kitty Gordon. It was produced and released by United Picture Theatres of America.

== Plot ==
As described by Moving Picture World, a young woman marries a man for his money, while she squanders his wealth on fine clothes and bridge, an evangelist of the slums calls on him for financial aid. The evangelist is invited to the rich man's home and is requested to try to interest his wife in his mission work for the purpose of diverting her mind from the frivolity. The experiment results in the woman and her spiritual guide falling in love. Called to task by the husband, the evangelist promises to cure the woman of her infatuation for him, and on her next visit to the mission he sets the scene for his own disgrace as a drunkard. The woman turns in disgust from the evangelist to her own husband, discovering that she has suddenly acquired an affection for the man she married.

== Cast ==
- Kitty Gordon - Helen Rowland
- Mahlon Hamilton - Henry Rowland
- Lawson Butt - John Sterling (*as W. Lawson Butt)
- Richard Rosson - Spiffy (*as Dick Rosson)

== Production ==
After two and a half months of filming, the film was completed in mid-March 1919 at the Robert Brunton Studios.

== Release ==
For the exhibition of Playthings of Passion in Pennsylvania, the title was ordered by the Pennsylvania Board of Censors to be changed to Playthings of Fate before it could be released. Copies of the film had to be quickly altered, and new posters, slides, and lobby displays had to be printed.

== Reception ==
Variety's review was positive, praising the "interesting" story and the actors for their work "everyone in the supporting cast did him, or her, self proud."

Wid's Daily gave the film a positive review as well, though criticized the scene where Helen Rowland is being embraced violently by her husband, as the reviewer found the way he held her reminiscent of contemporary films that "show the bestiality of the Germans." This scene drew the ire of the reviewer since "the spectator later shifts his sympathies with the husband, but it takes a lot of footage to dispel the effect of those early vulgar scenes."

Motion Picture News' review was negative, finding the film to be unable to "strike a sincere note" and "has more flaws than can be swallowed with the usual grains of salt."

Moving Picture World reviewer Margaret I. MacDonald gave the picture a negative review for being "totally without moral responsibility" and she found Kitty Gordon's acting to not measure up to what the role required. She also stated that the film portrayed a "fictitious idea of life" for depicting a brutal attack on Helen in the "supposedly respectable home of a wealthy American," and for the same woman later in the film to be doing charity work while wearing fur and diamonds.
