= The City of Silent Men =

1921 film

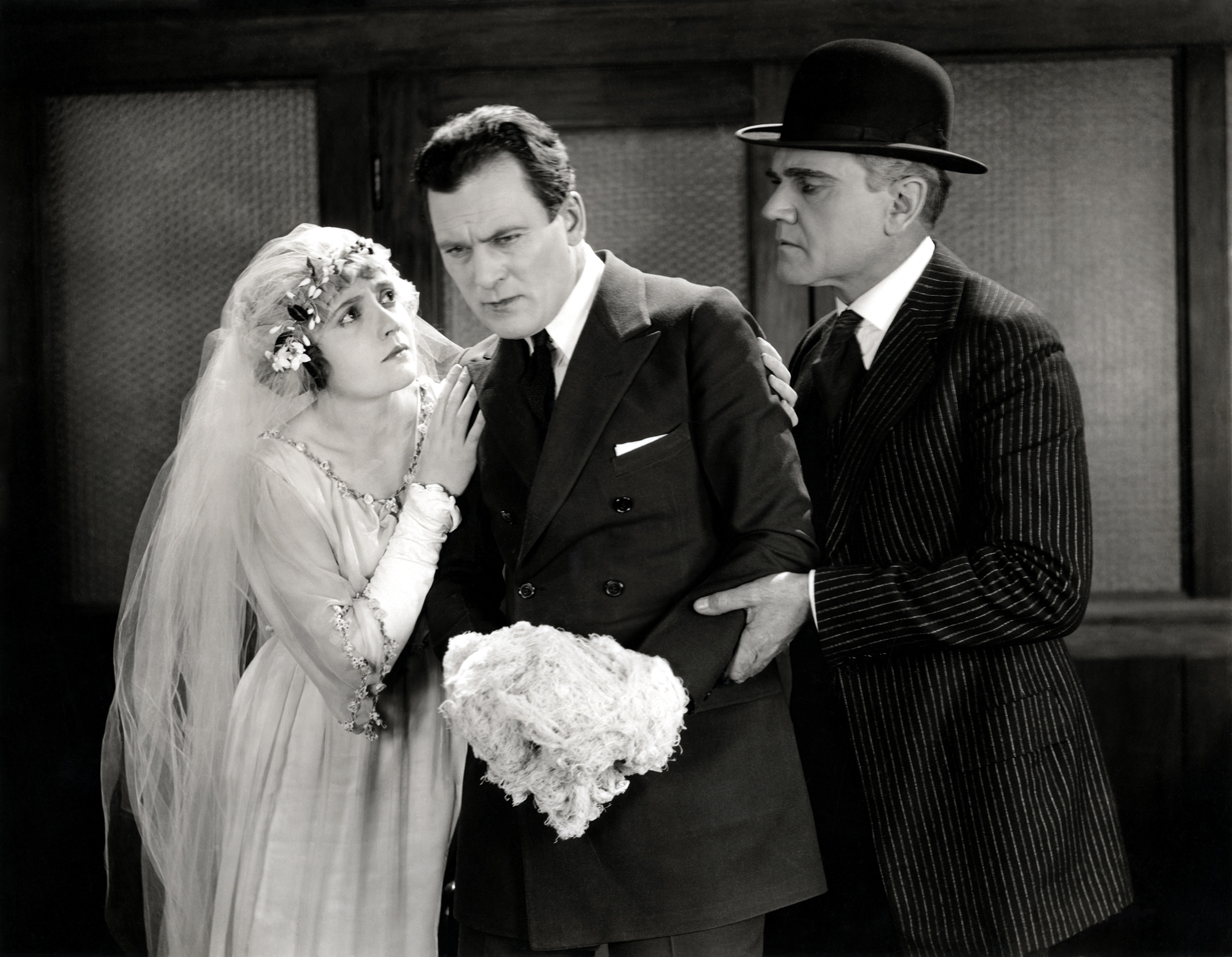
- left to right: Lois Wilson, Thomas Meighan, George MacQuarrie
- Directed by: Tom Forman
- Written by: Frank Condon (scenario)
- Based on: The Quarry by John A. Moroso
- Produced by: Adolph Zukor; Jesse Lasky
- Starring: Thomas Meighan; Lois Wilson
- Cinematography: Harry Perry
- Distributed by: Paramount Pictures
- Release date: May 1, 1921
- Running time: 6 reels; 6,326 feet
- Country: United States
- Language: Silent (English intertitles)

The City of Silent Men is a lost 1921 American silent drama film produced by Famous Players–Lasky and distributed by Paramount Pictures. It was directed by Tom Forman and starred Thomas Meighan and Lois Wilson.

== Plot ==
Based upon a summary in a film publication, Jim Montogmery escapes from Sing Sing prison and goes west to start a new life under the name Jack Nelson. He becomes superintendent of a large mill and falls in love with the owner's daughter Molly. He tells her of his past life and she believes that he is innocent, so they are married. Prison officials pardon Old Bill, who planned Jim's escape, as bait in their attempt to recapture Jim. Detective Mike Kearney finally lands his man but Jim places his fingers in the mill machinery to spoil the tell-tale fingerprints. Later Old Bill wins a confession from the crook that actually did the crime for which Jim was sentenced, leading to a pardon for Jim.

== Cast ==
- Thomas Meighan as Jim Montogmery
- Lois Wilson as Molly Bryant
- Kate Bruce as Mrs. Montgomery
- Paul Everton as Old Bill
- George MacQuarrie as Mike Kearney
- Guy Oliver as Mr. Bryant
