= The Whisper Market =

1920 film

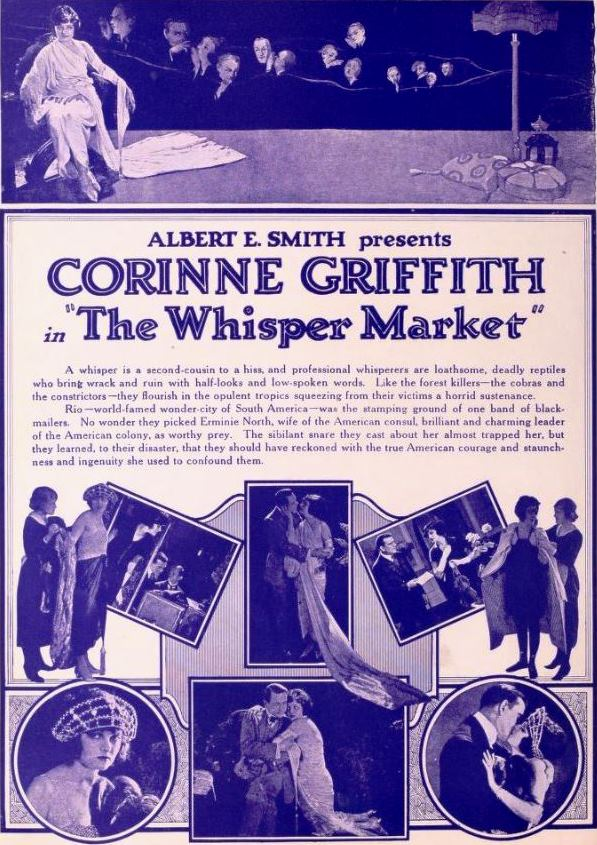
- Directed by: George L. Sargent
- Written by: C. Graham Baker; W.E. Scutt
- Produced by: Albert E. Smith
- Starring: Corinne Griffith; George MacQuarrie; Eulalie Jensen
- Cinematography: Charles J. Davis
- Production company: Vitagraph Company of America
- Distributed by: Vitagraph Company of America
- Release date: September 13, 1920
- Running time: 50 minutes
- Country: United States
- Languages: Silent; English intertitles

The Whisper Market is a 1920 American silent drama film directed by George L. Sargent and starring Corinne Griffith, George MacQuarrie and Eulalie Jensen.

== Cast ==
- Corinne Griffith as Erminie North
- George Howard as Basil North
- George MacQuarrie as Burke
- James O'Neill as Hobson
- Eulalie Jensen as Juliet Saltmarsh
- Howard Truesdale as George Saltmarsh
- Jacob Kingsbury as Doucer

== Bibliography ==
- Connelly, Robert B. The Silents: Silent Feature Films, 1910-36, Volume 40, Issue 2. December Press, 1998.
- Munden, Kenneth White. The American Film Institute Catalog of Motion Pictures Produced in the United States, Part 1. University of California Press, 1997.
