= The Unveiling Hand =

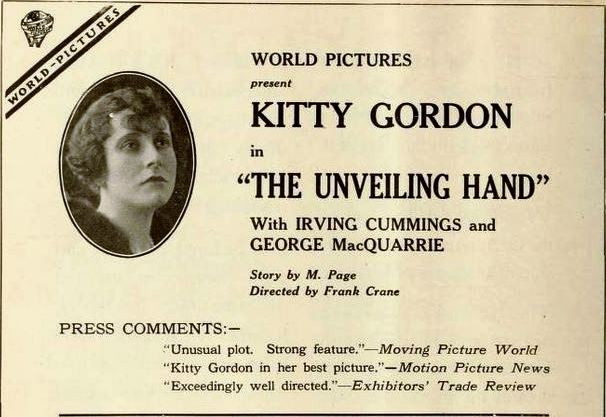
- ad
- Directed by: Frank Hall Crane
- Written by: Clara Beranger
- Based on: a story by Mann Page and Izola Forrester
- Produced by: World Film Company
- Starring: Kitty Gordon
- Cinematography: Max Schneider
- Distributed by: World Film Company
- Release date: March 17, 1919
- Running time: 5 reels
- Country: USA
- Language: Silent..English titles

The Unveiling Hand is a 1919 silent film drama directed by Frank Hall Crane and starring Kitty Gordon. It was produced and distributed by World Film Company.

== Cast ==
- Kitty Gordon - Margaret Ellis
- Frederick Warde - Judge Ellis
- Irving Cummings - Philip Bellamy
- George MacQuarrie - Bob Harding
- Reginald Carrington - Col. Harding
- Margaret Seddon - Mrs. Bellamy
- Warren Cook - Dr. Wallace
- Tony Merlo - Hassan (*as Anthony Merlo)

== Preservation ==
With no prints of The Unveiling Hand located in any film archives, it is considered a lost film.
