= Vera, the Medium =

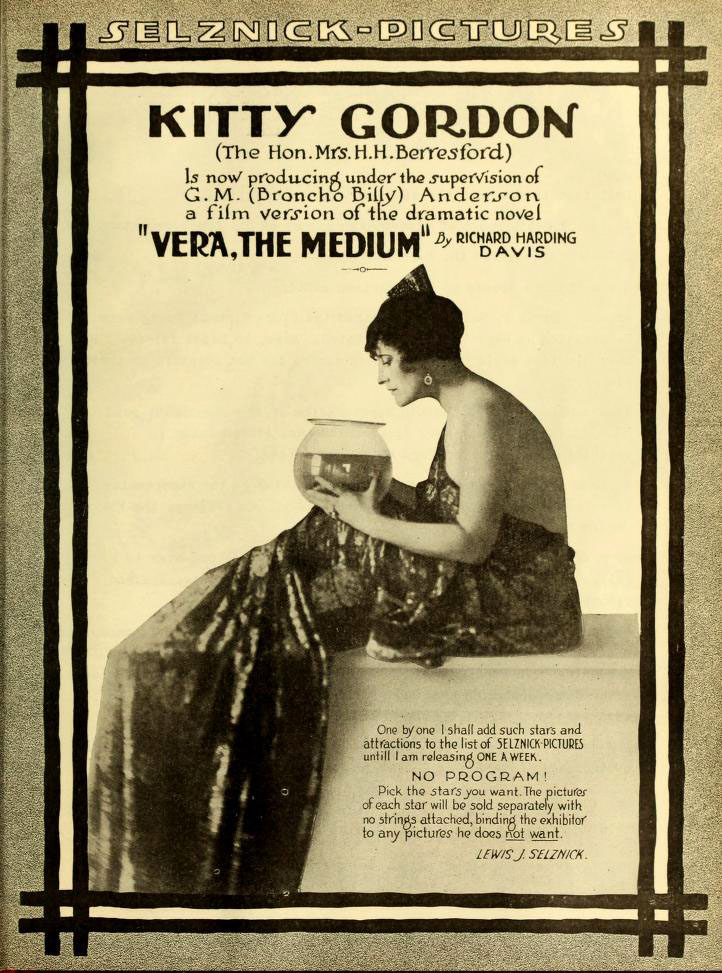
- Promotional poster
- Directed by: G. M. Anderson
- Written by: Richard Harding Davis (novel, scenario)
- Produced by: Lewis J. Selznick; Kitty Gordon
- Starring: Kitty Gordon; Lowell Sherman
- Production company: Essanay Film Manufacturing Co.
- Distributed by: Selznick Pictures
- Release date: January 4, 1917
- Running time: 5 reels
- Country: United States
- Languages: Silent; English intertitles

Vera, the Medium is a lost 1917 American silent drama film directed by G. M. Anderson and starring Kitty Gordon. It was produced by Gordon and Lewis J. Selznick who released through his Select Pictures.

== Cast ==
- Kitty Gordon as Vera
- Lowell Sherman as Robert Sterling
- Walter Hitchcock as Herbert Carlton
- Joyce Fair as Carlton's Daughter
- Frank Goldsmith as Albert Hastings
- Grace Blow as Carlton's Wife
- Harris Gordon as Carlton's Son

== Preservation ==
With no holdings located in archives, Vera, the Medium is considered a lost film.
