= Adele (film) =

1919 film

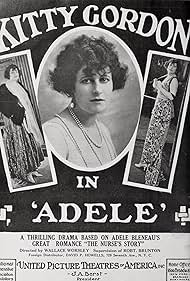
- Directed by: Wallace Worsley
- Written by: Jack Cunningham
- Based on: a novel The Nurse's Story: In Which Reality Meets Romance by Adele Bleneau
- Produced by: United Picture Theatres of America Inc. Robert Brunton
- Starring: Kitty Gordon
- Cinematography: Clyde De Vinna
- Distributed by: United Picture Theatres of America Inc.
- Release date: January 26, 1919
- Running time: 6 reels
- Country: USA
- Language: Silent...English titles

Adele is a lost 1919 American silent drama film directed by Wallace Worsley and starring Kitty Gordon. This was an independent production.

== Cast ==
- Kitty Gordon – Adele Bleneau
- Mahlon Hamilton – Capt. Fraser
- Wedgwood Nowell – Count von Schulling
- Joseph J. Dowling – Dr. Bleneau

== Preservation ==
With no holdings located in archives, Adele is considered a lost film.
