= Mandarin's Gold =

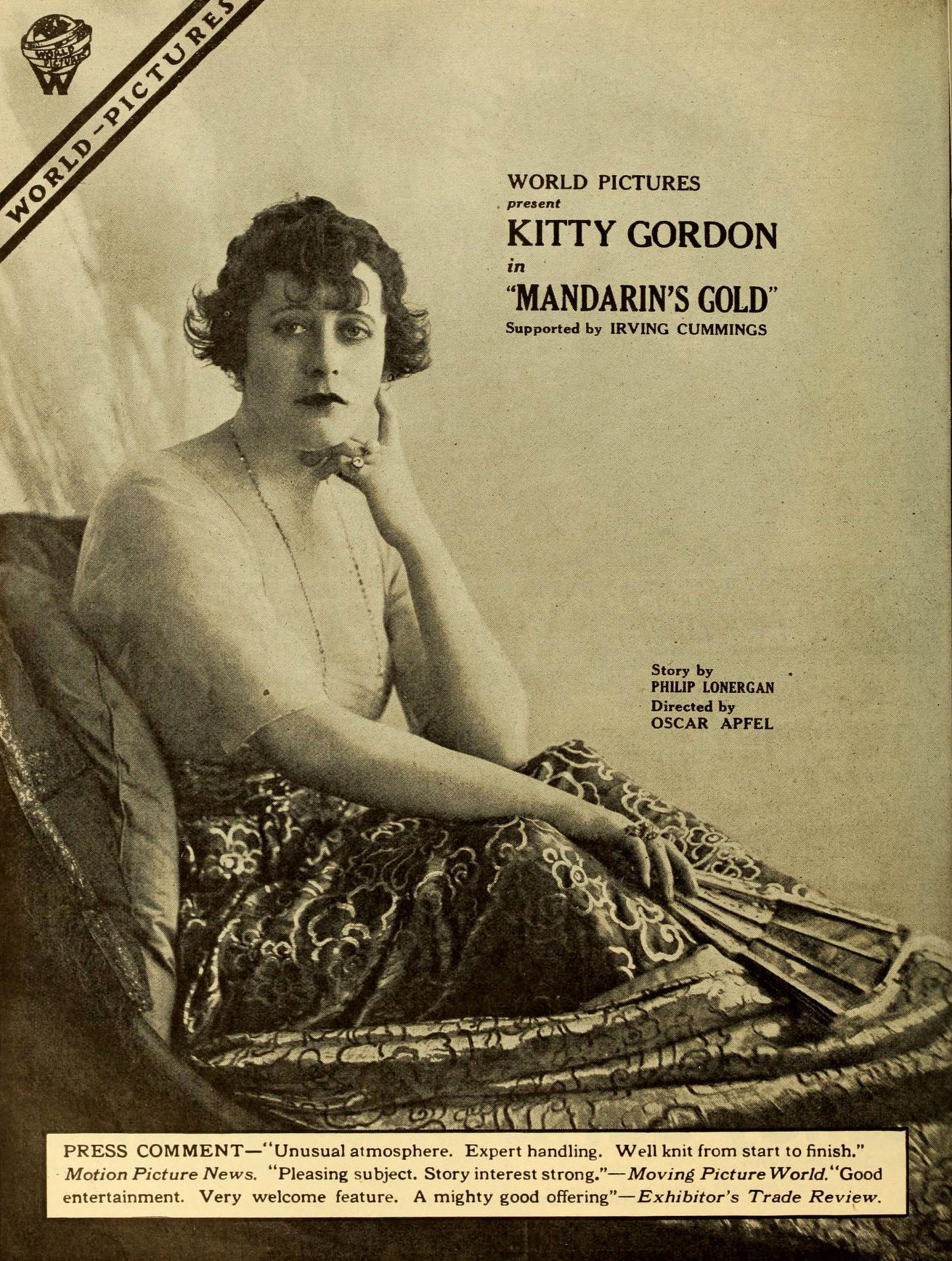
- Advertisement in Moving Picture World
- Directed by: Oscar Apfel
- Written by: Lucien Hubbard; Philip Lonergan
- Starring: Kitty Gordon
- Cinematography: Lucien Tainguy
- Production company: World Film Company
- Distributed by: World Film Company
- Release date: February 10, 1919
- Running time: 5 reels
- Country: United States
- Languages: Silent film (English intertitles)

Mandarin's Gold is a 1919 American silent drama film directed by Oscar Apfel and starring Kitty Gordon and Irving Cummings.

== Cast ==
- Kitty Gordon as Betty Cardon
- Irving Cummings as Blair Cardon
- George MacQuarrie as Geoffrey North
- Marguerite Gale as Susan Pettigrew
- Veronica Lee as Cherry Blossom
- Warner Oland as Li Hsun
- Joseph Lee as Wu Sing
- Marion Barney as Mrs. Stone
- Tony Merlo as Bertie Standish
- Charles Fang
- Alice Lee

== Reception ==
Variety's review was mixed, finding that the story was nothing new, but that the cast was "unusually good" and the settings were "handsome."

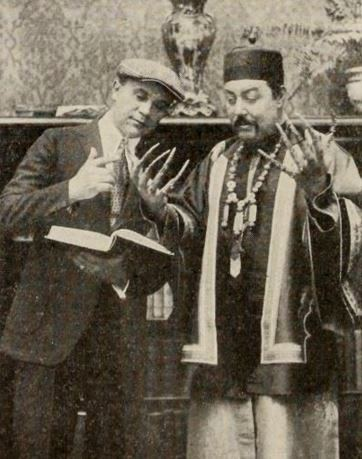
Oscar C. Apfel and Warner Oland on set

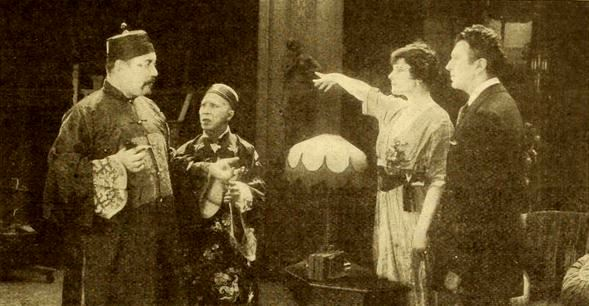
Warner Oland, an unidentified actor, Kitty Gorden, Irving Cummings

Moving Picture World's Robert C. McElravy gave the film a positive review, and found it to be a "pleasing subject."

== Preservation ==
It is unknown whether the film survives as no copies have been located, likely lost.
