= The Interloper =

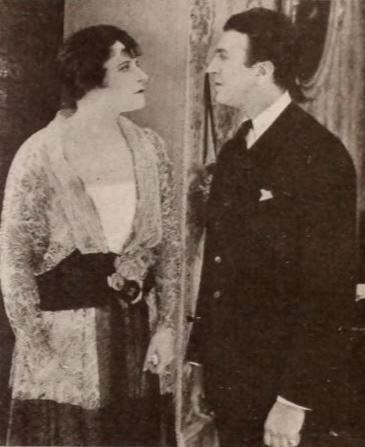
- Kitty Gordon and Irving Cummings
- Directed by: Oscar Apfel
- Written by: Wallace Clifton
- Based on: a story by Clara Beranger
- Produced by: William A. Brady
- Starring: Kitty Gordon
- Cinematography: Lucien Tainguy
- Distributed by: World Film Company
- Release date: June 3, 1913
- Running time: 50 minutes
- Country: United States
- Language: Silent...English intertitles

The Interloper is a 1918 silent feature film directed by Oscar Apfel and starring Kitty Gordon.

== Cast ==
- Kitty Gordon - Jane Cameron
- Irving Cummings - Paul Whitney
- Warren Cook - Whitney Pere
- Isabel Berwin - Mrs. Whitney
- June Blackman - Aunt Patricia
- Frank Mayo - Edmond Knapp
- George MacQuarrie - Courtney Carvel
- Anthony Byrd - Eph
- I. Quong - Kamoto
- Tom Cameron - the Whitney's Butler

== Preservation ==
With no prints of The Interloper located in any film archives, it is considered a lost film.
