= Stolen Orders =

1918 film

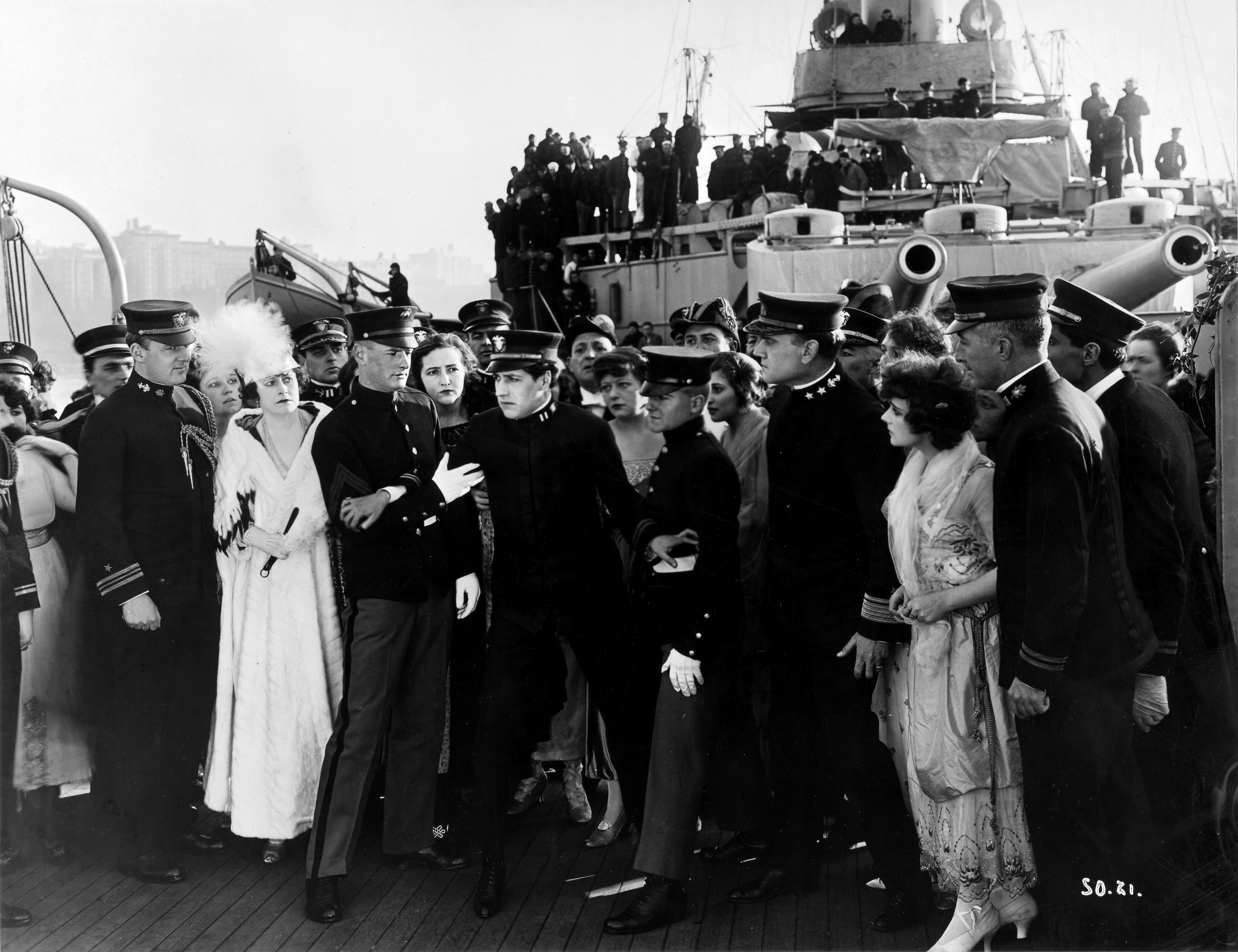
- Montagu Love (center) in Stolen Orders
- Directed by: Harley Knoles; George Kelson
- Written by: Charles Whittaker
- Based on: the play Sealed Orders by Cecil Raleigh and Henry Hamilton
- Produced by: William A. Brady
- Starring: Kitty Gordon; Montagu Love
- Cinematography: René Guissart; Jacques Monteran(fr)
- Distributed by: World Film
- Release date: June 2, 1918
- Running time: 80 minutes
- Country: USA
- Languages: Silent, English titles

Stolen Orders is a lost 1918 silent propaganda film directed by Harley Knoles and starring Kitty Gordon and Montagu Love.

== Cast ==
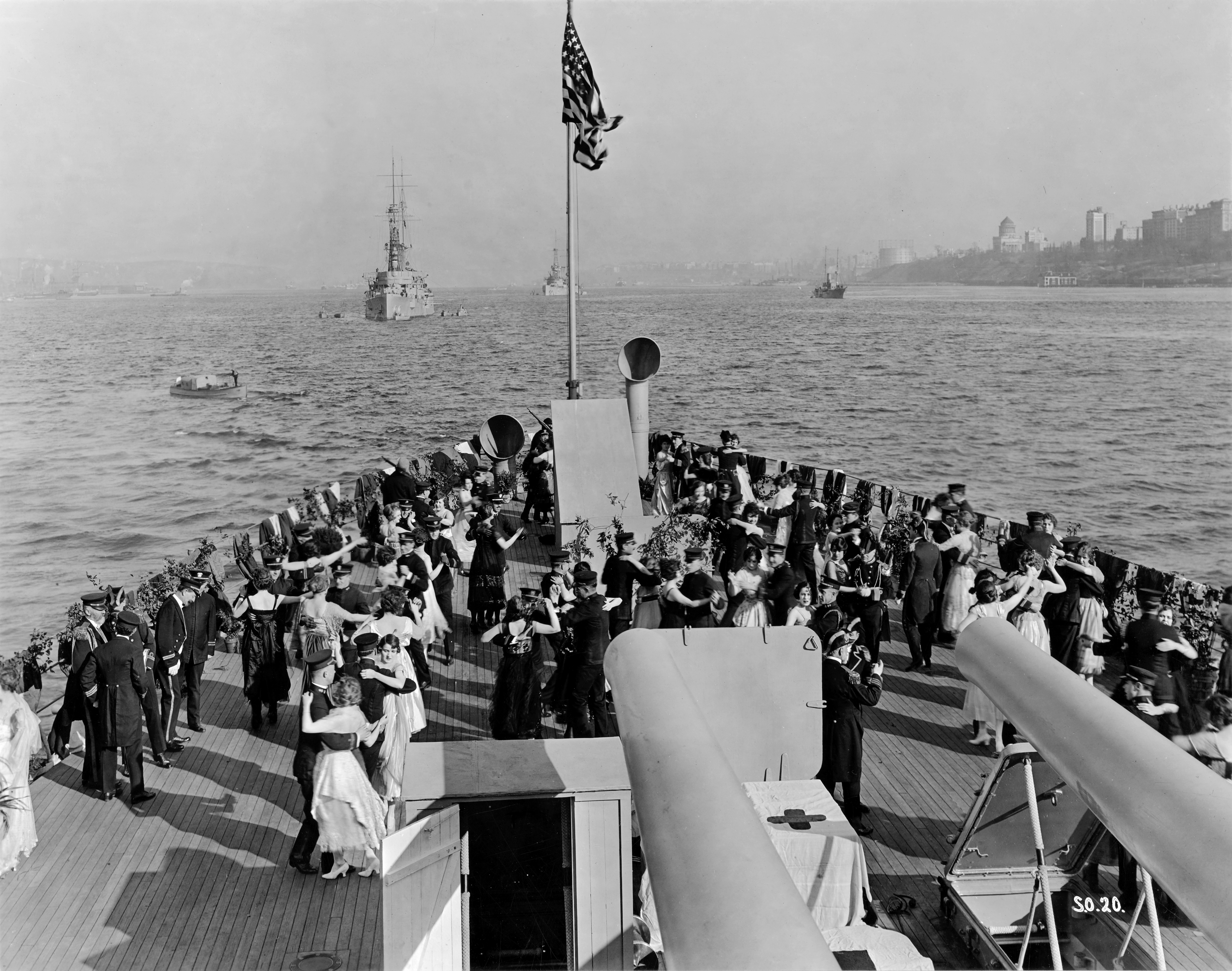
Promotional still for Stolen Orders

- Montagu Love – John Le Page
- Kitty Gordon – Felicia Gaveston
- June Elvidge – Ruth Le Page
- Carlyle Blackwell – Lt. Dennis Gaveston
- Madge Evans – Ruth Le Page, as a child
- George MacQuarrie – Admiral Gaveston
- Frank Leigh – Baron Kurdman
- Edward Elkas – Maurice Levonshon
- Robert Barring – Caversham
- Dore Davidson – Mendel Hart
- Philip W. Masi – Bertie Hart (*Philip Masse)
- Walter Greene – Joe Allen
- Marie Pagano – Mame
- J. Gunnis Davis – Bill Cory
- Jack Newton – Baron Charlier
