= Diamonds and Pearls (film) =

1917 film directed by George Archainbaud

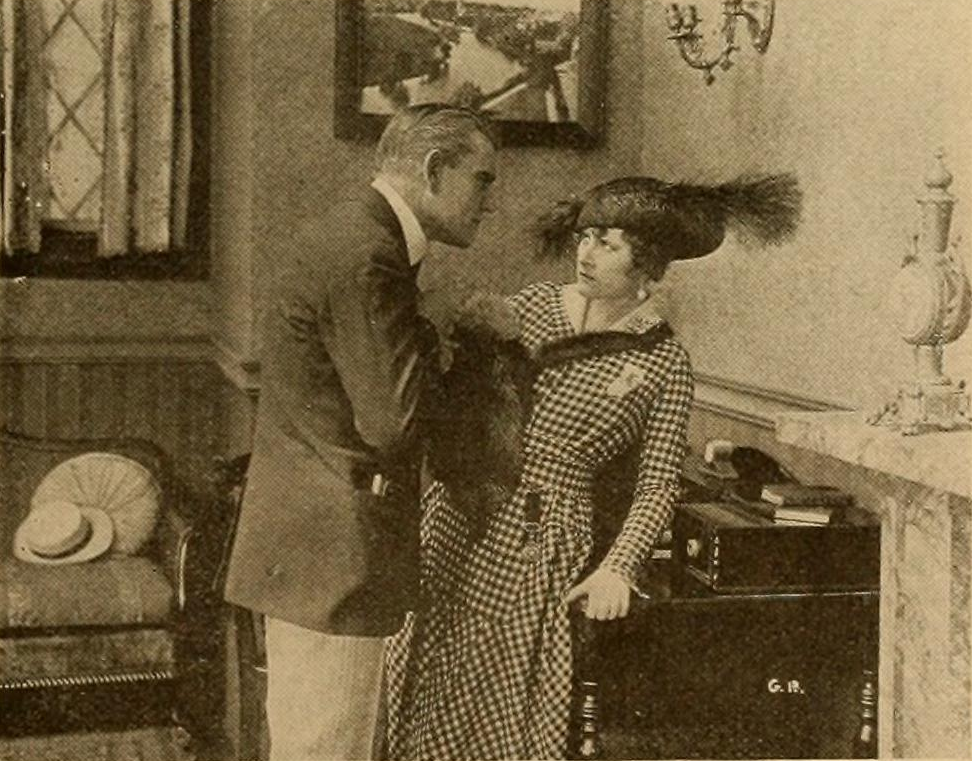
- Directed by: George Archainbaud
- Written by: Adeline Leitzbach
- Produced by: William A. Brady
- Starring: Kitty Gordon; Milton Sills; George MacQuarrie
- Cinematography: Philip Hatkin
- Production company: Peerless Productions
- Distributed by: World Film
- Release date: December 31, 1917
- Running time: 5 reels
- Country: United States
- Languages: Silent; English intertitles

Diamonds and Pearls is a 1917 American silent drama film directed by George Archainbaud and starring Kitty Gordon, Milton Sills, and George MacQuarrie.

== Plot ==
According to a film magazine, " The daughter of a proud but impoverished Southern colonel, Violetta D'Arcy, throws over Jack Harrington because she believes he is poor and marries Robert Van Ellstrom, a man of wealth, who can purchase the jewels she craves.

Although given a generous allowance, Violetta loses so heavily at bridge that she is forced to secretly pawn her sister-in-law's necklace. Being still pressed for money, she accepts a check from young Harrington's father, in return for an introduction into society for himself and wife. Later on he attempts to take advantage of the transaction, but Violetta's husband appears on the scene and the two men come to blows. Young Harrington, who is known to Violetta as Jack Rand, also becomes involved. His father tries to shoot Van Ellstrom, wounds his own son and, thinking he has killed him. puts a bullet through his own heart. Fearing the consequences of her folly Violetta is afraid to face her husband, but he goes to her and forgives her, when he realizes that she is repentant and has learned to love him."

== Cast ==
- Kitty Gordon as Violetta D'Arcy
- Milton Sills as Robert Van Ellstrom
- Curtis Cooksey as Jack Harrington
- George MacQuarrie as Harrington Sr.
- Henrietta Simpson as Mrs. Harrington
- Katherine Johnston as Margaret Van Ellstrom
- Frances Miller as Mammy Dinah
- Edmund Burns as John Leffingwell Jr.
- Charles Dungan as John Leffingwell Sr.

== Bibliography ==
- Parish, James Robert; Pitts, Michael R. (1974). Film Directors: A Guide to Their American Films. Metuchen, NJ: Scarecrow Press. ISBN 978-0-8108-0752-5.
