= The Wasp (1918 film) =

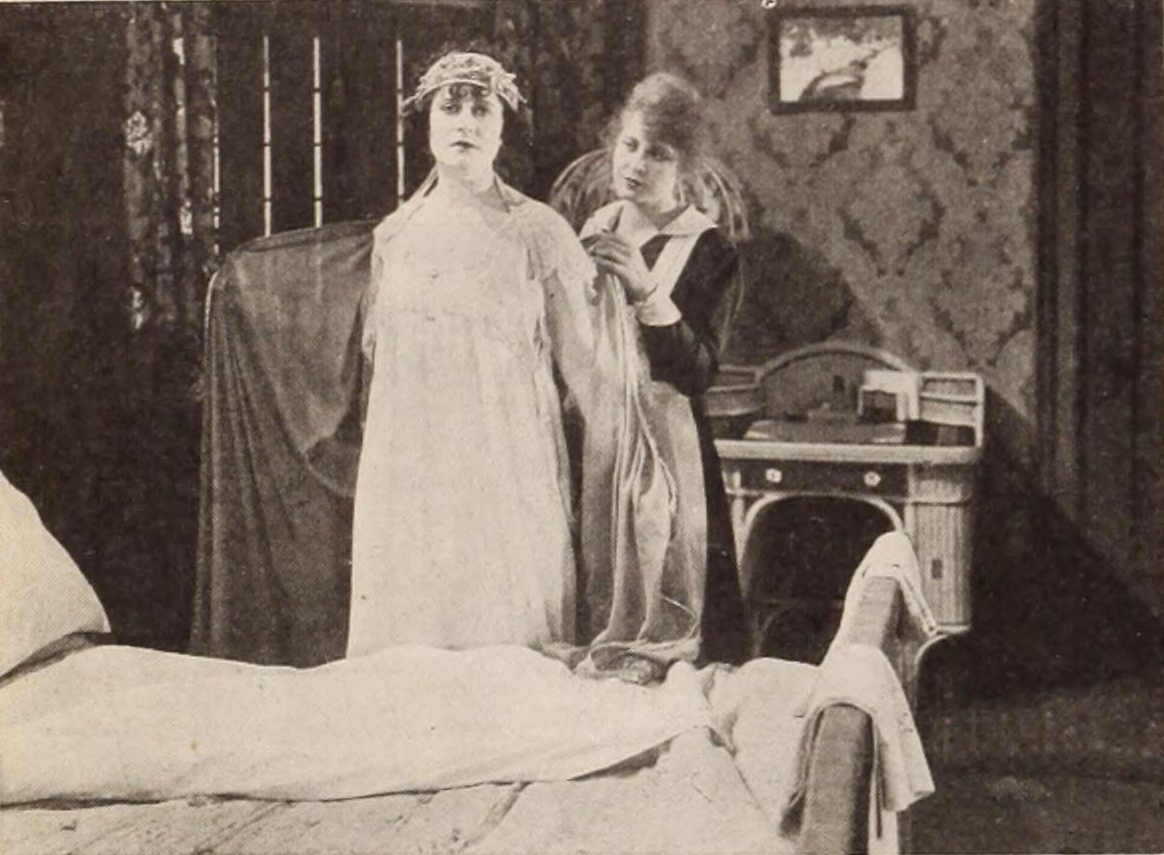
- Kitty Gordon and Hazel Washburn in a publicity still
- Directed by: Lionel Belmore
- Written by: Willard Mack (story)
- Produced by: William A. Brady
- Starring: Kitty Gordon
- Cinematography: Louis Ostland
- Production company: World Film Company
- Distributed by: World Film Company
- Release date: March 11, 1918
- Running time: 5 reels
- Country: USA
- Language: Silent...English intertitles

The Wasp is a lost 1918 American silent comedy drama film directed by Lionel Belmore and starring stage star Kitty Gordon. It was produced by William A. Brady and distributed by World Film Company.

== Plot ==
According to a film magazine, "Grace Culver has been dubbed "The Wasp" because of her stinging tongue and clever satire. Her father is desirous of having her marry Kane Putman, but when Grace learns the true nature of the man, she rebels and leaves home. Harry Cortland, who first saw Grace at a football game, is determined to make her his wife. He becomes her chauffeur and when angry strikers from her father's factories, inspired by a German agent, Carl Wagner, attack their machine, Cortland tries to save her. However, they are made prisoners. Grace manages to get word to soldiers. She and Cortland escape into a tunnel where they are trapped when the German agents set off a bomb. Grace learns that Harry Cortland is a millionaire's son and in love with her and after their rescue by American soldiers, they make a hasty trip to a nearby parsonage."

== Cast ==
- Kitty Gordon as Grace Culver
- Rockliffe Fellowes as Harry Cortland/Tim Purcell
- Charles Gerry as John Culver (*note: this may be Charles Cherry)
- Zadee Burbank as Mrs. Culver (*as Sadee Burbank)
- William Calhoun as Mr. Cortland
- Edward Roseman as Jackson Devereaux
- Victor Kennard as Kane Putnam
- Lionel Belmore as Brazsos
- Hazel Washburn as Miller, the Maid
- Edmund Burns as Harry's Roommate (*as Edward Burns)
