= The Crucial Test =

1916 film by John Ince

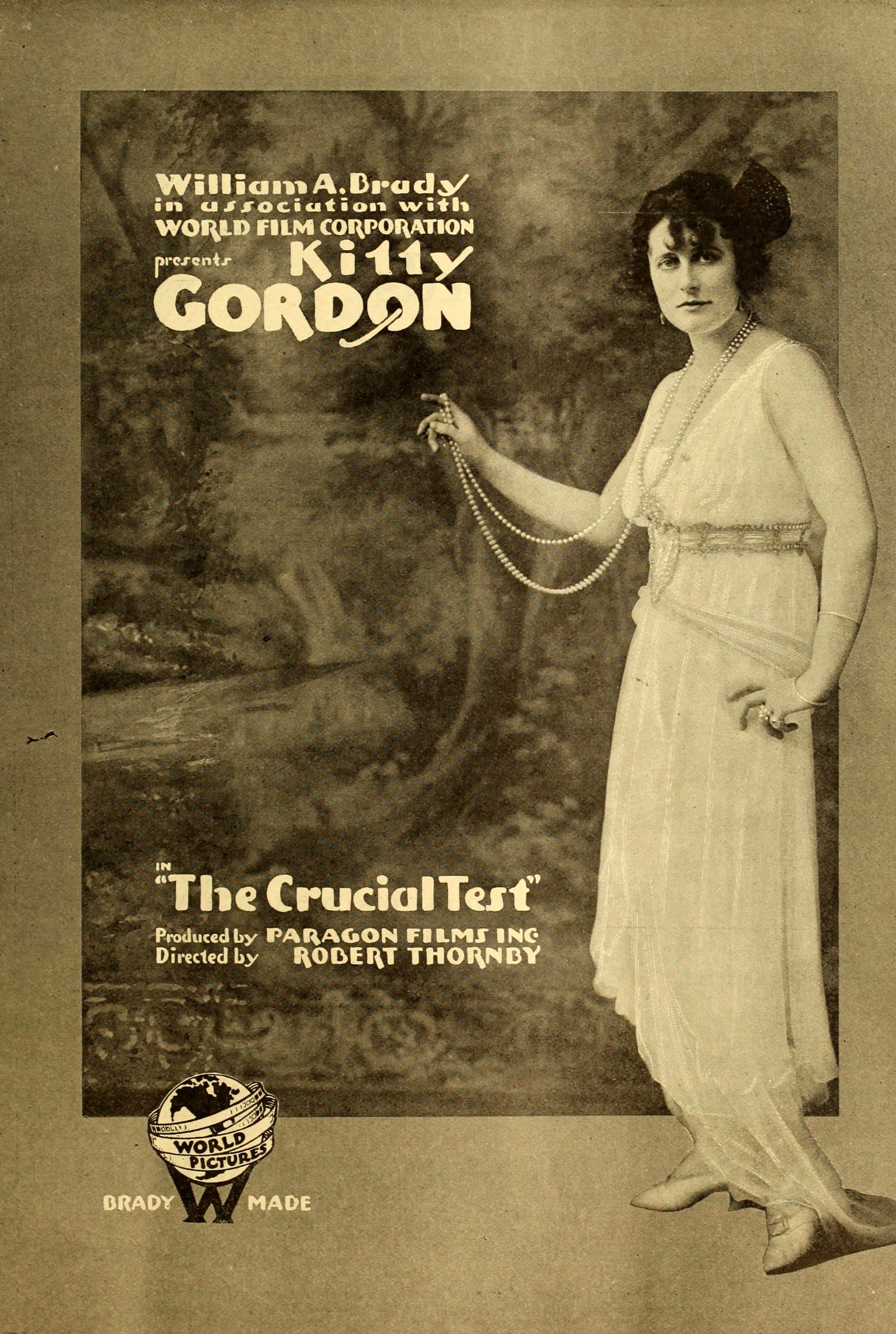
- Advertisement
- Directed by: John Ince; Robert Thornby
- Written by: Frances Marion
- Produced by: William A. Brady
- Starring: Kitty Gordon
- Production company: Paragon Films
- Distributed by: World Film Corporation
- Release date: July 3, 1916
- Running time: 5 reels
- Country: United States
- Language: Silent (English intertitles)

The Crucial Test is a lost 1916 American silent drama film directed by John Ince and Robert Thornby. It stars Kitty Gordon and was distributed by the World Film Corporation.

== Cast ==
- Kitty Gordon as Thanya
- Niles Welch as Vance Holden
- J. Herbert Frank as Grand Duke Alexander Bagroff
- William W. Cohill as Boris
- Winifred Harris as Princess
- Adolphe Menjou as Count Nicolai

== Preservation ==
With no holdings located in archives, The Crucial Test is considered a lost film.
