= Her Maternal Right =

1916 film by John Ince

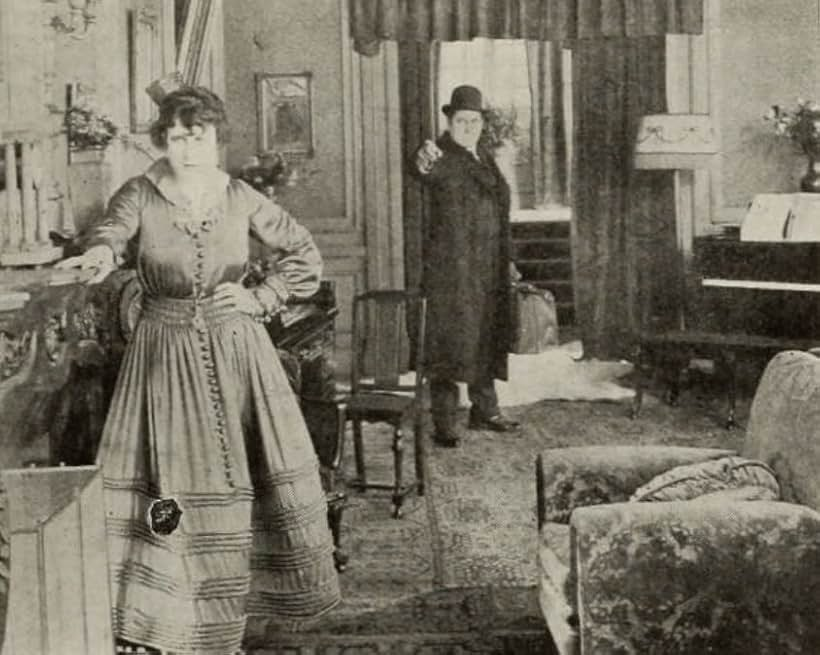
- Directed by: John Ince; Robert Thornby
- Written by: Willard Mack
- Starring: Kitty Gordon
- Production company: Paragon Films
- Distributed by: World Film Corporation
- Release date: May 8, 1916
- Running time: 5 reels
- Country: USA
- Language: Silent..English titles

Her Maternal Right is lost American silent melodrama film directed by John Ince and Robert Thornby and stars Kitty Gordon. World Film Corporation distributed.

== Cast ==
- Kitty Gordon - Nina Seasbury
- Zena Keefe - Mary Winslow
- George Relph - Emory Townsend
- Frank Evans - Amos Nelson
- Warner Richmond

== Preservation ==
With no holdings located in archives, Her Maternal Right is considered a lost film.
