= Forget Me Not (1917 film) =

American silent film

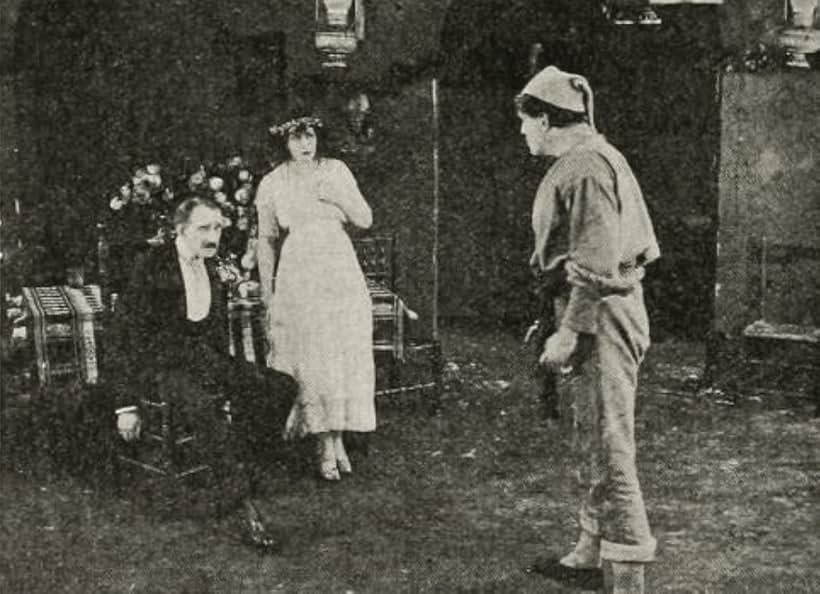
- Film still
- Directed by: Emile Chautard
- Written by: Frances Marion
- Based on: play Forget-Me-Not by Herman Merivale and F. C. Grove, c. 1879
- Produced by: William A. Brady; World Film Company; Peerless
- Starring: Kitty Gordon; Montagu Love
- Cinematography: Lucien Tainguy
- Distributed by: World Film Company
- Release date: April 16, 1917
- Running time: 5 reels
- Country: USA
- Language: Silent

Forget Me Not is a 1917 lost American silent drama film directed by Emile Chautard and starring Kitty Gordon.

== Cast ==
- Kitty Gordon as Stefanie Paoli
- Montagu Love as Gabriel Barrato/Benedetto Barrato
- Alec B. Francis as Marquis de Mohrivart
- George MacQuarrie as Sir Horace Welby
- James Furey as Sir Donald Verney
- Norma Phillips as Rose Verney
- Lillian Herbert as Alice Verney
- Henrietta Simpson as Mrs. Foley

== Preservation ==
With no holdings located in archives, Forget Me Not is considered a lost film.
