= The Beloved Adventuress =

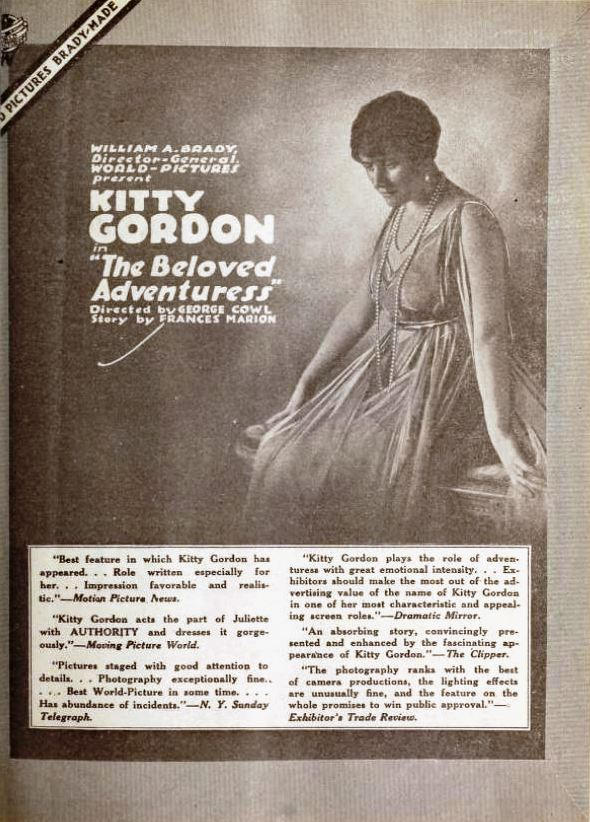
- Film's promotion in Exhibitors Herald
- Directed by: William A. Brady; George Cowl (uncredited); Edmund Lawrence(uncredited)
- Written by: Frances Marion(screen story, scenario)
- Produced by: World Film Company
- Starring: Kitty Gordon
- Cinematography: Lucien Tainguy
- Distributed by: World Film Company
- Release date: July 16, 1917
- Running time: 50 minutes; 5 reels
- Country: USA
- Language: Silent...English intertitles

The Beloved Adventuress is a lost 1917 American silent drama film directed by William A. Brady, George Cowl and Edmund Lawrence. It stars Kitty Gordon and was scripted by Frances Marion. It was distributed by World Film Company.

== Cast ==
- Kitty Gordon - Juliette La Monde
- Jack Drumier - Robert Nicholson
- Inez Shannon - Mrs. Nicholson
- Madge Evans - Francin, age 7
- Lillian Cook - Francine, age 17
- Robert Forsyth - Dr. Stewart
- Edward Elkas - Jan Moritz
- Robert Paton Gibbs - Critic (*as R. Paton Gibbs)
- Frederick Truesdell - Morgan Grant
- William Sherwood - Philip Stewart
- Pinna Nesbit - Martha Grant
- Katharine Johnston - Amy Barker

== Preservation ==
With no holdings located in archives, The Beloved Adventuress is considered a lost film.
