= Merely Players (film) =

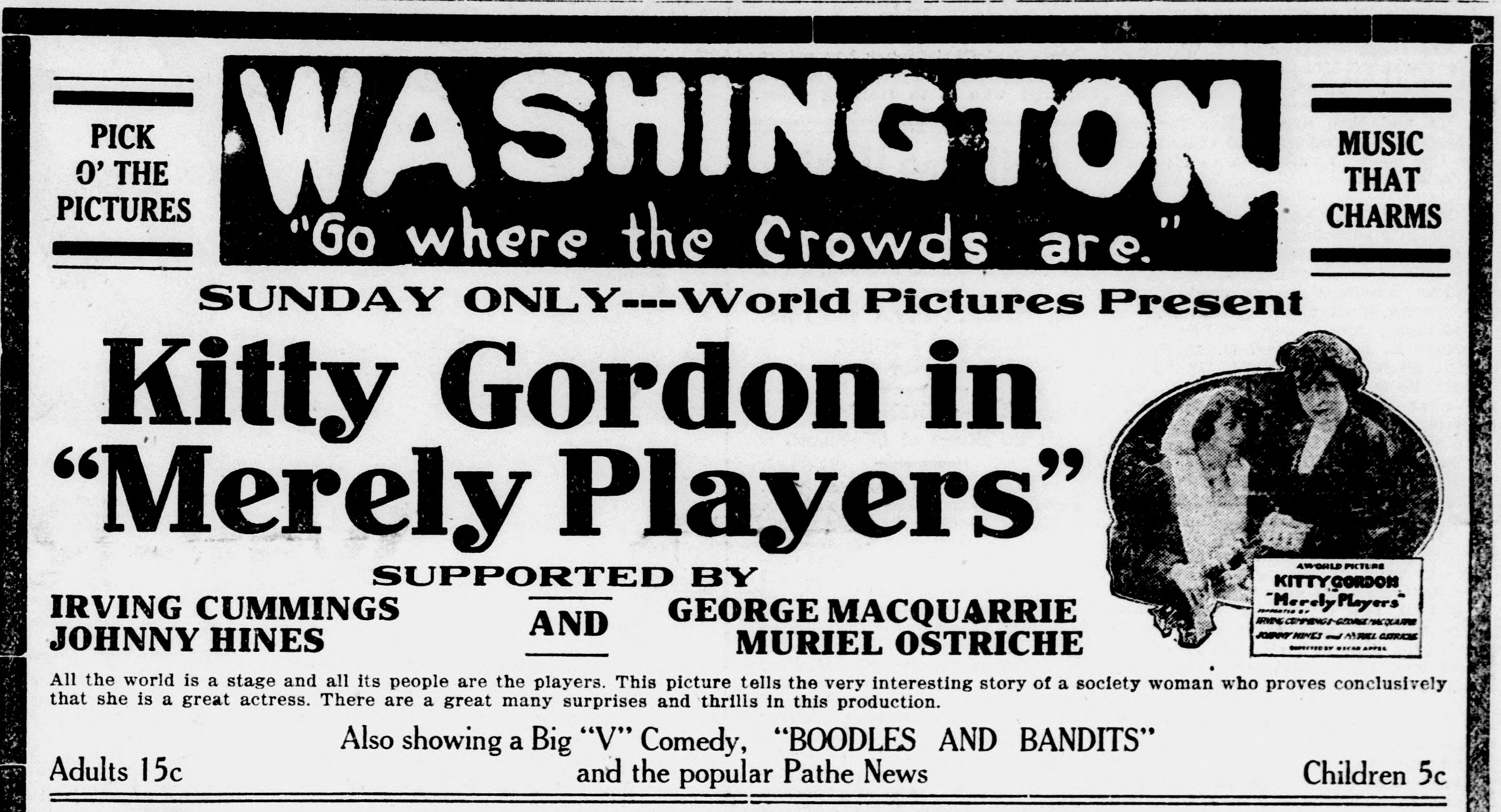
- Newspaper advertisement
- Directed by: Oscar Apfel
- Written by: Wallace Clifton
- Based on: a story by Lillian Case Russell
- Produced by: William A. Brady
- Starring: Kitty Gordon
- Cinematography: Lucien Tainguy
- Distributed by: World Film Company
- Release date: August 19, 1918
- Running time: 50 minutes
- Country: USA
- Language: Silent (with English titles)

Merely Players is a lost 1918 American silent drama film directed by Oscar Apfel and starring Kitty Gordon and Irving Cummings. It was produced and distributed by World Film Company films.

== Cast ==
- Kitty Gordon - Nadine Trent
- Irving Cummings - Rodney Gale
- George MacQuarrie - Hollis Foster
- Johnny Hines - Sammy Meyers
- Pinna Nesbit - Maude Foster
- Muriel Ostriche - Vera Seynave
- Florence Coventry - Mrs. Seynave
- Dore Davidson - Adolph Forman

== Preservation ==
With no holdings located in archives, Merely Players is considered a lost film.
