= A Maid of Belgium =

1917 film directed by George Archainbaud

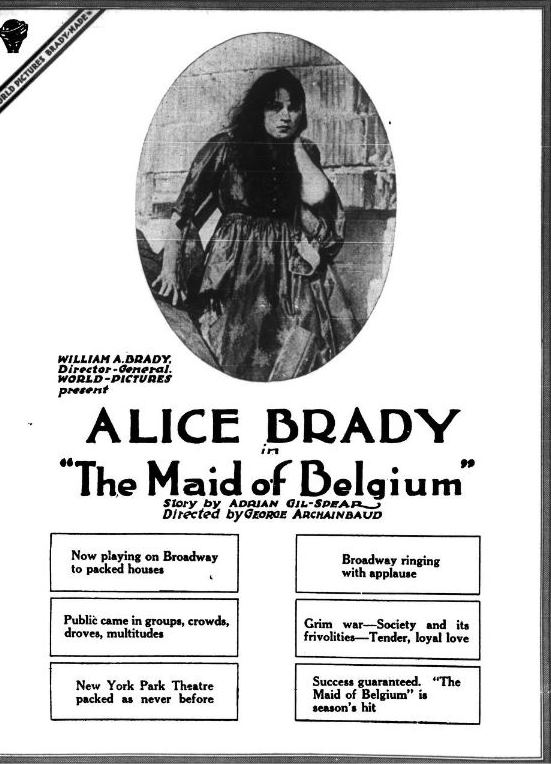
- Directed by: George Archainbaud
- Written by: Adrian Gil-Spear
- Produced by: William A. Brady
- Starring: Alice Brady; Louise de Rigney; George MacQuarrie
- Cinematography: Philip Hatkin
- Production company: Peerless Productions
- Distributed by: World Film
- Release date: October 14, 1917
- Running time: 50 minutes
- Country: United States
- Languages: Silent; English intertitles

A Maid of Belgium is a 1917 American silent drama film directed by George Archainbaud and starring Alice Brady, Louise de Rigney and George MacQuarrie.

== Cast ==
- Alice Brady as Adoree
- Louise de Rigney as Claire Hudson
- George MacQuarrie as Roger Hudson
- Richard Clarke as Rollins
- Lotta Burnell as Joan
- Tony Merlo as Dr. Thorn

== Bibliography ==
- James Robert Parish & Michael R. Pitts. Film directors: a guide to their American films. Scarecrow Press, 1974.
