= As in a Looking Glass =

1916 film by Frank Hall Crane

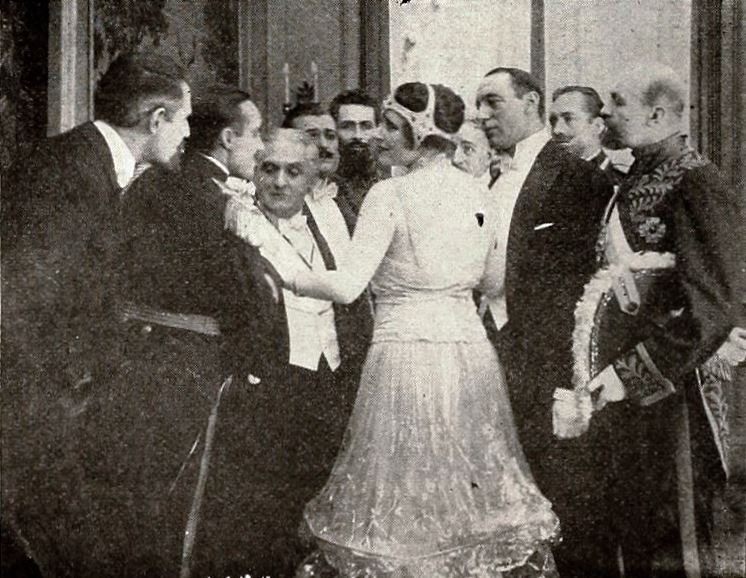
- Film still from a magazine
- Directed by: Frank Hall Crane
- Written by: Francis Charles Philips
- Based on: play, As in a Looking Glass by Francis Charles Philips
- Produced by: World Film Corporation
- Starring: Kitty Gordon
- Cinematography: Edward Horn
- Distributed by: World Film Corporation
- Release date: March 1916
- Running time: 5 reels
- Country: United States
- Language: Silent (English intertitles)

As in a Looking Glass is a lost 1916 American silent drama film directed by Frank Hall Crane and starring famous stage star Kitty Gordon in her motion picture debut. It was produced by and distributed by the World Film Corporation.

== Cast ==
- Kitty Gordon as Lila Despard
- Lumsden Hare as Andrew Livingston (credited as F. Lumsden Hare)
- Frank Goldsmith as Jack Firthenbras
- Gladden James as Lord Udolpho
- Teddy Sampson as Felice
- Charles Eldridge as Senator Gales
- Eugenie Woodward as Mrs. Gales
- George Majeroni as Dromiroff
- Lillian Cook as Miss Vyse
- Philip W. Masi as Rowell
