= Her Hour =

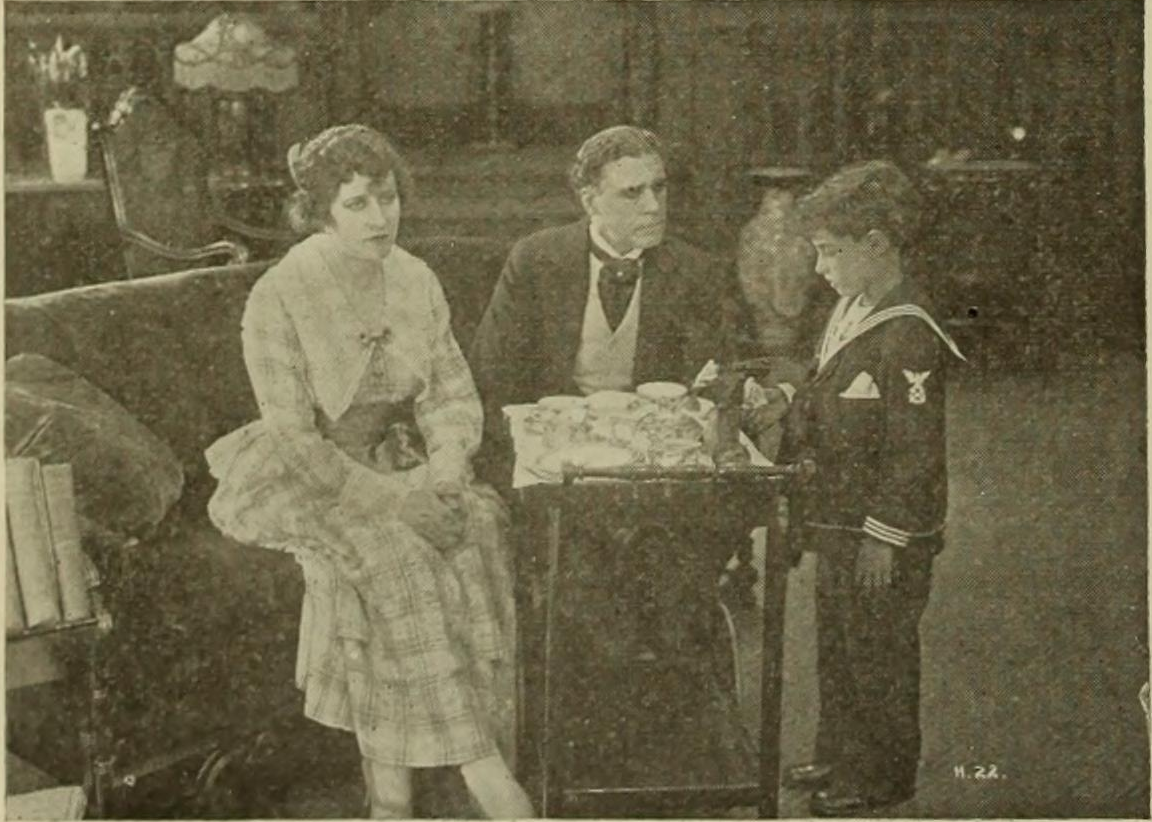
- Directed by: George Cowl
- Written by: Raymond Schrock(story)
- Produced by: World Film Company; William A. Brady
- Starring: Kitty Gordon
- Cinematography: Louis Ostland
- Distributed by: World Film Company
- Release date: November 19, 1917
- Running time: 6 reels
- Country: United States
- Language: Silent..English titles

Her Hour is a lost 1917 American silent drama film directed by George Cowl and starring Kitty Gordon. It was produced and released by the World Film Company.

== Plot ==
According to a film magazine, "Rita Castle, the heroine, is a working girl whose beauty, she quickly learns, may be turned into an important asset. She obtains a position with a prominent lawyer and he at once proceeds to make ardent love to her. Believing him to be sincere. Rita trusts him beyond the point of discretion and is rewarded by being cast off when she confides to the man of law that she needs the protection of his name. She goes to a friend in the country and remains with her until her child is born. Some time later she becomes the wife of a widower, without telling him the facts about herself. The man who betrayed her crosses her path again, with the result that Rita's husband learns the truth and obtains a divorce.

During the years that intervene before Rita's child has grown into young womanhood, her unhappy mother has employed her beauty and brains in helping certain political gentlemen to carry their plans to a successful issue. When the rascally lawyer runs for office, he finds that Rita is his enemy. His political manager attempts to assault Alicia, the daughter he has never acknowledged, and her mother shoots the man down. She and Alicia are arrested for the murder and acquitted. But a new complication arises. The son of the man who married and divorced Rita falls in love with Alicia. Realizing that the elder Christie will never consent to the match when he learns who the girl's mother is, Rita swears that she has been deceiving Alicia — that her real parents are dead. The pain of her renunciation is too much for her weakened heart and she expires under the strain."

== Cast ==
- Kitty Gordon - Rita Castle
- George Morgan - Tom Castle
- George MacQuarrie - Ralph Christie
- Frank Beamish - Val Clement
- Yolande Brown - Mrs. Trent
- Edmund Burns - Dick Christie(*as Edward Burns)
- Lillian Cook - Alicia
- Justine Cutting - Mrs. Duggan
- Eric Mayne - Phidias Trent
- Jean Wilson - Trent's Daugh
