= The Price of Pride =

1917 film

- Directed by: Harley Knoles
- Written by: Milton Nobles
- Starring: Carlyle Blackwell; June Elvidge; Evelyn Greeley
- Cinematography: Arthur Edeson
- Production company: Peerless Productions
- Distributed by: World Film
- Release date: July 2, 1917
- Running time: 50 minutes
- Country: United States
- Languages: Silent; English intertitles

The Price of Pride is a lost 1917 American silent Western film directed by Harley Knoles and starring Carlyle Blackwell, June Elvidge and Evelyn Greeley.

== Cast ==
- Carlyle Blackwell as David / William
- June Elvidge as Nan Westland
- Frank R. Mills as Jeffrey Arnold Black
- Evelyn Greeley as Kathleen May
- George MacQuarrie as Ben Richardson
- Charles W. Charles as Judge Endicott
- Pinna Nesbit as Madge Endicott Black

== Bibliography ==
- Langman, Larry. American Film Cycles: The Silent Era. Greenwood Publishing, 1998.
