= Irving Cummings =

American actor (1888–1959)

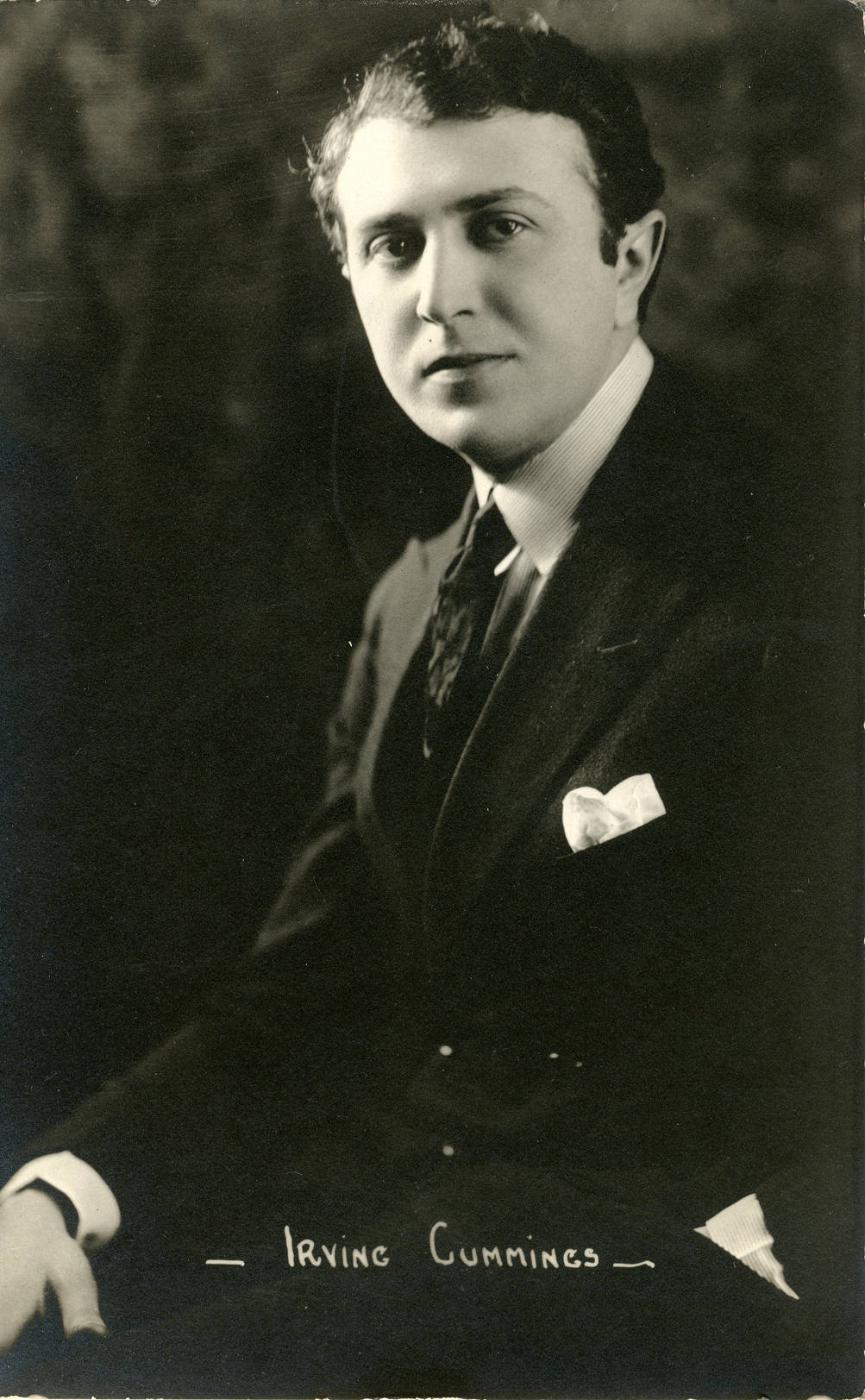
- Cummings in 1922
- Born: Irving Caminsky; October 9, 1888; New York City, U.S.
- Died: April 18, 1959 (aged 70); Los Angeles, California, U.S.
- Occupations: Film director; actor
- Years active: 1903–1954
- Spouse: Ruth Sinclair (m.1917)
- Children: Irving Cummings Jr.

Irving Cummings (October 9, 1888 – April 18, 1959) was an American film director and actor.

== Career ==
Born in New York City as Irving Caminsky, Cummings started his acting career at age 16 in Diplomacy. His Broadway, performances included In the Long Run (1909) and Object -- Matrimony (1916). Acting in the Proctor Stock Company, Cummings appeared with Lillian Russell and other actresses.

Cummings entered into movies in 1909, acting with the P. A. Powers company in Mount Vernon, New York, and quickly became a popular leading man. Few of the films he made as an actor are easily available. Exceptions include Buster Keaton's first feature film, The Saphead (1920), in which Cummings plays a crooked stockbroker; Fred Niblo's film Sex (1920), one of the first films to depict a new phenomenon in 1920s America, the Flapper; and The Round-Up (1920), a Western drama starring Roscoe Arbuckle (with the famous tagline "Nobody loves a fat man") and featuring Wallace Beery. Around the same time, Cummings started to direct action movies and occasional comedies. In 1934, Cummings directed Grand Canary, and in 1929, he was nominated for an Academy Award for his direction of In Old Arizona.

Cummings was known for the big splashy 1930s Technicolor musicals with popular leading ladies such as Betty Grable, Alice Faye, Carmen Miranda, and Shirley Temple (Little Miss Broadway, 1938) he directed at 20th Century Fox. He retired in 1954.

== Personal life and death ==
Cummings was married to Ruth Sinclair, and they had a son, screenwriter and producer Irving Cummings Jr.

On April 18, 1959, Cummings died at Cedars of Lebanon Hospital of a heart attack in Hollywood, California, at age 70.

== Recognition ==
Cummings has a star at 6816 Hollywood Boulevard on the Hollywood Walk of Fame. It was dedicated on February 8, 1960. In 1943, as part of the 50th anniversary of the birth of the motion picture industry, Cummings was awarded the Thomas A. Edison Foundation Gold Medal for outstanding achievement in the arts and sciences.

== Filmography ==
=== Actor ===
- Uncle Tom's Cabin (1914)
- The Three of Us (1914)
- The Diamond from the Sky (1915)
- The World's Great Snare (1916)
- The Gilded Cage (1916)
- The Whip (1917)
- Sister Against Sister (1917)
- A Royal Romance (1917)
- Wrath of Love (1917)
- Rasputin, The Black Monk (1917)
- An American Widow (1917)
- The Struggle Everlasting (1918)
- The Heart of a Girl (1918)
- The Interloper (1918)
- Merely Players (1918)
- The Woman Who Gave (1918)
- Don't Change Your Husband (1919)
- Mandarin's Gold (1919)
- Her Code of Honor (1919)
- The Scar (1919)
- Some Bride (1919)
- Secret Service (1919)
- Men, Women, and Money (1919)
- What Every Woman Learns (1919)
- Auction of Souls (1919)
- Everywoman (1919)
- The Thirteenth Commandment (1920)
- The Tree of Knowledge (1920)
- Sex (1920)
- Harriet and the Piper (1920)
- The Saphead (1920)
- The Round-Up (1920)
- Old Dad (1920)
- Cameron of the Royal Mounted (1921)
- The Blasphemer (1921)
- The Man from Hell's River (1922)
- Flesh and Blood (1922)
- East Side - West Side (1923)
- Rupert of Hentzau (1923)
- As Man Desires (1925)
- Girls' Dormitory (1936) (uncredited)
- The Devil and Miss Jones (1941) (uncredited)

=== Director ===
- Flesh and Blood (1922)
- Broad Daylight (1922)
- The Jilt (1922)
- The Man from Hell's River (1922)
- Paid Back (1922)
- Environment (1922)
- The Drug Traffic (1923)
- East Side - West Side (1923)
- Broken Hearts of Broadway (1923)
- Stolen Secrets (1924)
- In Every Woman's Life (1924)
- Riders Up (1924)
- Fools Highway (1924)
- The Dancing Cheat (1924)
- The Rose of Paris (1924)
- As Man Desires (1925)
- One Year to Live (1925)
- Just a Woman (1925)
- The Desert Flower (1925)
- Infatuation (1925)
- The Johnstown Flood (1926)
- Rustling for Cupid (1926)
- The Midnight Kiss (1926)
- The Country Beyond (1926)
- Bertha, the Sewing Machine Girl (1926)
- The Brute (1927)
- The Port of Missing Girls (1928)
- Romance of the Underworld (1928)
- Dressed to Kill (1928)
- In Old Arizona (1928)
- Behind That Curtain (1929)
- Not Quite Decent (1929)
- Cameo Kirby (1930)
- On the Level (1930)
- A Devil with Women (1930)
- A Holy Terror (1931)
- The Cisco Kid (1931)
- Attorney for the Defense (1932)
- The Night Club Lady (1932)
- Man Against Woman (1932)
- Man Hunt (1933)
- The Woman I Stole (1933)
- The Mad Game (1933)
- I Believed in You (1934)
- Grand Canary (1934)
- The White Parade (1934)
- Curly Top (1935)
- It's a Small World (1935)
- Poor Little Rich Girl (1936)
- Girls' Dormitory (1936)
- White Hunter (1936)
- Vogues of 1938 (1937)
- Merry-Go-Round of 1938 (1937)
- Little Miss Broadway (1938)
- Just Around the Corner (1938)
- Everything Happens at Night (1939)
- Hollywood Cavalcade (1939)
- The Story of Alexander Graham Bell (1939)
- Lillian Russell (1940)
- Down Argentine Way (1940)
- That Night in Rio (1941)
- Belle Starr (1941)
- Louisiana Purchase (1941)
- My Gal Sal (1942)
- Springtime in the Rockies (1942)
- Sweet Rosie O'Grady (1943)
- What a Woman! (1943)
- The Impatient Years (1944)
- The Dolly Sisters (1945)
- Double Dynamite (1951)
