= The Scar (1919 film) =

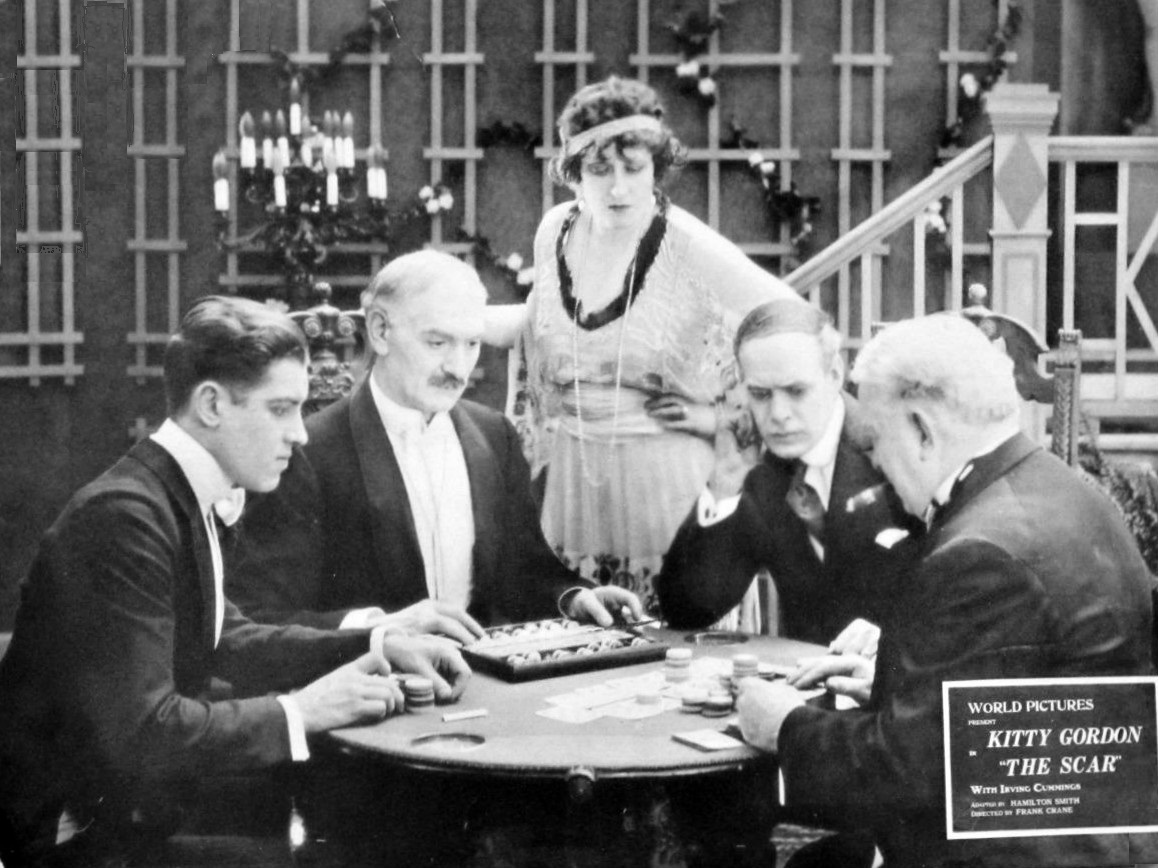
- Lobby card
- Directed by: Frank Hall Crane
- Written by: Hamilton Smith
- Starring: Kitty Gordon; Irving Cummings
- Cinematography: Lucien Tainguy
- Production company: World Film Company
- Distributed by: World Film Company
- Release date: April 14, 1919
- Running time: 5 reels
- Country: United States
- Language: Silent (English intertitles)

The Scar is a 1919 American silent drama film directed by Frank Hall Crane and starring Kitty Gordon and Irving Cummings. It was produced and distributed by World Film Company.

== Plot ==
George Reynolds, an American, fights a duel in South America with the Spaniard Valdez over the affections of Cora, a Spanish adventuress, and later brings her back to the United States, where she becomes involved with his friend Caryl Haskill. During a struggle, Cora is accidentally shot and George is convicted, serving five years in prison while she taunts him during his forced labor. After his release, Cora opens a gambling house in New York, where Caryl becomes addicted, loses everything, and takes his own life. Hoping for a new beginning, George marries Frances Tabor, but Cora, consumed by vengeance, tries to destroy his marriage and even attempts to have him re-arrested, though she fails. Ultimately, her obsession drives her into madness, and she is confined to an asylum.

== Cast ==
- Kitty Gordon as Cora
- Irving Cummings as George Reynolds
- Jennie Ellison as Mrs. Reynolds
- Eric Mayne as Hastings
- Charles Dungan as Cavanaugh
- Frank Farrington as Thaddeus Tabor
- Ruth Findlay as Frances Tabor
- Paul Doucet as Valdez
- David Herblin as Caryl Haskill
- Herbert Bradshaw as Willard
- Amelie Barleon as Cora's Maid (credited as Amelia Barleon)

== Preservation ==
It is unknown whether the film survives as no copies have been located, likely lost.
