= The Divine Sacrifice =

The Divine Sacrifice (aka: Carew's Wives)
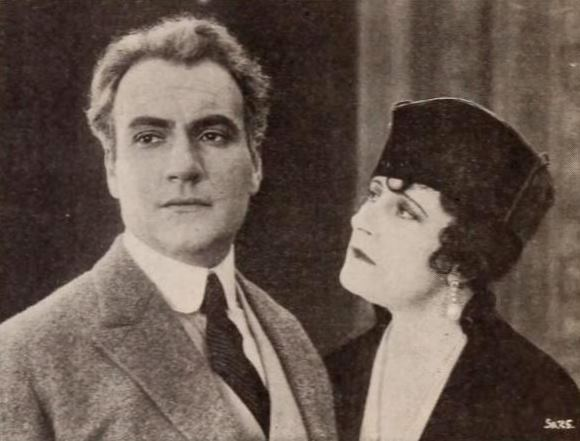
- still of Jean Angelo and Kitty Gordon
- Directed by: George Archainbaud
- Based on: story by Alma Speer Benzing
- Produced by: William A. Brady
- Starring: Kitty Gordon
- Cinematography: Philip Hatkin
- Distributed by: World Film Company
- Release date: February 4, 1918
- Running time: 5 reels
- Country: USA
- Language: Silent...English intertitles

The Divine Sacrifice is a lost 1918 American silent drama film directed by George Archainbaud and starring stage star Kitty Gordon. Gordon's real life daughter, Vera Beresford, has a role in the picture. A twenty second fragment of the film, has been found & identified on YouTube (0:20-0:40 in video).

== Cast ==
- Kitty Gordon - Madeline Spencer
- Selene Johnson - Helen Carewe
- Jean Angelo - David Carewe
- Frank Goldsmith - Rupert Spencer
- Charles Dungan - Dr. Merwin
- Mildred Beckwith - Linda
- Vera Beresford - June
- Ethel Burner - Timmie
- Harry Frazer - Robert Spencer
