= The Tenth Case =

1917 silent film

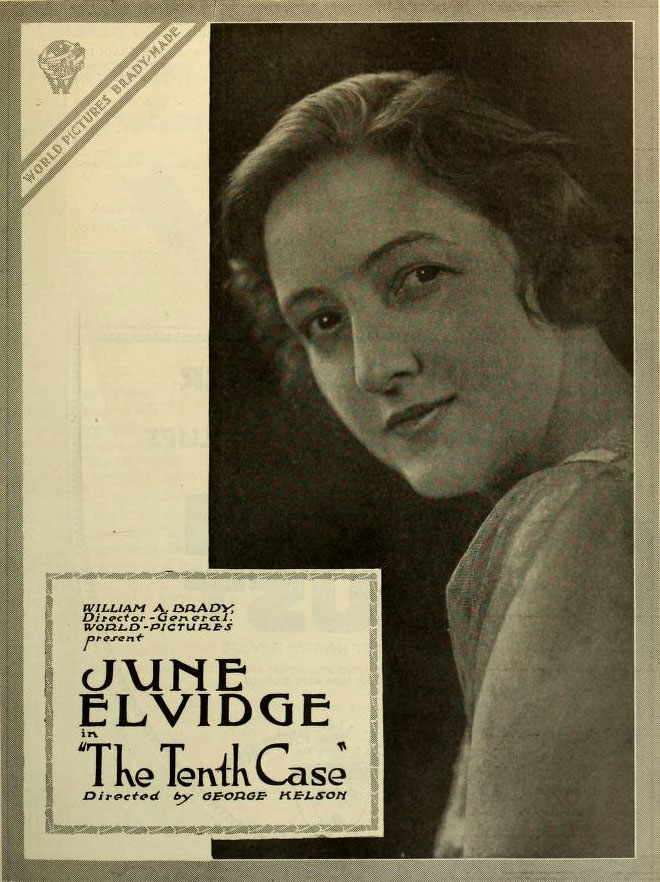
- Directed by: George Kelson
- Written by: Robert Hull
- Produced by: William A. Brady
- Starring: June Elvidge; John Bowers; George MacQuarrie
- Production company: World Film
- Distributed by: World Film
- Release date: December 17, 1917
- Running time: 5 reels
- Country: United States
- Languages: Silent; English intertitles

The Tenth Case is a lost 1917 American silent drama film directed by George Kelson and starring June Elvidge, John Bowers and George MacQuarrie.

== Cast ==
- June Elvidge as Claudia Payton
- John Bowers as Sanford King
- George MacQuarrie as Jerome Landis
- Gladden James as Harry Landis
- Eric Mayne as Schuyler Payton
- Eloise Clement as Laura Brandon
- Charles Dungan as Judge Wallace

== Preservation ==
With no holdings located in archives, The Tenth Case is considered a lost film.

== Bibliography ==
- Langman, Larry. American Film Cycles: The Silent Era. Greenwood Publishing, 1998.
