= Equitable Motion Picture Corporation =

Silent film company launched in 1915

Equitable Motion Picture Company was a short-lived but influential silent film company. It was launched in 1915. It was headed by Arthur Spiegel. It distributed its films through William A. Brady's World Film Company. It was acquired by World Film in 1916, with the agreement signed on January 29, 1916, afterwards it was consolidated under Brady's control.

In 1915 the startup film company signed Margarita Fischer and Harry Pollard, and also signed Clara Kimball Young It took over the Horsley (David Horsley) studio in Bayonne, New Jersey.

Cinematographer William C. Foster worked for Equitable.

== Filmography ==
- The Warning (1915)
- The Cowardly Way (1915)
- The Woman in 47 (1916)
- The Shadow of a Doubt (1916)
