= Youth (1917 film) =

1917 silent drama film

- Directed by: Romaine Fielding
- Written by: Roy S. Sensabaugh
- Produced by: William A. Brady
- Starring: Carlyle Blackwell; June Elvidge; Johnny Hines
- Cinematography: William S. Cooper
- Production company: World Film
- Distributed by: World Film
- Release date: August 6, 1917
- Running time: 50 minutes
- Country: United States
- Languages: Silent; English intertitles

Youth is a 1917 American silent drama film directed by Romaine Fielding and starring Carlyle Blackwell, June Elvidge and Johnny Hines.

== Cast ==
- Carlyle Blackwell as Bryan Goodwin
- June Elvidge as Jean Elliott
- Johnny Hines as Kamura
- George Cowl as Henry Elliott
- Muriel Ostriche as Grace Van Seer
- Robert Broderick as James Goodwin
- Victor Kennard as Murray Bronson
- Henrietta Simpson as Mrs. Van Seer
- Henry West as Dougherty

== Bibliography ==
- Ann Catherine Paietta & Jean L. Kauppila. Health Professionals on Screen. Scarecrow Press, 1999.
