= The Strong Way =

1917 film

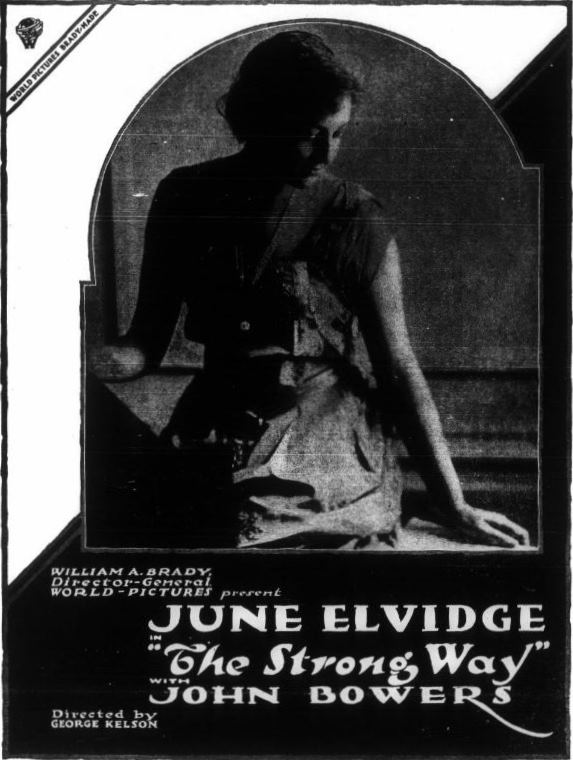
- Directed by: George Kelson
- Written by: Octavus Roy Cohen
- Produced by: William A. Brady
- Starring: June Elvidge; John Bowers; Isabel Berwin
- Production company: World Film
- Distributed by: World Film
- Release date: December 31, 1917
- Running time: 5 reels
- Country: United States
- Languages: Silent; English intertitles

The Strong Way is a 1917 American silent drama film directed by George Kelson and starring June Elvidge, John Bowers and Isabel Berwin.

== Cast ==
- June Elvidge as Eunice Torrence
- John Bowers as Don Chadwick
- Isabel Berwin as Mrs. Torrence
- Joseph Herbert as Geoffrey Farrow
- Rosina Henley as Martha
- Grace Williams as Stenographer
- Hubert Wilke as Dan Carter

== Censorship ==
Before The Strong Way could be exhibited in Kansas, the Kansas Board of Review required the elimination of bedroom scenes between a maid and Dan Carter.

== Bibliography ==
- John T. Soister, Henry Nicolella, Steve Joyce. American Silent Horror, Science Fiction and Fantasy Feature Films, 1913-1929. McFarland, 2014.
