= The Volunteer (1917 film) =

1917 film directed by Harley Knoles

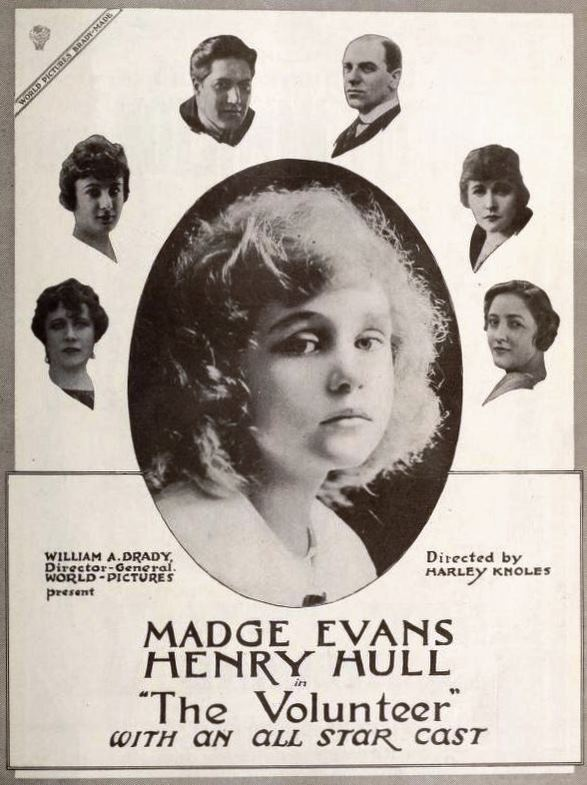
- Directed by: Harley Knoles
- Written by: Julia Burnham
- Produced by: William A. Brady
- Starring: Madge Evans; Henry Hull; Muriel Ostriche
- Cinematography: René Guissart
- Production company: World Film
- Distributed by: World Film
- Release date: December 24, 1917
- Running time: 50 minutes
- Country: United States
- Languages: Silent; English intertitles

The Volunteer is a 1917 American silent drama film directed by Harley Knoles and starring Madge Evans, Henry Hull and Muriel Ostriche. It was shot at Fort Lee studios.

== Plot ==
According to a film magazine, "Madge Evans's daddy enlists for service abroad and her mother enroles as a red-cross nurse in order to do her bit, making it necessary for Madge to give up her picture work and go to live with her grandparents, who are stern old Quakers.

Madge bids farewell to all of her studio friends and journeys to the home of her grandparents, only to find they consider it unseemly to show any signs of affection to the little girl, and that good times and moving pictures do not enter into their routine of life. Her grandfather refuses to allow her to wear her dresses, instead making her wear a modest Quaker frock.

Madge attends the village school but is jeered at by the "teacher's pet," who makes life more or less unendurable for her until "The Little Duchess" is shown in town with Madge as the star. Then she has to succumb to Madge's charms, and even the grandmother and grandfather take a peep at the picture, unbeknown to each other, and find themselves laughing and crying like human beings.

Madge's uncle Jonathan wishes to enlist in the army although it is against the teachings of his religion and against the commands of his father who claims he will disown him if he persists in speaking of the matter. On his twenty-first birthday, however, Jonathan enlists and also makes a speech calling for volunteers. When the recruits do not enlist fast enough little Madge makes a speech herself, telling how her mother and daddy are working "over there" and begging young men to follow their example.

The young men start to enlist in droves and then there is nothing left for Madge to do but try and soften her grandfather's heart so he will say good-bye to his only son. Her grandfather cannot resist her pleadings although he had sworn never to speak to his son again, and with the reconciliation comes the realization that he is a bigoted old crank and that one ounce of a child's love is worth more than all the relentless teachings of his religion."

== Cast ==
- Madge Evans as herself
- Henry Hull as Jonathan Mendenhall
- Muriel Ostriche as Madge's Mother
- Victor Kennard as Madge's Father
- Jack Drumier as Timothy Mendenhall
- Kate Lester as Tabitha Mendenhall
- Charles W. Charles as Pop
- William A. Brady as himself, Cameo Appearance
- Kitty Gordon as herself, Cameo Appearance
- Ethel Clayton as herself, Cameo Appearance
- June Elvidge as herself, Cameo Appearance
- Evelyn Greeley as herself, Cameo Appearance
- Carlyle Blackwell as himself, Cameo Appearance
- Montagu Love as himself, Cameo Appearance
- Harley Knoles as himself, Cameo Appearance
- Robert McIntyre as himself, Cameo Appearance

== Bibliography ==
- Paul M. Edwards. World War I on Film: English Language Releases through 2014. McFarland, 2016.
