= Paying the Price (1916 film) =

- Directed by: Frank Hall Crane
- Screenplay by: Gardner Hunting
- Produced by: William A. Brady
- Starring: George Relph; Gail Kane; Gladden James
- Cinematography: Sol Polito
- Production company: Paragon Films
- Distributed by: World Film Corporation
- Release date: July 9, 1916 (USA)
- Running time: 5 reels
- Country: United States
- Language: English

Paying the Price is a 1916 American silent film directed by Frank Hall Crane. The screenplay was by Gardner Hunting and cinematography by Sol Polito. Produced by William A. Brady for Paragon Films, it was distributed by the World Film Corporation and released on July 9, 1916. The short film of five reels was made in cooperation with the United States Navy who allowed the company to use the U.S. Torpedo Boat No. 60, the U.S.S Wadsworth, in the making of the film. This included the firing of torpedoes, one of which was used to blow up an old ferryboat.

The film's plot centers around a love triangle involving naval officer Paul Towne (George Relph), Paul's longtime girlfriend Judith Corbin (Gail Kane), and Judith's new suitor Richard Tracy (Gladden James). Judith accepts Richard's proposal after Paul delays for years in asking for Judith's hand in marriage. Gambling debts lead Richard into a career in espionage for a foreign power, and he attempts to steel secrets from the U.S. Navy. Richard is killed while spying on weapon's testing of new explosives. Paul and Judith reconcile and marry. Supporting characters in the film include General Corbin, U.S.A. (Robert Cummings), Mrs. Towne (Lydia Knott), Evan Vrooman (George Mageroni), and Countess Nimy (June Elvidge).

The National Film Preservation Board included it on its list of lost silent films in January 2021.

== Cast ==
- Paul Towne by George Relph
- Judith Corbin by Gail Kane
- Richard Tracy by Gladden James
- General Corbin by Robert Cummings
- Mrs. Towne by Lydia Knott
- Evan Vrooman by George Mageroni
- Countess Nimy by June Elvidge
