= La vie de Bohème =

1916 film by Albert Capellani

La vie de Bohème -France
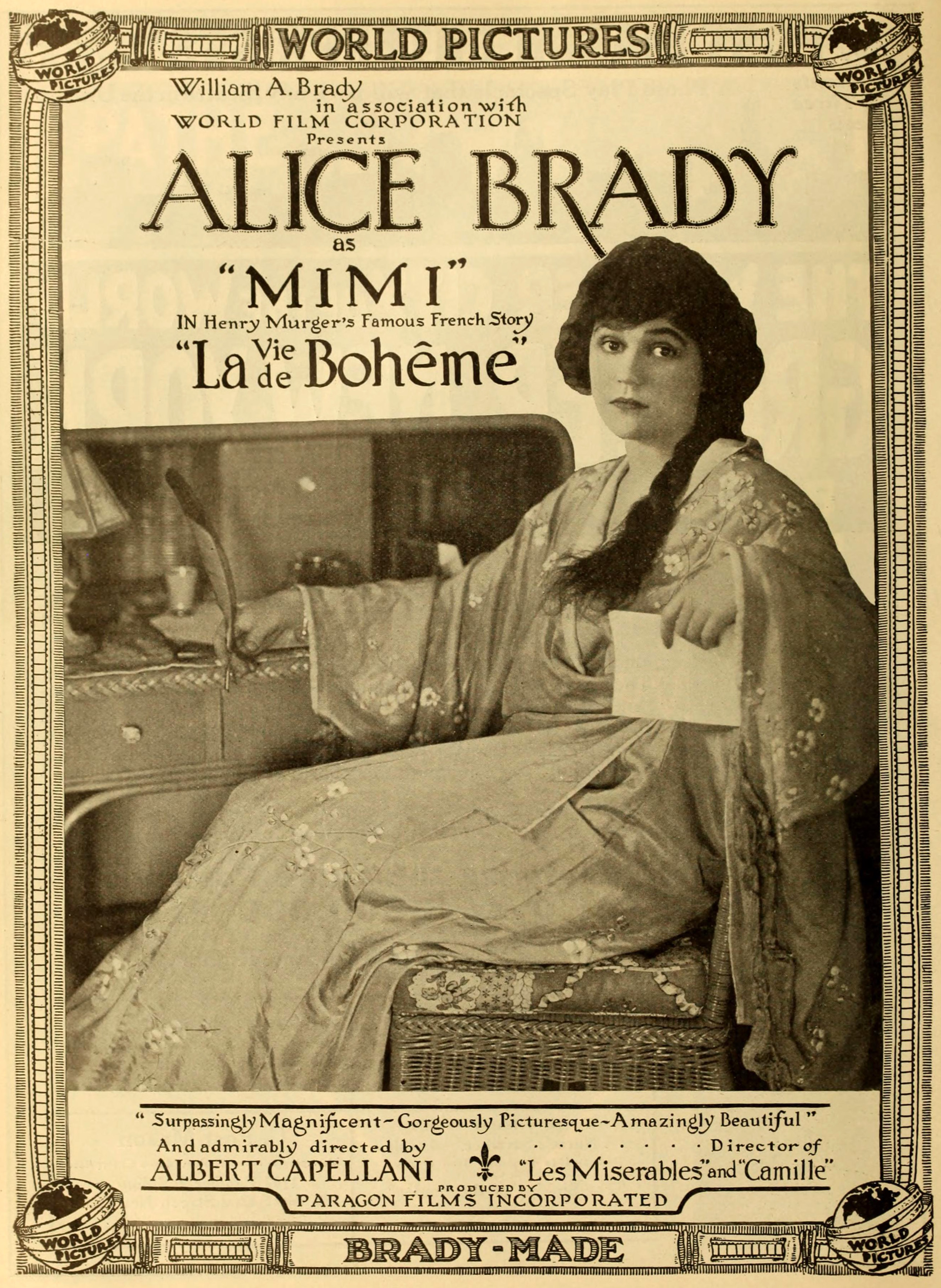
- 1916 advertisement
- Directed by: Albert Capellani
- Written by: Frances Marion (scenario)
- Based on: Scènes de la vie de bohème (1847–49) novel by Henri Murger
- Produced by: William A. Brady
- Starring: Alice Brady; Paul Capellani
- Cinematography: Lucien Andriot
- Distributed by: World-Selznick
- Release date: June 19, 1916
- Running time: 5 reels
- Country: United States
- Language: Silent (English intertitles)

La vie de Bohème (sometimes referred to as La Bohème ) is a 1916 American silent historical film directed by Albert Capellani and distributed by World Pictures. The star of this version is Alice Brady, whose father William A. Brady was the founder of World Pictures. This film is one of many silent versions, actually the third or fourth. Later silent versions appeared in 1917 and 1926 starring Lillian Gish. Director Albert Capellani's brother, Paul Capellani, who appears in this film, had made his own short version in 1912.

== Cast ==
- Alice Brady as Mimi
- Paul Capellani as Rudolphe
- June Elvidge as Madame de Rouvre
- Leslie Stowe as Durandin
- Chester Barnett as Marcel
- Zena Keefe as Musette
- Frederick Truesdell as Author (credited as Frederick C. Truesdell)
- D. J. Flanagan as Schaunard

unbilled

- Juliette Clarens

== Production ==
Almost the entirety of La vie de Bohème was filmed at Paragon Studios.

== Preservation ==
A print of La Bohème survives at George Eastman Museum Motion Picture Collection. This film only survived because MGM purchased it for rights purposes to remake the story with Lillian Gish in 1926.
