= The Marriage Market (1917 film) =

1917 silent drama film

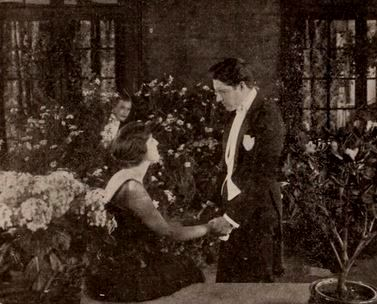
- Directed by: Arthur Ashley
- Written by: Clay Mantley
- Produced by: William A. Brady
- Starring: Carlyle Blackwell; June Elvidge; Arthur Ashley
- Cinematography: Jacques Monteran; Lewis G. Ostland
- Production company: World Film
- Distributed by: World Film
- Release date: September 10, 1917
- Running time: 5 reels
- Country: United States
- Languages: Silent; English intertitles

The Marriage Market is a lost 1917 American silent drama film directed by Arthur Ashley and starring Carlyle Blackwell, June Elvidge and Arthur Ashley.

== Cast ==
- June Elvidge as Helen Grant
- Arthur Ashley as Bradley Spayden
- Carlyle Blackwell as Richard Marlowe
- Frederick Truesdell as Eric Foxhall
- Jack Drumier as John Grant
- Charles Duncan as Mr. Beale
- Eugenie Woodward as Mrs. Marlowe
- Lewis Edgard as Grimes

== Bibliography ==
- Langman, Larry. American Film Cycles: The Silent Era. Greenwood Publishing, 1998.
