= The Crimson Dove =

1917 film directed by Romaine Fielding

- Directed by: Romaine Fielding
- Written by: Frances Marion
- Produced by: William A. Brady
- Starring: Carlyle Blackwell; June Elvidge; Marie La Varre
- Cinematography: William S. Cooper
- Production company: Peerless Productions
- Distributed by: World Film
- Release date: June 4, 1917
- Country: United States
- Languages: Silent; English intertitles

The Crimson Dove is a 1917 American silent drama film directed by Romaine Fielding and starring Carlyle Blackwell, June Elvidge and Marie La Varre.

== Cast ==
- Carlyle Blackwell as Brand Cameron
- June Elvidge as Adrienne Durant
- Marie La Varre as Faro Kate
- Henry West as Jim Carewe
- Edward Hoyt as Jonathan Gregg
- Dion Titheradge as Philip Burbank
- Maxine Elliott Hicks as Minnie Zugg
- Louis R. Grisel as Joseph Burbank
- Norman Hackett as Half-witted Son
- George Cowl as Dr. Stewart
- Charles Hartley as Cameron's Old Servant
- Mildred Beckwith as Nevada
- Julia Stuart as Widow Oatmeal
- George S. Trimble as Durant
- Blanche Davenport as Mrs. Lundy
- Charles Sadlek as Dan Pollard

== Bibliography ==
- Cari Beauchamp. Without Lying Down: Frances Marion and the Powerful Women of Early Hollywood. University of California Press, 1998.
