= The Hand of Peril =

1916 film directed by Maurice Tourneur

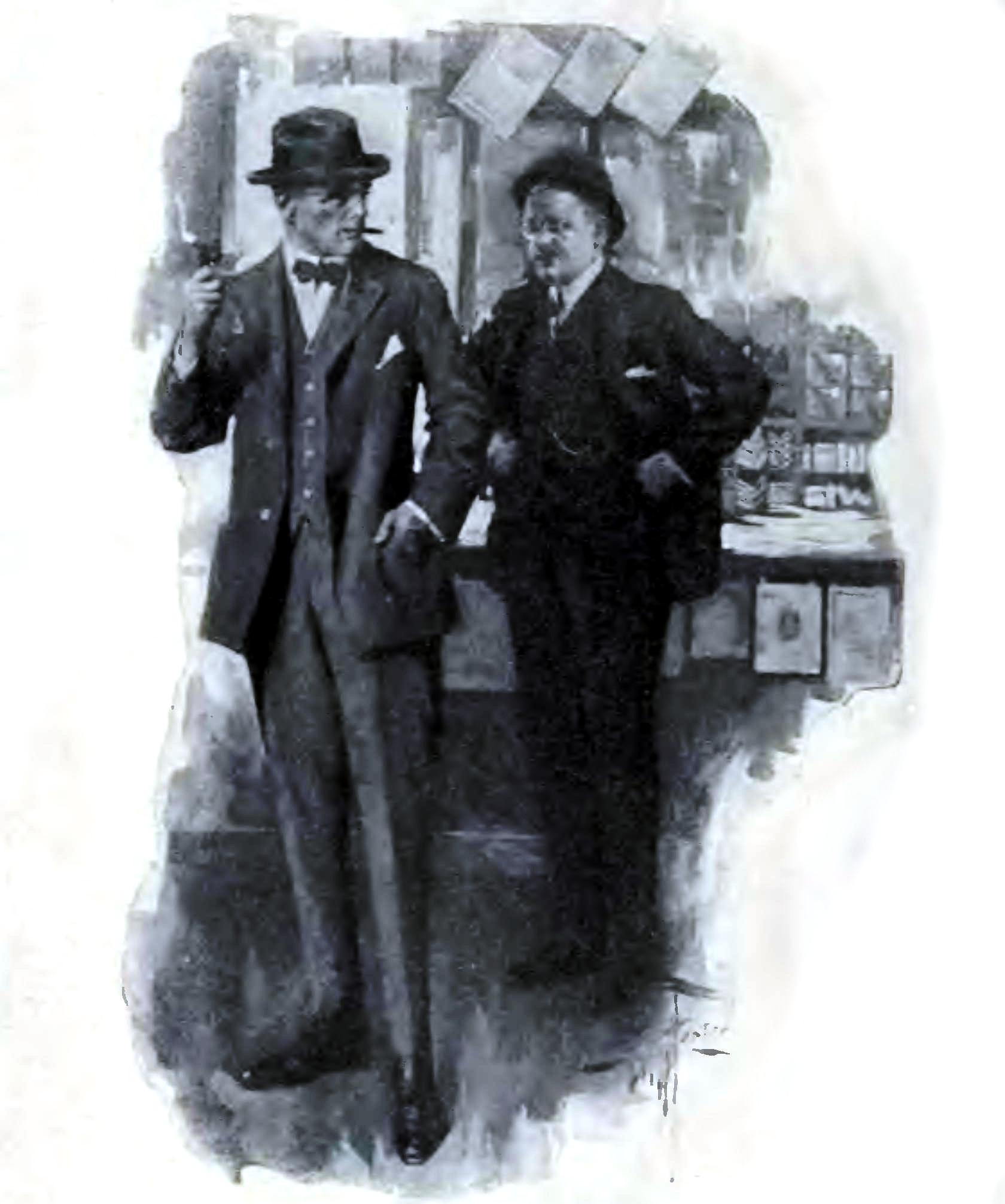
- The Hand of Peril
- Directed by: Maurice Tourneur
- Written by: Arthur Stringer (novel); Maurice Tourneur
- Produced by: Maurice Tourneur
- Starring: House Peters; June Elvidge; Ralph Delmore
- Edited by: Clarence Brown
- Production company: Paragon Films
- Distributed by: World Film
- Release date: March 27, 1916
- Running time: 66 minutes
- Country: United States
- Languages: Silent; English intertitles

The Hand of Peril is a 1916 American silent crime film directed by Maurice Tourneur and starring House Peters, June Elvidge and Ralph Delmore.

The film's sets were designed by the art director Ben Carré.

== Cast ==
- House Peters as James Kestner
- June Elvidge as Maura Lambert
- Ralph Delmore as Frank Lambert
- Doris Sawyer as 'Bull's Eye' Cherry
- Roy Pilcher as Tony Morello

== Production ==
On January 23, 1916, Tourneur was given the scenario for a film based on Arthur Stringer's 1915 novel The Hand of Peril.

As the film required showing action in multiple rooms at the same time, a three-story house with nine rooms was constructed on the Paragon Studios lot in Fort Lee, New Jersey. An abandoned pier in South Brooklyn was completely reconstructed for use in the film.

== Reception ==
In a review published in Billboard, the cast were praised for their "capable" acting and the film was praised for the "high quality" of photography and direction.
