= The Social Leper =

1917 film directed by Harley Knoles

- Directed by: Harley Knoles
- Written by: Florence Bolles (story); Frances Marion
- Produced by: William A. Brady
- Starring: Carlyle Blackwell; June Elvidge; Arthur Ashley
- Cinematography: Arthur Edeson
- Production company: Peerless Productions
- Distributed by: World Film
- Release date: March 19, 1917
- Running time: 50 minutes
- Country: United States
- Languages: Silent; English intertitles

The Social Leper is a 1917 American silent drama film directed by Harley Knoles and starring Carlyle Blackwell, Arthur Ashley and June Elvidge.

== Cast ==
- Carlyle Blackwell as John Dean
- Arthur Ashley as Robert Warren
- June Elvidge as Adrienne Van Couver
- George MacQuarrie as Henry Armstrong
- Isabel Berwin as Mrs. Stephen Barkley
- Evelyn Greeley as Lorraine Barkley
- Eugenie Woodward as Mrs. Dean
- Edna Whistler as Madame Melvina

== Bibliography ==
- Cari Beauchamp. Without Lying Down: Frances Marion and the Powerful Women of Early Hollywood. University of California Press, 1998.
