= The Rack (1915 film) =

1915 film by Emile Chautard

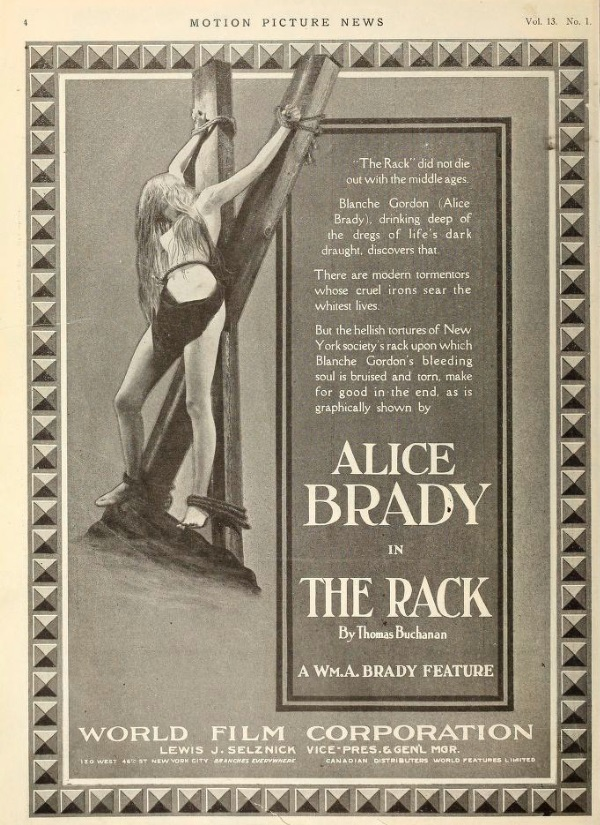
- Directed by: Emile Chautard
- Written by: Thompson Buchanan
- Based on: The Rack; 1911 play by Thompson Buchanan
- Produced by: William A. Brady
- Starring: Alice Brady; Milton Sills; June Elvidge
- Cinematography: Lucien Tainguy
- Production company: William A. Brady Picture Plays
- Distributed by: World Film
- Release date: December 27, 1915
- Running time: 5 reels
- Country: United States
- Languages: Silent; English intertitles

The Rack is a 1915 American silent drama film directed by Emile Chautard and starring Alice Brady, Milton Sills and June Elvidge.

== Plot summary ==
Habitual unfaithful husband, Jack Freeman begins flirting with the Effie McKenzie, and so breaks up her marriage. Blanche Gordon, a friend of Jack's wife Louise, then comes to see Jack several times in order to plead with him to give up extramarital affairs and accept the responsibilities that go with being a husband. Blanche's husband Tom, however, misunderstands these meetings and insists on a separation. When Jack is murdered, all of the evidence implicates Tom. At the trial, though, Blanche tries to take the blame for the murder, thereby making Tom realize that she really does love him. Just as Tom is about to confess in order to save Blanche, Effie's husband breaks down and admits to being the killer, after which Tom and Blanche are reunited.

== Cast ==
- Alice Brady as Mrs. Gordon
- Milton Sills as Tom Gordon
- June Elvidge as Louise Freeman
- Chester Barnett as Jack Freeman
- Doris Kenyon as Effie McKenzie
- George Cowl as Mr. McKenzie

== Bibliography ==
- Slide, Anthony. Silent Players: A Biographical and Autobiographical Study of 100 Silent Film Actors and Actresses. University Press of Kentucky, 2010.
