= East Side - West Side (1923 film) =

1923 film directed by Irving Cummings

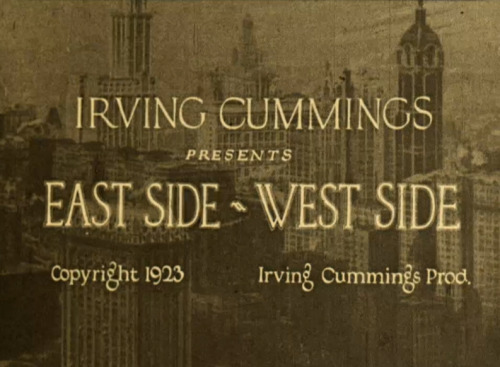
- Title card from the film
- Directed by: Irving Cummings
- Written by: Hope Loring; Louis D. Lighton
- Based on: East Side-West Side the play by: Leighton Osmun; Henry Hull
- Produced by: Irving Cummings
- Starring: Kenneth Harlan; Eileen Percy; Maxine Elliott Hicks
- Cinematography: Arthur Martinelli
- Production company: Principal Pictures
- Release date: June 1, 1923 (US)
- Running time: 6 reels
- Country: United States
- Languages: Silent; English intertitles

East Side - West Side (1923)

East Side - West Side is a 1923 American silent drama film. Directed by Irving Cummings, the film stars Kenneth Harlan, Eileen Percy, and Maxine Elliott Hicks.

It was released on June 1, 1923.

== Cast list ==
- Kenneth Harlan as Duncan Van Norman
- Eileen Percy as Lory James
- Maxine Elliott Hicks as Kit Lamson
- Lucille Hutton as Eunice Potter
- Lucille Ward as Mrs. Cornelia Van Norman
- John T. Prince as Paget
- Betty May as Amy Van Norman
- Charles Hill Mailes as Dr. Ernest Shepley
- Wally Van as Skiddy Stillman

== Reception ==
The Los Angeles Times gave the film a positive review, saying it presented "an absorbing story of New York life with tense moments and dramatic situations." The Pasadena Post also enjoyed the film calling it "a picture bound to appeal to everyone whose heart is kindled with romance and sentiment." They went on to say that the picture had "exceptional dramatic moments, and offers a realistic slice of life in the huge melting pot—New York." They specifically singled out the direction of Irving Cummings, as well as complimenting the acting of the cast.
