= Shall We Forgive Her? =

1917 film directed by Arthur Ashley

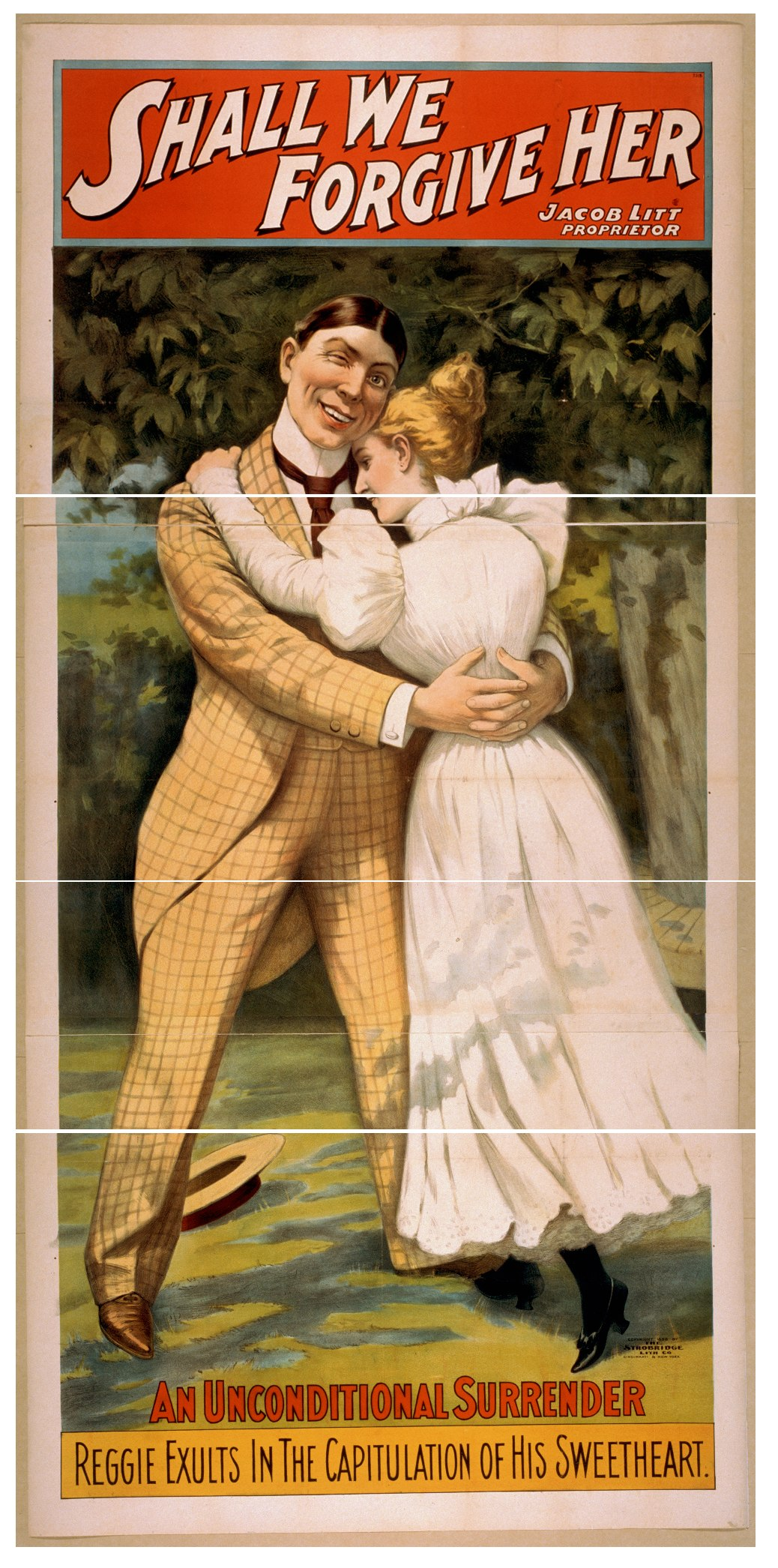
- Official poster
- Directed by: Arthur Ashley
- Written by: Frank Harvey (play); Charles Sarver
- Produced by: William A. Brady
- Starring: June Elvidge; John Bowers; Arthur Ashley
- Cinematography: Jacques Monteran
- Production company: World Film
- Distributed by: World Film
- Release date: December 31, 1917
- Running time: 5 reels
- Country: United States
- Languages: Silent; English intertitles

Shall We Forgive Her? is a 1917 American silent drama film directed by Arthur Ashley and starring June Elvidge, Arthur Ashley and John Bowers.

== Cast ==
- June Elvidge as Grace Raymond
- Arthur Ashley as Neil Garth
- John Bowers as Oliver West
- Captain Charles as Uncle John
- Richard Collins as Tom
- Arthur Matthews as Dick
- Herbert Barrington as Paul Ellsworth
- George MacQuarrie as James Stapleton
- Katherine Johnston as Nellie West
- Alexandria Carewe as Joan

== Bibliography ==
- Langman, Larry. American Film Cycles: The Silent Era. Greenwood Publishing, 1998.
