= The Boss (1915 film) =

1915 film by Emile Chautard

- Directed by: Emile Chautard
- Based on: The Boss by Edward Sheldon
- Produced by: William A. Brady
- Starring: Holbrook Blinn; Alice Brady
- Cinematography: Lucien Tainguy
- Distributed by: World Film Company
- Release date: May 24, 1915
- Running time: 5 reels
- Country: United States
- Language: Silent film (English intertitles)

The Boss is a 1915 silent film produced by William A. Brady and released through his World Film Company. The film is based on a 1911 play by Edward Sheldon called The Boss. On stage it starred Holbrook Blinn and Emily Stevens. In this silent version Holbrook Blinn reprises his role from the Broadway play but Emily Stevens is replaced by Alice Brady, the daughter of producer William Brady. The Boss is considered a lost film.

== Cast ==
- Holbrook Blinn as Michael R. Regan
- Alice Brady as Emily Griswold
- William Marion as Archbishop Sullivan
- Charles S. Abbe as James D. Griswold
- Bert Starkey as Porkey McCoy
- Frederick Truesdell as Scanlan
- Julia Stuart as Mrs. Regan
- Douglas MacLean as Regan's Secretary, Robert (*as Douglas McLean)
- R. B. Mantell Jr. as Regan's Butler, Gates
