= June Elvidge =

American actress (1893–1965)

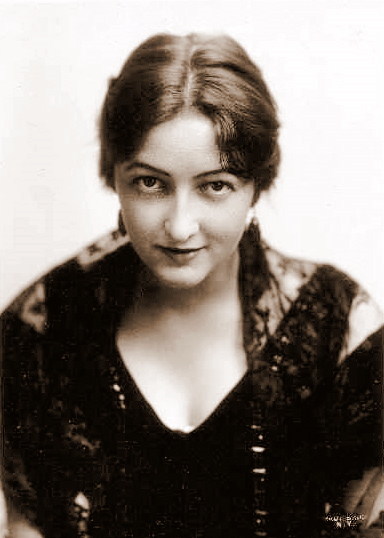
- Elvidge, c. 1920
- Born: June 30, 1893; St. Paul, Minnesota, U.S.
- Died: May 1, 1965 (aged 71); Eatontown, New Jersey, U.S.
- Occupation: Actress
- Years active: 1914–1925
- Spouse: Britton Busch

June Elvidge (June 30, 1893 – May 1, 1965) was an American actress. A native of St. Paul, Minnesota, she began her career as a musical theatre actress on Broadway in 1910s; working for the Shubert family in The Whirl of the World and The Passing Show of 1914. In 1915 she joined the World Film Company, and was active as a silent film actress from 1915 through 1924.

== Biography ==
June Elvidge was born in St. Paul, Minnesota on June 30, 1893. She was of English and Irish descent, attended Pennsylvania College (now Gettysburg College) and was a concert singer before she began acting. In 1914 she was hired by the Shubert family as a chorus girl in the Broadway musical revue The Whirl of the World. This was followed by the supporting role of Miss Leads in another one of their Broadway revues, The Passing Show of 1914. It was produced by the Shubert brothers at the Winter Garden Theatre in New York City. She eventually took over the lead role of Kitty MacKay (replacing José Collins) which was her big break. She subsequently toured in this production. She later returned to Broadway in 1920 as Nina Romain in Victor Herbert's The Girl in the Spotlight at the Knickerbocker Theatre. In 1924 she performed in the revue Darktown Bazaar.

Elvidge joined the World Film Company in 1915 for work as a silent film actress. Her film debut occurred in The Lure of Woman (1915). She portrayed a vamp in this film; a character type she was associated with. She played vamps in The Poison Pen (1919) and Forsaking All Others (1922) among other movies. She appeared in Westerns such as The Price of Pride (1917) and The Law of the Yukon (1920). She acted in seventy motion pictures before the beginning of the sound era. After the conclusion of her movie career in 1924, Elvidge toured America on the Orpheum Circuit, Inc., in vaudeville. She retired from show business around 1925.

Elvidge died on May 1, 1965 at the Mary Lee Nursing Home in Eatontown, New Jersey. She was 71 years old, the widow of Britton Busch, a stockbroker.

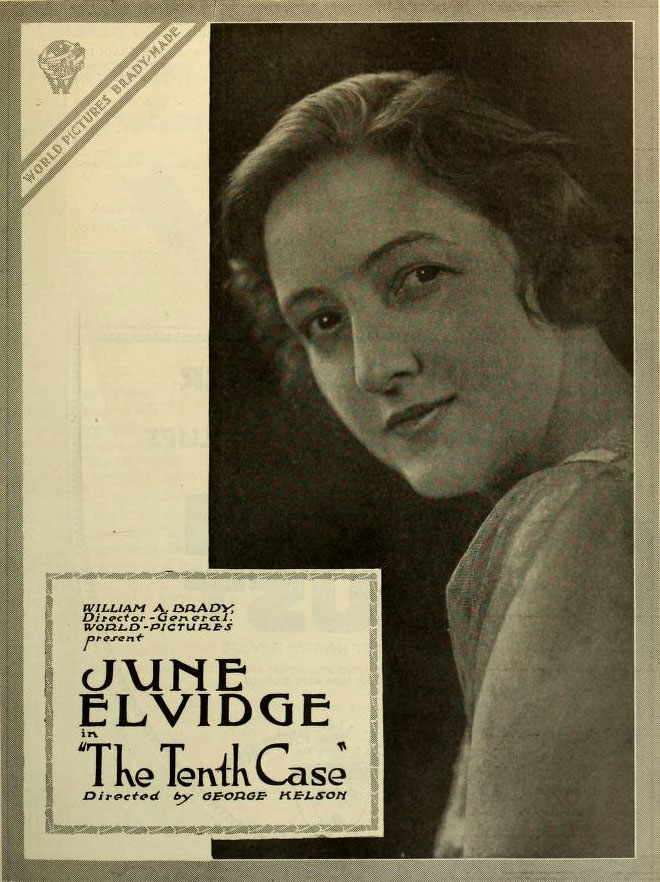
The Tenth Case (1917)

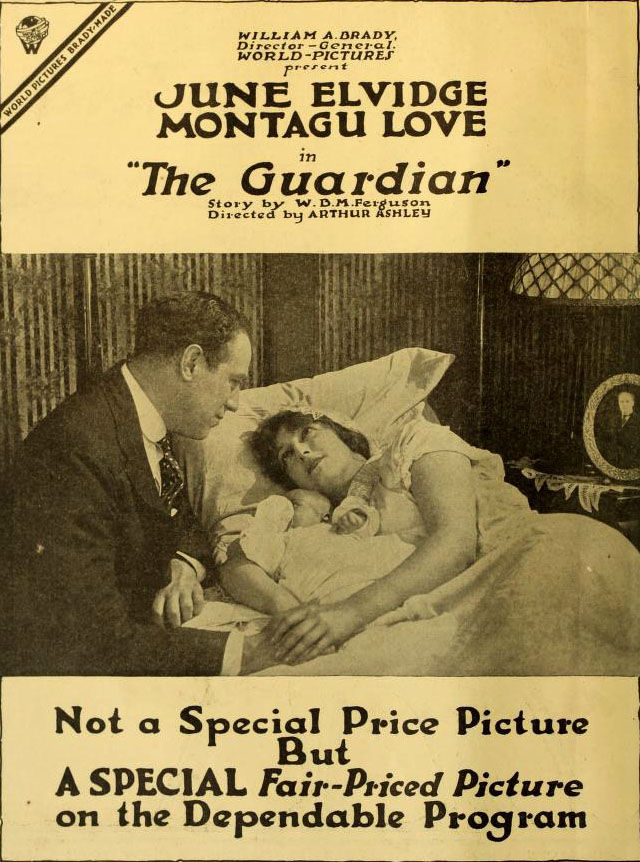
The Guardian (1917)

== Filmography ==
- A Butterfly on the Wheel (1915)
- The Rack (1915)
- The Flash of an Emerald (1915)
- Paying the Price (1916)
- La vie de Bohème (1916)
- Love's Crucible (1916)
- Fate's Boomerang (1916)
- The Almighty Dollar (1916)
- The Hand of Peril (1916)
- The World Against Him (1916)
- The Volunteer (1917)
- The Price of Pride (1917)
- A Girl's Folly (1917)
- The Marriage Market (1917)
- The Family Honor (1917)
- The Social Leper (1917)
- The Tenth Case (1917)
- The Strong Way (1917)
- Youth (1917)
- The Page Mystery (1917)
- A Square Deal (1917)
- Shall We Forgive Her? (1917)
- The Red Woman (1917)
- The Crimson Dove (1917)
- The Whip (1917)
- The Guardian (1917)
- Rasputin, The Black Monk (1917)
- The Cabaret (1918)
- The Beautiful Mrs. Reynolds (1918)
- The Appearance of Evil (1918)
- Joan of the Woods (1918)
- Stolen Orders (1918)
- The Way Out (1918)
- The Power and the Glory (1918)
- The Oldest Law (1918)
- Broken Ties (1918)
- A Woman of Redemption (1918)
- The Zero Hour (1918)
- The Quickening Flame (1919)
- The Bluffer (1919)
- Coax Me (1919)
- Love and the Woman (1919)
- The Love Defender (1919)
- Three Green Eyes (1919)
- The Steel King (1919)
- His Father's Wife (1919)
- The Social Pirate (1919)
- The Moral Deadline (1919)
- Almost Married (1919)
- The Poison Pen (1919)
- The Woman of Lies (1919)
- The Law of the Yukon (1920)
- Fine Feathers (1921)
- Beauty's Worth (1922)
- Beyond the Rocks (1922)
- The Impossible Mrs. Bellew (1922)
- The Man Who Saw Tomorrow (1922)
- The Power of a Lie (1922)
- Quincy Adams Sawyer (1922)
- Thelma (1922)
- Forsaking All Others (1922)
- The Woman Conquers (1922)
- The Eleventh Hour (1923)
- The Prisoner (1923)
- Temptation (1923)
- The Dancer of the Nile (1923)
- Painted People (1924)
- Pagan Passions (1924)
- The Right of the Strongest (1924)
- The Torrent (1924)
- Chalk Marks (1924)
