= Flaming Fury =

Flaming Fury can refer to:

- Flaming Fury (1926 film), a 1926 film
- Flaming Fury (1949 film), a 1949 film
