= The Family Honor (1917 film) =

1917 film

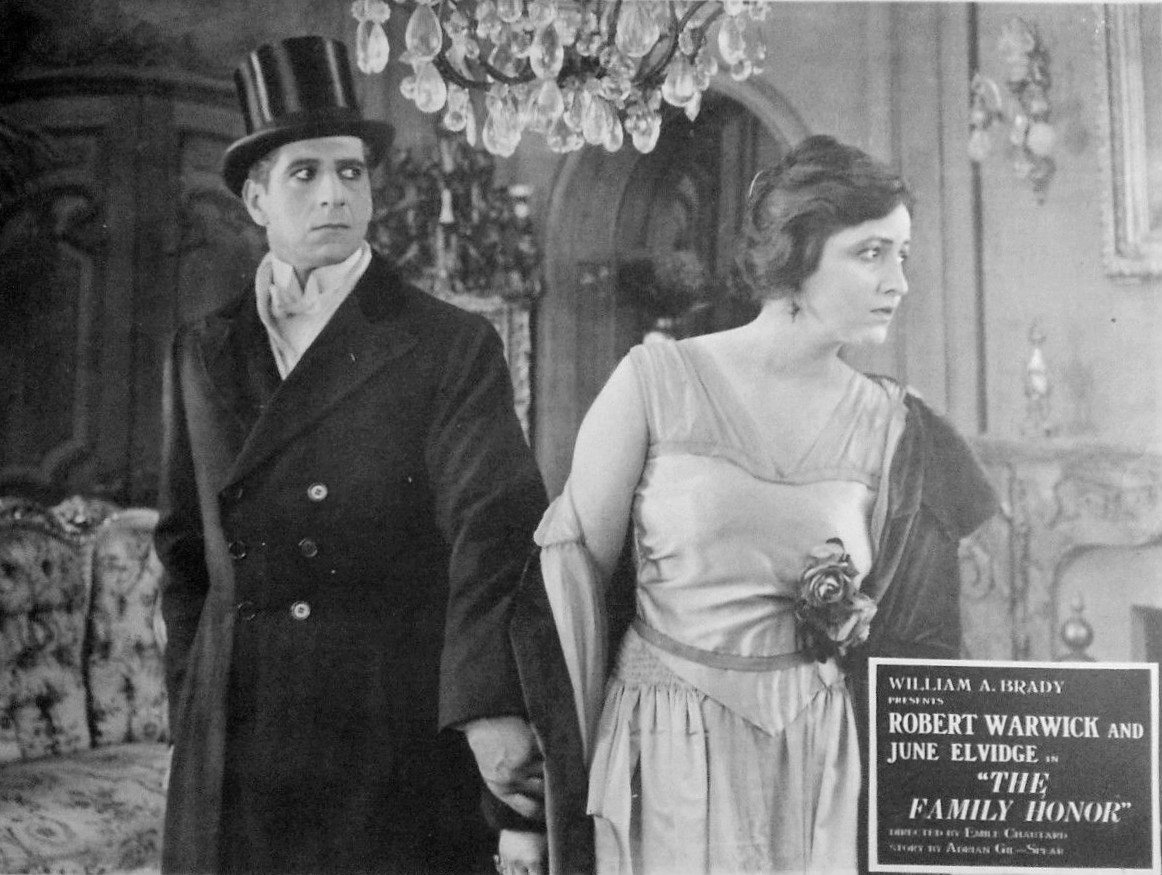
- Directed by: Emile Chautard
- Written by: Adrian Gil-Spear
- Produced by: William A. Brady
- Starring: Robert Warwick; June Elvidge; Henry Hull
- Cinematography: Lucien Tainguy
- Production company: Peerless Productions
- Distributed by: World Film
- Release date: April 9, 1917
- Running time: 5 reels
- Country: United States
- Languages: Silent; English intertitles

The Family Honor is a 1917 American silent drama film directed by Emile Chautard and starring Robert Warwick, June Elvidge and Henry Hull.

== Cast ==
- Robert Warwick as Captain Stephen Wayne
- June Elvidge as Marcia Quesnay
- Alec B. Francis as General Jason Wayne
- Henry Hull as Anthony Wayne
- Gerda Holmes as Doris Leighton
- Frank Beamish as Eric Mainwaring

== Bibliography ==
- Larry Langman. Destination Hollywood: The Influence of Europeans on American Filmmaking. McFarland, 2000.
