= The Red Woman (film) =

1917 film

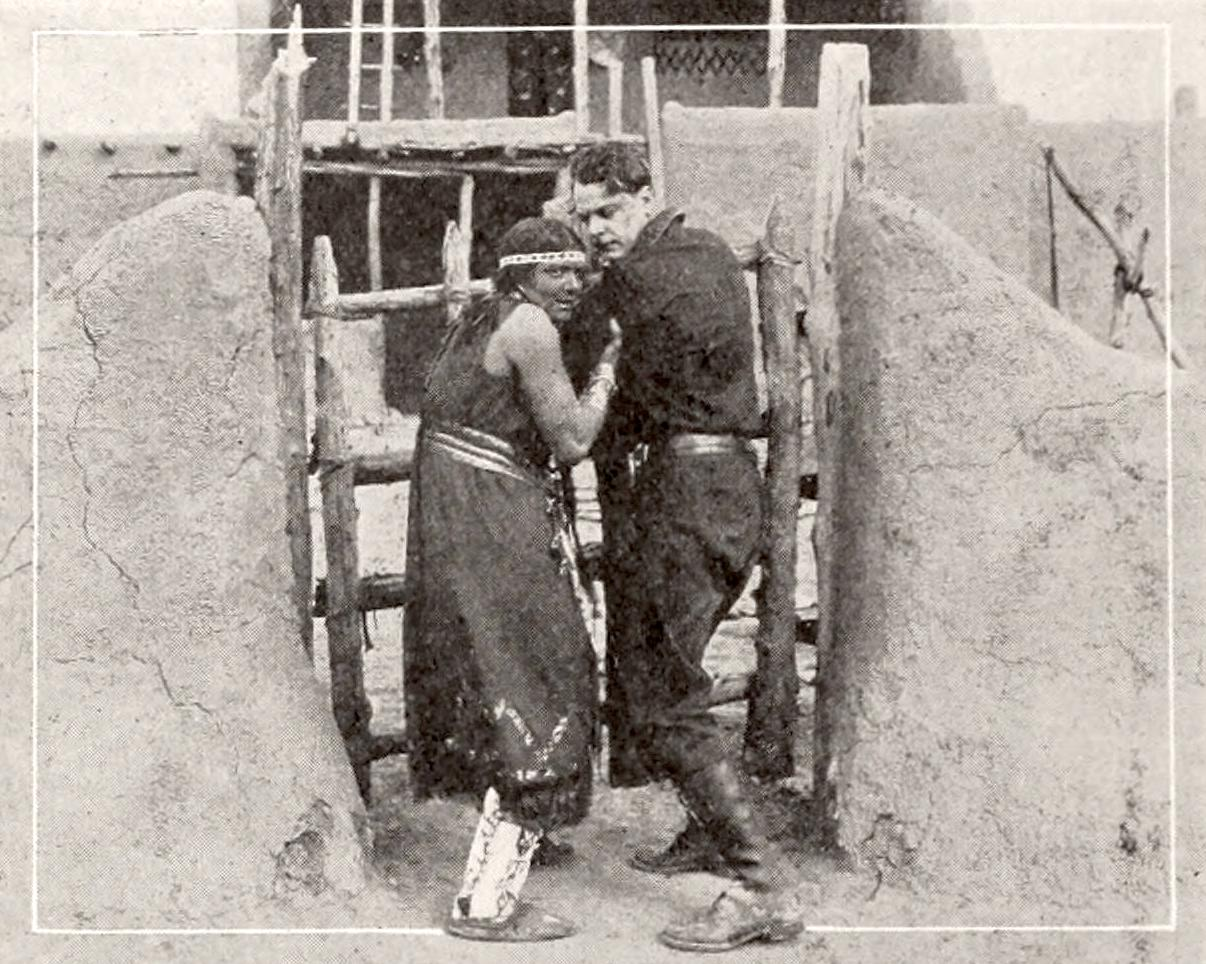
- Publicity photo
- Directed by: Harry R. Durant
- Produced by: Harry Ward; William A. Brady
- Starring: Gail Kane; Mahlon Hamilton; June Elvidge
- Production company: World Film
- Distributed by: World Film
- Release date: February 12, 1917
- Running time: 5 reels
- Country: United States
- Languages: Silent; English intertitles

The Red Woman is a 1917 American silent Western film directed by Harry R. Durant and starring Gail Kane, Mahlon Hamilton and June Elvidge.

== Plot ==
The head character, Morton Dean, is a spoiled child of a rich landowner. His father wants him to take responsibility and attempts to send him to New Mexico to manage some of his mines. The son refuses, focusing on his upcoming marriage to the socialite Dora Wendell. He eventually discovers that she is only interested in him for his wealth, but do to his refusal to follow his father's wishes he is cut away from his inheritance. He travels to New Mexico where he meets, falls in love, and fathers a child with an Eastern educated native woman.

== Cast ==
- Gail Kane as Maria Temosach
- Mahlon Hamilton as Morton Deal
- Edward Roseman as Sancho
- June Elvidge as Dora Wendell
- Charlotte Granville as Her Mother
- Gladys Earlcott as Chica

== Bibliography ==
- Angela Aleiss. Making the White Man's Indian: Native Americans and Hollywood Movies. Greenwood Publishing Group, 2005.
