= The Cowardly Way =

1915 film by John Ince

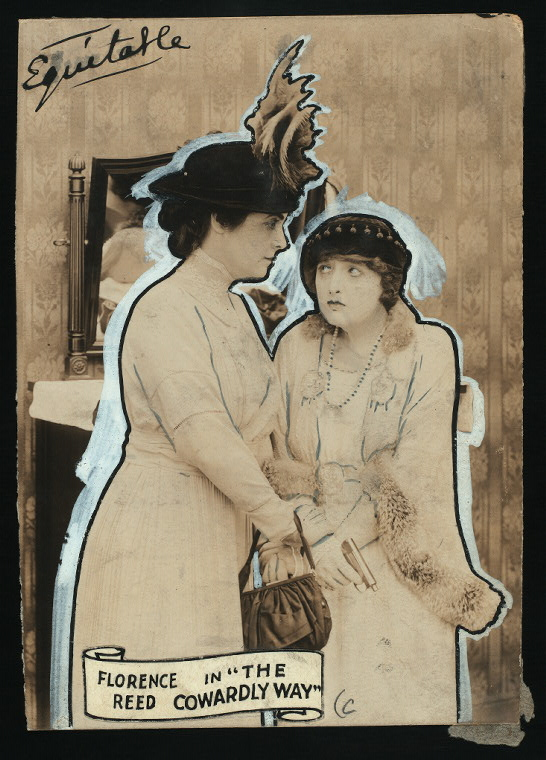
- Directed by: John Ince
- Written by: Marc Edmund Jones
- Starring: Florence Reed
- Cinematography: William Black
- Production company: Equitable Motion Pictures Corporation
- Distributed by: World Film Company
- Release date: November 15, 1915
- Running time: 5 reels
- Country: United States
- Language: Silent...English intertitles

The Cowardly Way is a lost 1915 American silent drama film directed by John Ince and starring Florence Reed. The film had 5 reels.

The AFI catalog lists various contemporary reviews and reports: "While reviews were generally positive, several critics focused on the film’s mystical aspects, which they assumed would be difficult for some members of the public to comprehend."

== Plot ==
According to the AFI, the plot revolved around Hack Harcourt, a poor man who marries a rich girl, Eunice Fielding.

== Cast ==
- Florence Reed - Eunice Fielding
- Isabel MacGregor - Marjorie Harcourt
- Maude Hill - Nance St. Germain
- Bennett Southard - Hack Harcourt
- Ferdinand Tidmarsh - Bob Fisher
