= A Square Deal =

1917 film directed by Harley Knoles

- Directed by: Harley Knoles
- Written by: L. V. Jefferson (story); Frances Marion
- Produced by: William A. Brady
- Starring: Carlyle Blackwell; June Elvidge; Henry Hull
- Cinematography: Arthur Edeson
- Production company: Peerless Productions
- Distributed by: World Film
- Release date: February 19, 1917
- Running time: 50 minutes
- Country: United States
- Languages: Silent; English intertitles

A Square Deal is a 1917 American silent drama film directed by Harley Knoles and starring Carlyle Blackwell, June Elvidge and Henry Hull.

== Cast ==
- Carlyle Blackwell as Hugh Eltinge
- June Elvidge as Doris Golden
- Henry Hull as Mark Dunbar
- Muriel Ostriche as Ruby Trailes
- Charlotte Granville as Mrs. Trailes
- Charles W. Charles as Hans

== Bibliography ==
- Goble, Alan. The Complete Index to Literary Sources in Film. Walter de Gruyter, 1999.
