= Henry Hull =

American actor (1890–1977)

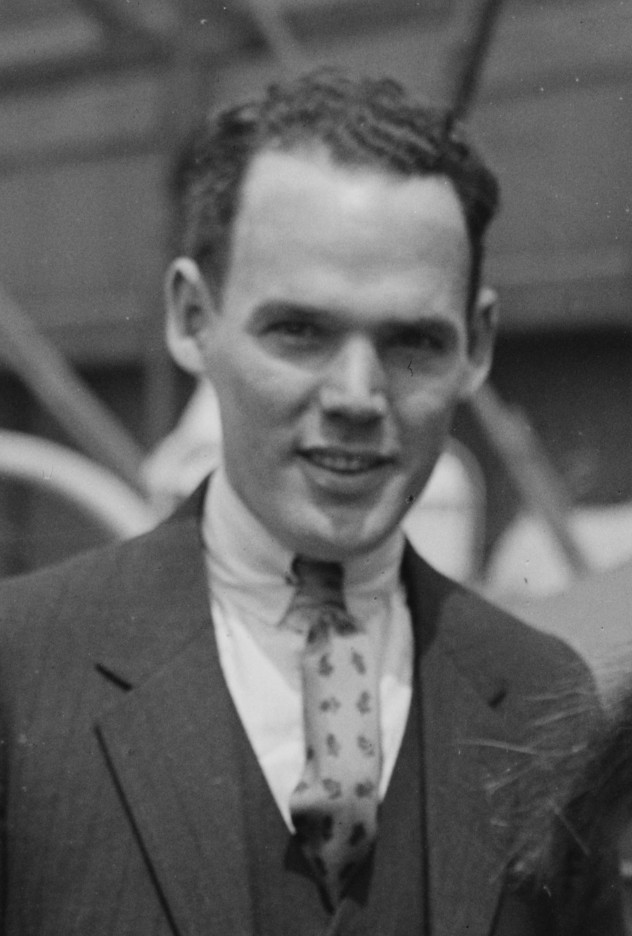
- Hull in 1923
- Born: Henry Watterson Hull; October 3, 1890; Louisville, Kentucky, U.S.
- Died: March 8, 1977 (aged 86); Cornwall, England, UK.
- Occupation: Actor
- Years active: 1910–1966
- Spouse: Juliet van Wyck Fremont (m. 1913; died 1971)
- Children: 3

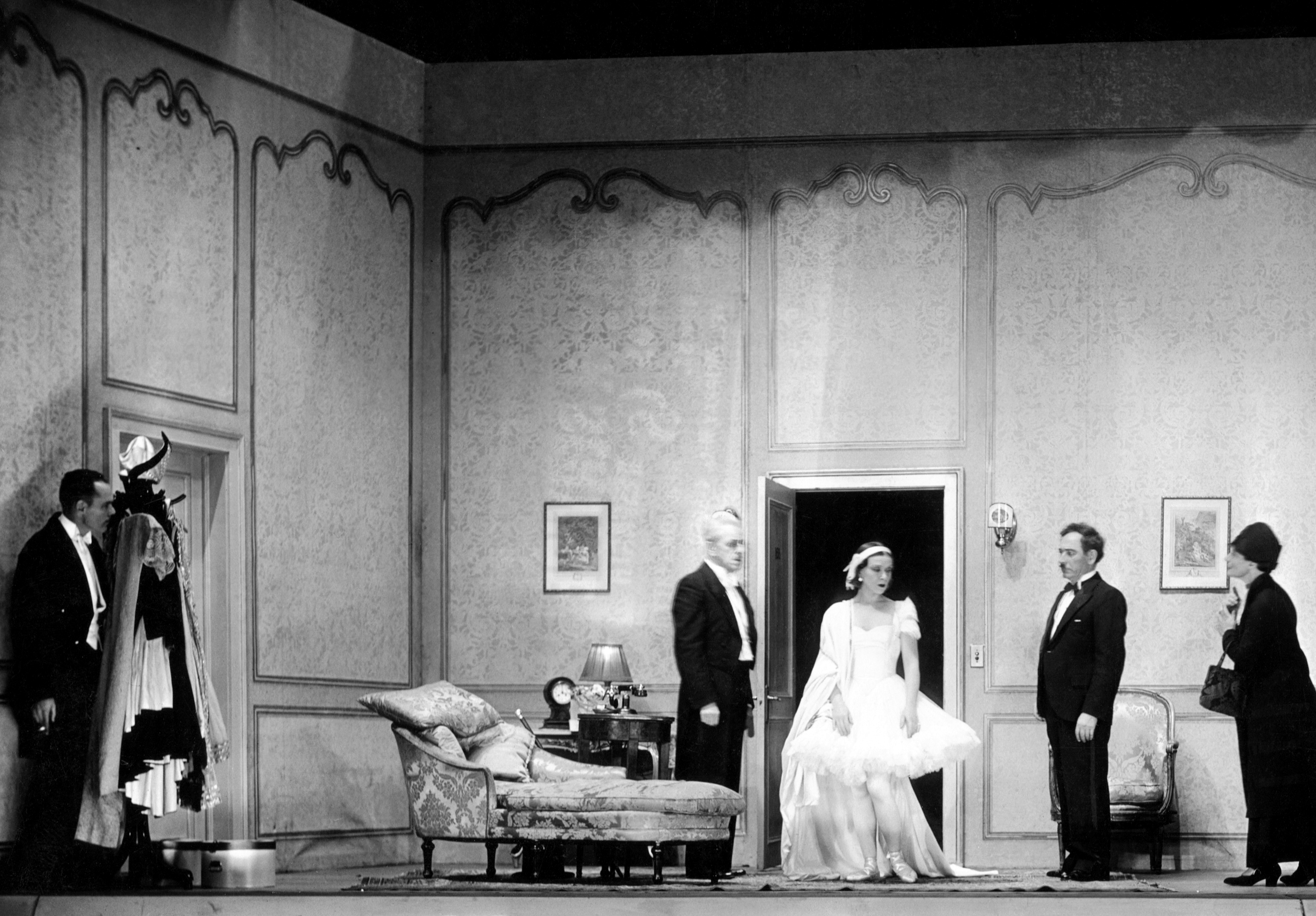
From the original Broadway production of Grand Hotel, L-R: Henry Hull, William Nunn, Eugenie Leontovich, Lester Alden, and Rafaela Ottiano (1930).

Henry Watterson Hull (October 3, 1890 – March 8, 1977) was an American character actor who played the lead in Universal Pictures's Werewolf of London (1935). For most of his career, he was a lead actor on stage and a character actor on screen.

== Early years ==
Hull was born in Louisville, Kentucky, the youngest of four children born to William Madison Hull, a theater manager and his wife, Elinor Bond Vaughn. He was named for his godfather, Pulitzer Prize-winning Louisville journalist Henry Watterson.

William Hull had been a drama critic in Louisville, and became a press agent for David Belasco after the family moved to New York City in 1902. Hull attended DeWitt Clinton High School and the High School of Commerce. Hull studied engineering at Columbia and was graduated from Cooper Union. In 1910, the family settled in Barkhamsted, Connecticut.

== Career ==
=== Stage ===
Impressed by his brother Shelly's acting career, in 1912, Hull joined the Greek Repertory Company run by his sister-in-law Margaret Anglin, who was married to his brother Howard. Anglin's touring company specialized in productions of Greek tragedies. In 1913, he returned to New York City to appear on Broadway in John Frederick Ballard's Believe Me, Xantippe with John Barrymore.

Early in his career, Hull appeared frequently on Broadway. In 1916, Hull and his wife, Juliet Fremont, appeared in The Man Who Came Back at the Playhouse Theatre. The play was very successful and ran for more than a year. In 1919, he was at the Broadhurst Theatre in 39 East with Tallulah Bankhead.

Hull created the role of Jeeter Lester in the long-running play Tobacco Road (1933), based on the novel by Erskine Caldwell. In 1956, Hull toured in a one-man show, doing readings from the works of Mark Twain. Hull had met Twain in Louisville when visiting Henry Watterson.

=== Film ===
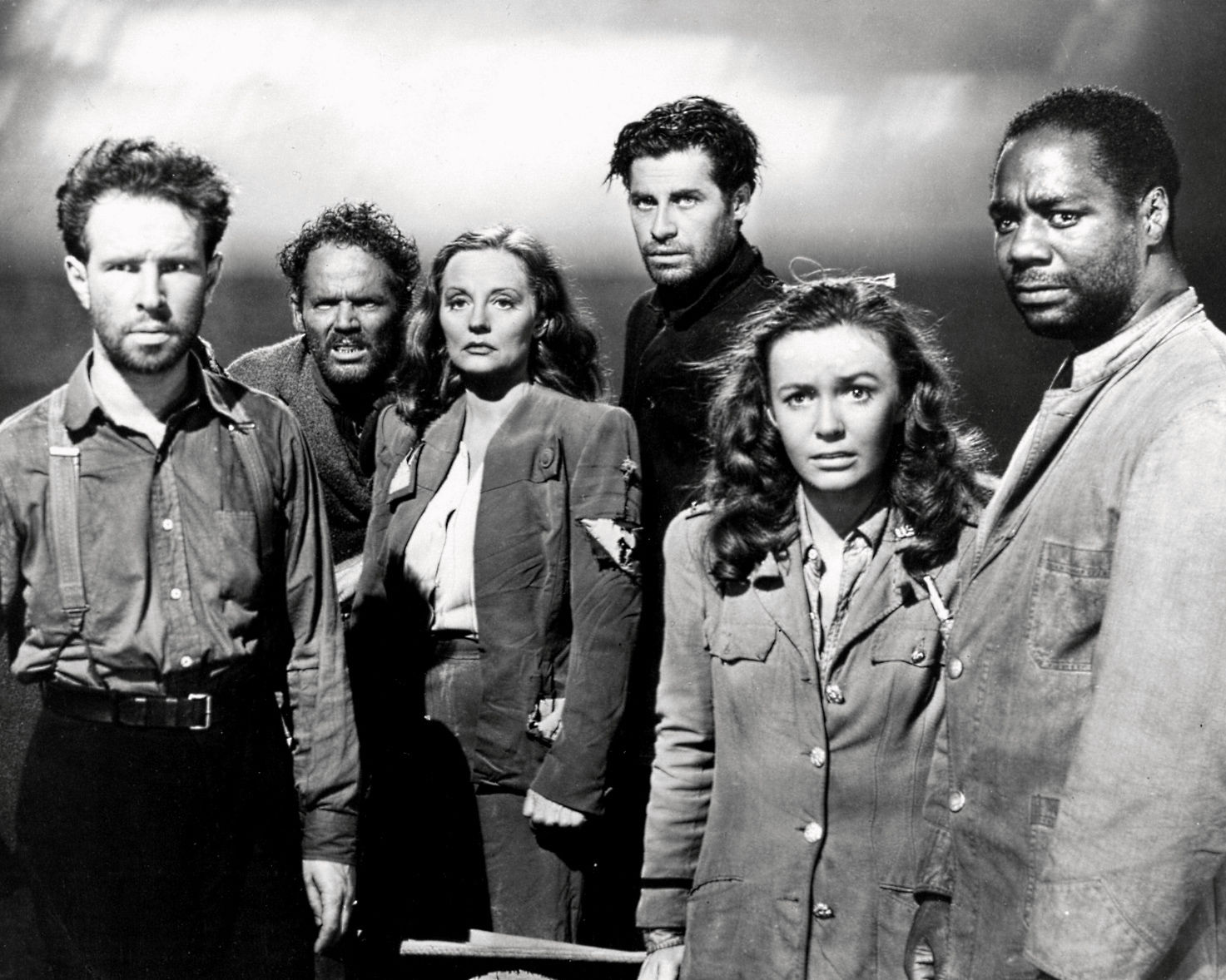
Hitchcock's Lifeboat (1944) with Hume Cronyn, Hull, Tallulah Bankhead, John Hodiak, Mary Anderson, and Canada Lee

Hull appeared in 74 films between 1917 and 1966, often playing supporting characters such as the uncle of Tyrone Power's love interest Nancy Kelly in Jesse James (1939). He appeared as Charles Rittenhouse, a wealthy industrialist in Alfred Hitchcock's Lifeboat (1944). Some of his other notable roles were as Abel Magwitch in the 1934 version of Great Expectations and in the last film of director Tod Browning, Miracles for Sale (1939). He starred in Werewolf of London in 1935.

Hull played the role of aging architect Henry Cameron (the mentor to Howard Roark) in The Fountainhead. Hull portrayed a doctor to whom Humphrey Bogart goes for help in High Sierra and was also cast in Colorado Territory, a Western remake of the High Sierra story starring Joel McCrea. He played a desert prospector who comes to Robert Ryan's rescue in Inferno in 1953.

He guest-starred on CBS's Appointment with Adventure, John Payne's NBC Western series titled The Restless Gun, and the syndicated crime drama U.S. Marshal. In 1958, he was featured in Robert Culp's Western series, Trackdown as Moss in the episode "Three Legged Fox". In 1959, he played the part of Obadiah on Wagon Train, season two, episode 14, "The Kitty Angel Story". In 1960, Hull played Mark Applewhite in the S3 EP29 “Trial for Murder”.

In 1960, Hull appeared on Bonanza twice, in the episode "The Gunmen" as Sheriff B. Banneman, and a scout for General John Charles Fremont (who, in real life, was the grandfather of Hull's wife) in the episode "The Mission".

On December 13, 1960, Hull guest-starred on NBC's Laramie as an embittered rancher, Ben Parkinson, who challenges Slim Sherman, played by series star John Smith, to a duel after Parkinson's youngest son accidentally kills himself on Sherman ranch land. Ron Harper portrays Parkinson's other son, Tom.

Hull also guest-starred in the series finale of Laramie, the episode "The Road to Helena" (May 21, 1963). Series character Slim Sherman, while in Cody, Wyoming, is hired by David Franklin, played by Hull, and his barmaid daughter, Ruth, portrayed by Maggie Pierce, to guide the pair to Helena, Montana, so Franklin can return money that he had previously stolen. John M. Pickard also appears in this episode.

Hull's last film was The Chase (1966) with Marlon Brando and Robert Redford.

== Family ==
Hull died in Cornwall, United Kingdom, at his daughter's residence on March 8, 1977.

Hull was quoted as saying he owed all his dramatic training to Anglin, with whom he had acted on stage. The middle brother, Shelley Hull, was a popular leading man who costarred in Why Marry?, the first play to win the Pulitzer Prize for Drama. He fell ill during the run of his biggest hit – the WWI play Under Orders – and died of influenza at 34 on January 14, 1919, during the Spanish influenza epidemic. Shelley's widow, Josephine Hull (1877–1957), was a successful stage performer throughout her long life and became an Oscar-winning character actress.

Henry Hull family tree

Thomas Hart Benton, U.S. Senator ("Old Bullion"); 1782-1858	Elizabeth Preston Benton; 1794-1854
Maj. Gen. John Charles Frémont, "The Pathfinder"; 1813-1890	Jessie Benton; 1824-1902
John Charles Frémont, Jr. 1853-?	Sarah Frémont (Anderson) c. 1856-1946	William Madison Hull; 1857-?	Elinor Bond Hull (Vaughn); 1859-?
Juliet Van Wyck Hull (Frémont); 1886-1971	Henry Hull; 1890-1977	Howard Hull; 1880-1937	Margaret Anglin; 1876-1958	Shelley Hull; 1884-1919	Josephine Hull (née Sherwood); 1877-1957
Henry Jr.	Shelley	Joan

== Filmography ==
Year	Title	Role	Director	Notes
1917	A Square Deal	Mark Dunbar	Harley Knoles	Lost film
1917	The Family Honor	Anthony Wayne	Emile Chautard	Lost film
1917	Rasputin, the Black Monk	Kerensky	Arthur Ashley	Lost film
1917	The Volunteer	Jonathan Mendenhall	Harley Knoles	Lost film
1918	Little Women	John Brooke	Harley Knoles	Lost film
1922	One Exciting Night	John Fairfax	D. W. Griffith	
1923	The Last Moment	Hercules Napolean Cameron	J. Parker Read Jr.	Lost film
1923	A Bride for a Knight	Jimmy Poe		Lost film
1924	Roulette	Jimmy Moore	Stanner E.V. Taylor	Lost film
1924	The Hoosier Schoolmaster	Ralph Hartsook	Oliver L. Sellers	Incomplete film
1924	For Woman's Favor	The Fool / The Lover	O. A. C. Lund	Lost film
1925	Wasted Lives		John Gorman	Lost film
1925	The Wrongdoers		Hugh Dierker	Lost film
1934	Midnight	Nolan	Chester Erskine	
1934	Great Expectations	Abel Magwitch	Stuart Walker	
1935	Transient Lady	Sen. Hamp Baxter	Edward Buzzell	
1935	Werewolf of London	Dr. Glendon	Stuart Walker	
1938	Paradise for Three	Sepp	Edward Buzzell	
1938	Yellow Jack	Dr. Jesse Lazear	George B. Seitz	
1938	Three Comrades	Dr. Becker	Frank Borzage	
1938	Port of Seven Seas	Uncle Elzear	James Whale	Uncredited
1938	Boys Town	Dave Morris	Norman Taurog	
1938	The Great Waltz	Franz Josef	Josef von Sternberg (uncredited)	
1939	Jesse James	Major Rufus Cobb	Henry King	
1939	The Spirit of Culver	Doc Allen	Joseph Santley	
1939	Return of the Cisco Kid	Colonel Joshua Bixby	Herbert I. Leeds	
1939	Stanley and Livingstone	James Gordon	Otto Brower (safari sequences)	
1939	Miracles for Sale	Dave Duvallo	Tod Browning	
1939	Babes in Arms	Madox		
1939	Bad Little Angel	Red Wilks	Wilhelm Thiele	
1939	Nick Carter, Master Detective	John A. Keller	Jacques Tourneur	
1939	Judge Hardy and Son	Dr. Jones	George B. Seitz	
1940	My Son, My Son!	Dermot O'Riordan	Charles Vidor	
1940	The Return of Frank James	Major Rufus Cobb	Fritz Lang	
1941	High Sierra	Doc Banton	Raoul Walsh	
1943	The West Side Kid	Sam Winston	George Sherman	
1943	Seeds of Freedom	Guerilla Leader		
1943	The Woman of the Town	Inky Wilkenson	George Archainbaud	
1944	Lifeboat	Charles J. Rittenhouse	Alfred Hitchcock	
1944	Goodnight Sweetheart	Jeff Parker	Joseph Santley	
1945	Objective, Burma!	Mark Williams	Raoul Walsh	
1947	High Barbaree	Dr. William G. Brooke	Jack Conway	
1947	Deep Valley	Cliff Saul	Jean Negulesco	
1947	Mourning Becomes Electra	Seth Beckwick	Dudley Nichols	
1948	On Our Merry Way	Dying Man	King Vidor	Uncredited; deleted sequence
1948	Scudda Hoo! Scudda Hay!	Milt Dominy	F. Hugh Herbert	
1948	The Walls of Jericho	Jefferson Norman	John M. Stahl	
1948	Belle Starr's Daughter	Old Marshall	Lesley Selander	Uncredited
1948	Fighter Squadron	Brig. Gen. Mike McCready	Raoul Walsh	
1948	Portrait of Jennie	Eke	William Dieterle	
1949	El Paso	Judge Henry Jeffers	Lewis R. Foster	
1949	Rimfire	Nathaniel Greeley	B. Reeves Eason	
1949	Colorado Territory	Fred Winslow	Raoul Walsh	
1949	The Fountainhead	Henry Cameron	King Vidor	
1949	The Great Gatsby	Dan Cody	Elliott Nugent	
1949	The Great Dan Patch	Dan Palmer	Joseph M. Newman	
1949	Song of Surrender	Deacon Parry	Mitchell Leisen	
1950	The Return of Jesse James	Hank Younger	Arthur Hilton(as Arthur David Hilton)	
1951	Hollywood Story	Vincent St. Clair	William Castle	
1952	The Treasure of Lost Canyon	Cousin Lucas Cooke	Ted Tetzlaff	
1953	The Last Posse	Ollie Stokley	Alfred L. Werker	
1953	Inferno	Sam Elby	Roy Ward Baker	
1953	Thunder Over the Plains	Lt. Col. Chandler	Andre de Toth	
1955	Kentucky Rifle	Preacher Bently	Carl K. Hittleman	
1955	Man with the Gun	Marshal Lee Sims	Richard Wilson	
1957	The Buckskin Lady	Doc Morley	Carl K. Hittleman	
1958	The Proud Rebel	Judge Morley	Michael Curtiz	
1958	The Sheriff of Fractured Jaw	Masters	Raoul Walsh	
1958	The Buccaneer	Ezra Peavey	Anthony Quinn	
1959	The Restless Gun	Old Jesse		Episode "The Last Gray Man"
1959	The Restless Gun	Doc Kemmer		Episode "Dead Man's Hand"
1959	The Restless Gun	Matt Harper		Episode "One on the House"
1959	The Oregon Trail	George Seton	Gene Fowler Jr.	
1961	Master of the World	Prudent	William Witney	
1965	The Fool Killer	Dirty Jim Jelliman	Servando González	
1966	The Chase	Briggs	Arthur Penn	(final film role)
