= Maxine Elliott Hicks =

American actress (1904–2000)

- Born: October 5, 1904; Denver, Colorado, U.S.
- Died: January 10, 2000 (aged 95); San Clemente, California, U.S.
- Occupation: Actress
- Years active: 1914–1994

Maxine Elliott Hicks (October 5, 1904 – January 10, 2000) was an American actress.

== Life and career ==
Maxine Elliott Hicks was born on October 5, 1904, in Denver, Colorado to George W. and Margaret Hicks. She began acting on the stage from the age of 5. As Maxine Hicks, she was a starlet of the silent film era, with over 200 credited and uncredited roles between 1914 and 1937. Hicks's film debut was in The Crimson Dove (1917), although one source reported that she was an extra in a 1914 film. She appeared as Felice, the daughter of Ethel Barrymore's character in the 1917 version of The Eternal Mother, and the nemesis Susie May Squoggs in The Poor Little Rich Girl.

Hicks successfully made the transition from silents into talking pictures but left acting in 1937 when she and her mother got into a dispute with Jack Warner, the head of Warner Bros. studio.

After a decades-long hiatus, she returned to acting in 1976 as Maxine Elliott, playing character parts in television shows such as All in the Family and had a recurring role in Just the Ten of Us. She also appeared in commercials and movies, including Defending Your Life.

Hicks was married to Frank Dodge from 1938 to 1948.

== Death ==
Hicks died at the age of 95 on January 10, 2000, in San Clemente, California. She was survived by three sons, seven grandchildren and five great-grandchildren. Her ashes are at Forest Lawn Cemetery in Hollywood Hills, California.

== Filmography ==
=== Films ===
| Year | Film | Role | Note |
|---|---|---|---|
| 1992 | Beethoven | Old Woman | |
| 1991 | The Linguini Incident | Old Woman | |
| 1991 | Defending Your Life | Elderly Woman on Tram | |
| 1990 | Nerds of a Feather | 150-year-old woman | |
| 1989 | Wicked Stepmother | Mathilda | |
| 1984 | Hollywood Hot Tubs | Sylvia | |
| 1937 | The Toast of New York | Mother | uncredited |
| 1936 | Ladies in Love | Girl in Audience | uncredited |
| 1936 | Private Number | Olga | |
| 1934 | One Hour Late | Elsie Kelsey | uncredited |
| 1934 | The Old Fashioned Way | Waitress | uncredited |
| 1929 | Navy Blues | Girl in Sweatshop | uncredited |
| 1925 | Enticement | Olicw Merley | |
| 1925 | The Thundering Herd | Sally Hudnall | |
| 1924 | The Age of Innocence | | |
| 1924 | Lover's Lane | Simplicity | |
| 1924 | Babbitt | Verona Babbitt | |
| 1924 | Happiness | | |
| 1924 | Through the Dark | | |
| 1923 | Reno | Mattie Hake | |
| 1923 | Woman-Proof | | |
| 1923 | The Midnight Alarm | Aggie | |
| 1923 | East Side - West Side | Kit Lamson | |
| 1921 | First Love | Speeder | |
| 1921 | Nobody's Kid | Pinky Moore | |
| 1920 | The Gilded Dream | Hicks | |
| 1920 | The County Fair | | |
| 1920 | Double Speed | | |
| 1919 | The Right to Happiness | Undetermined Role | |
| 1919 | An Innocent Adventuress | | |
| 1918 | Neighbors | Effie Harding | |
| 1917 | The Poor Little Rich Girl | Susie May Squoggs | |
| 1917 | The Crimson Dove | Minnie Zugg | |
| 1917 | Mary Jane's Pa | | |
| 1917 | The Eternal Mother | Felice | |
| 1917 | The Little Duchess | Sophia Dawson | |

=== Television ===
| Year | TV Series | Role | Note |
|---|---|---|---|
| 1994 | Thunder Alley | Older Woman | |
| 1994 | Frasier | Mrs. Grey | |
| 1991 | Nurses | Mrs. Heston | |
| 1991 | Growing Pains | Elderly Woman on Plane | |
| 1991 | Quantum Leap | Edwine | |
| 1989 | Growing Pains | Winnie | |
| 1988-1990 | Just the Ten of Us | Sister Ethel | 14 episodes |
| 1987 | Designing Women | Customer | |
| 1985 | Diff'rent Strokes | Mrs. Gail | |
| 1983 | Happy | Mrs. Fisher | TV movie |
| 1981 | It's a Living | Lady at Piano | |
| 1980 | Hello, Larry | Mrs. Simpson | |
| 1979 | The Jeffersons | Woman Picketer #1 | |
| 1978 | Rhoda | Erma | |
| 1978 | CHiPs | Elderly Woman | |
| 1977 | Phyllis | Abigail | |
| 1976 | All in the Family | Mrs. Bradley | |

=== Short films ===
| Year | Short Film | Role |
|---|---|---|
| 1914 | The Borrowed Finery | Dolly |
