= The Law of the Yukon =

1920 film

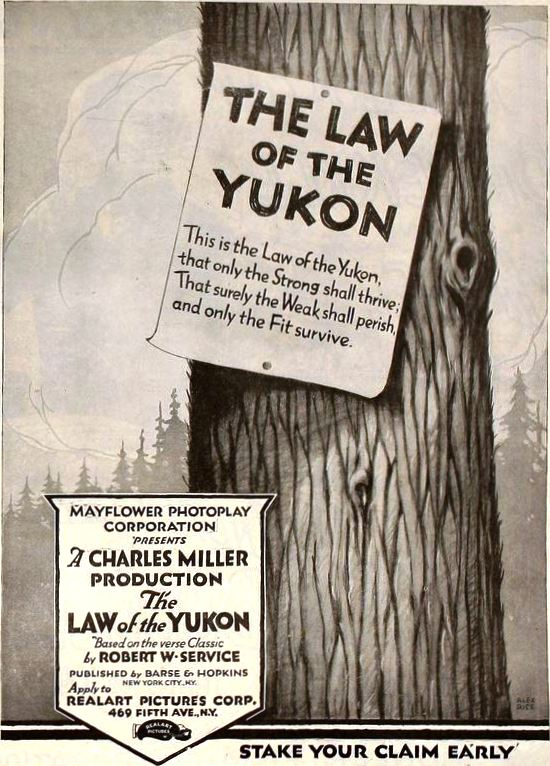
- Advertisement for film
- Directed by: Charles Miller
- Screenplay by: Harry Chandlee
- Based on: The Law of the Yukon by Robert W. Service
- Starring: June Elvidge; Edward Earle
- Cinematography: A. H. Vallet; Al Leach
- Production company: Mayflower Photoplay Company
- Distributed by: Realart Pictures Corporation
- Release date: September 1920
- Running time: Six reels
- Country: United States
- Language: Silent (English intertitles)

The Law of the Yukon is a 1920 American silent drama film inspired by the poem, The Law of The Yukon, by Robert W. Service. The film was directed by Charles Miller, and stars June Elvidge and Edward Earle.

== Plot ==
As described in a film magazine, Morgan Kleath, a young newspaper man from San Francisco, arrives in the Yukon to start a paper. His welcome is an insult from Joe Duke, a belligerent native, that results in the latter's first defeat and brews trouble to follow for Kleath. Goldie Meadows, the adopted daughter of Tim Meadows, keeper of the dance hall wins the heart of Kleath, increasing Duke's rage. A robbery instigated by associates of Duke leaves clues that point to Kleath as the guilty man. Claire Meredith, wife of Dr. Meredith, and Tiny Tess, a habitué of the dance hall, supply the weak souls to perish in the country's crushing power, and their two love affairs make side issues from the main romance of Kleath and Goldie. As the noose begins to threaten Kleath, his unfaithful wife arrives from 'Frisco to reveal his freedom from blame and breathes her last with the end of her testimony, permitting the union of the lovers.

== Cast ==
- Edward Earle as Morgan Kleath
- Joseph Smiley as Tim Meadows
- Nancy Deaver as Goldie
- June Elvidge as Mrs. Meredith
- Bigelow Cooper as Dr. Meredith
- Tom Velmar as Joe Duke
- Warburton Gamble as Medford Delaney
- Sara Biala as Kleath's wife
- Nadine Nash
- Tom O'Malley (credited as Thomas O'Malley)
- John Webb Dillon (credited as Jack Dillon)
- Bird Millman

== Production ==
Three months were spent on location at Port Henry, New York. Interiors were filmed at the local Artic City studio, which had been constructed only a year earlier.

== See also ==
- The Spell of the Yukon
- Songs of a Sourdough
