= Betty May (actress) =

American actress (1904–1949)

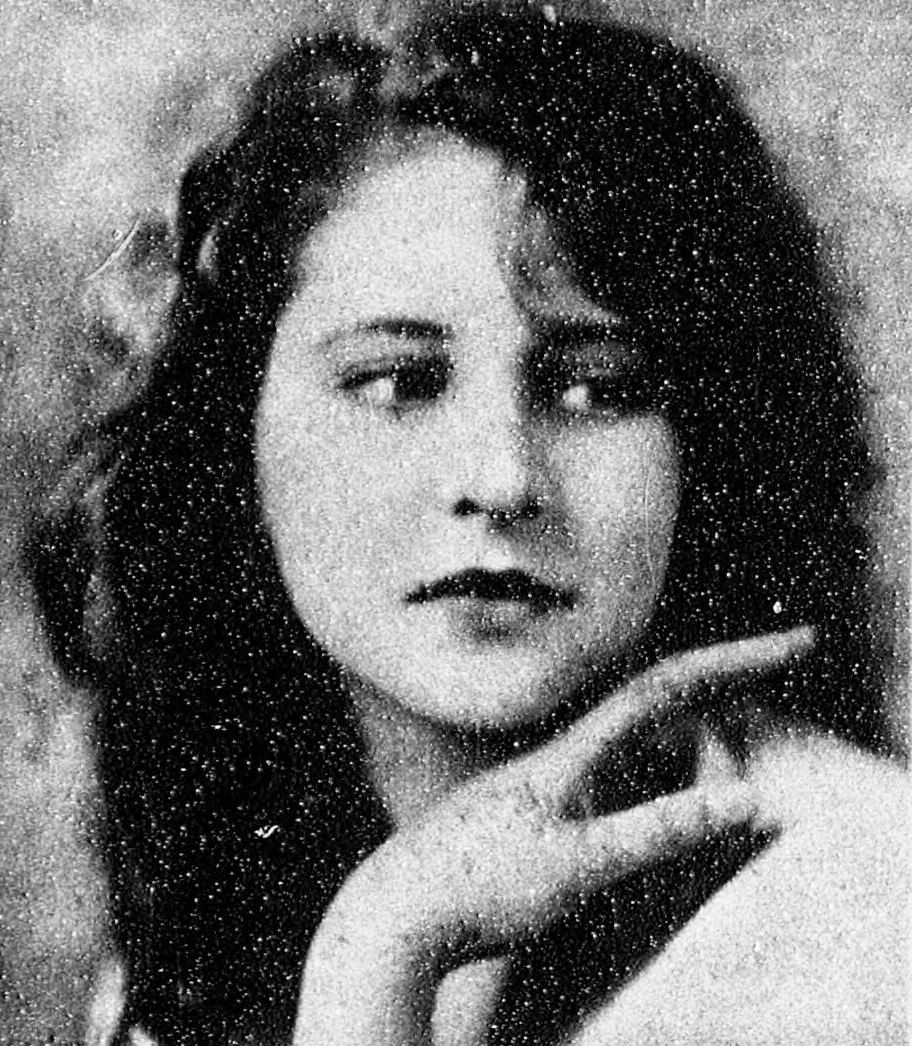
- May in 1922
- Born: Elizabeth Jane May; June 22, 1904; Cripple Creek, Colorado, US
- Died: November 13, 1949 (aged 45); Los Angeles, California, US

Elizabeth Jane May (June 22, 1904 – November 13, 1949), was an actress during the silent film era in America.

== Biography ==
Born on June 22, 1904, in Cripple Creek, Colorado, May worked in cinema from the early 1920s until 1936, appearing in at least sixteen films.

May made her first appearance for Century Comedy (also known as Century Comedies), a production company founded by Abe and Julius Stern. She was signed to a long-term contract by Julius Stern in 1922. She was described in trade publications at the time as "the Century beauty" who was cast in ingenue roles but who "shows the ability to do more ambitious roles".

Her debut was in the 1922 film Upper and Lower, a comedy directed by Alf Goulding. With Century Comedy Films, she appeared in several film with Lee Moran as the lead, as well as several starring "Queenie The Human Horse". By 1923, she had been contracted by Principal Pictures Corporations.

After 1931, May tended to only appear in small, often un-credited, roles. In 1937 she was interviewed by the San Bernardino Sun for an article about breaking into acting in Hollywood, where she mentions she is studying voice and diction in hopes of getting more roles.

She died in Los Angeles on November 13, 1949, aged 45, in Los Angeles.

== Filmography ==
- Upper and Lower (1922)
- Ten Seconds (1922)
- True Blue (1922 film) (1922)
- Me and My Mule (1922)
- The American Plan (film) (1923)
- The Home Plate (1923)
- Game Hunters (1923)
- East Side - West Side (1923)
- Love on the Rio Grande (1925)
- Flaming Fury (1926)
- Night Nurse (1931)
- Sisters Under the Skin (1934)
- Whom the Gods Destroy (1934)
- Broadway Bill (1934)
- Love Me Forever (1935)
- The Case of the Missing Man (1935)
- Dangerous Intrigue (1936)
