= Lovers' Lane (1924 film) =

1924 film by William Beaudine

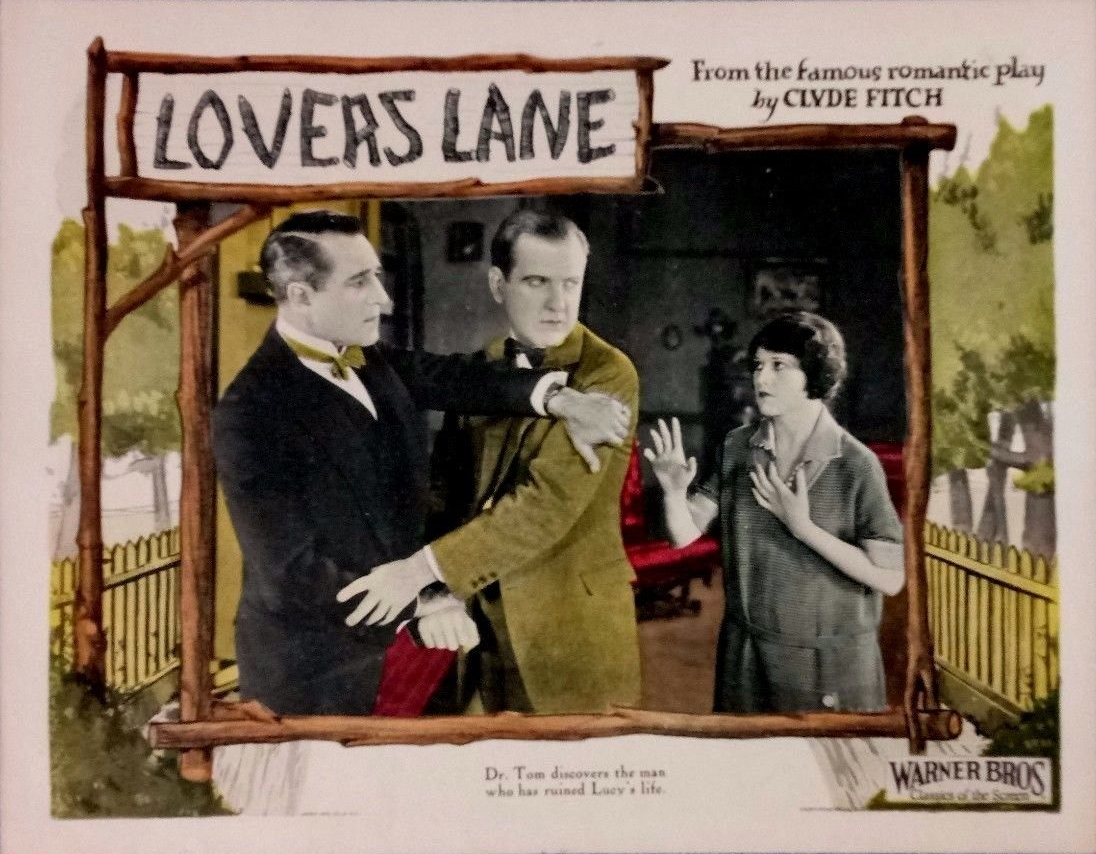
- Lobby card
- Directed by: Phil Rosen and William Beaudine (unconfirmed)
- Written by: Dorothy Farnum (adaptation)
- Based on: Lovers' Lane by Clyde Fitch
- Cinematography: Charles Van Enger
- Production company: Warner Bros.
- Distributed by: Warner Bros.
- Release date: August 10, 1924
- Running time: 53 minutes
- Country: United States
- Language: Silent (English intertitles)
- Budget: $69,000
- Box office: $201,000

Lovers' Lane is a 1924 American silent romantic comedy film based upon the play by Clyde Fitch and directed by Phil Rosen. It stars Robert Ellis and Gertrude Olmstead.

== Plot ==
As described in a review in a film magazine, when Dr. Singleton tells his sweetheart, Mary Larkin, that even though he loves her he will not surrender his practice in their small New England town, she becomes peeved and encourages a stranger. Dr. Stone, an old-timer and anti-modern method practitioner, has told a divorcee that her lame child is incurable. Singleton takes them both into his home and is successful in his operation upon the youngster. Mary decides to marry Woodbridge, the stranger, and calls upon Singleton's father, a local minister, to perform the ceremony. Tom is a witness, and when the divorcee is also called it develops that she divorced Woodbridge for non-support. Seeing his child Dick reunites Woodbridge and his former wife, and after that Dr. Singleton has everything his own way.

== Cast ==
- Robert Ellis as Dr. Tom Singleton
- Gertrude Olmstead as Mary Larkin
- Crauford Kent as Herbert Woodbridge
- Kate Toncray as Aunt Mattie
- George Periolat as Dr. Stone
- Norval MacGregor as Reverend Singleton
- Frances Dale as Mrs. Woodbridge
- Bruce Guerin as Dick Woodbridge
- Ethel Wales as Aunt Melissy
- Maxine Elliott Hicks as Simplicity
- Charles Sellon as Uncle Bill (as Charles A. Sellon)
- Aileen Manning as Miss Mealy
- Dorothy Vernon as Mrs. Stone

== Box-office ==
According to Warner Bros records the film earned $182,000 domestically and $19,000 foreign.

== Preservation status ==
Warner Bros. records of the film's negative have a notation, "Junked 12/27/48" (i.e. December 27, 1948). Warner Bros., destroyed many of its nitrate negatives in the late 1940s and 1950s due to the decomposition of its pre-1933 films. No prints of Lovers' Lane are known to exist and it is now considered to be a lost film.
