= Charlotte Granville =

British actress (1860–1942)

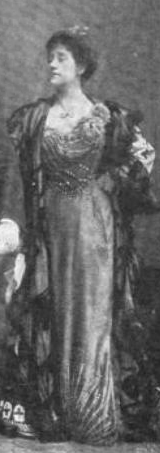
- As Mrs. Wuthering in the play The Wisdom of the Wise, 1901
- Born: Charlotte Stuart; 9 May 1860
- Died: 8 July 1942 (aged 82); Los Angeles, U.S.
- Occupation: Actress
- Years active: 1901–1936
- Spouse: Major Robert Follett Muter Foster Millington Synge (m. 1884; div. 1900)

Charlotte Granville (née Stuart; 9 May 1860 – 8 July 1942) was a British actress who starred in films from 1917 to 1936.

== Biography ==
Granville acted in Dublin with a company headed by George Alexander. She debuted on Broadway in Mr. Preedy and the Countess (1910), and her final Broadway performance was as Miss Attica Taylor in A Divine Moment (1934). She began her film career in The Red Woman (1917) and is known for her appearances in films such as Werewolf of London.

Granville married Major Robert Follett Muter Foster Millington Synge in September 1884. She sought a divorce from him in London on 26 April 1900.

She died on 8 July 1942 in Los Angeles at age 82.

== Filmography ==
- The Antics of Ann as Mrs. Bredwell (1917)
- A Square Deal as Mrs. Trailes (1917)
- The Red Woman as Her mother (1917)
- The Floor Below as Mrs. Mason (1918)
- The Impostor as Mrs. Walford (1918)
- The Girl and the Judge as Mrs. Stanton (1918)
- A Damsel in Distress as Mrs. Caroline Byng (1919)
- 24 Hours as Savina Jerrold (1931)
- Just a Gigolo as Lady Jane Hartley (1931)
- Behold my Wife! as Mrs. Sykes (1934)
- Now and Forever as Mrs. J. H. P. Crane (1934)
- Werewolf of London as Lady Forsythe (1935)
- Rose of the Rancho as Doña Petrona (1936)
