= The Floor Below =

1918 film by Clarence G. Badger

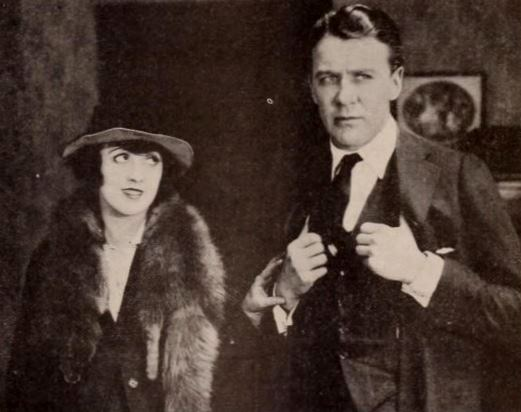
- Mabel Normand and Tom Moore
- Directed by: Clarence G. Badger
- Story by: Elaine S. Carrington (as Elaine Sterne)
- Produced by: Samuel Goldwyn
- Starring: Mabel Normand; Tom Moore; Helen Dahl
- Cinematography: Oliver T. Marsh
- Production company: Goldwyn Pictures Corporation
- Release date: March 10, 1918
- Running time: 1 hour (6 reels)
- Country: United States
- Languages: Silent; English intertitles

The Floor Below (1918; Dutch intertitles)

The Floor Below is a 1918 American silent comedy-drama film starring Mabel Normand, Tom Moore and Helen Dahl. It was long thought lost, until a print was found "in the estate of a Dutch collector" by the Nederlands Filmmuseum.

== Cast ==
- Mabel Normand as Patricia O'Rourke
- Tom Moore as Hunter Mason
- Helen Dahl as Louise Vane
- Wallace McCutcheon, Jr. as Monty Latham
- Lincoln Plumer as Uncle Amos
- Charlotte Granville as Mrs. Mason
- Romaine Callender as Ziegler
- Louis R. Grisel as Stubbs
- Willard Dashiell as Managing Editor
- Tex Charwate
- William Black (as W. W. Black)
- Lorraine Harding (according to IMDb)
- Herbert Rawlinson (according to silentera.com)
