= A Girl's Folly =

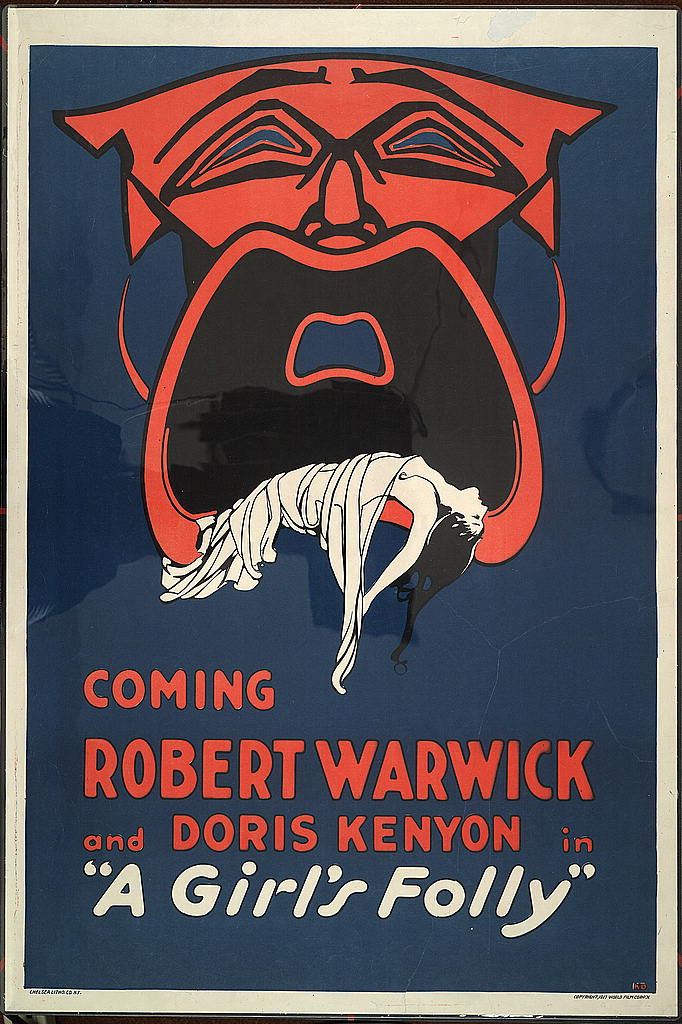
- Theatrical release poster
- Directed by: Maurice Tourneur
- Written by: Frances Marion
- Starring: Robert Warwick; Doris Kenyon
- Cinematography: John van den Broek
- Edited by: Clarence Brown
- Production company: Paragon Films
- Distributed by: World Film Company
- Release date: February 26, 1917
- Running time: 65 minutes
- Country: United States
- Language: Silent (English intertitles)

A Girl's Folly (1917)

A Girl's Folly is a 1917 American silent comedy film directed by Maurice Tourneur and starring Robert Warwick, Doris Kenyon, June Elvidge, Jane Adair, Chester Barnett, and Johnny Hines. Tourneur also played the director for the film within the film.

== Plot ==
According to a film magazine, "Mary Baker, a simple country girl, meets and admires Driscoll, a movie actor. Thinking to make a brilliant success in the pictures, Mary leaves her sweet mother and her rustic lover behind and accompanies Driscoll to the city. Upon being given a trial, however, Mary proves a flat failure. Not daring to face the humiliation of going home (she has painted herself in her letters as successful) she accepts the offer of Driscoll, who, by the way, is married, and he plans to fit her up in an apartment.

On the night of the opening of the apartment, Driscoll invites some of his friends for a party. During the height of festivities, Mary's mother arrives. In the comparison of these sophisticated revelers with her pure mother, Mary sees the light, and realizes what she has been on the verge of. The little mother never learns the true meaning of the party, thanks to the consideration of Driscoll, who allows Mary to follow the dictates of her heart. The story comes to a happy finish with Driscoll finding renewed love for the wife whom he thought he had tired of, and Mary accepting her farmer lover."

== Cast ==
- Robert Warwick as Kenneth Driscoll
- Doris Kenyon as Mary Baker
- June Elvidge as Vivian Carleton
- Jane Adair as Mrs. Baker
- Chester Barnett as Johnny Applebloom
- Johnny Hines as Hank
- Emile Chautard as Actor (uncredited) (unconfirmed)
- Leatrice Joy as Ingenue (uncredited)
- Maurice Tourneur as Director (uncredited)
- Josef von Sternberg as Cameraman (uncredited)

== Production ==
A Girl's Folly was originally produced under the working title "A Movie Romance." Several scenes in the film show areas of the Paragon Films studio in Fort Lee, New Jersey, including the film lab, editing room, printing plant, spray chamber, cafeteria, dressing rooms, and film sets.

== Reception ==
Motography reviewer George W. Graves had much praise for Doris Kenyon, writing that she was "making rapid strides in screen-play art" and called her portrayal "very convincing." The film as a whole he described as "finely finished production."

Moving Picture World reviewer Edward Weitzel found the film's plot to be "rather slight" but described the cast as being "of unusual strength."

Variety's review described the story as clever and being "full to overflowing with comedy." While the review was positive towards the film, it also stated "The public should be greatly interested in seeing how moving pictures are made - it is all here - but whether it is good for the picture business or not to show these things is another question."

Wid's Films and Film Folk gave the film a mixed review, finding it enjoyable, but disliked how the film revealed the inner workings of the film industry to the public.

== Preservation ==
Prints of A Girl's Folly in various grades of completeness are held in several film archives including the Cineteca Del Friuli (Gemona), BFI National Archive, George Eastman Museum Motion Picture Collection, UCLA Film & Television Archive, and Library of Congress, with a complete copy donated from a private collection to the American Film Institute and Library of Congress in 1972. An incomplete print was also found in 1978 in the Dawson Film Find preserved by permafrost.
