= Émile Chautard =

French film director, actor, and screenwriter (1864–1934)

Emile Chautard
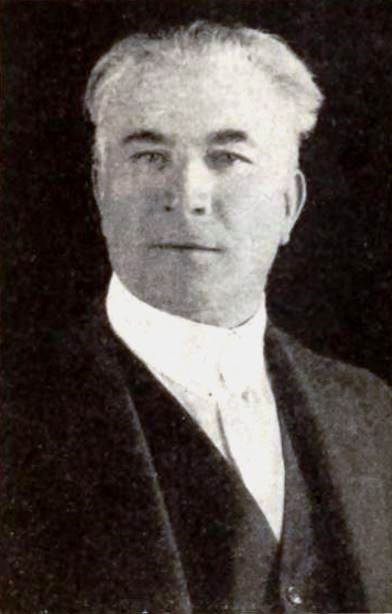
- Chautard in 1920
- Born: 7 September 1864; Paris, France
- Died: 24 April 1934 (aged 69); Westwood, Los Angeles, California, U.S.
- Resting place: Hollywood Forever Cemetery
- Occupation(s): Film director, actor, screenwriter
- Years active: 1910–1934

Émile Chautard (7 September 1864 – 24 April 1934) was a French-American film director, actor, and screenwriter, most active in the silent era. He directed more than 100 films between 1910 and 1924. He also appeared in more than 60 films between 1911 and 1934.

== Life and work ==
Chautard was born in Paris. After a significant career beginning as a stage actor at the Odéon-Théâtre de l'Europe and moving up to the head of film production at Éclair Films' Paris studio in 1913, Chautard emigrated to the United States in January 1915, sailing on the S/S Rochambeau, from Le Havre to New York. From 1915 to about 1918, Chautard worked for the World Film Company based in Fort Lee, New Jersey.

At World, along with a group of other French-speaking film technicians including Maurice Tourneur, Léonce Perret, George Archainbaud, Albert Capellani and Lucien Andriot, he developed such films as the 1915 version of Camille, and taught a young apprentice film cutter at the World studio: Josef von Sternberg. In 1919 Chautard hired von Sternberg as his assistant director for The Mystery of the Yellow Room, for his own short-lived production company.

Choosing Hollywood over a return to France, Chautard went to work for Famous Players–Lasky and other studios. He received some high-profile assignments, for instance a Colleen Moore vehicle and two features for Derelys Perdue, but he was a generation older than other directors in Hollywood's French colony. After 1924 Chautard did not direct again, but continued to make film appearances, in the von Sternberg film Blonde Venus (1932), where he appears for his former protege as "Night club owner Chautard".

Chautard died in Los Angeles, California. He is interred at the Hollywood Forever Cemetery.

== Selected filmography ==
La Dame de Monsoreau (1913)

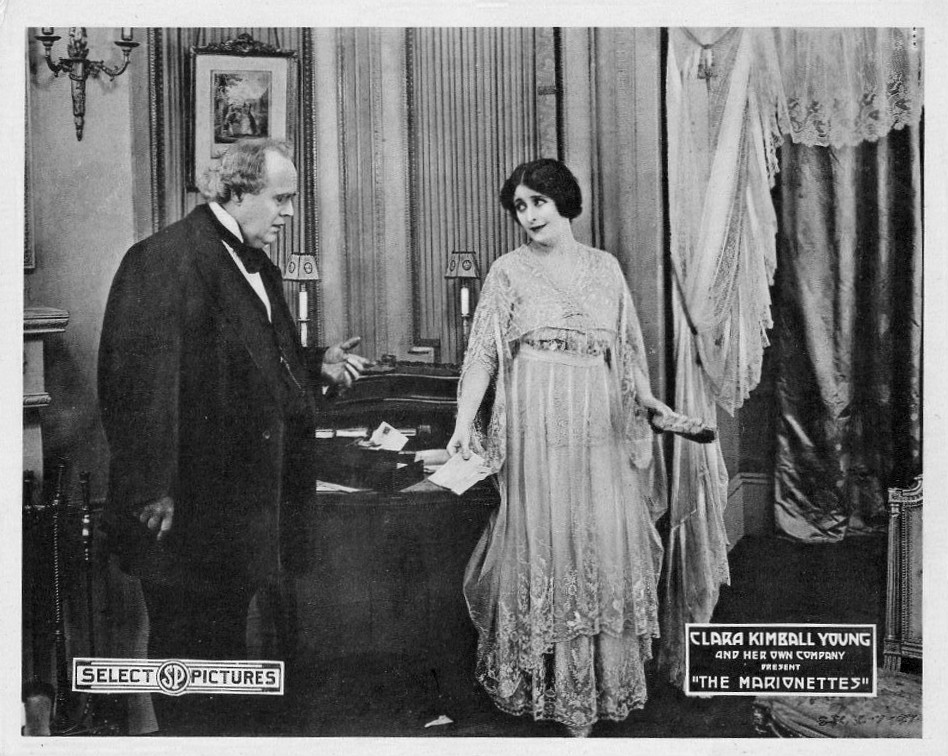
Edward Kimball and Clara Kimball Young in The Marionettes (1918)

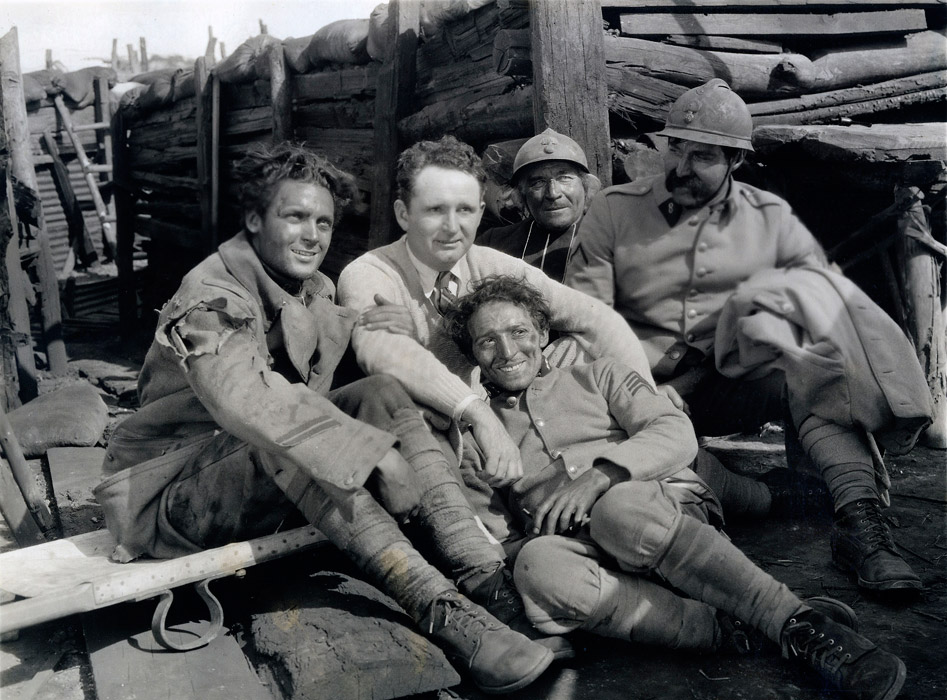
Director Frank Borzage, center, with cast members (from left) Charles Farrell, George E. Stone (reclining), Émile Chautard, and David Butler on the battlefield set of 7th Heaven (1927)

- The Mystery of the Yellow Room (1913, director)
- Protéa (1913) - Ministre de CEltie
- The Eaglet (1913) - Napoleon Bonaparte
- The Rack (1915, director)
- The Boss (1915, director)
- Human Driftwood (1916, director)
- The Family Honor (1917, director)
- The Fires of Youth (1917, director)
- Magda (1917, director, lost)
- A Girl's Folly (1917) - Actor (uncredited)
- The Eternal Temptress (1917, director)
- The Marionettes (1918, director)
- The House of Glass (1918, director)
- The Ordeal of Rosetta (1918, director)
- Under the Greenwood Tree (1918, director)
- The Marionettes (1918, director)
- Eyes of the Soul (1919, director)
- The Marriage Price (1919, director)
- The Mystery of the Yellow Room (1919, director, based on a Gaston Leroux story)
- The Black Panther's Cub (1921, director)
- Whispering Shadows (1921, director)
- Forsaking All Others (1922, director)
- Youth to Youth (1922, director)
- The Glory of Clementina (1922, director)
- Daytime Wives (1923, director)
- Untamed Youth (1924, director)
- Paris at Midnight (1926) - Père Goriot
- Broken Hearts of Hollywood (1926) - Director
- Bardelys the Magnificent (1926) - Anatol
- My Official Wife (1926) - Count Orloff, Hélène's Father
- Upstage (1926) - Performer (uncredited)
- The Flaming Forest (1926) - André Audemard
- Blonde or Brunette (1927) - Father-in-Law
- Upstream (1927) - Campbell-Mandare
- Whispering Sage (1927) - José Arastrade
- Seventh Heaven (1927) - Father Chevillon, the Priest
- Now We're in the Air (1927) - Monsieur Chelaine
- The Love Mart (1927) - Louis Frobelle
- The Noose (1928) - Priest
- His Tiger Lady (1928) - Stage Manager
- The Olympic Hero (1928) - Grandpa Brown
- Lilac Time (1928) - The Mayor
- Out of the Ruins (1928) - Père Gilbert
- Caught in the Fog (1928) - The Old Man
- Adoration (1928) - Murajev
- House of Horror (1929) - Old Miser
- Marianne (1929, silent and musical versions) - Père Joseph
- Times Square (1929) - David Lederwitski
- South Sea Rose (1929) - Rosalie's Uncle
- Tiger Rose (1929) - Frenchman (uncredited)
- Free and Easy (1930) - Minor Role (uncredited)
- Le spectre vert (1930) - Abdoul
- Sweeping Against the Winds (1930)
- Estrellados (1930)
- A Man from Wyoming (1930) - French Mayor
- Mysterious Mr. Parkes (1930) - Sylvester Corbett
- Just Like Heaven (1930) - Jacques Dulac
- Morocco (1930) - French General (uncredited)
- Counter Investigation (1930) - O'Brien
- Échec au roi (1930) - Le roi Eric VIII - The King
- The Little Cafe (1931) - Philibert
- The Big Trail (1931) - Padre
- Révolte dans la prison (1931) - Pop
- The Common Law (1931) - Doorman (uncredited)
- The Road to Reno (1931) - Andre
- The Yellow Ticket (1931) - Headwaiter (uncredited)
- Le procès de Mary Dugan (1931)
- Cock of the Air (1932) - French Ambassador
- Shanghai Express (1932) - Major Lenard
- Le fils de l'autre (1932) - John Whitcomb
- The Man from Yesterday (1932) - Priest
- Blonde Venus (1932) - Chautard, French Nightclub Manager (uncredited)
- Le bluffeur (1932) - Oscar Brown
- Rasputin and the Empress (1932) - Minor Role (uncredited)
- The California Trail (1933) - Don Marco Ramirez
- The Three Musketeers (1933, Serial) - Gen. Pelletier [Ch. 1]
- The Devil's in Love (1933) - Father Carmion
- The Solitaire Man (1933) - French Hotel Clerk (uncredited)
- Design for Living (1933) - Train Conductor (uncredited)
- Gallant Lady (1933) - French Hotel Clerk (uncredited)
- The Way to Love (1933) - M. Prias
- Man of Two Worlds (1934) - Natkusiak
- Wonder Bar (1934) - Pierre - the Concierge (uncredited)
- Come On Marines! (1934) - Priest
- Riptide (1934) - Doctor (uncredited)
- Viva Villa! (1934) - General Told to Leave Room (uncredited)
