= Flaming Fury (1926 film) =

1926 film

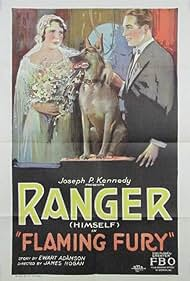
- Directed by: James P. Hogan; John E. Burch (assistant)
- Written by: Ewart Adamson
- Starring: Charles Delaney; Betty May (actress); Boris Karloff; Ranger the Wonder Dog
- Cinematography: Joseph Walker
- Production company: Robertson-Cole Pictures Corporation
- Distributed by: Film Booking Offices of America
- Release date: December 5, 1926
- Running time: 5 reels
- Country: United States
- Languages: Silent; English intertitles

Flaming Fury is a 1926 American silent drama film directed by James P. Hogan and featuring Ranger the Wonder Dog, and Boris Karloff as Gaspard. A print of the film exists in the Cinematheque Royale de Belgique.

== Cast ==
- Ranger the Wonder Dog
- Charles Delaney as Dan Duval
- Betty May as Jeanette Duval
- Boris Karloff as Gaspard
- Eddy Chandler as Bethune
