= Gladden James =

American actor (1888–1948)

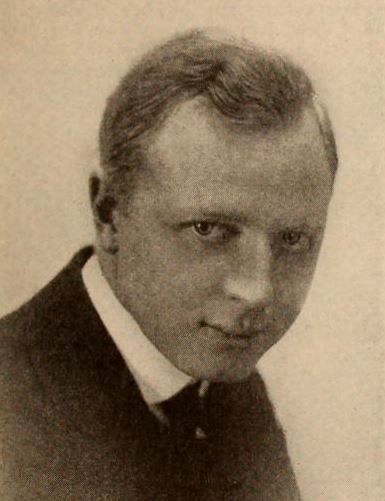
- James in 1919
- Born: February 26, 1888; Zanesville, Ohio, U.S.
- Died: August 28, 1948 (aged 60); Hollywood, California, U.S.
- Education: University of Nebraska
- Occupation: Actor
- Years active: 1911–1946
- Spouse: Julia Nagl (m. 1914; div. 1917)
- Children: 1

Gladden James (February 26, 1888 – August 28, 1948) was an American film actor. He appeared in more than 180 films between 1911 and 1946. He was born in Zanesville, Ohio and died in Hollywood, California, from leukemia.

== Family ==
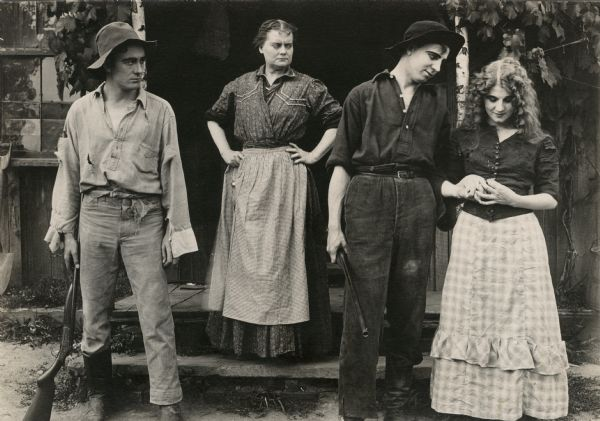
(L-R): Owen Moore, Victory Bateman, Gladden James and Florence Lawrence in After All (1912)

In 1914 he married Julia Nagl, a 1911 Phi Beta Kappa graduate of the University of Nebraska and later a Broadway actress who he appeared with in Officer 666, in Texas while on a picture taking assignment with the US government. They had one child, Jacqueline F. James, a medical doctor (October 19, 1914 – December 28, 1986), before divorcing in 1917.

== Partial filmography ==
- The Strange Story of Sylvia Gray (1914)
- The Man Who Couldn't Beat God (1915)
- Mortmain (1915)
- Paying the Price (1916)
- In Honor's Web (1919)
- Thou Shalt Not (1919)
- The Road of Ambition (1920)
- Bucking the Tiger (1921)
- The Broken Violin (1923)
- Marry in Haste (1924)
- Sweet Sixteen (1928)
- Paradise Island (1930)
- Gabriel Over the White House (1933) (uncredited)
- The Mayor of Hell (1933) (uncredited)
- Queen Christina (1933) (uncredited)
- The Captain Hates the Sea (1934) (uncredited)
- The Whole Town's Talking (1935) (uncredited)
- Charlie Chan in Shanghai (1935) (uncredited)
- Annie Oakley (1935) (uncredited)
- Magnificent Obsession (1935) (uncredited)
- Mr. Deeds Goes to Town (1936) (uncredited)
- Captain January (1936) (uncredited)
- Charlie Chan at the Opera (1936) (uncredited)
- Captains Courageous (1937) (uncredited)
- The Toast of New York (1937) (uncredited)
- Mr. Moto's Gamble (1938) (uncredited)
- Test Pilot (1938) (uncredited)
- Boys Town (1938) (uncredited)
- Rose of Washington Square (1939) (uncredited)
- Another Thin Man (1939) (uncredited)
- Swanee River (1939) (uncredited)
- The Earl of Chicago (1940) (uncredited)
- Johnny Apollo (1940) (uncredited)
- Maryland (1940) (uncredited)
- I Wanted Wings (1941) (uncredited)
- The People vs. Dr. Kildare (1941) (uncredited)
- Design for Scandal (1941) (uncredited)
- For Me and My Gal (1942) (uncredited)
- Tennessee Johnson (1942) (uncredited)
- The Meanest Man in the World (1943) (uncredited)
- Wilson (1944) (uncredited)
- Casanova Brown (1944) (uncredited)
- Week-End at the Waldorf (1945) (uncredited)
- Adventure (1945) (uncredited)
- The Hoodlum Saint (1946) (uncredited)
- The Strange Love of Martha Ivers (1946) (uncredited)
- Night and Day (1946) (uncredited)
