= William A. Brady =

American actor

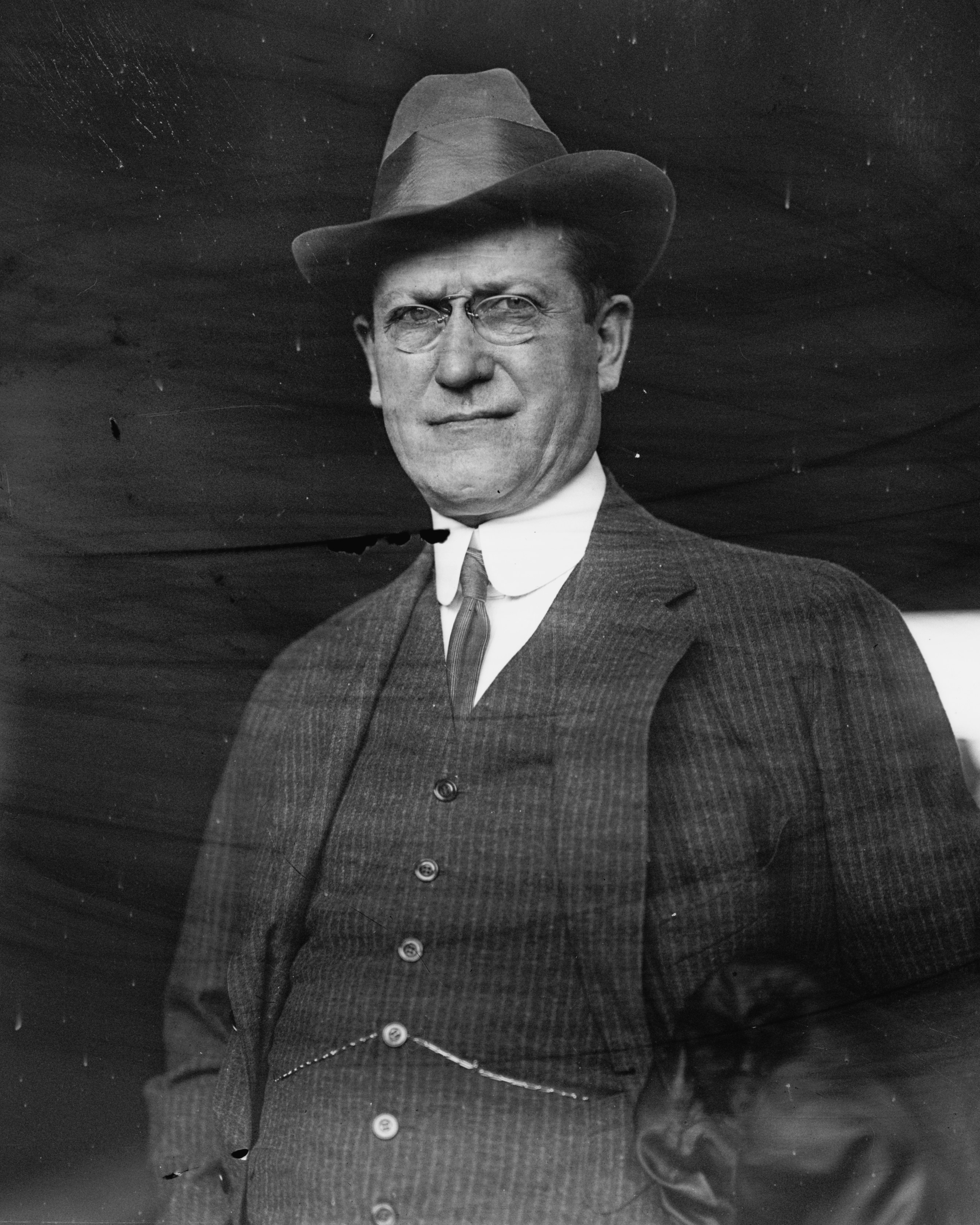
- Brady circa 1910/1913.
- Born: June 19, 1863; San Francisco, U.S.
- Died: January 6, 1950 (aged 86); New York City, U.S.
- Resting place: Sleepy Hollow Cemetery
- Spouses: Rose Marie René (died 1896) (?–1896) (her death); Grace George (1899–1950) (his death)
- Children: 2, including Alice Brady

William Aloysius Brady (June 19, 1863 – January 6, 1950) was an American theater actor, producer, and sports promoter.

== Biography ==
Brady was born in 1863 to an Irish-born newspaperman, Terence Brady, who kidnapped him from San Francisco and brought him to New York City, where his father worked as a writer while William was forced to sell newspapers on street corners. Upon his father's death when William was 15, he hitchhiked his way back to San Francisco. He made his start onstage in San Francisco with a company headed by Joseph R. Grismer and Phoebe Davies shortly after his return.

After a failed attempt to produce a version of She by H. Rider Haggard, he was able to secure the rights to After Dark, successfully bringing the play to New York. Although sued for his efforts, as Augustin Daly claimed plagiarism, Brady was still able to make enough money to continue with his theater ventures. He inadvertently became a boxing promoter during this time. He cast James J. Jeffries in After Dark, and later introduced the man into the boxing circuit, where Jeffries would eventually become the undisputed heavyweight champion. Brady would be the only person to manage two undisputed heavyweight champions, in Jeffries and James J. Corbett.

Brady produced The Corbett-Fitzsimmons Fight in 1897. Although Corbett ultimately lost, the match ran for over an hour and a half, and the documentary lasted that long, the longest film ever released at the time. In 1898, Brady and Grismer produced the hugely successful Charlotte Blair Parker play, Way Down East. The two remained partners until Grismer's retirement sometime around 1909.

=== Other clients ===
In late 1896 Brady watched as young bicycle racer Major Taylor won his first professional races, a half-mile exhibition and a six-day race at Madison Square Garden. Brady arranged to promote Taylor, who was a Black athlete facing serious obstacles in a racist time. Brady was known for using his tenacity and innovation to secure races for Taylor. For example, when southern cycling officials sought to ban Taylor from national competition, Brady built his own racetrack and started his own cycle race series for Taylor.

Another Brady client was Black polar explorer Matthew Henson. Henson, denied the credit given to white Commander Peary, was financially destitute and physically unable to work, when Brady arranged a national lecture tour for him. In a 1930 interview, a grateful Henson credited Brady for "taking care of" objections by Commander Peary; he said that Brady accepted no promoter's fee for the tour beyond "twenty-five dollars for cigar money."

Brady picked up the contract of Koca Yusuf and toured him around the east and midwest.

=== Theater ===
Brady ran a successful theatre operation for thirty years, having met actresses like Grace George (whom he later married) and having, at one point, hired famous humorist Robert Benchley to complete ad copy for him. Brady's success continued until the Stock Market Crash of 1929, which wiped out his entire savings. He was able to secure the funds to produce Street Scene, which was written by Elmer Rice, won the Pulitzer Prize, and netted Brady roughly a half a million dollars. His total theatrical output included over 260 plays, including a version of Uncle Tom's Cabin that was later used as images for a book in 1904, and a number of movies before his death.

- Slaves All by Edward Percy

== Personal life ==
His first wife was Rose Marie René (died 1896). Their daughter was actress Mary Rose Brady, who used stage name of Alice Brady, and later became an Academy Award winner for In Old Chicago (1937). She predeceased her father and step-mother. Brady's second wife was Broadway actress Grace George. They were married from 1899 until his death in 1950. They had a son, William A. Brady, Jr. (1900–1935) who married actress Katherine Alexander. William Brady Jr. also predeceased his parents.

== Death ==
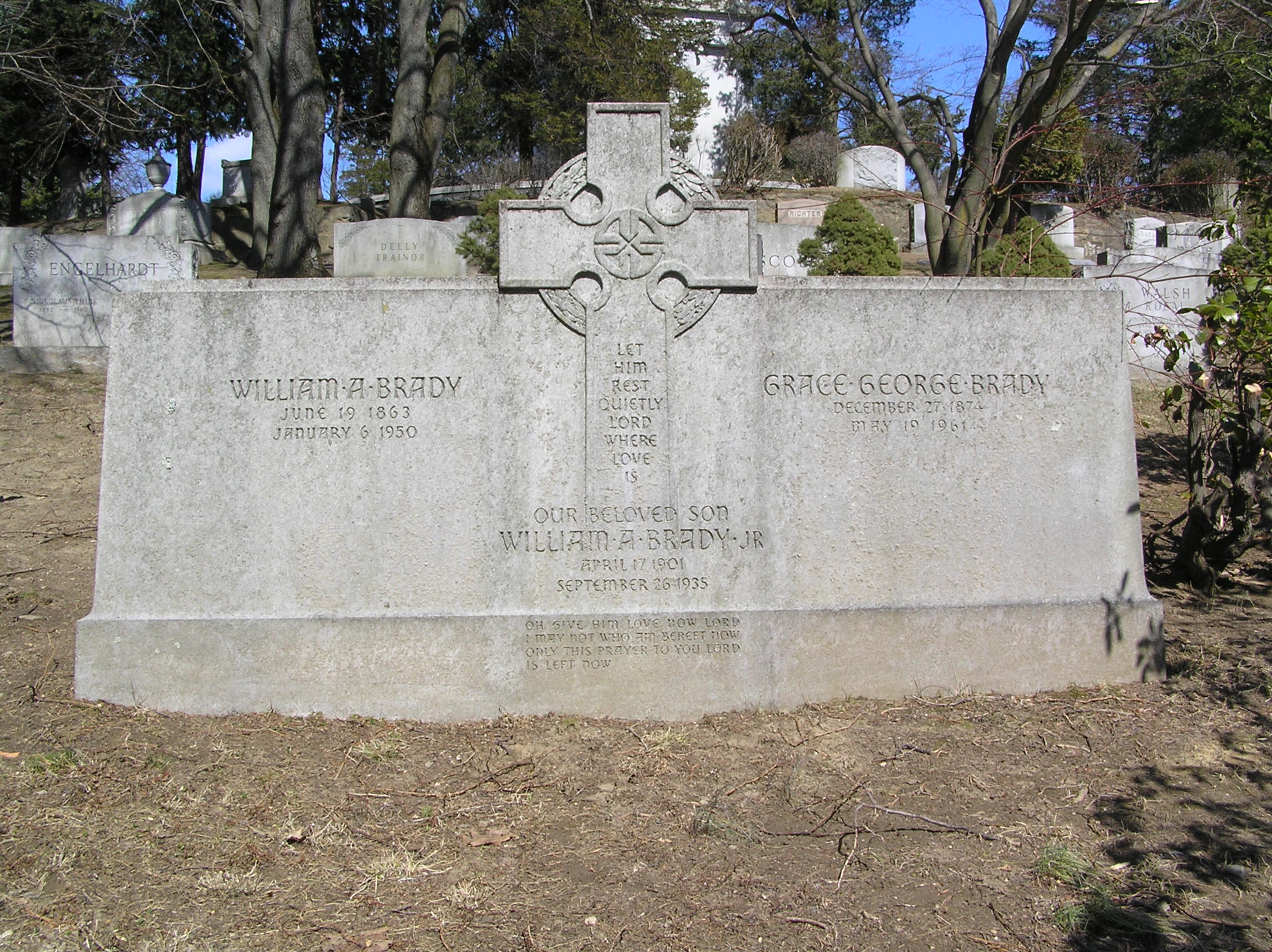
Brady gravesite in Sleepy Hollow

William A. Brady died at age 86 of a heart ailment. He was predeceased by his children and grandson, Donald Crane (March 10, 1922–January 17, 1942). He was survived by his second wife, Grace George; his son-in-law (Alice Brady's husband), actor James Crane; his daughter-in-law, actress Katharine Alexander (wife of William A. Brady, Jr.); and his grand-daughter, Barbara Alexander Brady (1931-1978).

William A. Brady is interred at Sleepy Hollow Cemetery in Sleepy Hollow, New York.

== Legacy ==
Brady was inducted into the International Boxing Hall of Fame in 1998.

== Selected filmography ==
- The Rack (1915)
- Alias Jimmy Valentine (1915)
- What Happened to Jones (1915)
- The Ballet Girl (1916)
- Paying the Price (1916)
- A Woman's Way (1916)
- Bought and Paid For (1916)
- The Scarlet Oath (1916)
- The Men She Married (1916)
- The Beloved Adventuress (1917)
- The Crimson Dove (1917)
- A Woman Alone (1917)
- The Red Woman (1917)
- A Square Deal (1917)
- The Marriage Market (1917)
- The Social Leper (1917)
- Souls Adrift (1917)
- Darkest Russia (1917)
- The Woman Beneath (1917)
- Moral Courage (1917)
- The Tenth Case (1917)
- The False Friend (1917)
- The Little Duchess (1917)
- Maternity (1917)
- The Burglar (1917)
- The Divorce Game (1917)
- The Strong Way (1917)
- The Family Honor (1917)
- Easy Money (1917)
- The Stolen Paradise (1917)
- The Iron Ring (1917)
- The Volunteer (1917)
- Adventures of Carol (1917)
- The Bondage of Fear (1917)
- Youth (1917)
- Man's Woman (1917)
- The Dancer's Peril (1917)
- The Good for Nothing (1917)
- Diamonds and Pearls (1917)
- The Dormant Power (1917)
- Yankee Pluck (1917)
- The Page Mystery (1917)
- As Man Made Her (1917)
- The Brand of Satan (1917)
- The Awakening (1917)
- A Maid of Belgium (1917)
- Shall We Forgive Her? (1917)
- The Heart of a Girl (1918)
- The Golden Wall (1918)
