= World Film Company =

American production and distribution firm (1914–1921)

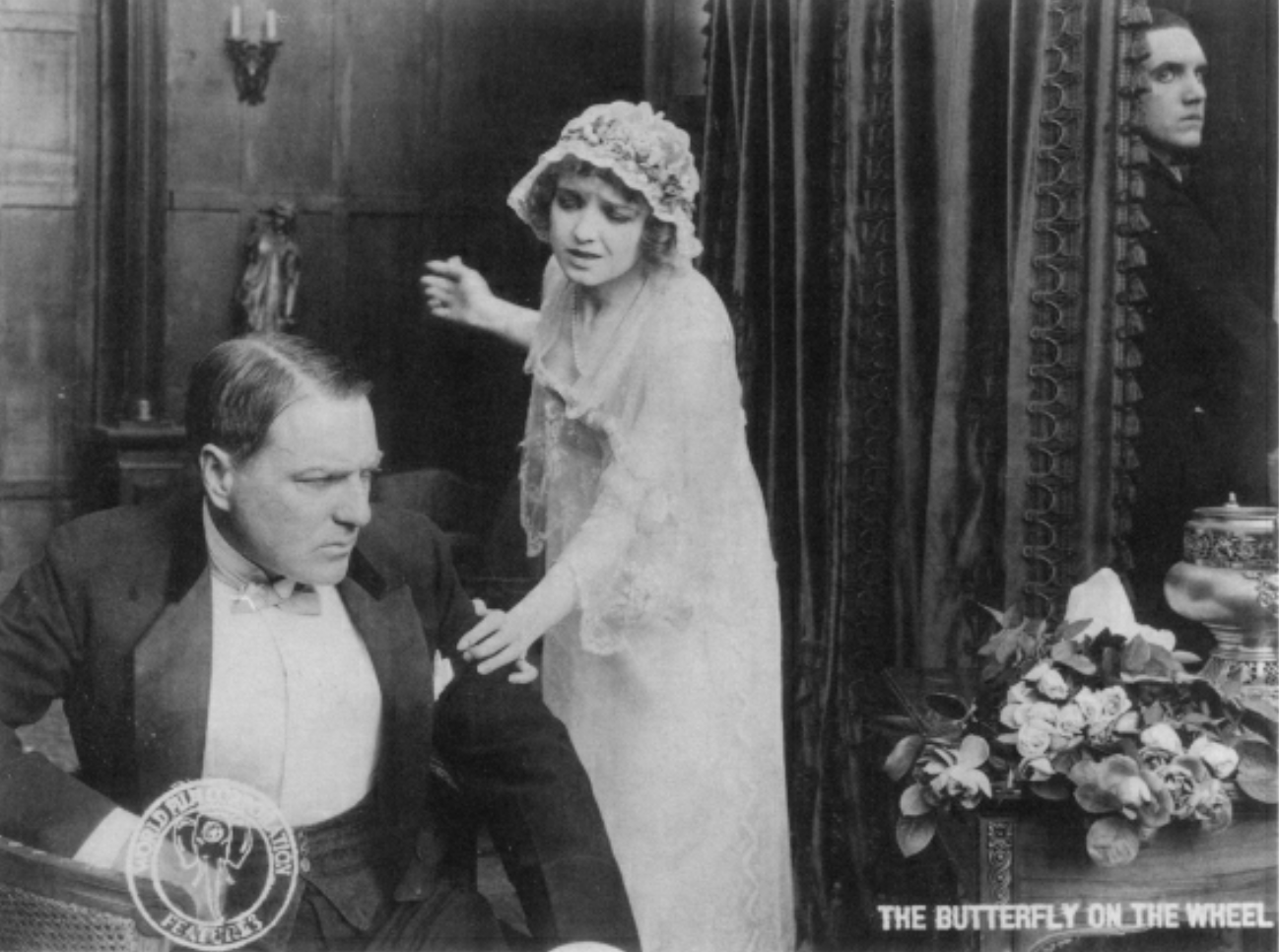
Scene from World Film's A Butterfly on the Wheel, starring Holbrook Blinn and Vivian Martin, 1915

The World Film Company or World Film Corporation was an American film production and distribution company, organized in 1914 in Fort Lee, New Jersey.

Short-lived but significant in American film history, World Film was created by financier and filmmaker Lewis J. Selznick in Fort Lee, where many early film studios in America's first motion picture industry were based in the early part of the 20th century.

== Formation ==
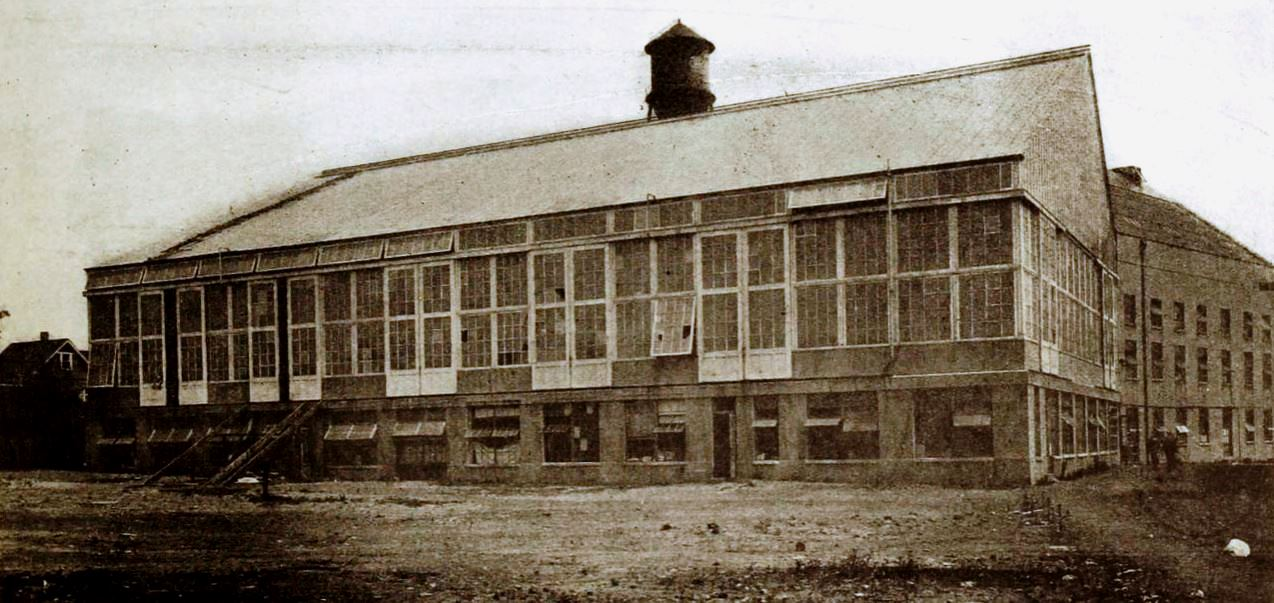
Selznick Studio, Fort Lee, 1920

World Film was to be the distribution arm for three main production companies: Selznick's own production company called Equitable Pictures, Jules Brulatour's Peerless Pictures, and the Shubert Pictures production company founded by the strong-willed promoter and entrepreneur William Aloysius Brady.

Under this arrangement, World Film was the distributor for some 380 short films and features from 1914 through 1921. It also became a production company, with filming centered at Brulatour's Peerless Studio facilities, and run by Brady. The Shuberts intended to use their own chain of vaudeville and legitimate theaters as film venues. In the period between 1912 and 1915, all five of the most important film production companies in the U.S. had similar ties to theatrical entrepreneurs, hoping to leverage their theater chains: Famous Players Film Company, Klaw & Erlanger's "Protective Amusement Company", the Jesse L. Lasky Company, the Triangle Film Corporation, and World Film.

By 1916, Selznick was ousted from World Film by its board. Chicago investor Arthur Spiegel was put in charge as president. Production remained at Fort Lee until 1919, when the company was re-purchased by Selznick and absorbed into his Lewis J. Selznick Productions, based on the west coast of the United States.

== Talent ==
World Film was distinguished by its concentration of talent. It acquired film production company Equitable Motion Pictures Corporation.

The destruction by fire of the French-based Eclair's New Jersey studio on March 10, 1914, and the outbreak of World War I the following August drove a re-organization of foreign film-industry assets in Fort Lee, including the employees. Within World Film a number of French directors and cinematographers, many of whom had been brought over to work at American Eclair, organized themselves in a separate French-speaking unit, with its own sensibility. For about three years Maurice Tourneur, Léonce Perret, George Archainbaud, Emile Chautard, Albert Capellani and Lucien Andriot, among others, worked together on films such as 1914's The Wishing Ring: An Idyll of Old England, the 1915 versions of Camille and Alias Jimmy Valentine, the 1916 La Bohème. and taught a young apprentice film cutter at the World studio: Josef von Sternberg.

Others were also hired into World Film: actress Clara Kimball Young (the second wife of director James Young, married and divorced) hired away from Vitagraph, Sidney Olcott hired away from Kalem Studios, screenwriter Frances Marion, actress Elaine Hammerstein, and vaudeville star Lew Fields, and Clara Whipple (third wife of director James Young, married and divorced).

== Partial filmography ==
- The Brass Bottle (1914)
- The Wishing Ring (1914)
- The Lure (1914)
- In the Land of the Head Hunters (1914)
- Uncle Tom's Cabin (1914)
- The Boss (1915)
- Camille (1915)
- The Cub (1915)
- Wildfire (1915)
- Evidence (1915)
- A Butterfly on the Wheel (1915)
- The Fisher Girl (1915); aka The Daughter of the Sea
- Blue Grass (1915)
- Hearts in Exile (1915)
- McTeague (1916)
- The Rise of Susan (1916)
- The Bludgeon (it) (1915)
- The Question (1916)
- His One Big Chance (1916)
- The City (1916)
- The Man Who Dared God (1917)
- The Man Who Forgot (1917)
- The Reapers (1916)
- Sudden Riches (1916)
- The Price of Happiness (1916)
- The Revolt (1916)
- The Gilded Cage (1916)
- The Heart of a Hero (1916)
- Birth of Character

Working titles:

The Making of a Man
The Transmutation
Life's Crucible

- A Girl's Folly (1917)
- Betsy Ross (1917)
- The Ghost of Slumber Mountain (1918)
- Little Orphant Annie (1918)
- The Devil's Trail (1919)
- When Bearcat Went Dry (1919)
