= Belza (surname) =

Belza is a surname. Notable people with the surname include:

- Dom Belza, American politician
- Eduardo Belza (born 1956), Uruguayan footballer
- Jesús Belza (born 2004), Spanish footballer

== See also ==
- Bełza, another surname
- Robert Belza (1926–1977), Czech weightlifter
- Belža, locality in Slovakia
- Villa Belza, historic house in Biarritz, France built by Ange Du Fresnay
