= Bełza =

Bełza is a Polish surname. Notable people with the surname include:

- Witold Bełza (1886–1955), Polish librarian, writer, publicist, and cultural activist
- Władysław Bełza (1847–1913), Polish poet

== See also ==
- Belza (surname), another surname
- Robert Belza (1926–1977), Czech weightlifter
- Belža, locality in Slovakia
- Villa Belza, historic house in Biarritz, France built by Ange Du Fresnay
