= L'Assommoir (film) =

- Directed by: Albert Capellani
- Written by: Albert Capellani
- Based on: L'Assommoir by: William Busnach et Octave Gastineau (play); Emile Zola (novel)
- Starring: Alexandre Arquillière; Jacques Grétillat; Jacques Varennes; Eugénie Nau [fr] Catherine Fonteney
- Production company: Société Cinématographique des Auteurs et Gens de Lettres [fr]
- Distributed by: Pathé
- Release dates: 21 December 1908 (Gala evening at the Cirque d'Hiver); 19 March 1909 (France)
- Running time: 36 min (740 m.; 2427.2 ft.)
- Country: France
- Language: French

L'Assommoir (English: The Drinking Den) is a 1909 French drama film directed by Albert Capellani, adapting the eponymous 1879 play by William Busnach et Octave Gastineau, itself based on the 1877 novel by Emile Zola. It is the first French feature-length film and the second produced by the Société cinématographique des auteurs et gens de lettres (SCAGL) [fr] (English: Cinematographic Society of Authors and Writers).

== Plot ==

=== Part one ===
In the street in front of Hotel Bon Coeur (English: Good Heart Hotel), Lantier is flirting with Virginie. Gervaise arrives and follows Lantier inside. In their room, Lantier and Gervaise start a fight but they stop when their friend Coupeau enters the place. Lantier asks her for money. After giving him her purse, Gervaise takes her bundle of clothes and leaves for her work. Lantier packs his things, puts his trunk on a cab and leaves after having given a note to a young boy. Gervaise arrives at the public wash house, where she begins her toil. Virginie, one of Gervaise co-workers, taunts her about the loss of her lover. Soon the boy arrives at the laundry and gives Gervaise Lantier's note that reads: "I have had enough of your jealous outbursts, and have decided to leave you. Don't worry about me: I have found consolation. Lantier." Virginie looks at her with a triumphant sneer and under her breath makes slurring remarks. Gervaise turns on her, giving her a terrible beating. In front of the wash house, Gervaise sees Virginie enter a cab with Lantier and drive away.

A few months later, Coupeau meets Gervaise in the park and proposes marriage to her. Gervaise happily accepts and on their way home they stop at a café to inform their friends of the coming event. A drunk man starts a brawl and is arrested by a policeman. Gervaise makes Coupeau swear that he will stop drinking. The couple invite their friends to a party for their wedding in a guinguette. They dance to the sound of a barrel organ.

Four years later, Virginie takes her revenge. She has never forgotten the humiliation she endured that eventful day in the laundry, when Gervaise attacked her. One day, Gervaise and her little daughter Nana carry Coupeau his lunch to the building site where he is working. While he is having lunch with them, Virginie climbs upon the scaffolding and loosens some of the boards. As Coupeau climbs the ladder to return to work he stops for a moment to wave goodbye to his dear ones, when suddenly the planks give way under his feet and he is precipitated to the ground below. The other workmen who hurry to the scene raise the injured man and carry him to his home.

=== Part two ===

Coupeau, now cured meets his friends, including Goujet and Virginie at a café, all carrying flowers. They drink a glass of champagne and leave together. Coupeau and his friends arrive at Gervaise's laundry shop where she has invited them for her birthday. Coupeau drinks heavily and falls asleep on the table. Lantier, who had watched the scene from outside, comes in and tries to kiss Gervaise. Goujet throws him out. Coupeau goes to a café and his friends convince him to start drinking again absinthe. Lantier bets that he can drink eight shots of spirit while the clock strikes eight. Coupeau loses because he is only able to finish six before he is helplessly intoxicated. Gervaise enters the place and, seeing the condition of her husband, begs him to go home with her, but he refuses to move. Desperate, she starts drinking with him. Goujet tries to take her away but Coupeau starts a fight with him. Finally Coupeau is attacked with delirium tremens and after a difficult struggle with his companions, is carried a raving maniac to the hospital.

=== Part three ===

Two years later, Coupeau is authorised to leave the hospital. He is sternly warned by a doctor against the use of strong liquors. The smallest glass, he is told, will cause immediate death. He may, however, partake of a very little red wine. He is accompanied home by a friend, who stops on the way to purchase a bottle of wine. Gervaise is very happy that Coupeau is back at home. After an effusive greeting, she takes her basket and hastens off to purchase some food for him. While Gervaise is away, Virginie slips into the room and substitutes a bottle of spirit for the wine. Soon Coupeau feels the need of a drink and goes to pick up the bottle. He raises it to his mouth and is flabbergasted when he realises it is not wine. Burning with the desire for liquor, he drains the bottle of its contents and is immediately seized with delirium tremens. After much suffering, he falls prostrate upon the floor, where his lifeless form is found by his unhappy wife upon her return. She sees Virgine looking triumphantly at the dead body and starts a fight with her. Goujet comes in, separates the two women and throws out Virginie. Other friends come in as he tries to comfort Gervaise.

== Production ==
After the success of the first film directed by Capellani for the SCAGL, L'Arlésienne, Charles Pathé entrusted him with the direction of a second literary adaptation, for which he was allowed a then unprecedented duration of more than half an hour, making it the longest French film at the time. Although the opening credits only refer to Emile Zola's novel, the film is actually an adaptation of the eponymous play by William Busnach et Octave Gastineau. The play reduces the plot to its simplest expression, a drama of jealousy, highlighting a secondary character in the novel, Virginia, who, becoming here one of the main protagonists, brings about a change in the meaning of the original work. Zola did not reject the theatrical adaptation but noted: "The modifications made to the novel, the attenuation of the falls of Gervaise and the figures of Lantier and Virginie made darker, have introduced in the drama lower elements." He explained this changes by the fact that the play was destined to be performed at L'Ambigu, a popular Boulevard theatre and not at L'Odéon where more highbrow plays were performed. Zola's remarks are applicable to the film which follows very closely the play.

The film was shot at the end of 1908 in the streets of Paris and in the new studios built by Pathé next to its plant in Vincennes for its prestige productions.

== Release and reception ==
The film premièred during a Gala evening at the Cirque d'Hiver in Paris, together with The Assassination of the Duke of Guise on 21 December 1908. Its general release took place on 19 March 1909 at the Pathé Grolée cinema in Lyon. According to spectators at the time of the release, a narrator (similar to the Japanese benshi) commented and explained the story.

In an article of 1910 about Art films, George Fagot notes that "despite the enormous length (735m.) of L'Assommoir, a considerable number of copies, equal to the greatest hits, were printed".

According to Christine Leteux, "L'Assommoir has aged extremely well. It combines cleverly staged studio sequences with location shots set in the streets of Paris and a guinguette."

== Selected Cast ==
- Alexandre Arquillière as Coupeau
- Jacques Grétillat as Lantier
- Eugénie Nau [fr] as Gervaise
- Catherine Fonteney as Virginie
- Jacques Varennes
- Paul Capellani
