= Capellani =

Capellani is a surname. Notable people with the surname include:

- Albert Capellani (1874–1931), French film director and screenwriter
- Paul Capellani (1877–1960), French actor
- Roger Capellani (1905–1940), French film director, son of Albert and nephew of Paul
