= Maurice Kéroul =

French film director

- Born: 30 November 1885; Paris, France
- Died: 19 May 1976 (aged 90); Boulogne-Billancourt, France
- Occupations: Director, screenwriter
- Years active: 1908–1947 (film)

Maurice Kéroul (1885–1976) was a French journalist, screenwriter and film director. He frequently collaborated with Georges Monca. He was the son of the playwright Henri Kéroul.

== Selected filmography ==
- The Irony of Fate (1924)
- No Relations (1925)
- Autour d'un berceau (1925)
- Miss Helyett (1928)
- Sowing the Wind (1929)
- Wedding Night (1935)
- Three Days Leave (1936)
- Le choc en retour (1937)
- La Dame de Haut-le-Bois (1947)

== Bibliography ==
- Powrie, Phil & Rebillard, Éric. Pierre Batcheff and stardom in 1920s French cinema. Edinburgh University Press, 2009.
- Rège, Philippe. Encyclopedia of French Film Directors, Volume 1. Scarecrow Press, 2009.
