= The Foolish Virgin (1916 film) =

1916 film by Albert Capellani

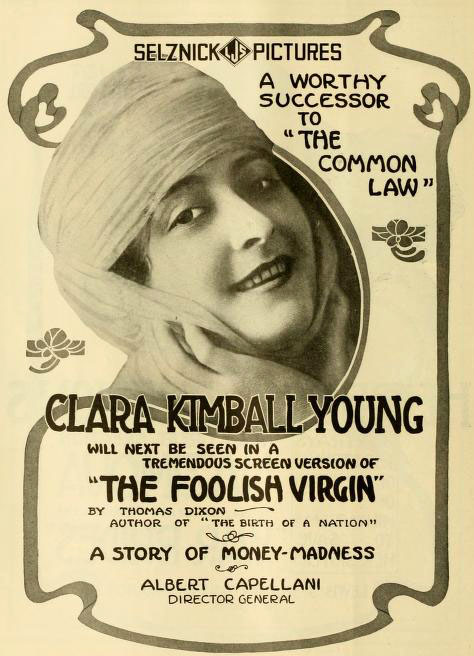
- Advertisement
- Directed by: Albert Capellani
- Written by: Albert Capellani
- Based on: The Foolish Virgin by Thomas Dixon Jr.
- Produced by: Clara Kimball Young; Lewis J. Selznick
- Starring: Clara Kimball Young; Conway Tearle; Paul Capellani
- Cinematography: Jacques Montéran; George Peters; Hal Young
- Production company: Clara Kimball Young Film Corporation
- Distributed by: Selznick Pictures
- Release date: September 26, 1916
- Running time: 7 reels
- Country: United States
- Language: Silent (English intertitles)

The Foolish Virgin is a 1916, American silent drama film directed by Albert Capellani and starring Clara Kimball Young, Conway Tearle, and Paul Capellani. It was shot at Fort Lee in New Jersey. Future star Rudolph Valentino appeared as an uncredited extra. It was adapted from Thomas Dixon's book and was marketed as "a worthy successor" to the film The Common Law.

== Cast ==
- Clara Kimball Young as Mary Adams
- Conway Tearle as Jim Anthony
- Paul Capellani as Dr. Mulford
- Catherine Proctor as Nance Anthony
- James Sheridan as Jim
- William Welsh as Jim's father
- Marie Lines as Jane
- Agnes Mapes as Ella Swanson
- Edward Elkas as Harden
- Jacqueline Morhange as Dora
- Virginia Rappe as Salesgirl (uncredited)

== Bibliography ==
- Donald W. McCaffrey & Christopher P. Jacobs. Guide to the Silent Years of American Cinema. Greenwood Publishing, 1999. ISBN 0-313-30345-2
