= Shadows of Paris =

Shadows of Paris may refer to:

- Shadows of Paris (1924 film), an American silent drama film
- Shadows of Paris (1932 film), a French film
