= Quatre-vingt-treize (film) =

1920 film

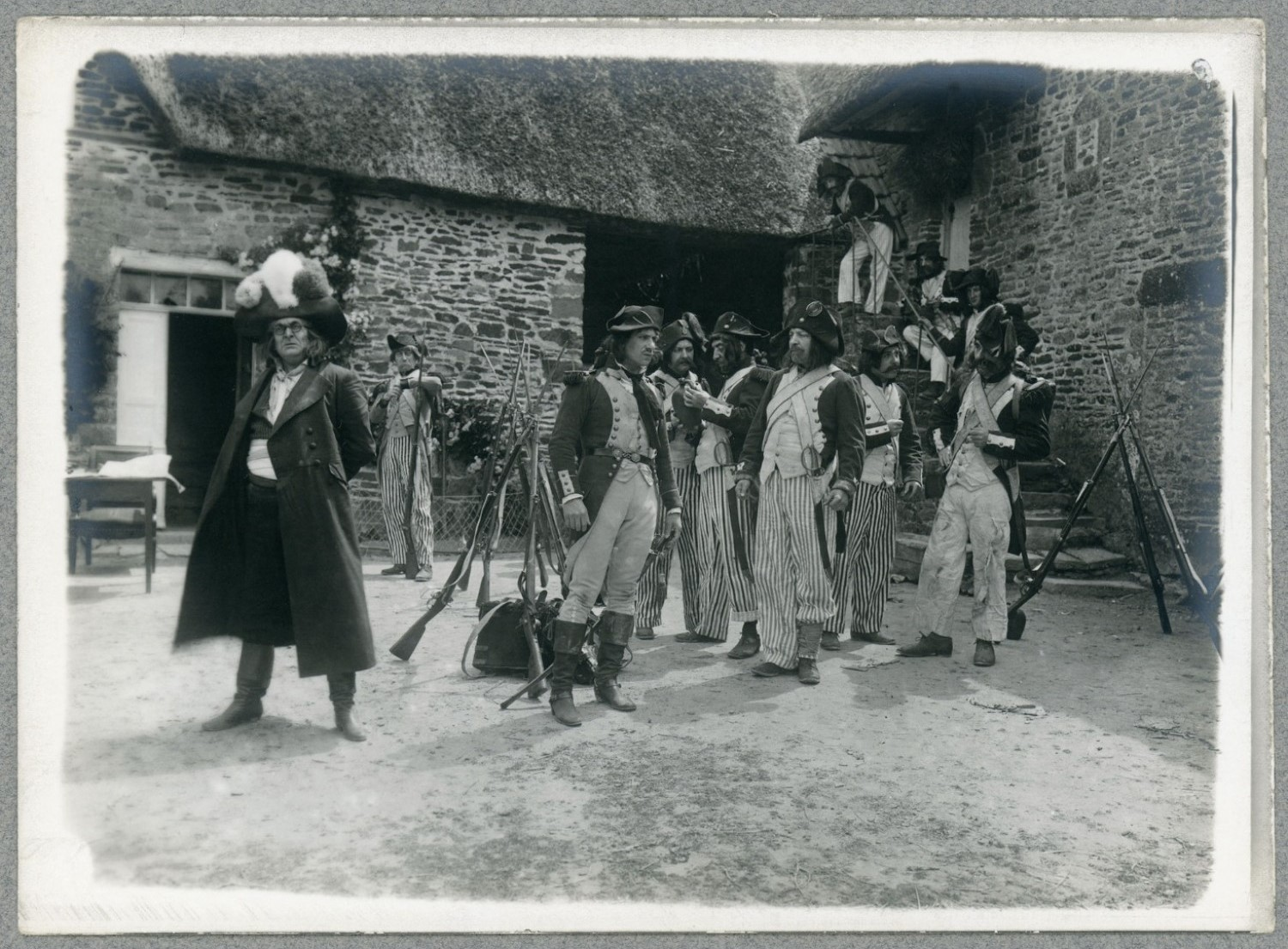
- Photogram, with Henri Krauss, left, and Paul Capellani, center.
- Directed by: André Antoine, Albert Capellani, Léonard Antoine
- Based on: Ninety-Three by Victor Hugo
- Starring: Charlotte Barbier-Krauss, Paul Capellani, Max Charlier, Georges Dorival, Philippe Garnier, Henry Krauss, Maurice Schutz
- Release date: 1920
- Country: France
- Language: Silent

Quatre-vingt-treize is a French silent film adapted by Alexandre Arnoux based on the novel Ninety-Three by Victor Hugo. Originally undertaken as a follow-up to his great success with Les misérables (1913), director Albert Capellani began the project in the spring and summer of 1914, but the war interrupted shooting and Capellani left France for the United States, not to return until 1923. In 1916 André Antoine with Assistant Director Julien Duvivier shot additional footage, and then production was banned for the duration of World War I. In 1921 Antoine edited the film, and it was shown that year in two parts.

In 1985 Philippe Esnault, under the auspices of the Cinémathèque française, restored the film from scattered parts to a 170 minute run time.

== Cast ==
- Charlotte Barbier-Krauss as Michelle Flécharde
- Paul Capellani as Gauvain
- Max Charlier as Imanus
- Georges Dorival as Radoub
- Philippe Garnier as Marquess de Lantenac
- Henry Krauss as Cimourdain
- Maurice Schutz as Grandcoeur
