= Adèle Daminois =

French novelist and playwright (1789–1876)

- Born: Angélique Adèle Huvey; 21 December 1789; Clermont, France
- Died: 5 March 1876 (aged 86); Paris, France
- Occupations: Novelist, playwright

Adèle Daminois, real name Angélique Adèle Huvey, (21 December 1789 – 5 March 1876) was a French woman novelist and playwright. She was Maria Du Fresnay's mother as well as Marie-Caroline Du Fresnay's and Ange Du Fresnay's grandmother.

She is known for her many articles in favor of the emancipation of women and their admission to jobs and honors as well as for her lectures at the Athénée des Arts. She authored novels of manners.

== Works ==
- 1819: Léontine de Werteling, 2 vols.
- 1819: Maria
- 1821: Alfred et Zaïda, 3 vols.
- 1823: Mareska et Oscar, 4 vols.
- 1823: La Chasse au renard, vaudeville in 1 act, with Amable de Saint-Hilaire
- 1824: Lydie, ou la Créole, 3 vols.
- 1825: Charles, ou le Fils naturel, 4 vols.
- 1826: Alaïs, ou la Vierge de Ténédos, short story
- 1827: Mes souvenirs, ou Choix d'anecdotes
- 1832: Une mosaïque, 2 vols.
- 1834: Le Prisonnier de Gisors
- 1836: Le Cloître au XIXème siècle
- 1838: Une âme d'enfer

== Bibliography ==
- Gustave Vapereau, Dictionnaire universel des contemporains, 1870, (p. 474) (Read online)
- Camille Dreyfus, André Berthelot, La Grande encyclopédie, vol.13, 1886, (p. 812)
- Cecilia Beach, French Women Playwrights Before the Twentieth Century, 1994, (p. 100)
- Martine Reid, Des femmes en littérature, 2010, (p. 328)
