= L'Assommoir =

1877 Novel by Émile Zola

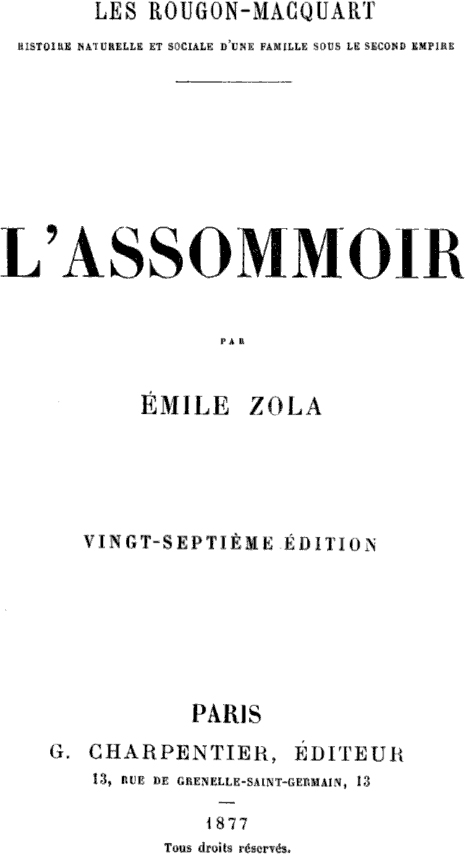
- Cover of 1877 Charpentier edition of L'Assommoir
- Author: Émile Zola
- Translator: Margaret Mauldon
- Language: French
- Series: Les Rougon-Macquart
- Genre: Novel
- Publication date: 1876 (serial); 1877 (book)
- Publication place: France
- English publication date: 1995
- Media type: Print (serial, hardback & paperback)
- Pages: 480 (paperback)
- Preceded by: The Bright Side of Life
- Followed by: The Masterpiece

L'Assommoir [lasɔmwaʁ], published as a serial in 1876, and in book form in 1877, is the seventh novel in Émile Zola's twenty-volume series Les Rougon-Macquart. Usually considered one of Zola's masterpieces, the novel—a study of alcoholism and poverty in the working-class districts of Paris—was a huge commercial success and helped establish Zola's fame and reputation throughout France and the world.

== Plot summary ==
The novel is principally the story of Gervaise Macquart, who is featured briefly in the first novel in the series, La Fortune des Rougon, running away to Paris with her shiftless lover Lantier to work as a washerwoman in a hot, busy laundry in one of the seedier areas of the city.

L'Assommoir begins with Gervaise and her two young sons being abandoned by Lantier, who takes off for parts unknown with another woman. Though at first she swears off men altogether, eventually she gives in to the advances of Coupeau, a teetotal roofer, and they are married. The marriage sequence is one of the most famous set-pieces of Zola's work; the account of the wedding party's impromptu and chaotic trip to the Louvre is one of the novelist's most famous passages. Through a combination of happy circumstances, Gervaise is able to realise her dream and raise enough money to open her own laundry. The couple's happiness appears to be complete with the birth of a daughter, Anna, nicknamed Nana (the protagonist of Zola's later novel of the same title).

However, later in the story, Gervaise's life goes down a downward trajectory from this happy high point. Coupeau is injured in a fall from the roof of a new hospital he is working on, and during his lengthy convalescence he takes first to idleness, then to gluttony, and eventually to drink. In only a few years, Coupeau becomes a vindictive, wife-beating alcoholic, with no intention of trying to find more work. Gervaise struggles to keep her home together, but her excessive pride leads her to a number of embarrassing failures and before long everything is going downhill. Gervaise becomes infected by her husband's newfound laziness and, in an effort to impress others, spends her money on lavish feasts and accumulates uncontrolled debt.

The home is further disrupted by the return of Lantier, who is warmly welcomed by Coupeau—by this point losing interest in both Gervaise and life itself, and becoming seriously ill. The ensuing chaos and financial strain is too much for Gervaise, who loses her laundry-shop and is sucked into a spiral of debt and despair. Eventually, she too finds solace in drink and, like Coupeau, slides into heavy alcoholism. All this prompts Nana—already suffering from the chaotic life at home and getting into trouble on a daily basis—to run away from her parents' home and become a casual prostitute.

Gervaise's story is told against a backdrop of a rich array of other well-drawn characters with their own vices and idiosyncrasies. Notable amongst these being Goujet, a young blacksmith, who spends his life in unconsummated love for the hapless laundress.

Eventually, sunk by debt, hunger and alcohol, Coupeau and Gervaise both die. The latter's corpse lies for two days in her unkempt hovel before it is noticed by her disdainful neighbors.

== Themes and criticism ==
Zola spent an immense amount of time researching Parisian street argot for his most realistic novel to that date, using a large number of obscure contemporary slang words and curses to capture an authentic atmosphere. His shocking descriptions of conditions in working-class 19th-century Paris drew widespread admiration for his realism and continue so to do. L'Assommoir was taken up by temperance workers across the world as a tract against the dangers of alcoholism, though Zola always insisted there was considerably more to his novel than that. The novelist also drew criticism from some quarters for the depth of his reporting, either for being too coarse and vulgar or for portraying working-class people as shiftless drunkards. Zola rejected both these criticisms out of hand; his response was simply that he had presented a true picture of real life.

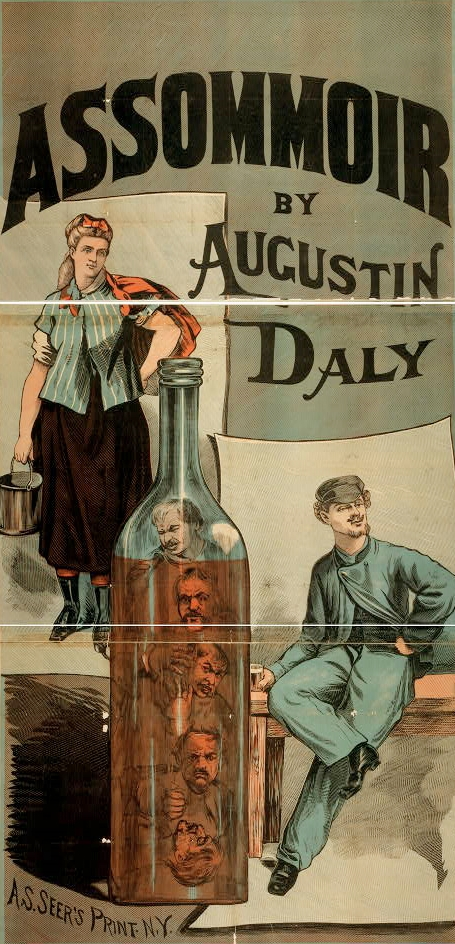
1879 poster for an American theatre production of L'Assommoir by Augustin Daly

== English translations ==
L'Assommoir has often been translated and there are several unexpurgated modern editions available. It is the most translated novel of the series. In 1884, Henry Vizetelly published an English-language translation of the novel with some edits designed not to offend the sensibilities of British audiences. However, the salacious nature of Zola's work (even in edited form) would see the Vizetellys vilified in parliament and later prosecuted for obscenity.

Translators have approached the title L'Assommoir in different ways. The noun is a colloquial term popular in late nineteenth-century Paris, referring to a shop selling cheap liquor distilled on the premises "where the working classes could drown their sorrows cheaply and drink themselves senseless". It is adapted from the French verb "assommer" meaning to stun or knock out. Perhaps the closest equivalent terms in English are the slang adjectives "hammered" and "plastered". English translators have rendered it as The Dram Shop, The Gin Palace, Drunkard, The Drinking Den or simply The Assommoir.

Oxford World's Classics issued two translations. The main difference is their approach to Zola's use of 19th-century Parisian slang. Mauldon (1995) used non-modern English to keep it feeling like the period. Nelson (2021) used modern slang to make the text as shocking and raw to modern readers.

=== Expurgated ===
1. L'Assommoir (1879, tr. Mary Neal Sherwood, T.B. Peterson & Bros.)
2. Gervaise (1879, tr. E. Binsse, G. W. Carleton & Co.)
3. The 'Assommoir' (1884, tr. George Moore and E. A. Vizetelly for H. Vizetelly, Vizetelly & Co.)
4. The Dram Shop (1897, tr. unknown, edited by E. A. Vizetelly, Chatto & Windus)
5. Drink (1903, tr. S.J.A. Fitzgerald, Greening & Co.)

=== Unexpurgated ===
1. L'Assommoir (1895, tr. Arthur Symons, Lutetian Society); later reprinted as Drunkard (Elek, 1958)
2. The Dram Shop (1951, tr. Gerard Hopkins, Hamish Hamilton)
3. The Gin Palace (1952, tr. Buckner B. Trawick, Avon Publications)
4. L'Assommoir (1962, tr. Atwood H. Townsend, New American Library)
5. L'Assommoir (1970, tr. Leonard Tancock, Penguin Books)
6. L'Assommoir (1995, tr. Margaret Mauldon, Oxford University Press)
7. The Drinking Den (2000, tr. Robin Buss, Penguin Books)
8. The Assommoir (2021, tr. Brian Nelson, Oxford University Press)

== Adaptations ==
The French film L'Assommoir (1909), directed by Albert Capellani.

The French film L'Assommoir (1921), directed by Maurice de Marsan and Charles Maudru.

The American film The Struggle (1931), directed by D. W. Griffith, is a loose adaptation of the novel.

The French film L'Assommoir (1933), directed by Gaston Roudès.

The French film Gervaise (1956), directed by René Clément, is an adaptation of the novel.

The Soviet film Zapadnia (Западня, 1972).
