= L'Arlésienne =

L'Arlésienne may refer to:

- "L'Arlésienne" (short story), an 1869 short story by Alphonse Daudet, later turned into a play
- L'Arlésienne (Bizet), musical works based on Georges Bizet's incidental music to Alphonse Daudet's play of the same name
  - L'Arlésienne, a 1974 ballet choreographed by Roland Petit to the music of Georges Bizet
- L'Arlésienne (painting), an 1888–1890 series of six paintings by Vincent van Gogh
- L'Arlésienne (1908 film), a French drama film
- L'Arlésienne (1942 film), a French drama film

== See also ==
- L'arlesiana, an 1897 opera by Francisco Cilea
