= Lillian Cook =

American actress

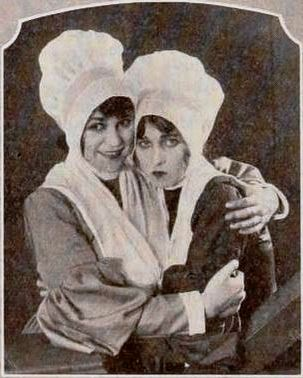
- Cook (right) in Betsy Ross (1917)
- Born: Lillian Agnes Cook; May 16, 1898; Hot Springs, Arkansas, US
- Died: March 14, 1918 (aged 19); New York City, US
- Resting place: Spring Grove Cemetery

Lillian Cook was an American actress who was active in Hollywood during the silent era.

== Biography ==
Cook was born in Hot Springs, Arkansas, to Joseph Cook and his wife Martha. An only child, she grew up primarily in Cincinnati before she moved to New York to pursue a career on the stage.

Cook died in her Manhattan apartment at the Hotel Remington at age 19 after appearing in dozens of silent films. Her early death may have been caused by her role as a fairy in Maurice Tourneur's The Blue Bird a year earlier: according to one account, the heavy wings that were part of her costume injured her spine and caused tuberculosis.

== Selected filmography ==
- The Blue Bird (1918)
- The Devil's Playground (1917)
- The Honeymoon (1917)
- Her Hour (1917)
- The Corner Grocer (1917)
- Betsy Ross (1917)
- Rasputin, the Black Monk (1917)
- Beloved Adventuress (1917)
- The Submarine Eye (1917)
- Darkest Russia (1917)
- The Common Law (1916)
- Sudden Riches (1916)
- As in a Looking Glass (1916)
- A Woman's Power (1916)
- Camille (1915)
- The Cotton King (1915)
- Mother (1914)
