= The Man from Nowhere (1937 film) =

- Directed by: Pierre Chenal
- Written by: Luigi Pirandello (play); Pierre Chenal; Christian Stengel; Armand Salacrou; Roger Vitrac
- Produced by: Michel Kagansky; Christian Stengel
- Starring: Pierre Blanchar; Isa Miranda; Catherine Fonteney
- Cinematography: Joseph-Louis Mundwiller
- Edited by: Pierre Chenal
- Music by: Jacques Ibert
- Production companies: Général Productions; Ala-Colosseum Film
- Distributed by: Société d'Édition et de Location de Films
- Release date: 19 February 1937
- Running time: 92 minutes
- Country: France
- Language: French

The Man from Nowhere (French: L'Homme de nulle part) is a 1937 French drama film directed by Pierre Chenal and starring Pierre Blanchar, Isa Miranda and Catherine Fonteney. It was made at the Cines Studios in Rome, and based on Luigi Pirandello's 1904 novel Il fu Mattia Pascal. A separate Italian-language version of the film was also produced.

It was a popular success, and was re-released in 1942.

The film's sets were designed by Guido Fiorini.

== Cast ==
- Pierre Blanchar as Mathias Pascal / Adrien Meis
- Isa Miranda as Louise Paléari
- Catherine Fonteney as La veuve Pescatore
- Ginette Leclerc as Romilda Pescatore Pascal
- Maximilienne as Tante Scholastique
- Palau as Le chevalier Titus
- Marcel Vallée as Le maire
- Charles Granval as Octavio Meis
- Pierre Alcover as Malagna
- Charlotte Barbier-Krauss as Angelica Bonafede Pascal
- Jean Hébey as Pomino
- René Génin as L'ivrogne
- Georges Douking as Le domestique simplet de la pension
- Marcel Lupovici as Béraldez
- Gaston Dupray as Le directeur du journal
- Robert Moor as Le fossoyeur
- Léonce Corne as L'hôtelier du Luxor
- Henri Giquel as Le docteur Basile
- Charles Léger as Le bibliothécaire à la retraite
- Yvonne Yma as Adèle Meis
- Paquita Claude as Mademoiselle Pépita
- Enrico Glori as Le coiffeur
- Dax Berthy as Le curé
- Leduc as Le fournisseur de la noce
- Margo Lion as Mademoiselle Caporale
- Sinoël as Henri Paléari - tuteur de Louise
- Robert Le Vigan as Le comte Papiano
- Ornella Da Vasto
- Louis Daquin
- Rita Livesi as Cabrini
- Edda Soligo as Une dame à la table de jeu

== Bibliography ==
- Goble, Alan. The Complete Index to Literary Sources in Film. Walter de Gruyter, 1999.
