= Jacques Montéran =

French cinematographer

- Born: 18 March 1882; Colombes, Hauts-de-Seine, France
- Died: 9 February 1947 (aged 64); Sézanne, Marne, France
- Occupation: Cinematographer
- Years active: 1914-1937 (film)

Jacques Montéran (1882–1947) was a French cinematographer. During the silent era he worked in the United States before returning to France. His son Roger Montéran also became a cinematographer.

== Selected filmography ==
- The Fairy and the Waif (1915)
- The Common Law (1916)
- The Foolish Virgin (1916)
- Shall We Forgive Her? (1917)
- The Marriage Market (1917)
- Good-Bye, Bill (1918)
- Come On In (1918)
- The Test of Honor (1919)
- Oh, You Women! (1919)
- The Fortune Teller (1920)
- The Money Maniac (1921)
- The Black Panther's Cub (1921)
- The Orchid Dancer (1928)
- Island of Love (1929)
- The Man at Midnight (1931)
- A Father Without Knowing It (1932)
- Shadows of Paris (1932)
- Aces of the Turf (1932)
- Broken Wings (1933)
- The Crime of Bouif (1933)
- Roger la Honte (1933)
- One Night's Secret (1934)
- Last Hour (1934)
- The Ideal Woman (1934)
- Madame Angot's Daughter (1935)
- The Flame (1936)

== Bibliography ==
- Edwards, Paul M. World War I on Film: English Language Releases through 2014. McFarland, 2016.
- Leteux, Christine . Albert Capellani: Pioneer of the Silent Screen. University Press of Kentucky, 2015.
- Soister, John T. Nicolella, Henry & Joyce, Steve. American Silent Horror, Science Fiction and Fantasy Feature Films, 1913-1929. McFarland, 2014.
