= Marie du Fresnay =

French writer

Marie du Fresnay (French pronunciation: [maʁi dy fʁɛnɛ]), or Maria du Fresnay, née Daminois (1809–1892), was a French writer.

She was the mistress of Honoré de Balzac, by whom she had a daughter, Marie-Caroline du Fresnay (b. 4 June 1834), the only child of the French author. Her own mother was the playwright and novelist Adèle Daminois.

She was also the mother of French knight Ange Du Fresnay and the ancestor of French writer and silent film director Guy du Fresnay as well as of French contemporary essayist and economist Philippe du Fresnay.

Her life inspired Balzac's most famous novel, Eugénie Grandet (1833), which depicted in part her family, who were living at the time in the French city of Sartrouville.

== Biography ==
In 1833, as he revealed in a letter to his sister, Balzac entered into a secret intrigue with Marie du Fresnay, who was then aged 24. Her marriage to Charles Antoine du Fresnay, a son of Charles du Fresnay, former mayor of Sartrouville (portrayed in Eugénie Grandet as Charles Grandet, a nephew of the former mayor of Saumur) had been a failure from the start, with a 23-year age difference between them. In this letter, Balzac reveals that the young woman had just come to tell him she was pregnant.

In 1834, eight months following Balzac's letter to his sister, Maria du Fresnay's daughter Marie-Caroline was born.

In 1839, she appears as the dedicatee of the second edition of Balzac's Eugenie Grandet under the pseudonym "Maria", which was her nickname in her social circle. This is also the year of birth of her second son and third child, Ange du Fresnay.

In 1850, she would inherit from Balzac a statue of the French sculptor Francois Girardon, which confirmed the rumor of his paternity. However, the link was only confirmed in 1946, when Maria's grandson Charles du Fresnay told French journalist and historian Roger Pierrot that Marie's nickname used to be "Maria".

== Bibliography ==
- Adam, Antoine (8 December 1956), "Marie du Fresnay, fille d'Eugénie Grandet et de Balzac", Les Lettres françaises (in French), pp. 632–648
- Gilbert Guislain, "Balzac", Studyrama, 2004 (page 81)
- de Balzac, Honoré (8 December 1839), Eugénié Grandet (in French), pp. 2–4
