= Paul Mounet =

French actor

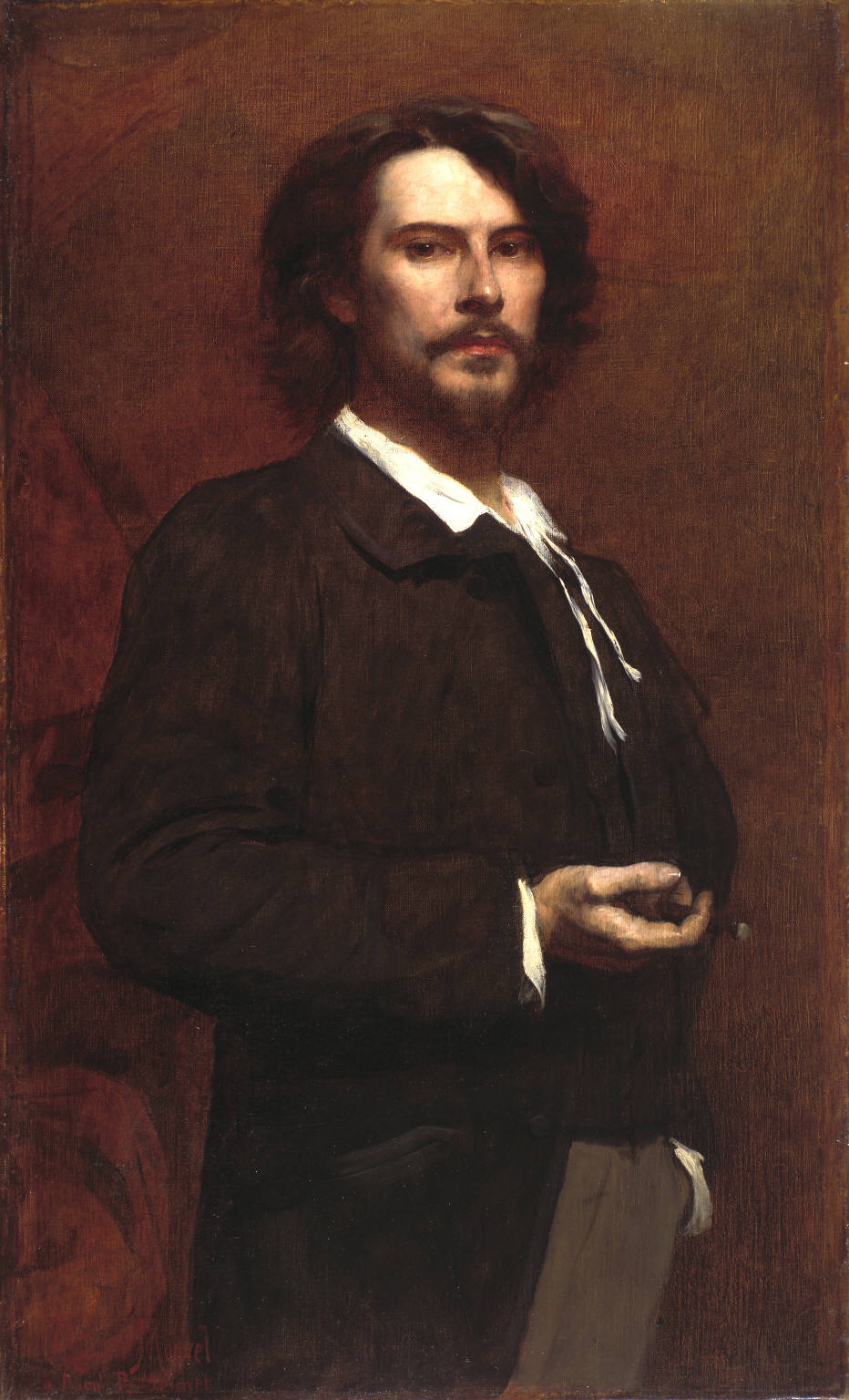
Paul Mounet, by Louis-Maurice Boutet de Monvel in 1875, aged 27 or 28

Paul Mounet (born Jean-Paul Sully; 5 October 1847 – 10 February 1922) was a French actor.

== Biography ==
The younger brother of actor Jean Mounet-Sully, Paul was born in Bergerac, Dordogne, and studied to become a medical doctor prior to his career in acting, only making his debut in 1880 in Paris Odéon's production of Horace. It was in 1889 that he first played at the Comédie Française, of which he became sociétaire two years later. Mounet garnered acclaim for his roles in Les Érinnyes, L'Arlésienne, Othello, Patrie, Hamlet, La Furie, Anthony, Le Roi, L'Enigme, Le Dédale, and Œdipe Roi.

Mounet appeared in a number of films, including playing the title character in a 1909 silent black-and-white version of Macbeth, directed by acclaimed French director André Calmettes.

He served as a professor at the Paris Conservatoire, teaching, among others, Pierre Fresnay, Valentine Tessier, Hélène Dieudonné, Daniel Mendaille, Françoise Rosay, and Marioara Ventura and became a Chevalier in the Legion of Honour.

Mounet died of heart disease on February 10, 1922.

== Filmography ==
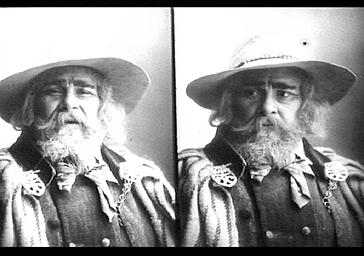
Paul Mounet in L'Arlésienne, taken by Nadar in 1885

- 1909: Rigoletto
- 1909: Macbeth as Macbeth
- 1909: The Return of Ulysses as Ulysses
- 1910: L'Héritière as Louis XI
- 1912: Les Jacobites
- 1917: Par la vérité

== Theater ==
- 1909: La Furie by Jules Bois, Comédie-Française
- 1913: Yvonic by Paul Ferrier and Jeanne Ferrier, Comédie-Française
- 1920: Romeo and Juliet by William Shakespeare, Comédie-Française
