= Aladdin and His Wonder Lamp =

1906 French silent short film

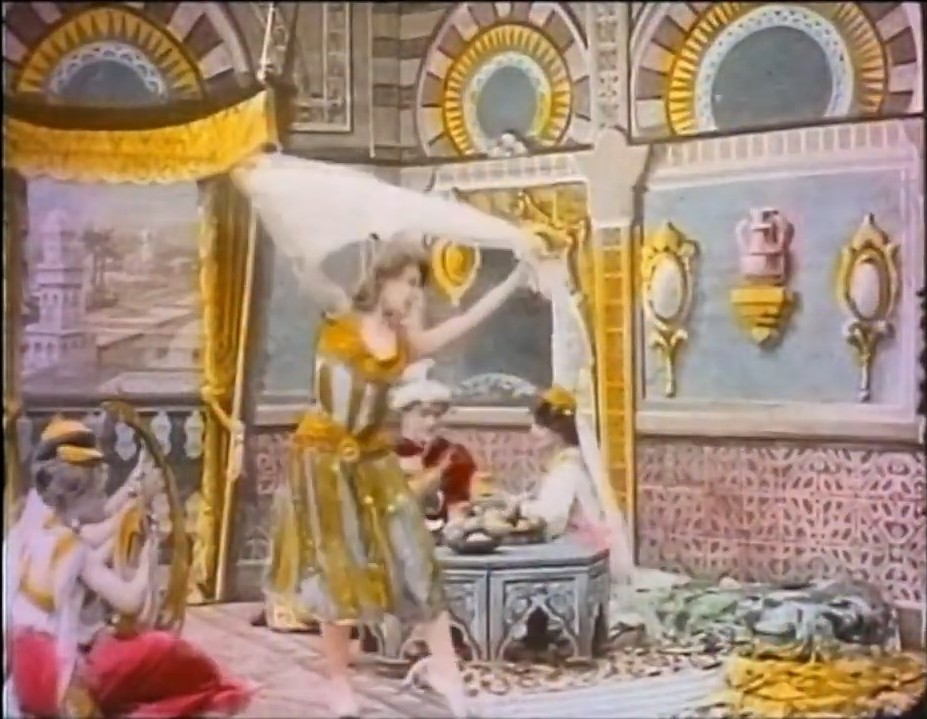
- French: Aladin ou la lampe merveilleuse
- Directed by: Albert Capellani
- Written by: André Heuzé
- Starring: Georges Vinter Paul Capellani Liane de Pougy
- Production company: Pathé Frères
- Distributed by: Pathé Frères
- Release date: 1906
- Running time: 12 minutes
- Country: France

Aladdin and His Wonder Lamp (French: Aladin ou la lampe merveilleuse) is a 1906 French silent trick film directed by Albert Capellani, inspired by the folk tale, "The Story of Aladdin; or, the Wonderful Lamp", first known in Europe through its 18th century populariser, Antoine Galland, who added the tale to his translation of One Thousand and One Nights. His version, the first appearance of Arabian Nights in Europe, was published as Les mille et une nuits, between 1704 and 1717. Galland had heard the "Aladdin" story from the Maronite traveller and storyteller Hanna Diyab, in Paris, probably in the French language. The film is the oldest surviving cinematographic adaptation of this tale.

== Plot ==
Aladdin, the son of a poor tailor, is hopelessly in love with the daughter of the Sultan. One day, he meets a sorcerer who takes him to an underground palace where he finds a lamp with marvelous properties. After many adventures, Aladdin brings back home the lamp and, thanks to this talisman, he and his mother acquire an immense wealth which allows him to marry his beautiful princess. However, the sorcerer, jealous of Aladdin's fortune, breaks into his house, steals the lamp and kidnaps the princess. Aladdin, back to his primitive poverty, recovers his wealth thanks to a fairy. He goes after the magician and punishes him for his temerity. He brings his wife back to his palace where a great feast is celebrated.

== Production and release ==
The film was produced by Pathé Frères and directed by Albert Capellani on a scenario written by André Heuzé. It was filmed in Pathé's Vincennes studio. The cinematographer was Segundo de Chomón who was also responsible for special effects and visual effects, including coloring with the stencil process Pathécolor. The film was included in the 9th series of Pathé's Féeries & Tales.

The film was released on 25 October 1906 in Denmark, in December 1906 in the United States and on 1 January 1907 in France.

== Analysis ==
The film consist of 6 scenes introduced by intertitles and composed of one to five shots, for a total of 18 shots.

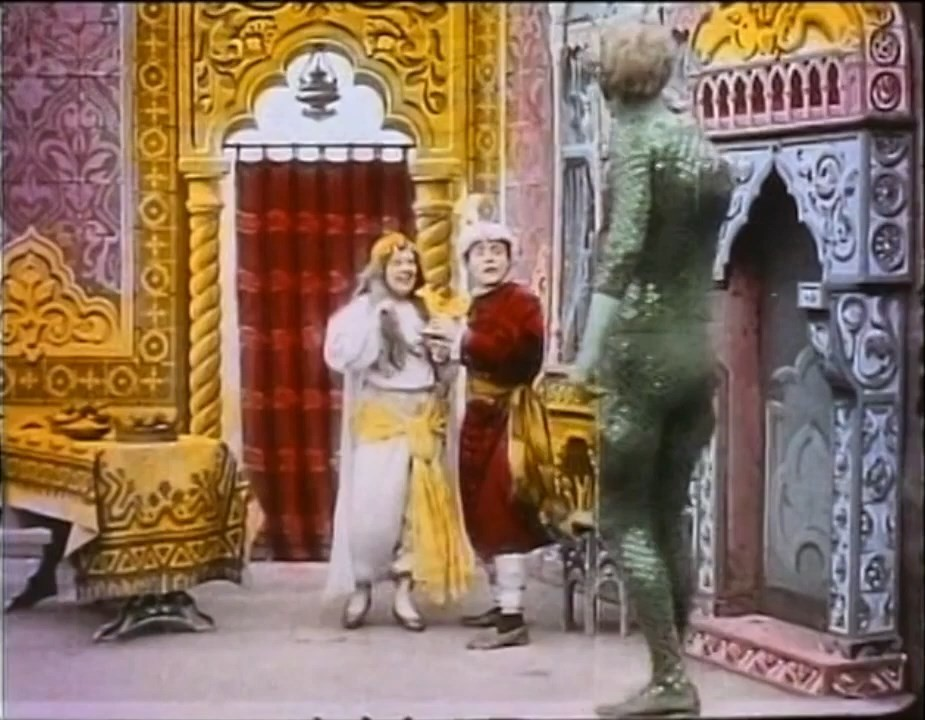
Scene 3

Scene 1: Aladdin's dream.

Aladdin is asleep and dreams of a princess. His mother wakes him up and he walks out.

Scene 2: Aladdin meets the princess.

Aladdin sees the princess passing in front of his house on horse back with her escort. A sorcerer promises him that he will be able to marry the princess if he follows his instructions.

Scene 3: In search of the lamp.

The sorcerer leads Aladdin to an underground palace with a garden with silver apples and a golden lamp. He brings back one apple and the lamp. When the sorcerer tries to take the lamp from him, he resists and the sorcerer leaves after walling in the exit. Aladdin rubs the lamp and a genie appears who frees him. Back at home, another genie brings him riches and turns his house into a palace.

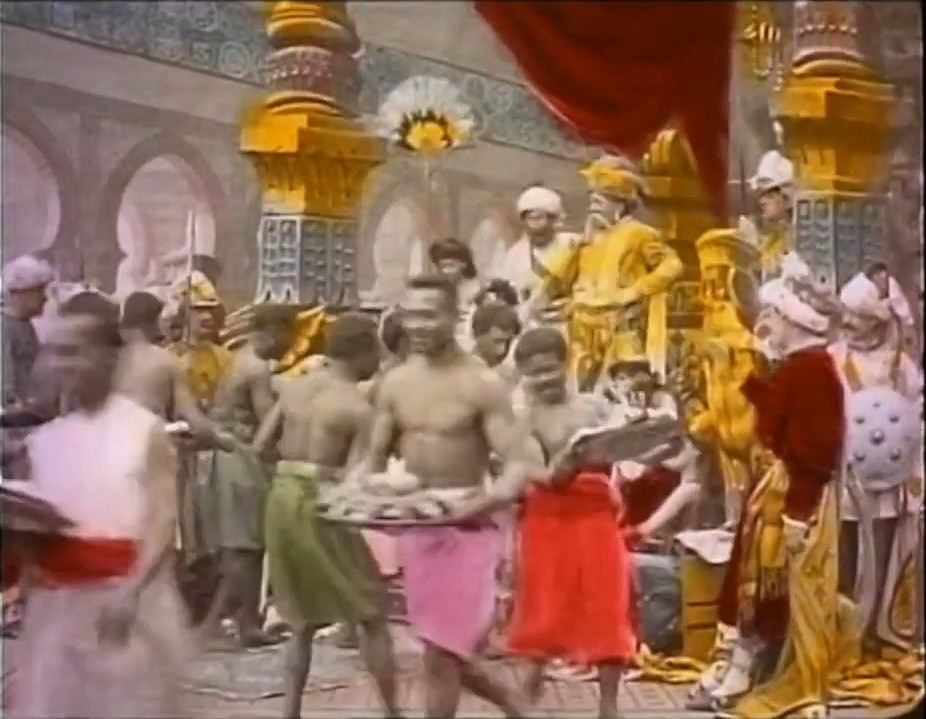
Scene 4

Scene 4: Aladdin wins the hand of the princess.

Aladdin is brought to the throne room of the palace of the sultan to whom he brings many presents. The sultan gives him his daughter's hand and Aladdin brings the princess to his palace.

Scene 5: The magician steals the lamp.

The sorcerer enters Aladdin's palace at night. He takes the lamp and rubs it, making a genie appear. With his help he abducts the princess and steals the lamp.

Scene 6: Triumph of Aladdin - Apotheosis.

Aladdin, back to his original poverty, comes out of his house, desperate. An old woman asks for alms. He gives her the silver apple he had taken in the enchanted garden. The old woman turns into a fairy who restore Aladdin's wealth. Inside Aladdin's palace, the magician is trying to overpower the princess. Aladdin comes running in and stabs him to death. The sultan enters with men at arms and embraces his daughter while Aladdin kisses his hand. With the help of various genies, Aladdin organises a great celebration.

Ian Wojik-Andrews relates Aladdin to A Trip to the Moon to conclude that both films are "important landmarks in the history of children's cinema and film, not just because they are two of the earliest adaptations of children's literature, but because in them Méliès and (Capellani) respectively invented and developed what we call now special effects." Richard Abel details in particular some of the tricks used: " In the opening tableau, for instance, Aladdin's desire is represented in an unusual dream image: while he sleeps in the foreground, a globular-edged frame fades in (as if attached, like a plaque) over the background wall, within which his double lifts a bedside curtain in order to pledge his love to the reclining princess." In the scene where a green giant appears, "an off screen platform in the foreground produces the illusion of his size."

The film has also been noted as characteristic of Pathé's "interest of revelation of space as such, which is (...) marked by the panning across sets in Au Pays Noir and Aladdin where the camera follows a character past a long backdrop." Richard Abel notes that Capellani not only uses pans but also multiple shot scenes "that trace Aladdin's movements through adjacent spaces", an early example of continuity editing.

== Cast ==
- Georges Vinter as The Lover
- Liane de Pougy as The Princess
- Paul Capellani
