= Good-Bye, Bill =

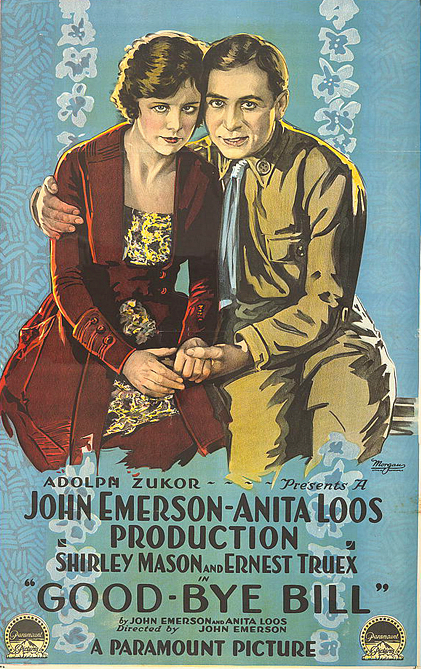
- Theatrical poster
- Directed by: John Emerson
- Screenplay by: John Emerson; Anita Loos
- Produced by: Adolph Zukor; John Emerson; Anita Loos
- Starring: Shirley Mason; Ernest Truex; Joseph Allen Sr. Joseph Burke; Carl De Planta; Henry S. Koser
- Cinematography: Jacques Montéran - (French Wikipedia)
- Production companies: John Emerson & Anita Loos Productions; Famous Players–Lasky Corporation
- Distributed by: Paramount Pictures
- Release date: December 15, 1918
- Running time: 50 minutes
- Country: United States
- Language: Silent (English intertitles)

Good-Bye, Bill is a lost 1918 American comedy silent film directed by John Emerson and written by John Emerson and Anita Loos. The film stars Shirley Mason, Ernest Truex, Joseph Allen Sr., Joseph Burke, Carl De Planta, and Henry S. Koser. The film was released on December 15, 1918, by Paramount Pictures.

== Cast ==
- Shirley Mason as Elsie Dresser
- Ernest Truex as Teddy Swift
- Joseph Allen Sr. as Kaiser William the Nut
- Joseph Burke as Herr Dresser
- Carl De Planta as Prince Willie
- Henry S. Koser as Herr Tonik
- J. Herbert Frank as Count Von Born Effry-Minutt
