= The Corner Grocer =

1917 American silent drama film

- Directed by: George Cowl
- Written by: Adolf Philipp (play); Lawrence McCloskey
- Starring: Lew Fields; Madge Evans; Lillian Cook
- Cinematography: Alex Nilson; Lucien Tainguy
- Production company: Peerless Productions
- Distributed by: World Film
- Release date: October 1, 1917
- Running time: 50 minutes
- Country: United States
- Languages: Silent; English intertitles

The Corner Grocer is a 1917 American silent drama film directed by George Cowl and starring Lew Fields, Madge Evans and Lillian Cook. It was shot at the Fort Lee studios in New Jersey.

== Plot summary ==
Kindhearted Charles Wendel, who has built his pushcart grocery business into a prosperous enterprise, adopts little eight-year-old Mary Brian after her mother dies in poverty. The little girl becomes the angel of the house, beloved by all. Wendel's dream is that his son Ralph will carry on the business, but when Ralph graduates from college, he decides that he is too good for the grocery business. Instead, he goes to work in a bank, where he falls prey to swindlers who convince him to forge his father's name on a $100,000 check. When the forgery is discovered, the old man covers the check at the cost of his own financial ruin. Ralph, chagrined, leaves home to make good and soon after returns, prosperous, to wed Mary and restore the fortune and happiness of the Wendel family.

== Cast ==
- Lew Fields as Charles Wendel
- Madge Evans as Mary Brian, age 8
- Lillian Cook as Mary Brian, age 18
- Nick Long Jr. as Ralph Wendel, age 10
- William Sherwood as Ralph Wendel, age 20
- Justine Cutting as Lena Wendel
- George Cowl as Oscar Leaming
- Pinna Nesbit as Stella
- Vivia Ogden as Old Maid
- Stanhope Wheatcroft as William

== Bibliography ==
- John Koegel. Music in German Immigrant Theater: New York City, 1840-1940. University Rochester Press, 2009.
