= Jeanne Delvair =

French actress (1877–1949)

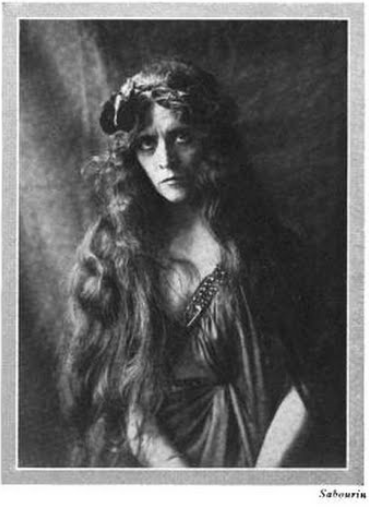
Jeanne Delvair as "Death", from a 1920 publication

Jeanne Delvair (December 19, 1877 – January 13, 1949) was a French stage and film actress of the early 20th century.

== Life ==
Delvair was born Jeanne Louise Deluermoz in Paris, France. She started acting in stage productions at an early age, and transitioned into film acting with her role portraying "Marie Stuart" in the 1908 film Marie Stuart. She followed that with the 1909 film Macbeth. From 1910 to 1923 she appeared in another fifteen films, as well as acting in stage productions. Her most recognizable film role during that period was portraying "Mary Tudor" in the 1917 film Marie Tudor. After 1923 she left film acting, but continued to act in theater. She was living in Levallois-Perret, France, at the time of her death on January 13, 1949.

== Selected filmography ==
- Marie Tudor (1912)
