= Catherine Fonteney =

French actress (1879–1966)

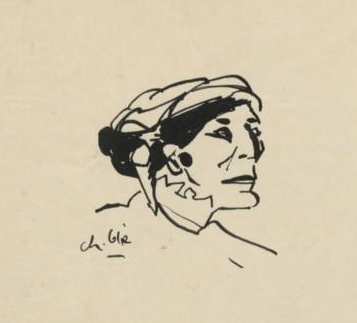
- Cartoon of Fonteney by Charles Gir, 1922
- Born: 23 June 1879; Paris, France
- Died: 29 April 1966 (aged 86); Dijon, Côte-d'Or, France
- Other name: Marie Alexandrine Catherine Fontaine
- Occupation: Actress
- Years active: 1908–1961 (film)

Catherine Fonteney (23 June 1879– 29 April 1966) was a French film actress.

Catherine Fonteney was born Marie Alexandrine Catherine Fontaine in Paris and died in Dijon.

== Selected filmography ==
- L'Assommoir (1909)
- Lord Arthur Savile's Crime (1922)
- Romain Kalbris (1923)
- The Secret of Polichinelle (1923)
- Little Devil May Care (1928)
- The Red Head (1932)
- Poliche (1934)
- The Midnight Prince (1934)
- Song of Farewell (1934)
- Beautiful Days (1935)
- Divine (1935)
- The Tender Enemy (1936)
- The Man from Nowhere (1937)
- Heroes of the Marne (1938)
- Troubled Heart (1938)
- Nightclub Hostess (1939)
- Grandfather (1939)
- The Lost Woman (1942)
- Wicked Duchess (1942)
- The Guardian Angel (1942)
- Mahlia the Mestiza (1943)
- Shop Girls of Paris (1943)
- The Angel They Gave Me (1946)
- The Lame Devil (1948)
- Darling Caroline (1951)
- Beautiful Love (1951)
- Under the Sky of Paris (1951)
- Trial at the Vatican (1952)
- The Lovers of Marianne (1953)
- I Spit on Your Grave (1959)
- The Long Absence (1961)

== Bibliography ==
- Goble, Alan. The Complete Index to Literary Sources in Film. Walter de Gruyter, 1999.
