= Sowing the Wind (1929 film) =

1929 film

- Directed by: Maurice Kéroul; Jacques Mills
- Written by: Lucie Delarue-Mardrus (novel)
- Starring: Alexandra; Claudie Lombard; Henri Baudin
- Cinematography: Geo Blanc
- Production company: Les Films Omega
- Distributed by: Films Élite
- Release date: 26 June 1929
- Country: France
- Languages: Silent; French intertitles

Sowing the Wind (French: Graine au vent) is a 1929 French silent drama film directed by Maurice Kéroul and Jacques Mills and starring Alexandra, Claudie Lombard and Henri Baudin. It is an adaptation of a novel by Lucie Delarue-Mardrus.

== Cast ==
- Alexandra as Alexandra dite 'Graine au vent'
- Claudie Lombard as Fernande
- Henri Baudin as Bruno Horp
- Céline James as Maman Germaine Horp
- Marcel Marfu as Un garde-chasse
- Pierre Casa as Un garde-chasse
- Mathilde Alberti as Madame Lebigle
- André Deed
- Vaslin

== See also ==
- Sowing the Wind, a 1944 film based on the same novel

== Bibliography ==
- Goble, Alan (1999). The Complete Index to Literary Sources in Film. Walter de Gruyter.
