= Macbeth (1909 French film) =

1909 French film directed by André Calmettes

- Directed by: André Calmettes
- Written by: Michel Carré
- Based on: Macbeth by William Shakespeare
- Produced by: Pathé Frères
- Starring: Jeanne Delvair, Paul Mounet
- Release date: 3 December 1909
- Country: France
- Language: Silent

Macbeth, is a silent 1909 film adaptation of the William Shakespeare play directed by André Calmettes. It was released on 3 December 1909. It is a silent black-and-white film with French intertitles. The film, "with its hand- somely illustrated intertitles and a busy cast moving with great collective precision ( within a frame used as a theatrical proscenium), made its way stateside just as the Vitagraph cycle [of Shakespeare adaptations, including Macbeth (1908 film)] was on its way."

== Plot ==
Macbeth, the Thane of Glamis, receives a prophecy from a trio of witches that one day he will become King of Scotland. Consumed by ambition and spurred to action by his wife, Macbeth murders his king and takes the throne for himself.

== Cast ==
- Paul Mounet as Macbeth
- Jeanne Delvair as Lady Macbeth
