= Wedding Night (1935 film) =

1935 film

- Directed by: Maurice Kéroul; Georges Monca
- Written by: Albert Barré and Henri Kéroul
- Based on: Une nuit de noces by Albert Barré and Henri Kéroul
- Produced by: Maurice Kéroul; Georges Monca
- Starring: Armand Bernard; Florelle; Robert Arnoux
- Cinematography: Henri Barreyre; Paul Portier
- Music by: Joseph Szulc
- Production companies: Films Éclat; Haussmann Films
- Distributed by: Films Éclat
- Release date: 30 August 1935
- Running time: 90 minutes
- Country: France
- Language: French

Wedding Night (French: Une nuit de noces) is a 1935 French comedy film directed by Maurice Kéroul and Georges Monca and starring Armand Bernard, Florelle and Robert Arnoux. The film's sets were designed by the art director Max Heilbronner. It is based on the play of the same title by Albert Barré and Henri Kéroul, previously adapted into a 1920 silent film Wedding Night and the later 1950 film Wedding Night.

== Cast ==
- Armand Bernard as Laverdet
- Florelle as Sidonie de Valpurgis
- Robert Arnoux as Gaston
- Claude May as Madeleine
- Julien Carette as Duvallier
- Marcel Carpentier
- Pauline Carton
- Lucette Desmoulins
- Jacques Fontange
- Max Lerel
- Georges Péclet
- Robert Sidonac
- Elmire Vautier

== Bibliography ==
- Goble, Alan. The Complete Index to Literary Sources in Film. Walter de Gruyter, 1999.
- Rège, Philippe. Encyclopedia of French Film Directors, Volume 1. Scarecrow Press, 2009.
