= Sowing the Wind (1944 film) =

1944 film

- Directed by: Maurice Gleize
- Written by: Steve Passeur; Maurice Gleize
- Based on: Sowing the Wind by Lucie Delarue-Mardrus
- Produced by: Josette France; Pierre Gurgo-Salice
- Starring: Jacques Dumesnil; Lise Delamare; Gisèle Casadesus
- Cinematography: Jules Kruger
- Edited by: Lucienne Déméocq
- Music by: Jean Hubeau
- Production company: Lux Film
- Distributed by: Lux Film
- Release date: 16 March 1944
- Running time: 90 minutes
- Country: France
- Language: French

Sowing the Wind (French: Graine au vent) is a 1944 French drama film directed by Maurice Gleize and starring Jacques Dumesnil, Marcelle Géniat and Lise Delamare. It is an adaptation of the 1925 novel of the same title by Lucie Delarue-Mardrus. The film's sets were designed by the art director Robert-Jules Garnier.

== Synopsis ==
When his wife dies giving birth to a son, a man rejects the child and he is sent away. However, the boy's elder sister takes the lead in taking care of the infant and eventually reconciles her father to him.

== Cast ==
- Jacques Dumesnil as Bruno
- Marcelle Géniat
- Lise Delamare as Fernande
- Carlettina as Alexandra
- Gisèle Casadesus as Germaine
- Paul Villé
- Michel de Bonnay
- Jean Samson
- Anne Vandène
- Henri Bargin
- Yvonne Carletti
- Maurice Dorléac
- Maurice Dumont
- Paul Faivre
- Ritou Lancyle
- Albert Malbert
- Léon Mazeau
- Christine Stahl
- Odette Talazac as La nourrice

== See also ==
- Sowing the Wind a 1929 silent film based on the same novel

== Bibliography ==
- Goble, Alan. The Complete Index to Literary Sources in Film. Walter de Gruyter, 1999.
