= André Deed =

French actor (1879–1940)

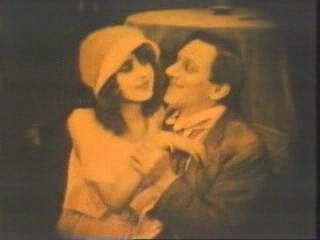
- André Deed (1921)
- Born: Henri André Augustin Chapais; 22 February 1879; Le Havre, France
- Died: 4 October 1940 (aged 61); Paris, France
- Occupations: Actor and director
- Years active: 1901–1939
- Spouse: Valentina Frascaroli

Boireau maçon (1913).

Henri André Chapais, known as André Deed (22 February 1879 – 4 October 1940), was a French actor and director, best known for his Foolshead comedies, produced in the 1900s and 1910s. André Deed was one of the first named actors in cinema, and his film series based around Foolshead were a global success.

== Life and career ==
Born Henri André Augustin Chapais in Le Havre on 22 February 1879, Chapais was the son of a customs official. The family moved to Nice when Henri André was young. Unusually for an actor, he attended lycée in Nice, while acting with a small theatre company.

=== Start of film and stage career ===
André Deed moved to Paris and began to appear in vaudeville theatre and cabaret, including at the Folies Bergère.

In 1901, cinema pioneer Georges Méliès directed André Deed in several films. Deed would later incorporate many of Méliès' trick-shots into his comedies.

=== Films for Pathé ===
Deed and his fellow performer Roméo Bosetti, who had been a circus acrobat, began working for Pathé in 1905.

=== Move to Italy and world tour ===
In 1908, Deed negotiated a lucrative move to the Itala studios in Turin, and he began starring in the Cretinetti comedy series directed by Giovanni Pastrone, an artist later thought by Martin Scorsese as the father of many innovations often attributed to D.W. Griffith and Cecil B. DeMille. Deed worked with an Italian crew consisting of Alberto Collo and Emilio Ghione, two local actors, and his future wife, Valentina Frascaroli. They were amongst the supporting cast in these films. In 1913, Deed embarked on a world theatrical tour with Frascaroli, taking in Europe and Latin America.

=== World War One ===
Despite being thirty-five years of age, André was conscripted into the reserves. In 1915, Giovanni Pastrone asked him to return to Turin to continue the Cretinetti series for Itala films. Deed made the feature film, Cretinetti e gli stivali del brasilero (Cretinetti and the Brazilian's boots), which featured Bartolomeo Pagano, the star of Cabiria and the Maciste series, in a cameo role.

By 191X, Deed returned to France and served in various logistics and infantry regiments. It is likely that he served in the trenches at some point, but nothing is known about his war service, beyond the dates of his transfers between regiments. In 1918, Deed married Valentina Frascaroli. Deed was demobilised in 1919.

=== Post-war period: between Italy and France ===
Deed planned a trilogy of fantasy-adventure films: Il documento umano (1920), L'Uomo Meccanico (The Mechanical Man) (1921) and Lo strano amore di Mado, which was never made.

=== End of career ===
Deed finished his career working as a warehouseman at the Pathe film studios located in the Parisian suburb of Joinville-le-Pont.

=== Death ===
André Deed died on 4 October 1940, and is buried at the Cimetière de Thiais, near Paris. He was survived by his wife, Valentina Frascaroli, who died in 1955.

== Pseudonym in various countries ==
- Italian: Cretinetti
- French: Boireau and Gribouille
- English: Foolshead
- Portuguese: Turíbio
- Russian: Glupyshkin
- Spanish: Toribio
- German: Müller
- Hungarian: Lehmann

== Selected filmography ==
- Miss Helyett (1928)
- Sowing the Wind (1929)

== Bibliography ==
- (Italian) Abrate, Piero and Longo, Germano (1997). Cento Anni di cinema in Piemonte. Turin: Abacus Edizioni.
- (Italian) Brunetta, Gian Piero (2008). Il cinema muto italiano. Bari: Laterza.
- Le Forestier, Laurent. Deed, André. Published in: Abel, Richard (ed.). (2005) Encyclopedia of Early Cinema. London: Routledge. Pages 168–169.
- (Italian) Lotti, Denis (2008). Emilio Ghione, l'ultimo apache. Bologna: Edizioni Cineteca di Bologna
