= Marie Tudor (1912 film) =

- Directed by: Albert Capellani
- Written by: Victor Hugo (play); Michel Carré
- Starring: Jeanne Delvair; Paul Capellani; Romuald Joubé
- Production company: Pathé Frères
- Distributed by: Pathé Frères
- Release date: 1912
- Country: France
- Languages: Silent; French intertitles

Marie Tudor is a 1912 French silent historical film directed by Albert Capellani and starring Jeanne Delvair, Paul Capellani and Romuald Joubé. The film is an adaptation of Victor Hugo's 1833 play of the same title set at the court of Mary I of England. It was re-released in 1917, and is sometimes dated to that year.

== Cast ==
- Jeanne Delvair as Marie Tudor
- Paul Capellani as Fabiano Fabiani
- Romuald Joubé as Gilbert
- Léon Bernard
- Andrée Pascal
- Léa Piron
- Henri-Amédée Charpentier

== Bibliography ==
- Parrill, Sue & Robison, William B. The Tudors on Film and Television. McFarland, 2013.
