= The Bell Ringer's Daughter =

1906 French silent short film

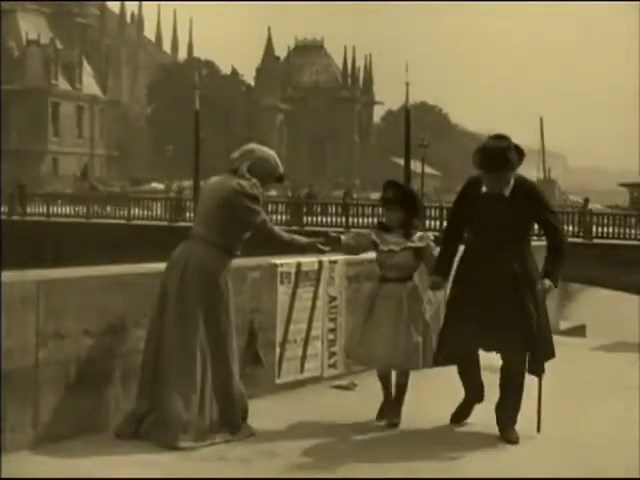
- French: La fille du sonneur
- Directed by: Albert Capellani
- Written by: André Heuzé
- Starring: Gabriel Moreau; Renée Coge; Ransart
- Production company: Pathé Frères
- Distributed by: Pathé Frères
- Release date: 1906
- Running time: 10 minutes
- Country: France

The Bell Ringer's Daughter (French: La fille du sonneur) is a 1906 French silent short film directed by Albert Capellani. It is a melodrama about a young woman seduced and abandoned with her baby.

== Plot ==
An old man is loudly ringing the bells of a church. His daughter is waiting for him. He finds her ready to go out: an errand in a hurry, she explains. An elegant young man is waiting for her in his car. They go the Bois de Boulogne. In the church tower, the old man is waiting, feeling an unknown dread growing in his heart. He looks at the silhouette of Paris fading into the night. The old man, alone in front of the enormous gargoyles, like impassive monsters, falls back, overwhelmed, his head in his hands.

In another part of the city, in a gambling den, her lover plays and loses. In a garret, his mistress is waiting for him. The man returns, haggard-eyed, and forces his wife, despite her frightened pleas, to rob her father's money. When the old man returns, he finds the room in disarray, the safe empty. An object on the floor that belonged to his daughter reveals who the culprit was. He curses his daughter.

In the garret, the lover chases away his lover and their baby. She flees into the night and her frantic walk leads her to the Seine. A sailor holds her back just as she is about to commit suicide. Instinct then takes her back to the place of her childhood. She leaves her baby on the steps of the church, where he is taken in by the old bell ringer.

Ten years later, the grandfather and the little girl are walking on the quay of the Seine. A beggar holds out her hand. The little girl gives her a coin, not knowing she is her mother, but she recognizes her father. She follows them in a public park where she hugs her daughter and tell her who she is. Her father chases her away and leaves hurriedly with the child. She goes to her father's lodging. He wants to chase her away again, but the little girl's intercession disarms the old man and suddenly makes all his resentment crumble at the shock of a feeling of paternal pity.

== Production and Release ==
The film was produced by Pathé Frères and directed by Albert Capellani, who was specializing in "realist dramas", on a scenario written by André Heuzé. It was partly filmed in Pathé's Vincennes studio and partly on location in Paris.

The film was included in the 8th series of Pathé's Scènes dramatiques et réalistes. It was released on 4 November 1906 in Marseille, France, and the United States.

== Analysis ==
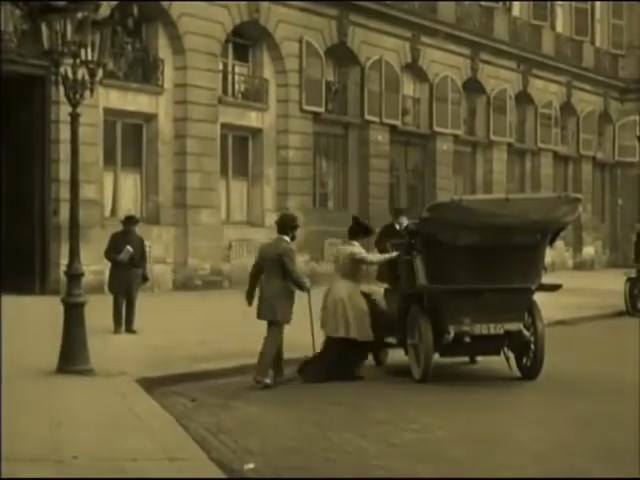
Shot 4
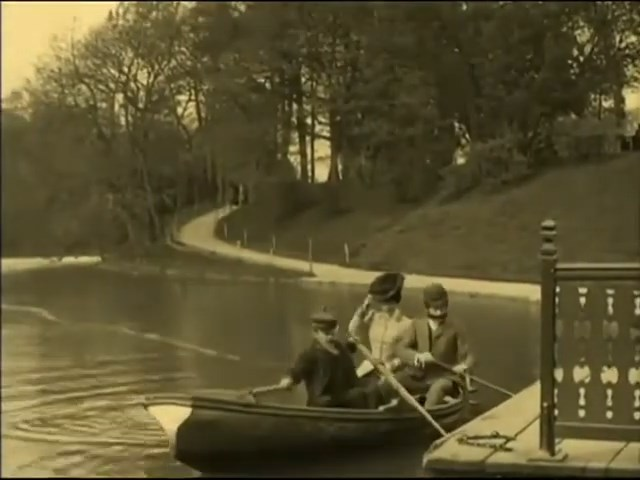
Shot 6
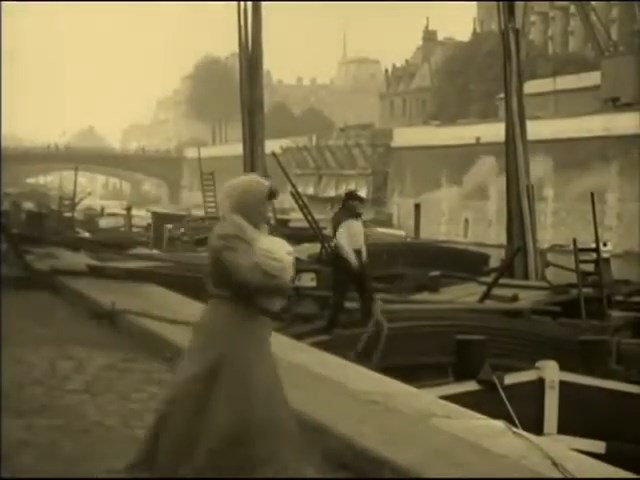
Shot 20

The film is composed of 25 shots without any intertitle. The viewer understands from the context that one or two years have elapsed between shots 13 and 14, and several years between shots 21 and 22. Camera movements and continuity editing are used to follow characters as they move from one place to another, and cross-cutting is used to alternate between the actions of the old man and those of his daughter.

1. The inside of a bell tower. A man rings the church bells, then leaves the room.
2. The bell ringer's office. The bell ringer's daughter puts on her hat, kisses her father, then leaves the room.
3. The facade of a church. The daughter walks down the stairs in front of the church and exits left.
4. A street in Paris. The daughter meets her lover. The camera pans right to follow the pair as they walk towards a motor car and board it. The car exits right.
5. An alley in the Bois de Boulogne. The motor car drives towards the camera and stop in front of it. The daughter and her lover alight and the camera pans left to follow them as they walk. They exit left, passing a lamppost where is written Chalet des Iles.
6. The boat landing stage on a lake in the Bois de Boulogne. The daughter and her lover walk down a path toward the landing, and the camera pans left as they board a rowboat and are rowed away.
7. The lake seen from the island. The rowboat lands and the daughter and her lover go ashore.
8. The terrace of the Chalet des Iles. The daughter and her lover enter right and join a group of friends sitting at a table. After having a drink they leave the table and enter the building.
9. Same as 2. The bell ringer walks nervously in his office and leaves through the door.
10. A terrace at the top of a church with carved gargoyles. The bell ringer comes out and looks over the parapet.
11. Point of view shot. The camera pans left to show a panorama of Paris taken from a church tower. It ends with a view of a gargoyle.
12. Same as 10. The bell ringer raises his arms in despair and walks back in.
13. Same as 2. The bell ringer walks in looking desperate, sits down and buries his head in his hands.
14. A luxurious room with men playing cards around a table. The lover plays cards and loses. He shows his empty wallet and leaves the room, furious.
15. A poorly furnished room with a bed. The lover comes in and has an animated discussion with the daughter. He obliges her to leave the room with him.
16. Same as 2. The daughter enters, followed by her lover. He opens the safe, takes the money which is in it and they both leave.
17. Same as 2. The father enters and discovers with despair among the contents of the safe spread on the ground an object belonging to his daughter. He sits down and buries his head in his hands.
18. Same as 15. The daughter is sitting on the bed looking at a baby lying asleep. The lover is shouting at her. He picks up a chair and throws it on the ground. He picks up the baby, put it in his mistress's arms, pushes her out of the room and throws himself on the bed.
19. The door of a shabby building. The daughter comes out with the baby in her arms and exits left.
20. A quay along the Seine with several moored barges. The daughter kneels down on the edge of the quay and makes the sign of the cross. A sailor comes running and convinces her not to jump into the water.
21. A stage set representing the front of a church. The daughter walks in a leaves her baby on the steps of the church. Shortly after the father comes out and picks the baby while the daughter looks over, hidden by the fence.
22. A quay along the Seine. The bell ringer's daughter stands, poorly dressed in a begging attitude. Her father, holding a little girl's hand walk towards her and the little girl give her a coin as they walk past her without recognizing her and exit left. The daughter follows them.
23. The entrance of a public park. The bell ringer and the little girl walk towards the camera, followed by the daughter. They turn right to enter the park and the camera pans left to follow them.
24. A bench and a chair in a public park. The bell ringer and the little girl walk in and the bell ringer sits on a chair. The daughter sits on a nearby bench, watching them. The little girl, playing to roll a hoop comes to the bench where the daughter is sitting and the latter grabs her and kiss her. The bell ringer comes running and tears the little girl away from her and walks away with the little girl.
25. Same as 2. The bell ringer is having lunch with the little girl. The daughter comes in and kneels down at her father's feet. The father pushes her away and shows her the door but the little girl embraces her and drawing the bell ringer by the arm, convinces him to embrace his daughter. She kneels at his feet and he puts his hand on her head and his arm around the little girl's shoulders.

== Cast ==
- Gabriel Moreau as The Lover
- Renée Coge as The Bell Ringer's Daughter
- Ransart as The Bell Ringer's Granddaughter
