= Three Days Leave =

1936 film

- Directed by: Maurice Kéroul; Georges Monca
- Written by: Maurice Kéroul; Georges Monca
- Produced by: Charles Bauche; Max Lerel
- Starring: Alice Tissot; André Berley; Dolly Davis
- Cinematography: Georges Asselin
- Music by: Rinaldo Rinaldi
- Production company: Productions Charles Bauche
- Distributed by: Transunivers Films
- Release date: 26 June 1936
- Running time: 86 minutes
- Country: France
- Language: French

Three Days Leave (French: Trois jours de perm) is a 1936 French comedy film directed by Maurice Kéroul and Georges Monca and starring Alice Tissot, André Berley and Dolly Davis. The film's sets were designed by the art director Jean Douarinou.

== Cast ==
- Alice Tissot
- André Berley
- Dolly Davis
- Jacqueline Daix
- Georges Péclet
- Nicolas Amato
- Rose Avril
- Jean Dumontier
- Jean Florent
- Claudette France
- Claire Gérard
- Max Lerel
- Paul Mathes
- Maurice Meral
- Marcel Rouzé
- Louis Scott

== Bibliography ==
- Bessy, Maurice & Chirat, Raymond. Histoire du cinéma français: 1935-1939. Pygmalion, 1986.
- Crisp, Colin. Genre, Myth and Convention in the French Cinema, 1929-1939. Indiana University Press, 2002.
- Rège, Philippe. Encyclopedia of French Film Directors, Volume 1. Scarecrow Press, 2009.
