= Romain Kalbris =

1923 film

- Directed by: Georges Monca
- Written by: Hector Malot
- Starring: Fabien Haziza; Catherine Fonteney; Jacqueline Passo
- Production company: Pathé Frères
- Distributed by: Pathé Consortium Cinéma
- Release date: 23 February 1923
- Country: France
- Languages: Silent; French intertitles

Romain Kalbris is a 1923 French silent adventure film directed by Georges Monca and starring Fabien Haziza, Catherine Fonteney and Jacqueline Passo. It is an adaptation of Hector Malot's 1869 novel of the same title.

== Cast ==
- Fabien Haziza as Romain Kalbris
- Catherine Fonteney as Madame Kalbris
- Jacqueline Passo as Diélette
- Charlotte Barbier-Krauss
- Gabrielle Chalon
- Max Charlier
- Ferrat
- Fernand Godeau
- Georges Gorby
- Herman Grégoire
- Armand Numès
- Orvieres

== Bibliography ==
- Philippe Rège. Encyclopedia of French Film Directors, Volume 1. Scarecrow Press, 2009.
