= The Honeymoon =

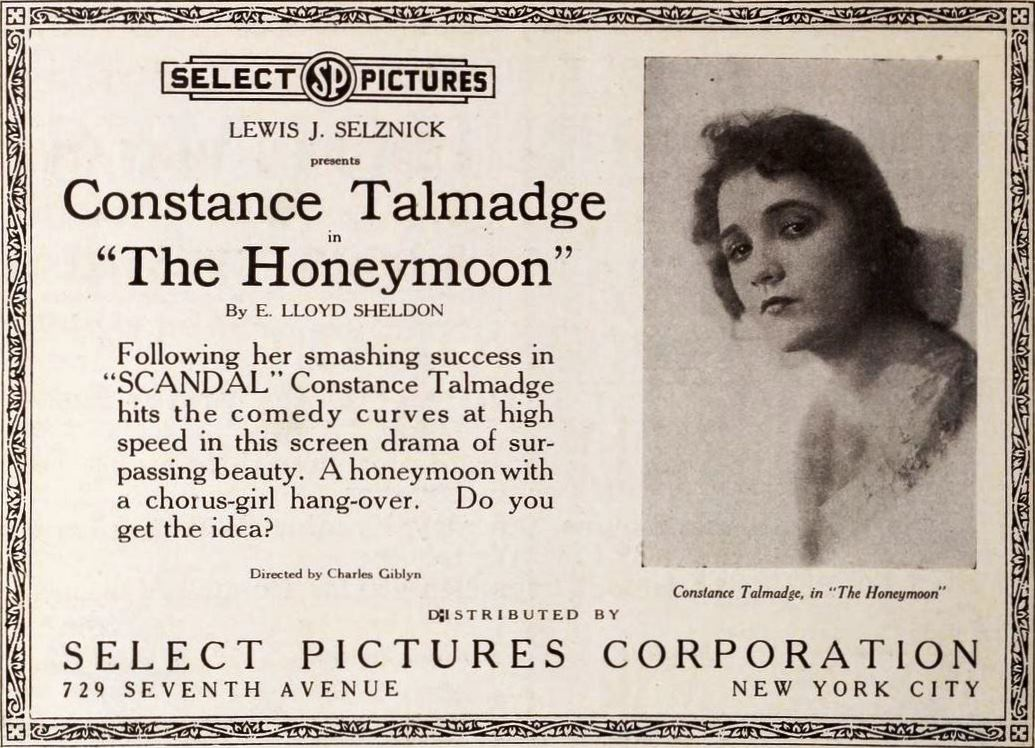
- Advertisement
- Directed by: Charles Giblyn
- Written by: E. Lloyd Sheldon
- Produced by: Lewis J. Selznick
- Starring: Constance Talmadge; Earle Foxe; Maude Turner Gordon
- Production company: Select Pictures
- Distributed by: Select Pictures
- Release date: December 22, 1917
- Running time: 5 reels
- Country: United States
- Language: Silent (English intertitles)

The Honeymoon is a 1917 American silent comedy film directed by Charles Giblyn and starring Constance Talmadge, Earle Foxe, and Maude Turner Gordon.

== Cast ==
- Constance Talmadge as Susan Lane
- Earle Foxe as Richard Greer
- Maude Turner Gordon as Mrs. Lane
- Russell Bassett as Uncle Jimmy Lane
- Harris Gordon as Philip Lane
- Lillian Cook as Marion Starr
- Julia Burns as Maizie Middletown
- Sam Coit as Robert Moody

== Preservation ==
The film is now lost with no known prints surviving.

== Bibliography ==
- Donald W. McCaffrey & Christopher P. Jacobs. Guide to the Silent Years of American Cinema. Greenwood Publishing, 1999. ISBN 0-313-30345-2
