= De la coupe aux lèvres =

1920 film

- Directed by: Guy du Fresnay
- Written by: Guy du Fresnay
- Starring: Marguerite Madys, Paul Capellani
- Release date: 1920
- Country: France
- Language: Silent film

De la coupe aux lèvres is a 1920 French silent film directed by Guy du Fresnay.

== Cast ==
- Marguerite Madys
- Paul Capellani
