= Camille (1915 film) =

1915 film by Albert Capellani

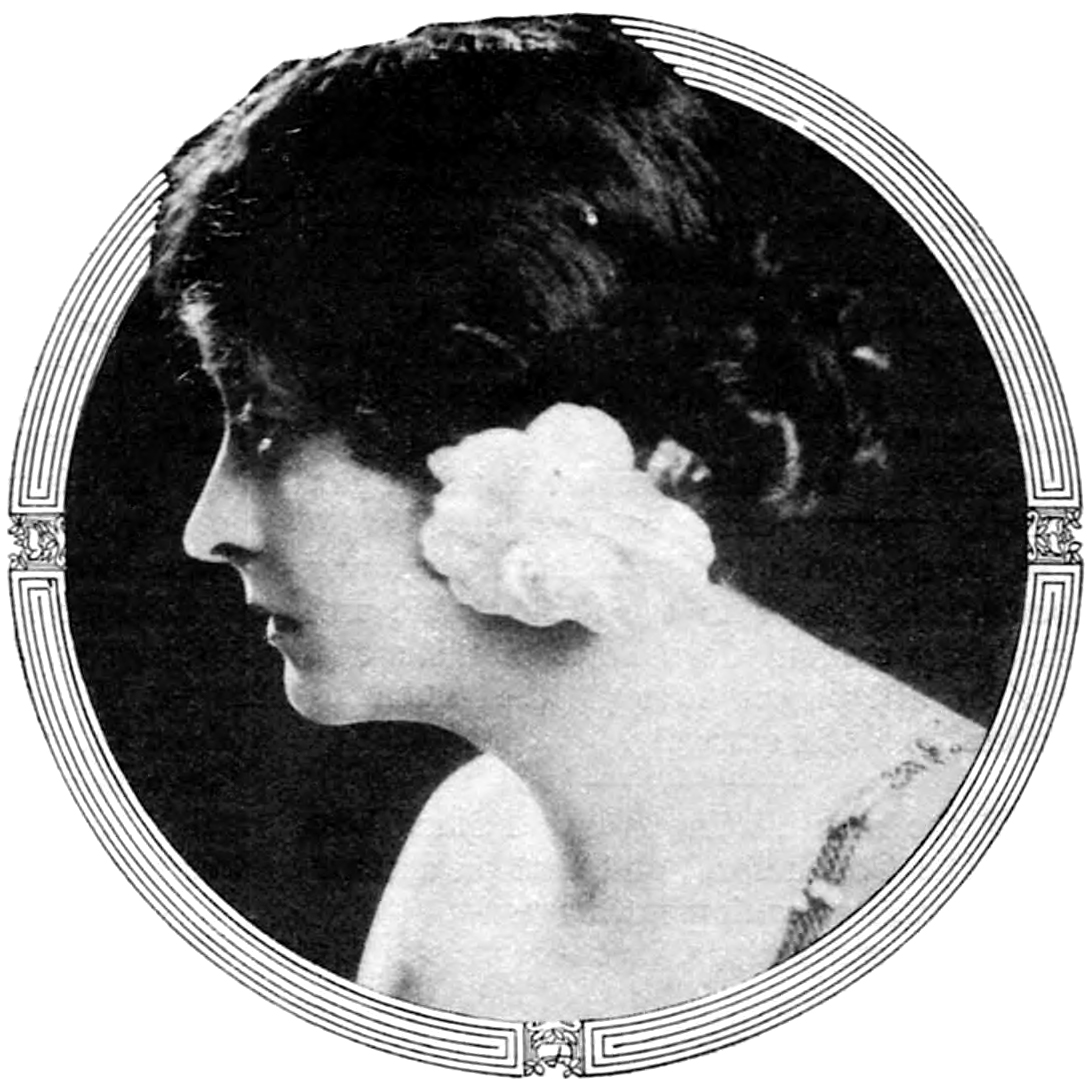
- Clara Kimball Young as courtesan Marguerite Gautier in Camille
- Directed by: Albert Capellani
- Written by: Frances Marion
- Based on: La Dame aux Camélias; 1848 novel by Alexandre Dumas, fils
- Starring: Clara Kimball Young; Paul Capellani
- Cinematography: Lucien Andriot
- Distributed by: World Film Company
- Release date: December 27, 1915
- Country: United States
- Language: Silent film

Camille is a 1915 American silent film based on the story La Dame aux Camélias (The Lady of the Camellias) by Alexandre Dumas, fils, first published in French as a novel in 1848 and as a play in 1852. Adapted for the screen by Frances Marion, Camille was directed by Albert Capellani and starred Clara Kimball Young as Marguerite Gautier and Paul Capellani as her lover, Armand.

== Cast ==
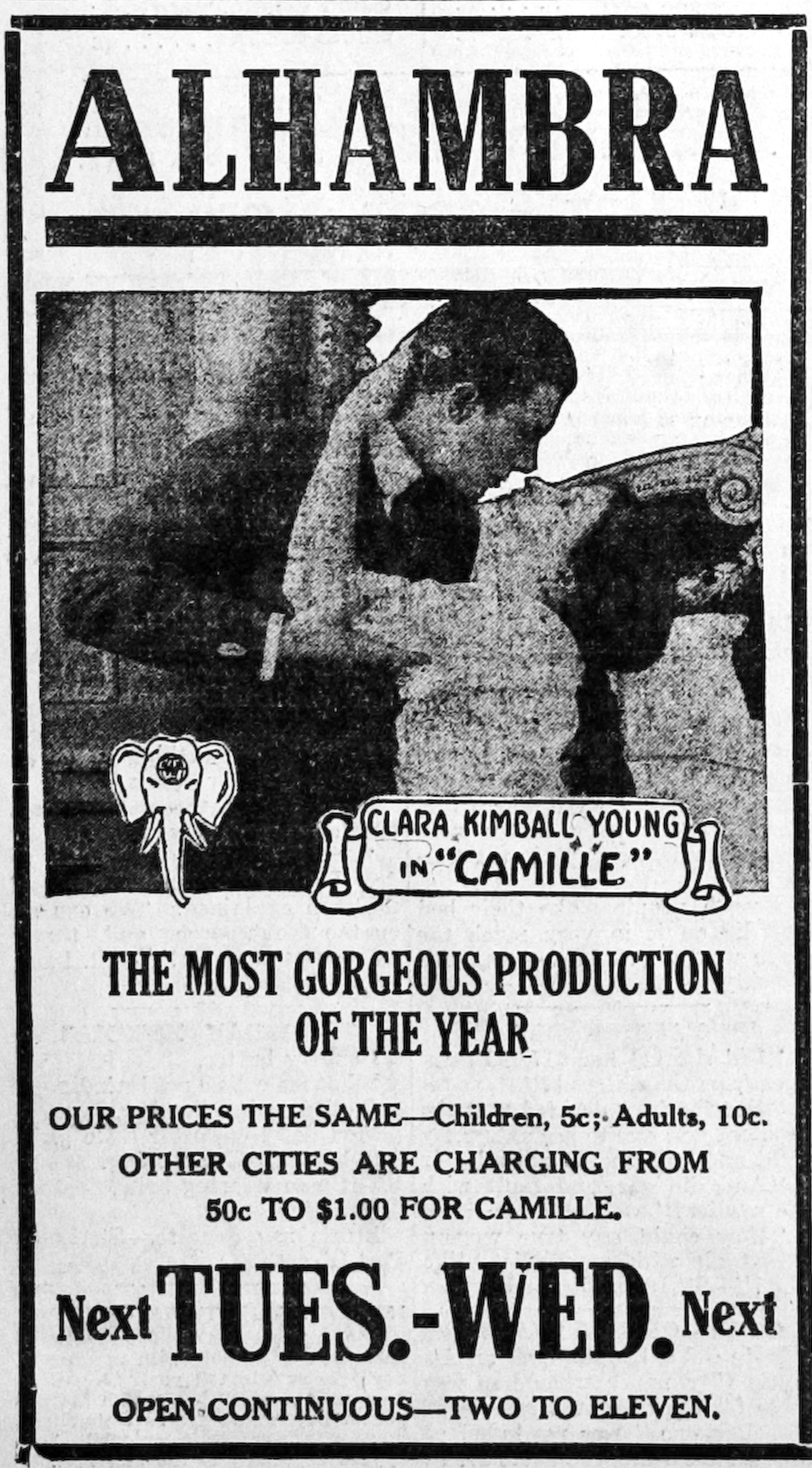
Advertisement for Camille, featuring Clara Kimball Young and Paul Capellani

- Clara Kimball Young as Marguerite Gautier
- Paul Capellani as Armand Duval
- Lillian Cook as Cecile
- Robert Cummings as Monsieur Duval
- Dan Baker as Joseph
- Stanhope Wheatcroft as Robert Bousac
- Frederick Truesdell as the Count de Varville
- William Jefferson as Gaston
- Edward Kimball as The doctor
- Louise Ducey as Madame Prudence
- Beryl Morhange as Nanine
