= Nick Long Jr. =

- Born: Nicholas Long Jr. August 14, 1904; Greenlawn, New York, U.S.
- Died: August 31, 1949 (aged 43); New York, U.S.
- Resting place: Cypress Hills Cemetery
- Occupation: actor
- Years active: 1915-1941

Nick Long Jr. (August 14, 1904 – August 31, 1949) was an American actor and dancer. During silent film era, Nick Long Jr. appeared as a child actor in films. As a dancer, he appeared primarily in revue films. He was also a very active actor in Broadway revues and out of Broadway. His most famous acting part was of Basil Newcombe in the film Broadway Melody of 1936.

== Career ==
Nick Long Jr. was the son of Nick Long Sr. and Idele Cotton, both parents were vaudeville and theater actors. Nick's father starred a silent film movie in 1925. Nick Long Jr. was already on the stage at the age of nine, mainly in productions with his parents. He appeared for the first time in front of the camera in 1915, at the age of nine. Some more movies followed, in which he acted when he was a child actor, before retiring from film acting in the 1930s. During the 1920s he acted in independent plays, specially in Broadway musicals.

In Broadway he worked with actors like José Ferrer, Bob Hope, Irene Dunne and Clifton Webb.

In the mid-1930s he appeared in three films, where he played secondary acting parts and of dancing. From 1931 and again from 1934 to 1939 he worked as an actor and dancer in London, along with Danny Kaye, that was at the start of his career; he danced in Autumn Leaves of Frederick Ashton in London and Manchester.

In 1939 he was recruited to fight in the Second World War, but he was released seven months later. He died in a traffic accident in 1949.

== Filmography ==
- Hearts of Men (1915) - Bad Little Boy (as Nicholas Long Jr.)
- The Corner Grocer (1917) - Ralph Wendel, age 10
- Adventures of Carol (1917) - Beppo (as Nicholas Long)
- The Oakdale Affair (1919) - Willie Case
- Broadway Melody of 1936 (1935) - Basil Newcombe
- King of Burlesque (1936) - Anthony Lamb
- Autumn Laughter (1938)

== Selected stage credits ==
- Lady Butterfly (1923)
- Kitty's Kisses (1926)
- She's My Baby (1928)
- Say When (1934-1935)
- Autumn Leaves (1939)
- Louisiana Purchase (1940)
