= Miss Helyett (1928 film) =

1928 film

- Directed by: Maurice Kéroul; Georges Monca
- Based on: Miss Helyett by Maxime Boucheron
- Starring: Marie Glory; Fernand Fabre; Pierre Hot
- Cinematography: Enzo Riccioni
- Production companies: Grandes Productions Cinématographiques; Phocea Film
- Distributed by: Inter-Films
- Release date: 11 May 1928
- Country: France
- Languages: Silent; French intertitles

Miss Helyett is a 1928 French silent comedy film directed by Maurice Kéroul and Georges Monca and starring Marie Glory, Fernand Fabre and Pierre Hot. It is based on the operetta of the same name by Maxime Boucheron and Edmond Audran. The film's sets were designed by the art director Robert Dumesnil.

== Cast ==
- Marie Glory as Miss Helyett Smithson
- Fernand Fabre as Le négociant James Richter
- Pierre Hot as Le pasteur Smithson
- Mary-Hett as La señora Fernandez
- Gaston Norès as Le peintre Paul Landrin
- Alfred Zorilla as Le toréador Puycardas
- Leda Ginelly as Manueka
- Noëlle Mato as Norette
- Jean Delannoy as Paul Bacarel
- André Deed as Le vieux monsieur de la montagne

== Bibliography ==
- Goble, Alan. The Complete Index to Literary Sources in Film. Walter de Gruyter, 1999.
- Rège, Philippe. Encyclopedia of French Film Directors, Volume 1. Scarecrow Press, 2009.
