= Hal Young =

British cinematographer (1890–1970)

- Born: 1890; England, United Kingdom
- Died: 1970 (aged 79–80); Hertfordshire, United Kingdom
- Other name: Harold Young
- Occupation: Cinematographer
- Years active: 1915–1954 (film)

Hal Young (1890–1970) was a British cinematographer. After gaining experience in Hollywood he returned to his native Britain where he was employed by Gainsborough Pictures.

== Selected filmography ==
- The Common Law (1916)
- The Foolish Virgin (1916)
- The Price She Paid (1917)
- Scandal (1917)
- Private Peat (1918)
- The Studio Girl (1918)
- My Cousin (1918)
- Here Comes the Bride (1919)
- Come Out of the Kitchen (1919)
- Anne of Green Gables (1919)
- The Witness for the Defense (1919)
- Civilian Clothes (1920)
- The Great Day (1920)
- Appearances (1921)
- The Mystery Road (1921)
- The Call of Youth (1921)
- Burn 'Em Up Barnes (1921)
- Fox Farm (1922)
- The Rat (1925)
- The Prude's Fall (1925)
- The Triumph of the Rat (1926)
- The Lodger (1927)
- Suspense (1930)
- Tons of Money (1930)
- Many Waters (1931)
- Love on the Spot (1932)
- The Television Follies (1933)
- Broken Blossoms (1936)

== Bibliography ==
- MacNab, Geoffrey. Searching for stars: stardom and screen acting in British cinema. Casell, 2000.
