= Guy du Fresnay =

Guy Du Fresnay
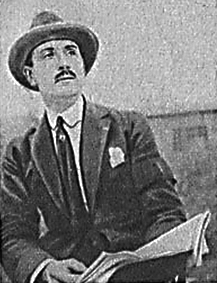
- Born: 23 November 1877; France
- Died: 20 September 1937 (aged 59); France
- Occupation: Silent film director
- Years active: 1918—1923

Guy Du Fresnay (French pronunciation: [ɡi dy fʁɛnɛ]; 1877-1937) was a French writer and silent film director best known for his silent films of the late 1910s and early 1920s. He was awarded the Legion of Honor in 1919.

He is the descendant of French writer Maria Du Fresnay and of French knight Ange Du Fresnay as well as the ancestor of French essayist and economist Philippe Du Fresnay.

== Biography ==
He started as a writer, then became a scenarist and film director.

He worked notably for Gaumont.

== Filmography ==
- Démon du foyer, Le (1912)
- Jardin du pirate, Le (1918)
- Cathédrale merveilleuse, La (1918)
- De la coupe aux lèvres (1920)
- Ami des montagnes, L' (1920)
- Ailes s'ouvrent, Les (1921)
- Margot (1922)
- Frou-Frou (1923)

== Bibliography ==
- Magazine "Ciné pour tous", No 66, 20 Mai 1921, lien url: http://www.cineressources.net/images/periodiques/o000/401.pdf
- Magazine "Cinéa", No 52, 5 Mai 1922, page 1, lien url: http://www.cineressources.net/images/periodiques/o000/494.pdf

== See also ==
- Ange Du Fresnay
- Maria Du Fresnay
