= L'Arlésienne (1908 film) =

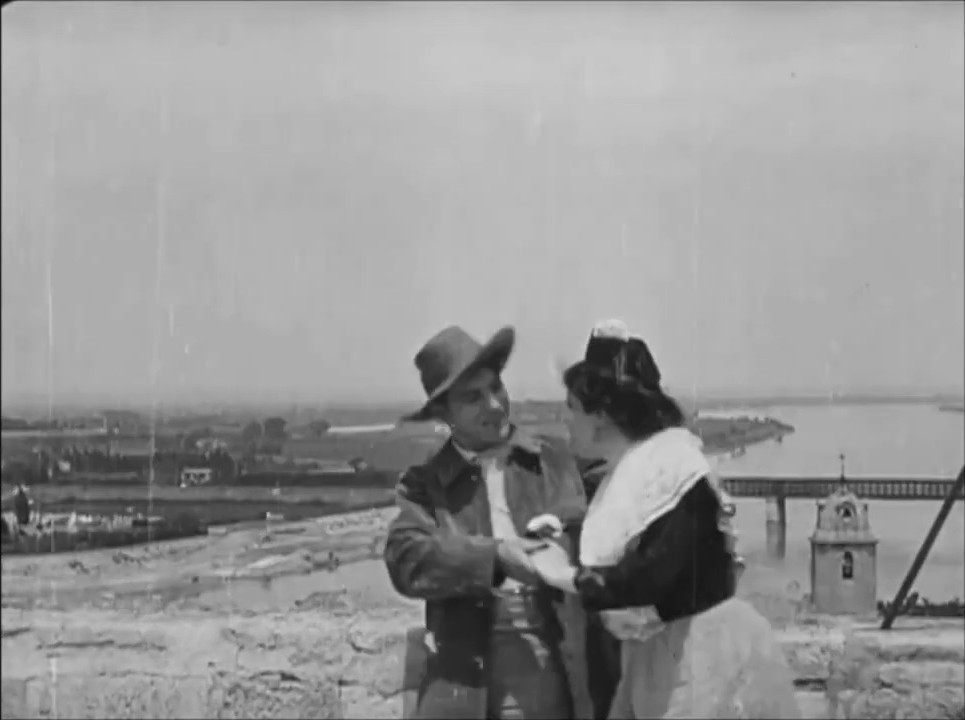
- Paul Capellani & Jeanne Grumbach in L'Arlésienne
- Directed by: Albert Capellani
- Written by: Albert Capellani (adaptation), Albert Capellani (script), and Alphonse Daudet
- Starring: Paul Capellani; Henri Desfontaines; Henry Kraus; Jeanne Grumbach
- Production company: Société Cinématographique des Auteurs et Gens de Lettres
- Distributed by: Pathé
- Release date: 1 October 1908 (France)
- Running time: 18 min
- Country: France
- Language: French

L'Arlésienne (English: The Girl from Arles) is a 1908 French drama film directed by Albert Capellani, based on Alphonse Daudet's eponymous play. It is the first film produced by the Société cinématographique des auteurs et gens de lettres (SCAGL) [fr] (English: Cinematographic Society of Authors and Writers) created at the beginning of the same year to produce cinematographic adaptations of literary classics.

== Plot ==
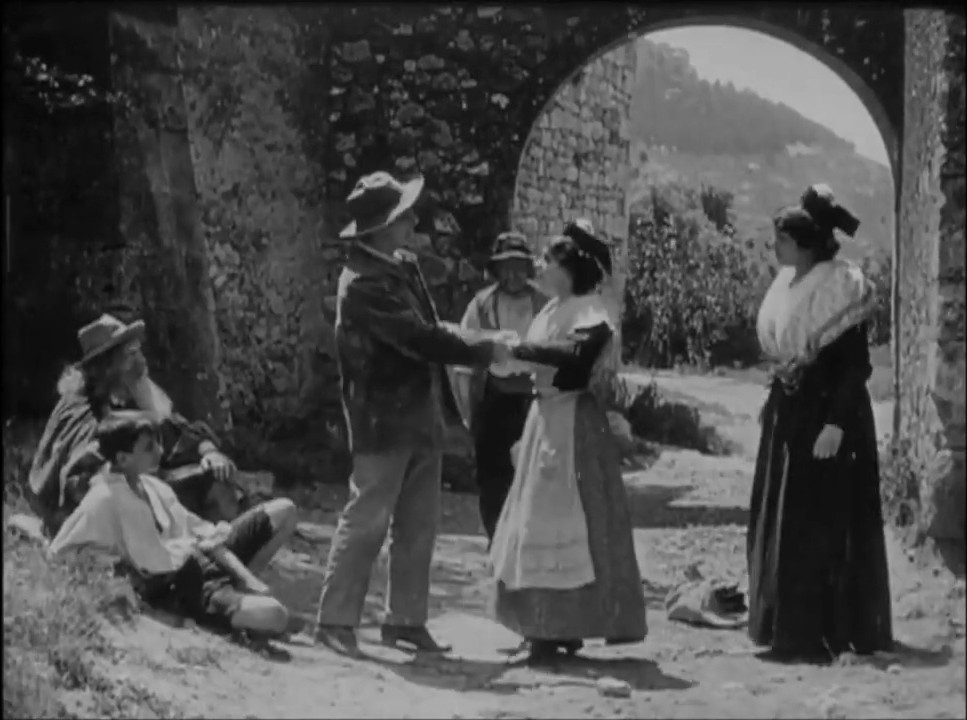

A young man from the country, Frédéric, says good-bye to his family and his sweetheart Yvette in front of his family home and goes to the old city of Arles to attend the bull fight at Roman Amphitheatre. There he meets a beautiful young woman and falls in love with her. They stroll together through the street of the old city and vow eternal love. As he leaves her at her home and walks away, her former lover Mifilio comes along and forcefully complains about her unfaithful behaviour, but she coldly sends him away.

The next day Frédéric meets the girl again and proposes to her and she accepts him. He takes her to his home to introduce her to his parents who welcome her.

A few days before the date planned for the wedding, Milifio appears at Frédéric's house and shows his grandfather Balthazar a letter proving that she had been his mistress and had sworn him eternal love. He shows it to Frederic who confronts the girl. She coldly admits the facts and haughtily leaves the house. Frédéric is devastated.

To prevent him to fall into madness, his mother convinces him to marry Yvette. Frédéric consents and the wedding is celebrated.

But Frédéric cannot forget the Girl from Arles. He keeps having visions of her either alone or with Milifio. Trying to find solace, he climbs to the attic of his house, but there he sees her kissing Milifio in front of the open window. Wanting to catch them, he falls from the window and crashes on the ground. He dies in his mother's arms while Yvette watches, crying.

== Production ==
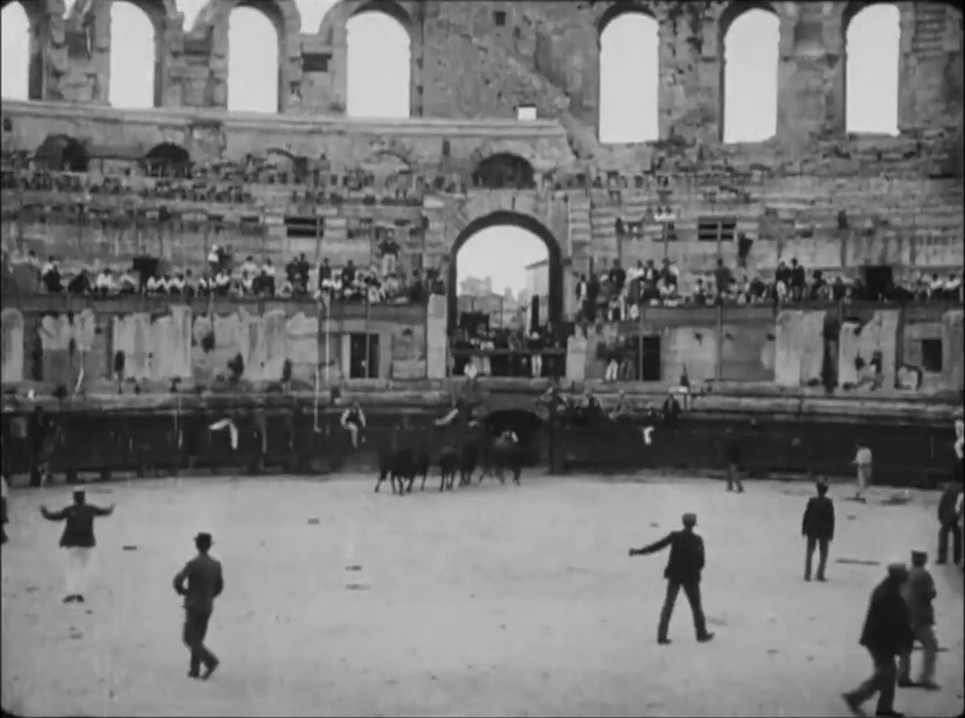

The SCAGL was created at the initiative of Charles Pathé, the founder of the production company Pathé Frères in order to give a new dimension to cinema as the public was beginning to get tired of simplistic comic or melodramatic films. Its object was "The adaptation, composition and cinematographic, photographic and phonographic representation, both in France and abroad, of literary and dramatic works by French or foreign authors, deceased or living (...)". The creation of this company was also a reaction to the creation in February of the same year of a company with a similar objective, Le Film d'Art, and to the ongoing production by that company of its first film, The Assassination of the Duke of Guise.

Albert Capellani was appointed Artistic Director of the SCAGL and in charge of directing L'Arlésienne, the first film to be produced by the new company. The film was almost entirely shot on location in Arles and shows the old streets, the Roman Amphitheatre and the olive groves. It was longer than usual for the time with a length of 355 meter, giving a projection time of about 18 minutes at 18 fps.

The film is composed of 43 shots, showing 27 different points of views, and 10 intertitles which do not replace dialogs but rather introduce the various scenes. Apart from two camera pannings, all the shots are fixed wide shots.

== Release and reception ==
The SCAGL managed to beat Le Film d'Art at the finish line and the première of L'Arlésienne took place in Paris at the Omnia-Pathé theatre on 1 October 1908, one and a half months before the release of The Assassination of the Duke of Guise. The film was presented with the incidental music composed by Georges Bizet for the eponymous play. It was the first time that a score composed by a renowned composer was associated with a film.

According to Phono-Ciné-Gazette, the première of the film in Paris was a resounding success. The film was also a success in London according to an article published in Bioscope which stressed that the fast rhythm of action increased the viewers' interest and that the images of the countryside were like a fairy-tale.

Christine Leteux wrote that L'Arlésienne is a genuine masterpiece. "Capellani shows a remarkable sens of pictorialism in his camera angles and lighting effects. The film even contains an astonishing 180-degree panorama. He uses double exposure with amazing virtuosity. Capellani manages to make us feel Frédéric's torments as he is haunted by the image of the Arlésienne which appears constantly by his side, even in the presence of his bride".

== Preservation ==
The film was considered lost during many decades. It was rediscovered and restored at the beginning of the 21st century and presented in 2011 at the Festival Il Cinema Ritrovato organised by the Cineteca di Bologna. The film is included in the DVD box set Albert Capellani, un cinema di grandeur 1905-1911 published by Il Cinema Ritrovato.

== Selected Cast ==
- Paul Capellani as Frédéric
- Henri Desfontaines as Mitifio
- Henry Kraus as Balthazar
- Jeanne Grumbach as L'Arlésienne
