= The Common Law (1916 film) =

1916 film by Albert Capellani

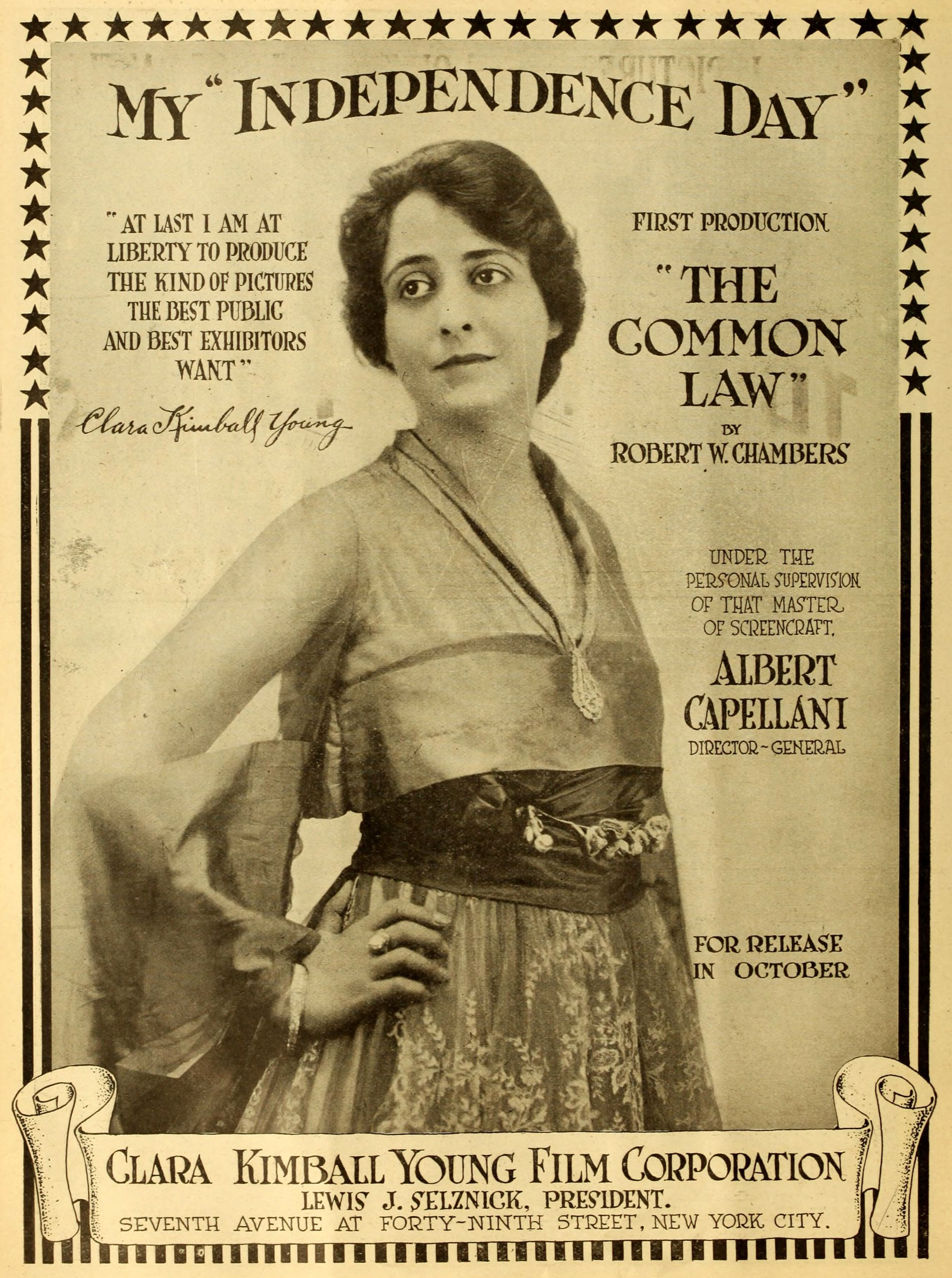
- Advertisement
- Directed by: Albert Capellani
- Written by: Beryl Morhange
- Based on: The Common Law; 1911 novel by Robert W. Chambers
- Produced by: Clara Kimball Young; Lewis J. Selznick
- Starring: Clara Kimball Young; Conway Tearle; Paul Capellani
- Cinematography: Jacques Montéran; Hal Young
- Production company: Clara Kimball Young Film Corporation
- Distributed by: Selznick Distributing Corporation
- Release date: October 15, 1916
- Running time: 7 reels
- Country: United States
- Language: Silent (English intertitles)

The Common Law is a 1916 American silent drama film directed by Albert Capellani and starring Clara Kimball Young, Conway Tearle, and Paul Capellani. It was made at Fort Lee and distributed by the newly formed Selznick Pictures. Shortly afterwards the company switched production to Hollywood.

== Cast ==
- Clara Kimball Young as Valerie West
- Conway Tearle as Neville
- Paul Capellani as Querida
- Edna Hunter as Rita
- Lillian Cook as Stephanie
- Julia Stuart as Mrs. Neville
- Edward Kimball as Mr. Neville
- Lydia Knott as Mrs. West
- D.J. Flanagan as Ogilvy

== Bibliography ==
- Stewart, Jacqueline Najuma. Migrating to the Movies: Cinema and Black Urban Modernity. University of California Press, 2005.
