= Eduardo Belza =

Uruguayan footballer (born 1956)

Personal information
- Full name: Eduardo Belza Franco
- Date of birth: 5 September 1956 (age 70)
- Place of birth: Montevideo, Uruguay
- Height: 1.84 m (6 ft 0 in)
- Position: Goalkeeper

Senior career*
Years	Team	Apps	(Gls)
1980–1981	Atlético Madrid	3	(0)
1981–1984	Atlético B	52	(0)
1984–1985	Cerro Porteño		
1985–1986	Nacional		
1986–1987	Rayo Vallecano	31	(0)
1987–1988	Mallorca	6	(0)
1988–1990	Tenerife	62	(0)
1990–1992	Las Palmas	62	(0)
Total		217	(0)
- * Club domestic league appearances and goals

Eduardo Belza Franco (born 5 September 1956) is a Uruguayan retired professional footballer who played as a goalkeeper.

== Career ==
Born in Montevideo, Belza began his professional career with Spain's Atlético Madrid, playing three La Liga matches in the 1980–81 season. He spent the next three years appearing with their reserves in the Segunda División and, after that, he played the next two campaigns back in South America, for Paraguay's Cerro Porteño and Club Nacional de Football in his homeland.

In 1986, Belza returned to Spain, starting the season at second-tier club Rayo Vallecano and concluding it in the service of RCD Mallorca in the top flight. He was mostly back-up to the Moroccan Zaki in the following campaign, which ended with relegation, and concluded his career with CD Tenerife – playing regularly as they gained promotion to the top division in his first season– and UD Las Palmas, subsequently retiring at the age of 35.

Whilst at the service of Las Palmas, Belza was sent off for the first and only time in his professional career on 5 April 1992, early into an eventual 3–0 second level away loss against Racing de Santander.

== Post-retirement ==
On 3 February 2007, Belza was named as sporting director of the Uruguayan Football Association.
