= Shadows of Paris (1932 film) =

1932 film

- Directed by: Maurice Sollin
- Written by: Maurice Sollin
- Cinematography: Jacques Montéran; Nikolas Roudakoff
- Music by: Ancelli; Keyne
- Release date: 1932
- Running time: 77 minutes
- Country: France
- Language: French

Shadows of Paris (French: Brumes de Paris) is a 1932 French film directed by Maurice Sollin.

== Cast ==
- Colette Andris
- Alexej Bondireff
- Dolly Davis
- Kissa Kouprine
- Jean-François Martial
- Max Maxudian
- Theo Shall

== Bibliography ==
- Crisp, Colin. Genre, Myth and Convention in the French Cinema, 1929-1939. Indiana University Press, 2002.
