= Georges Monca =

French film director

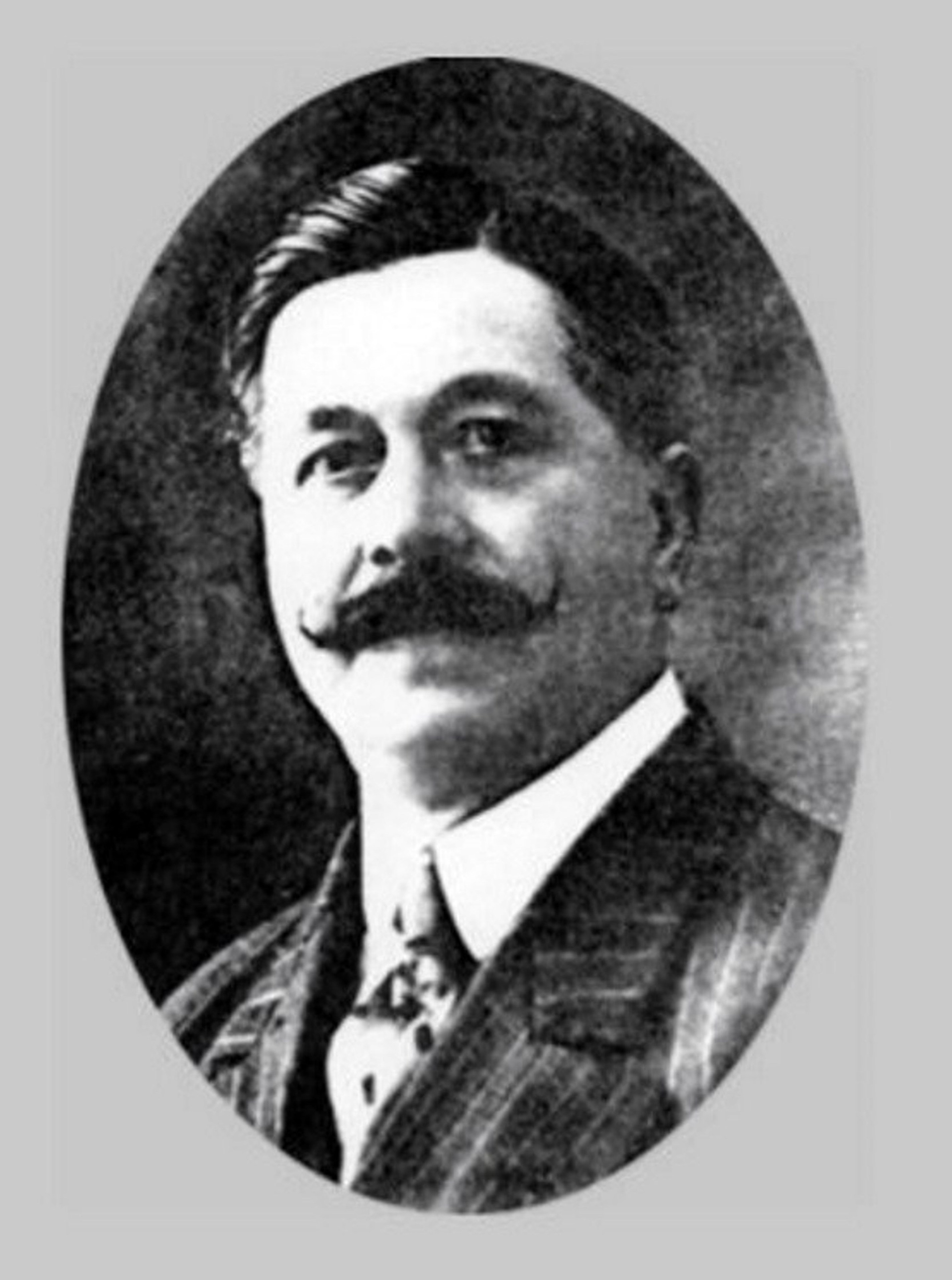
- Monica circa 1920
- Born: Georges Jean-Baptiste Monca; 23 October 1867; Sèvres, Hauts-de-Seine, France
- Died: 26 December 1939 (aged 72); Paris, France
- Occupations: Director, Writer, Actor
- Years active: 1897–1937 (film)

Georges Jean-Baptiste Monca ( 23 October 1867 – 26 December 1939) was a French film director. He was extremely prolific, making nearly four hundred films during his career - mainly during the silent era. His shorts Rigadin Directeur de Cinéma and Rigadin et le Chien de la Baronne were preserved by the Academy Film Archive in 2010.

== Selected filmography ==
- Romain Kalbris (1923)
- Lucile (1927)
- Miss Helyett (1928)
- Billeting Order (1932)
- Wedding Night (1935)
- Three Days Leave (1936)

== Bibliography ==
- Goble, Alan. The Complete Index to Literary Sources in Film. Walter de Gruyter, 1999.
