= Belža =

Municipality of Slovakia

Belža Bölzse
- Municipality
- Flag

- Location of Belža in the Košice Region Location of Belža in Slovakia
- Coordinates: 48.58°N 21.28°E
- Country: Slovakia
- Region: Košice Region
- District: Košice-okolie District
- First mentioned: 1232

Area
  - Total: 5.48 km^{2} (2.12 sq mi)
- Elevation: 177 m (581 ft)

Population (2025)
  - Total: 452
- Time zone: UTC+1 (CET)
  - Summer (DST): UTC+2 (CEST)
- Postal code: 445 8
- Area code: +421 55
- Vehicle registration plate (until 2022): KS
- Website: www.belza.dcom.sk

Belža (Hungarian: Bölzse) is a municipality and village in Slovakia in the Košice-okolie District.

It arose after 1877 by a merge of the municipalities Stredná Belža, Šándorova Belža and Vyšná Belža.

== Geography ==
The municipality lies at an altitude of 177 metres (581 ft) and covers an area of 5.48 km^{2} (2.12 sq mi) (2025).

== Population ==
Population statistic (10 years)
Year	1995	2005	2015	2025
Count	377	359	411	452
Difference		−4.77%	+14.48%	+9.97%

Population statistic
Year	2024	2025
Count	442	452
Difference		+2.26%

It has a population of 452 people (31 December 2025).

=== Ethnicity ===
Census 2021 (1+ %)
Ethnicity	Number	Fraction
Slovak	394	95.86%
Not found out	12	2.91%
Total	411	

In year 2021 was 411 people by ethnicity 394 as Slovak, 12 as Not found out, 2 as Romani, 2 as Hungarian, 1 as Czech, 1 as Russian, 1 as German and 1 as Other.

Note on population: The difference values of population numbers in the table "Population statistic" and in the sections "Ethnicity" & "Religion" is caused by the use of various statistical methods.

=== Religion ===
Census 2021 (1+ %)
Religion	Number	Fraction
Roman Catholic Church	244	59.37%
Greek Catholic Church	102	24.82%
None	36	8.76%
Calvinist Church	13	3.16%
Not found out	12	2.92%
Total	411	

In year 2021 was 411 people by religion 244 from Roman Catholic Church, 102 from Greek Catholic Church, 36 from None, 13 from Calvinist Church, 12 from Not found out, 1 from Jehovah's Witnesses, 1 from Islam, 1 from Evangelical Church and 1 from Baptists Church.

== Genealogical resources ==
The records for genealogical research are available at the state archive "Statny Archiv in Kosice, Slovakia"

- Roman Catholic church records (births/marriages/deaths): 1714-1952 (parish B)
- Greek Catholic church records (births/marriages/deaths): 1791-1896 (parish A)
- Reformated church records (births/marriages/deaths): 1714-1952 (parish B)

== See also ==
- List of municipalities and towns in Slovakia
