= Robert Belza =

Czech weightlifter (1926–1977)

Personal information
- Nationality: Czech
- Born: 9 November 1926
- Died: June 1977

Sport
- Sport: Weightlifting

Robert Belza (9 November 1926 – June 1977) was a Czech weightlifter. He competed in the men's lightweight event at the 1952 Summer Olympics.
