= Paul Capellani =

French actor (1877–1960)

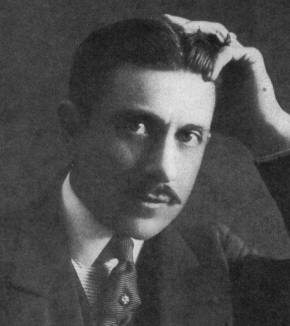
- Capellani in 1914
- Born: 9 September 1877; Paris, France
- Died: 7 November 1960 (aged 83); Cagnes-sur-Mer, France
- Occupation: Actor
- Years active: 1902–1930

Paul Capellani (September 9, 1877 – November 7, 1960) was a noted French silent film actor. His brother was the director Albert Capellani and his nephew the film director Roger Capellani who died May 1940 at the Battle of Dunkirk.

He starred in some 100 films between 1908 and 1930.

In 1920 he appeared in Guy du Fresnay's De la coupe aux lèvres.

== Selected filmography ==
- L'Assommoir (1909)
- The Hunchback of Notre Dame (1911)
- Marie Tudor (1912)
- Roger la Honte (1913)
- Camille (1915)
- The Feast of Life (1916)
- The Foolish Virgin (1916)
- The Common Law (1916)
- La Bohème (1916)
- Possession (1922)
