= Albert Capellani =

French film director

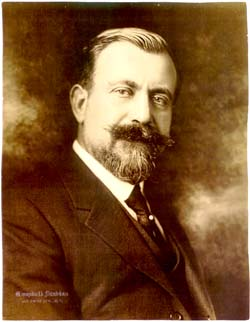
- Capellani c. 1910
- Born: 23 August 1874; Paris, France
- Died: 26 September 1931 (aged 57); Paris, France
- Occupations: Film director, screenwriter
- Years active: 1904–1922

Albert Capellani (23 August 1874 – 26 September 1931) was a French film director and screenwriter of the silent era. He directed films between 1905 and 1922. One of his brothers was the actor-sculptor Paul Capellani, and his son was a film director Roger Capellani.

== Biography ==
Albert Capellani born in Paris in 1874. His father was a banker, and Capellani worked as a bank employee in his early years. Capellani, along with his brother Paul, studied acting under Charles le Bargy at the Conservatoire de Paris. Starting his career as an actor, he worked with the director André Antoine at the Théâtre Libre and the Odéon. He then began directing plays for the Odéon, working alongside the lauded actor and director Firmin Gémier. In 1903, he became the head of the Alhambra music hall in Paris.

He continued to work as an actor and director until he received a job offer from the Pathé Frères studio in 1905. Charles Pathé, who held high hopes for the artistic potential of film as a medium, invited him to join the artistic staff under the direction of Ferdinand Zecca. When Pathé in 1908 launched a "prestige" production unit, the Société des Auteurs et des Gens de Lettres (SCAGL), Capellani became its first artistic director and directed the company's first film, L'Arlésienne. During his Pathé career, he worked as an adviser and supervisor to various directors, including Michel Carré, Georges Denola, Henri Étiévant, and Georges Monca.

He often drew upon his theatrical background to cast stage actor colleagues for his films, such as Henry Krauss, who appeared as Quasimodo in his The Hunchback of Notre Dame (1911) and as Jean Valjean in his Les Misérables (1912). Les Misérables also gave the actress Mistinguett her first important screen role.

His films cover many genres, including melodramas, fairy tales, costume dramas with historical and biblical themes, and literary adaptations, especially after taking up directorship of SCAGL in 1908. Characteristics of his style include a keen sense for staging actors in three-dimensional space, dynamic use of location filming, and an attention to subtle, realistic details that highlight the humanity of his characters.

In 1914 he served in the French army as an officer but was wounded in at the battle of Soissons near Champaigne First Battle of Champagne. He was released from duty but because of the war was unable to direct films in France.

In 1915, he moved to the United States and worked for the film studios Pathé Exchange, Metro Pictures Corporation, the World Film Company, Cosmopolitan Productions, Nazimova Productions, and his own newly created studio, Capellani Productions, Inc. Under his direction, Alla Nazimova rose to prominence as one of the greatest silent film stars in Hollywood.

Capellani returned to France in 1923, where he floated several new film projects but was unable to bring any to fruition. He died of diabetes in 1931.

== Selected filmography ==
- The Bell Ringer's Daughter (1906)
- Aladdin and His Wonder Lamp (1906)
- L'Arlésienne (1908)
- The Hunchback of Notre Dame (1911)
- Marie Tudor (1912)
- De Afwezige (1913)
- Germinal (1913)
- The Face in the Moonlight (1915)
- Camille (1915)
- The Foolish Virgin (1916)
- La Bohème (1916)
- The Common Law (1916)
- The Easiest Way (1917)
- Patrie (1917)
- Daybreak (1918)
- Eye for Eye (1918)
- The House of Mirth (1918)
- Out of the Fog (1919)
- The Red Lantern (1919)
- The Virtuous Model (1919)
- The Parisian Tigress (1919)
- The Love Cheat (1919)
- In Walked Mary (1920)
- Quatre-vingt-treize (1920)
- The Inside of the Cup (1921)
- The Wild Goose (1921)
- Sisters (1922)
- The Young Diana (1922)
