= Ange Du Fresnay =

Spanish noble (1839–1900)

Ange Antoine Guy du Fresnay
- Born: 1839; Sartrouville, France
- Died: 1900 (aged 60–61); Paris, France
- Occupations: Executive knight
- Spouse: Belza Dubreuil

Ange Antoine Guy du Fresnay (French pronunciation: [ɑ̃ʒ ɑ̃twan ɡi dy fʁɛnɛ]; 1839–1900) was a knight of the Order of Carlos III of Spain and director of The Phoenix Companies in France.

He was the son of French writer Maria Du Fresnay, the half-brother of Honoré de Balzac's daughter Marie-Caroline Du Fresnay, and the ancestor of French writer and silent film director Guy du Fresnay as well as of French essayist and economist Philippe du Fresnay.

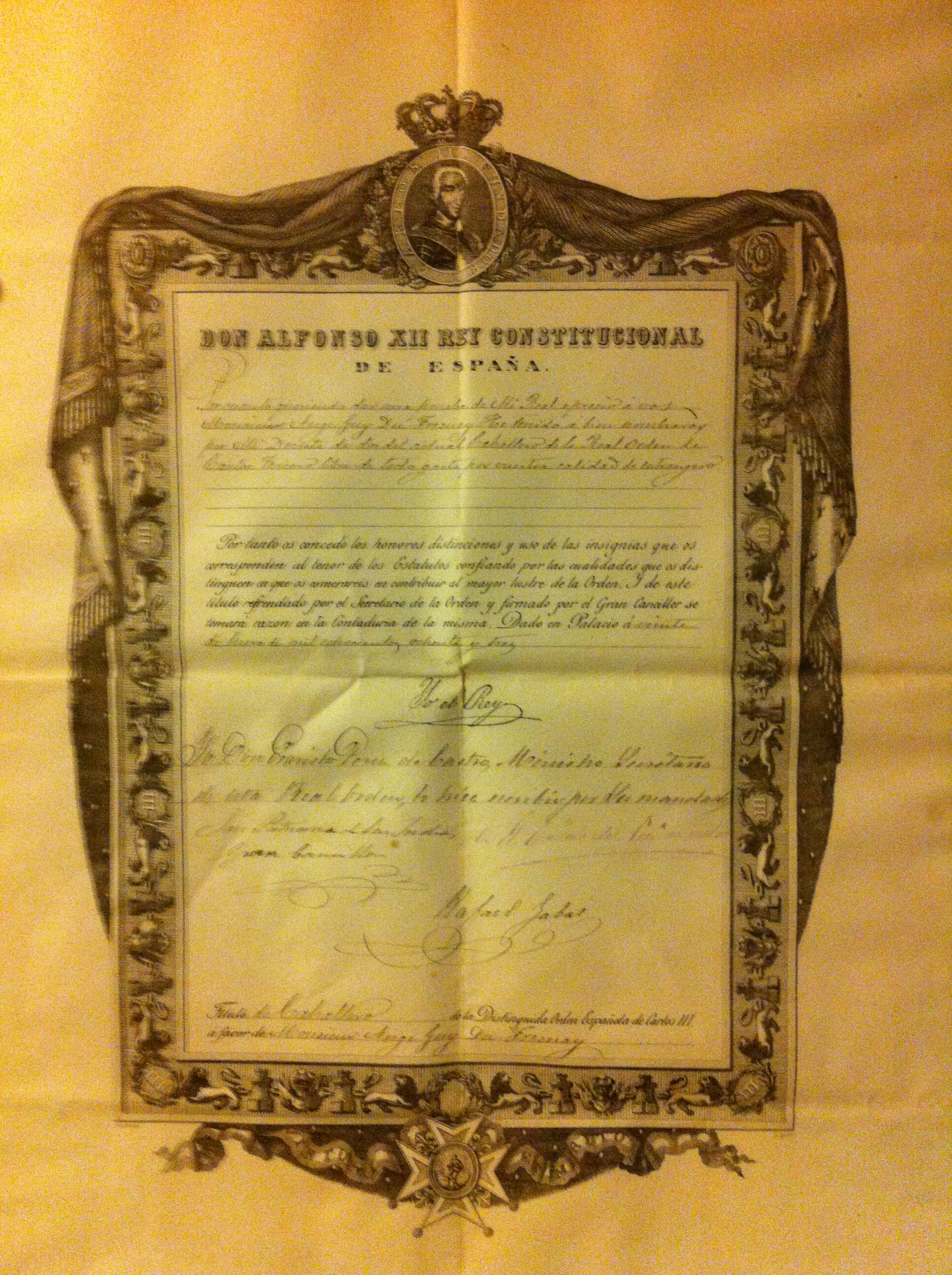
Royal decree granting Ange du Fresnay the title of Knight of the order of Carlos III in 1883

== Biography ==
In 1858, he began working at The Phoenix Companies (now Royal & SunAlliance) in Paris, later becoming their CEO until his death.

In 1877, he bought from Claude Monet his painting Riverbank at Argenteuil, which he sold in 1894.

In 1880, he had the "Villa Belza" built as a gift to his wife Belza, née Dubreuil. Classified in 1997, this is now one of Biarritz's landmarks.

In 1883, Ange du Fresnay was made Knight of the Order of Carlos III by king Alfonso XII of Spain.

== Bibliography ==
- Adam, Antoine (1956), "Marie du Fresnay, fille d'Eugénie Grandet et de Balzac", Les Lettres françaises (in French), pp. 632–648
- Gilbert Guislain, "Balzac", Studyrama, 2004 (page 81)
- Chancerel/Pierrot, "La véritable Eugénie Grandet : Marie du Fresnay", Revue des sciences humaines, 1955 (pages 10–11)
