= West of Shanghai =

1937 American film

- Film poster
- Directed by: John Farrow
- Screenplay by: Crane Wilbur
- Based on: The Bad Man; 1920 play by Porter Emerson Browne
- Produced by: Hal B. Wallis; Jack L. Warner
- Starring: Boris Karloff; Beverly Roberts; Ricardo Cortez; Gordon Oliver
- Cinematography: L. William O'Connell
- Edited by: Frank DeWar
- Music by: Heinz Roemheld
- Distributed by: Warner Bros. Pictures
- Release date: October 30, 1937
- Running time: 64 minutes
- Country: United States
- Language: English

West of Shanghai is a 1937 American adventure film directed by John Farrow and starring Boris Karloff as a Chinese warlord. It is based on the 1920 Porter Emerson Browne play The Bad Man. Three other films, all titled The Bad Man, are also based on the same play:

- in 1923, directed by Edwin Carewe and starring Holbrook Blinn
- in 1930, directed by Clarence Badger and starring Walter Huston
- in 1941, starring Wallace Beery and Ronald Reagan and directed by Richard Thorpe.

== Plot ==
On a train bound for lawless northern China, businessman Gordon Creed encounters acquaintance Myron Galt and his attractive daughter Lola. Galt is on his way to foreclose on a very promising oilfield built up by Jim Hallet. Creed, on the other hand, wants to offer Hallet enough money to pay off his loan from Galt (for a tidy share of the oilfield).

Creed is annoyed when his reserved compartment is appropriated by General Chow Fu-Shan. The general is on his way to deal with self-styled General Wu Yen Fang, a warlord who has taken control of a province. However, Chow Fu-Shan is assassinated on the train by one of Fang's men.

After being questioned by military governor General Ma, the three travel by horse to a remote town, where they find not only Hallet, but Creed's estranged wife Jane, who is working for missionary Dr. Abernathy. Then, Fang's subordinate, Captain Kung Nui and his men take over the town. When Kung Nui casts his eyes on Jane, Hallet impulsively punches him. Jane and Hallet have fallen in love, though she does not believe in divorce and has kept their relationship strictly platonic. Hallet is knocked out and imprisoned.

When Fang arrives, he tries to persuade Jane to go with him, promising she would enjoy it (blithely explaining "I am Fang"). Hallet escapes with the help of an associate disguised as one of Fang's soldiers, and sends him to notify General Ma of Fang's whereabouts. Hallet then breaks in on Fang and Jane's private discussion. Fang remembers Hallet, who once hid a coolie and dug three bullets out of his shoulder; that was Fang before his meteoric rise. The warlord decides to help his benefactor. Fang robs Creed of $50,000, uses it to pay Galt what Hallet owes, then takes the money and offers it to Dr. Abernathy.

Creed bribes Captain Kung Nui to rebel against Fang. Kung Nui wants to regain face by having Hallet executed. Fang pretends to give in, but just before a firing squad shoots the oilman, Fang has his right-hand man, Mr. Cheng, kill Kung Nui. Afterward, Fang personally shoots Creed to fix Hallet's romantic problem, but only manages to wound him.

Government troops arrive and force their way into the town. In the confusion, Jane, accompanied by Hallet, goes to attend to her husband's wound. Creed produces a gun and announces that Hallet is going to have a fatal accident, but is killed by Fang.

With the battle lost, Fang decides to surrender rather than risk the lives of his captives by fighting to the end. He is taken out and executed by firing squad.

== Cast ==
- Boris Karloff as General Wu Yen Fang
- Beverly Roberts as Mrs. Jane Creed
- Ricardo Cortez as Gordon Creed
- Gordon Oliver as Jim Hallet
- Sheila Bromley as Lola Galt
- Douglas Wood as Myron Galt
- Vladimir Sokoloff as General Chow Fu-Shan
- Gordon Hart as Dr. Abernathy
- Richard Loo as Mr. Cheng
- Chester Gan as Captain Kung Nui
- Tetsu Komai as General Ma

== Production ==
This was the second film John Farrow directed for Warner Bros. Pictures.

Karloff was to make Black Widow for Warner Bros. But the studio pushed forward the film in their schedule to take advantage of the Second Sino-Japanese War.

It was known during production as China Bandit, then War Lord, then The Adventures of Fang. Filming took place in February 1937.

Willard Parker was to have made his debut in the film. Karloff's makeup required three hours of work per day; this was less time than was required for his non-human roles.

== Reception ==
The New York Times wrote Karloff "admirably acquits himself as a comedian" in the film which nonetheless had "atmospheric validity" due to "numerous Chinese extras and an imaginative treatment of sets."

== See also ==
- Boris Karloff filmography
