= The Bad Man =

The Bad Man may refer to:

- The Bad Man (play), a 1920 play by Porter Emerson Browne, basis for all three films
- The Bad Man (1923 film), an American silent film drama directed by Edwin Carewe
- The Bad Man (1930 film), an American early sound film starring Walter Huston
- The Bad Man (1941 film), an American film starring Wallace Beery and Ronald Reagan

== See also ==
- A Bad Man, a 1967 novel by Stanley Elkin
- Badman (disambiguation)
- Villain (disambiguation)
