= Monkton Combe =

Village in Somerset, England

Coordinates: 51.357°N 2.327°W

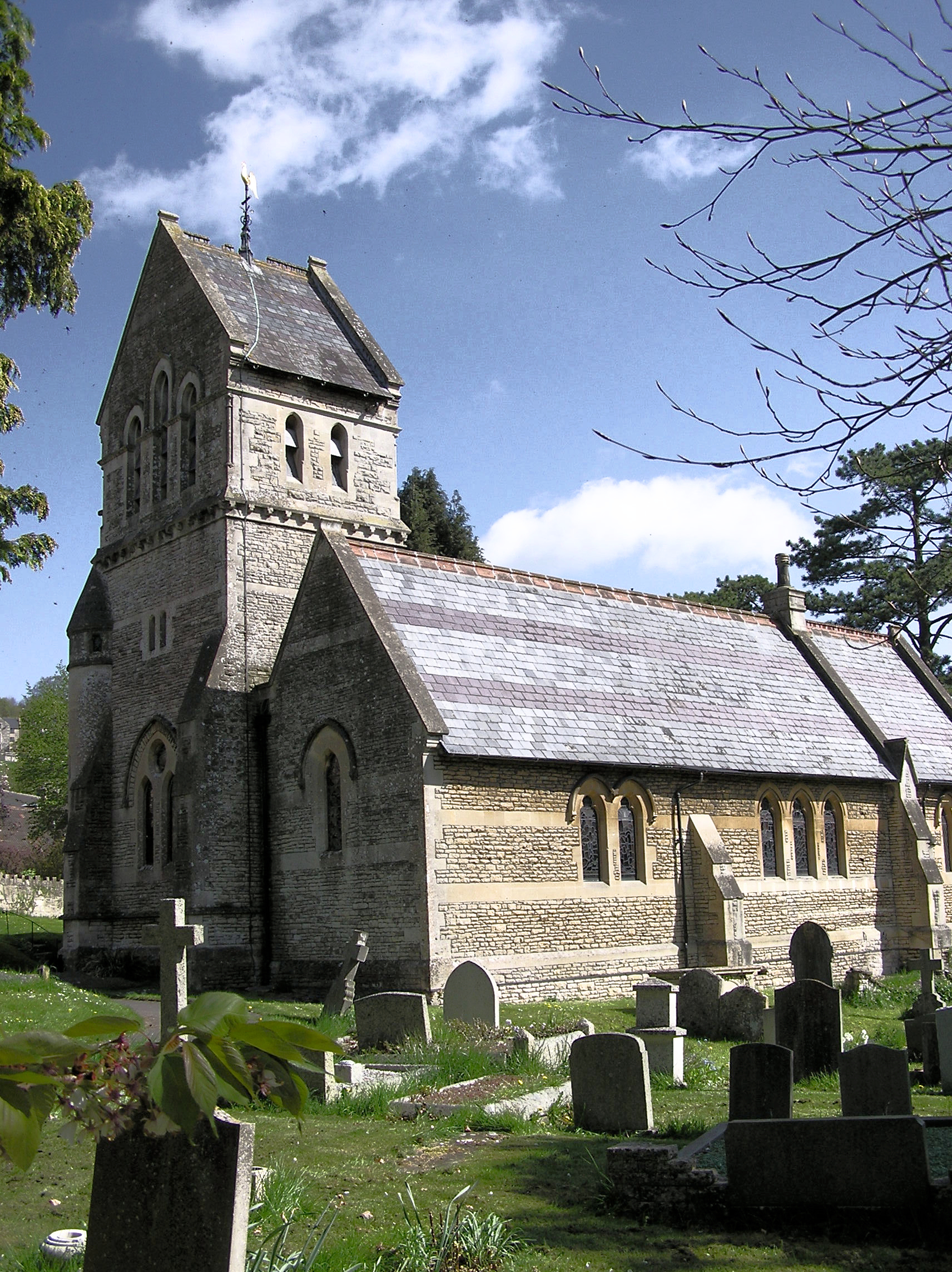
- St Michael's Church

- Location within Somerset
- Population: 554
- OS grid reference: ST771620
- Unitary authority: Bath and North East Somerset
- Ceremonial county: Somerset
- Region: South West
- Country: England
- Sovereign state: United Kingdom
- Post town: BATH
- Postcode district: BA2
- Dialling code: 01225
- Police: Avon and Somerset
- Fire: Avon
- Ambulance: South Western
- UK Parliament: Frome and East Somerset

Monkton Combe is a village and civil parish in north Somerset, England, 3 miles (4.8 km) south of Bath. The parish, which includes the hamlet of Tucking Mill, had a population of 554 in 2013. It was formerly known as Combe, owing to its geography, while it was also known as Monckton Combe and Combe Monckton until last century.

== History ==
The pre-Saxon history of Monkton Combe is poorly recorded. It lay close to the Roman road from Bath to London, which has prompted the construction of a Roman villa in Combe Down. More activity is noted in the sub-Roman period, when it formed the end of the western section of the protective Wansdyke, which had been designed to protect Somerset from Saxon invasion.

Combe was settled and cultivated by the Anglo-Saxon period, when it formed part of the hundred of Bath Forum.

It was probably given to Bath Abbey, along with other surrounding villages, in the early 1060s by either Edward the Confessor or Harold Godwinson. The Abbey had been impoverished, and Bishop Gisa made use of patronage to expand its lands. In 1086, Combe was assessed in the Domesday Book as having around twenty families, and supporting a range of agricultural activities. During the medieval period, it acquired the additional name 'Monkton', noting its ownership by the Abbey and disambiguating it from other nearby 'Combes'.

The village's industry diversified in the late 18th century, with the opening of local mines and the Somerset Coal Canal in 1800. This prompted the expansion of the village's population, and the construction of new housing to accommodate workers, built in the local Bath stone. The canal was converted to a railway in 1910, giving the village a short-lived railway station of its own. The closure of the line encouraged the further de-industrialisation of the village, with the neighbouring flock mill closing the following year, although not before the village, and its station, featured in the popular Ealing comedy The Titfield Thunderbolt.

== Governance ==
The parish council has responsibility for local issues, including setting an annual precept (local rate) to cover the council's operating costs and producing annual accounts for public scrutiny. The parish council evaluates local planning applications and works with the local police, district council officers, and neighbourhood watch groups on matters of crime, security, and traffic. The parish council's role also includes initiating projects for the maintenance and repair of parish facilities, such as the village car park and playgrounds, as well as consulting with the district council on the maintenance, repair, and improvement of highways, drainage, footpaths, public transport, and street cleaning. Conservation matters (including trees and listed buildings) and environmental issues are also of interest to the council. The Village Hall and Village Green are the responsibility of the Village Hall Committee and not of the Parish Council.

The parish falls within the unitary authority of Bath and North East Somerset, which was created in 1996, as established by the Local Government Act 1992. It provides a single tier of local government with responsibility for almost all local government functions within its area, including local planning and building control, local roads, council housing, environmental health, markets and fairs, refuse collection, recycling, cemeteries, crematoria, leisure services, parks, and tourism. It is also responsible for education, social services, libraries, main roads, public transport, Trading Standards, waste disposal, and strategic planning, although fire, police and ambulance services are provided jointly with other authorities through the Avon Fire and Rescue Service, Avon and Somerset Constabulary, and the Great Western Ambulance Service.

Bath and North East Somerset's area covers part of the ceremonial county of Somerset, but it is administered independently of the non-metropolitan county. Its administrative headquarters is in Bath. Between 1 April 1974, and 1 April 1996, it was the Wansdyke district and the City of Bath of the county of Avon. Before 1974 that the parish was part of the Bathavon Rural District.

The parish falls within the 'Bathavon South' electoral ward. The ward starts in the north east at Monkton Combe and stretches south west through Wellow to Shoscombe. The total population of this ward at the 2011 census was 3,052.

The parish is represented in the House of Commons of the Parliament of the United Kingdom as part of the Frome and East Somerset constituency. It elects one Member of Parliament (MP) by the first past the post system of election.

== Church ==
The parish church of St Michael, thought to have been Norman, was razed in the early 19th century and rebuilt in 1814. The 1814 church was soon found to be too small, and was rebuilt in 1865 at the initiative of the first Vicar of Monkton Combe, the Revd. Francis Pocock. It was designed by ecclesiastical architect C. E. Giles of London, and the builder was Mr. S. G. Mitchell. It was extended within just a few years to accommodate the growing number of pupils from nearby Monkton Combe School, founded by Revd. Pocock in 1868. The church is a Grade II listed building.

The churchyard contains the grave of Harry Patch, the last surviving British soldier who served in the First World War, and a handful of Commonwealth War Graves.

== Landmarks ==
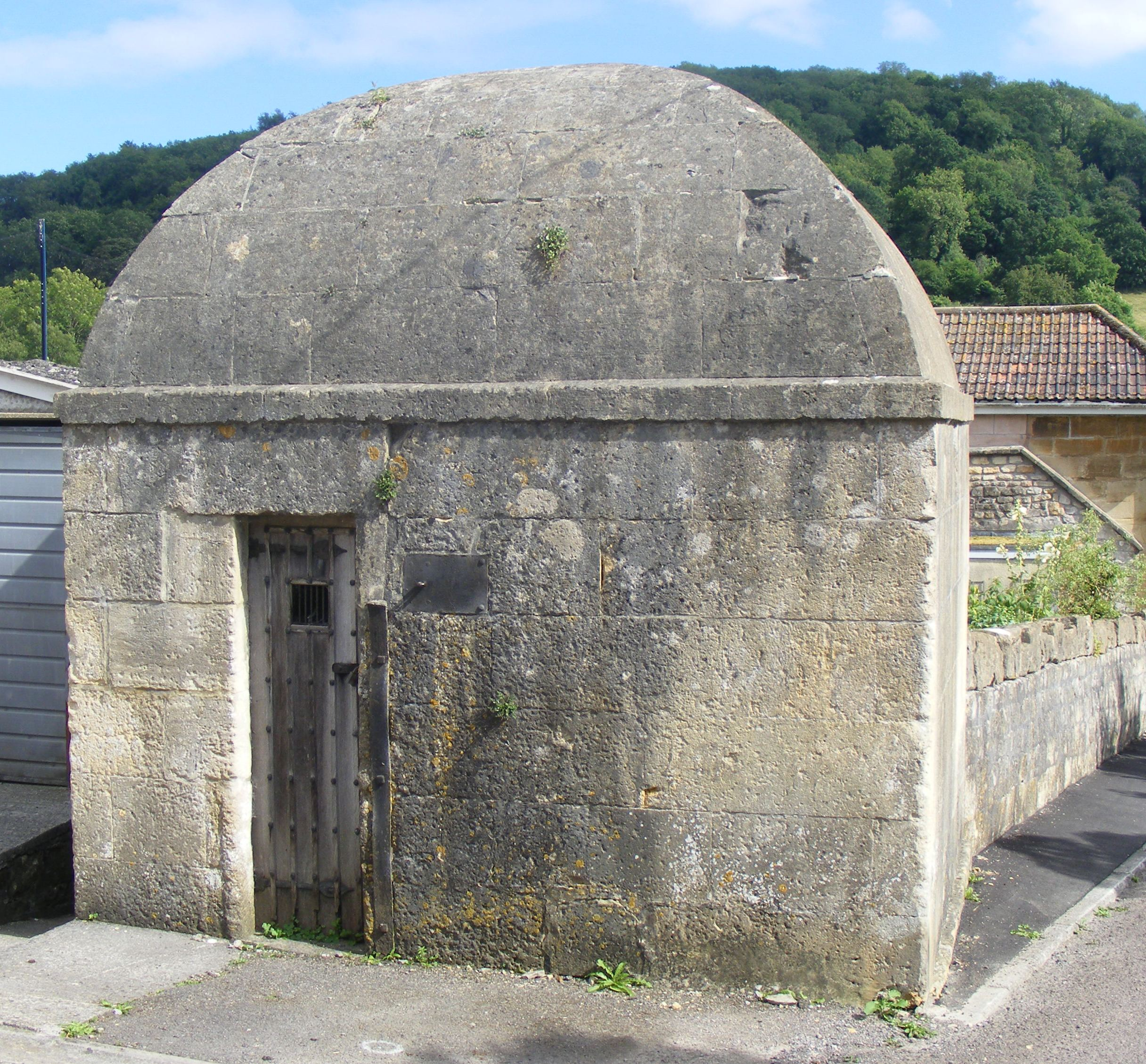
Village lock-up

The village has one public house, the Wheelwright's Arms, which was built as a private house in the mid-late 18th century and later converted to an inn. It gained its name from the wheelwrighting business that worked from its yard until 1934.

A village lock-up in the 18th century, probably circa 1776, and is located conveniently near the Wheelwrights Arms. This is now one of the village's many Grade II listed buildings, and was last used in 1905 by errant pupils to lock up the school's unpopular bursar.

There were two mills from the time of the Domesday Book, which were rebuilt in the early 19th century and have survived to this day, although neither are in working order.

== Monkton Combe School ==
Much of the village and the surrounding fields are owned and occupied by Monkton Combe School, including the majority of the historic houses along Church Lane. Monkton is a prominent public school which was founded in the village in 1868 by the first Vicar of Monkton Combe, the Revd Francis Pocock, and is today a member of the Rugby Group of major British independent schools.

== Gallery ==
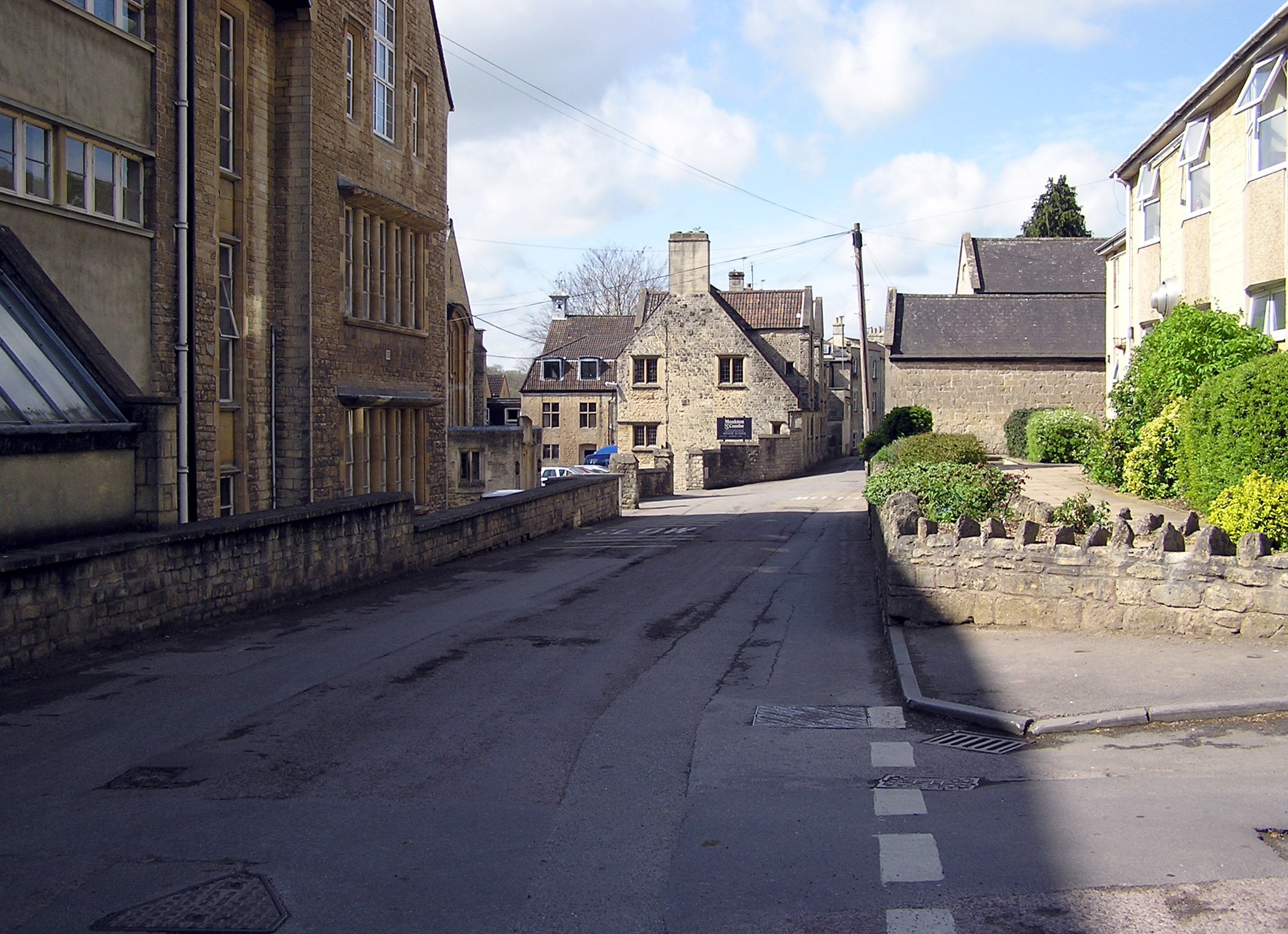
Church Road, with Monkton Combe School on the left

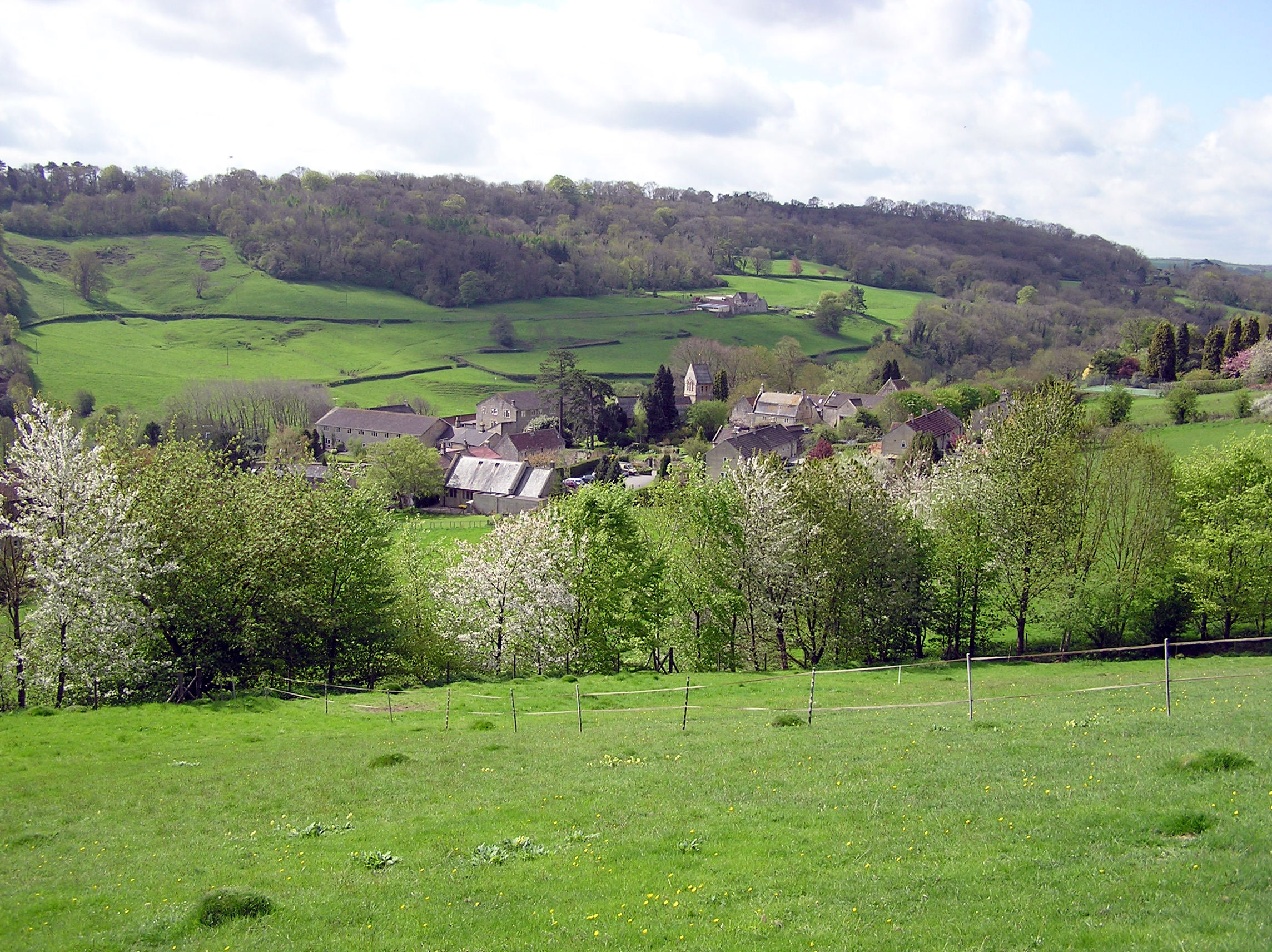
The village, viewed from Brassknocker Hill to the north-east

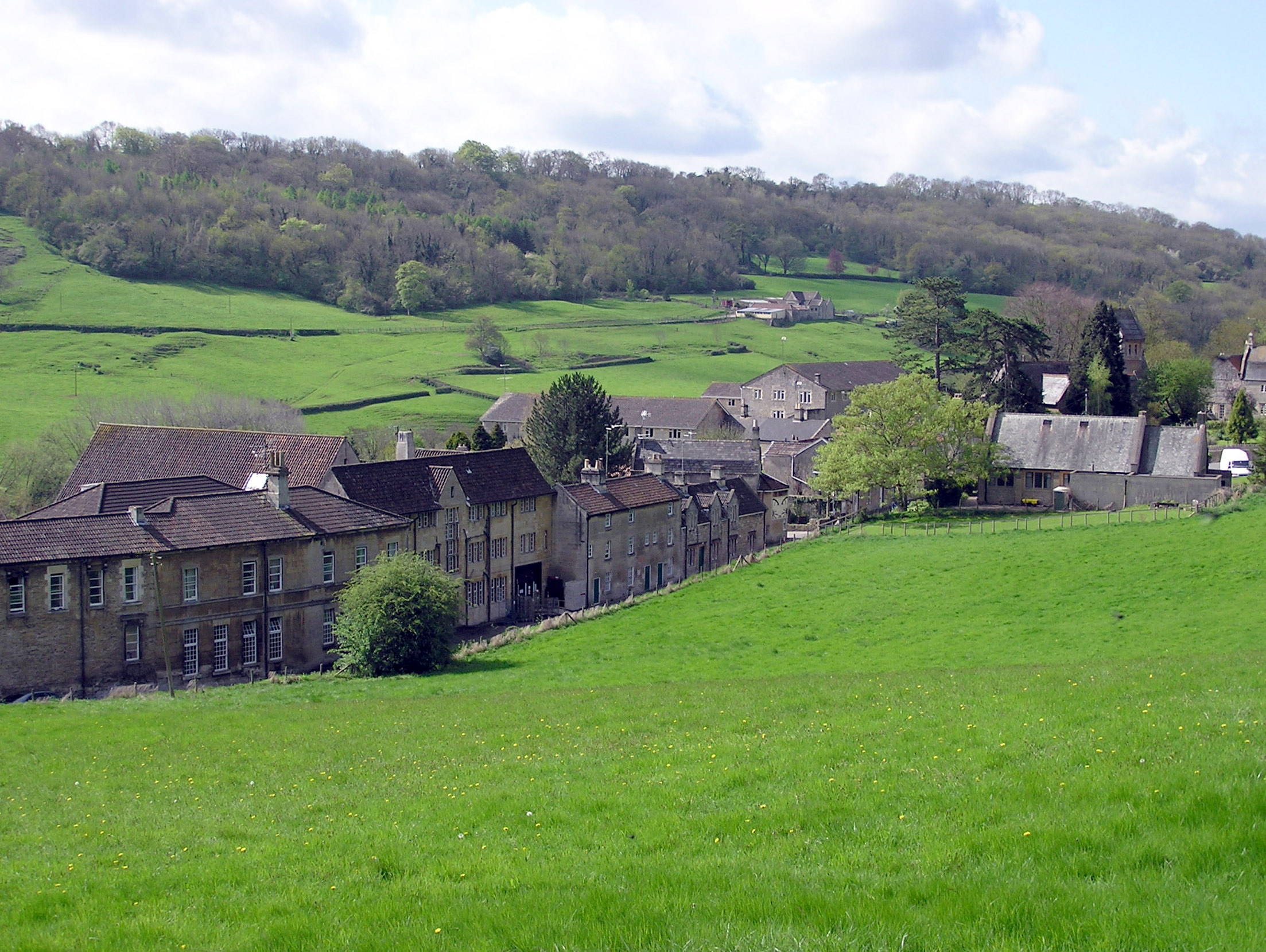
Church Road and the Village hall

== See also ==
- Monkton Combe School
- Monkton Combe Halt railway station
- MV Monkton Combe
