= George Relph =

British actor (1888–1960)

George Relph CBE
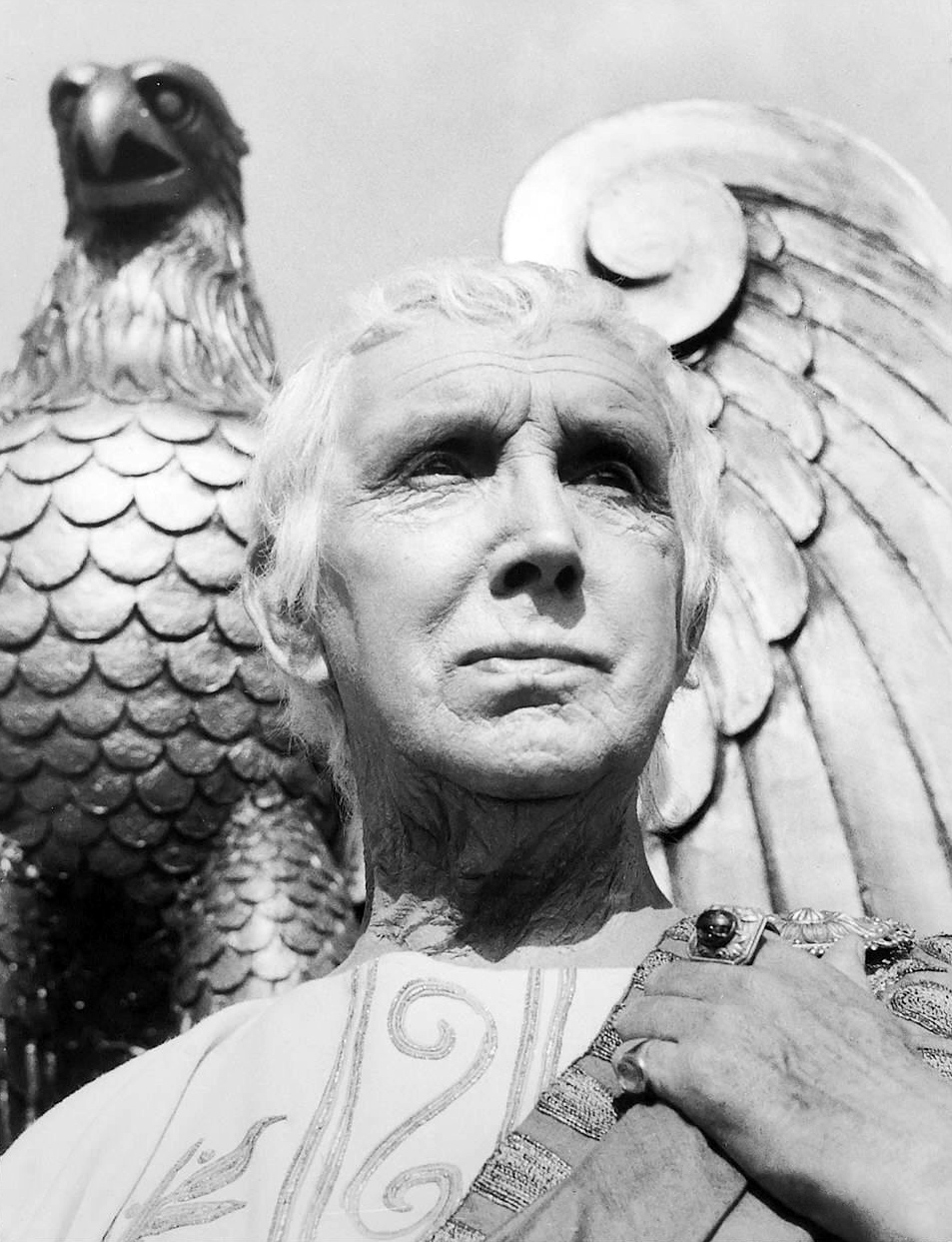
- Relph in Ben-Hur (1959)
- Born: 27 January 1888; Cullercoats, Northumberland, England
- Died: 24 April 1960 (aged 72); London, England
- Occupation: Actor

George Relph (27 January 1888 – 24 April 1960) was an English actor. He acted in more than a dozen films, and also many plays. He served in the British Army in the First World War, and was shot in the leg, hindering his return to acting. But Relph eventually got back on stage, and his career continued. His son, Michael, became a producer in the British film industry. His last role was Tiberius in the 1959 film version of Ben Hur which was released five months before Relph's death.

== Filmography ==
- The Lure of Woman (1915) as Sleeping Wolf a.k.a. John Found
- The Butterfly on the Wheel (1915) as Collingwood
- The Ballet Girl (1916) as Maurice Avery
- Her Maternal Right (1916) as Emory Townsend
- Paying the Price (1916) as Paul Towne
- The Door That Has No Key (1921) as Jack Scorrier
- Candytuft, I Mean Veronica (1921) as George Anstruther
- The Ghoul (1933) as Doctor (uncredited)
- Too Dangerous to Live (1939) as Manners
- Now You're Talking (1940) as Spy
- Give Us the Moon (1944) as Otto
- Nicholas Nickleby (1947) as Mr. Bray
- I Believe in You (1952) as Mr. Dove
- The Titfield Thunderbolt (1953) as Vicar Sam Weech
- The Final Test (1953) as Syd Thompson
- Doctor at Large (1957) as Dr. Farquarson
- Davy (1957) as Uncle Pat
- Ben-Hur (1959) as Tiberius Caesar (final film role)

== Stage work ==
- The Silver King (1902 – 1903, Prince's Theatre, Bristol)
- Kismet (1911-1912, Knickerbocker Theatre, New York) as Kafur
- The Yellow Jacket (1912-1913, Fulton Theatre) as Wu Hoo Git (Young Hero of the Wu Family)
- Romeo and Juliet (1915, 44th Street Theatre, New York) as Romeo (for Herbert Beerbohm Tree)
- The Darling Of The Gods (1913 – 1914, His Majesty’s Theatre)
- Joseph And His Brethren (1913 – 1914, His Majesty’s Theatre) as Joseph (for Beerbohm Tree)
- Fair and Warmer (1918, Prince of Wales Theatre) as Philip Evans
- The Race with the Shadow (1920 – 1921, Royal Court Theatre)
- The Bat (1922, St James's Theatre) as Brooks
- The Way of an Eagle (1922 – 1923, Prince's Theatre, Bristol)
- The Green Goddess (1923 – 1924, St James’s Theatre)
- The Monster (1928, Strand Theatre) as Michael Bruce
- Shall We Join The Ladies? (1929, Palace Theatre) as Mr Gourlay
- Sybarites (1929, Arts Theatre) as Con Delaney
- Almost a Honeymoon (1930 – 1931, Garrick Theatre and Apollo Theatre) as Charles (replacement)
- A Kiss for Cinderella (started 1934, His Majesty’s Theatre ) as Courtier
- The Squeaker (started 1937, Strand Theatre) as Sutton
- The Doctor’s Dilemma (1943, Theatre Royal Haymarket) as Dr Blenkinsop
- Uncle Vanya (1945, Old Vic Company at the New Theatre) as Telegin (Waffles)
- Peer Gynt (1944 – 1945, Old Vic at New Theatre) as Solvieg's Father/ Strange Passenger
- Richard III (1944 – 1945, Old Vic at New Theatre) as George, Duke of Clarence/Cardinal Bouchier
- Henry IV, Part 1 (1945, Old Vic at New Theatre) as Earl of Worcester
- Henry IV, Part 2 (1945-1946, Old Vic at New Theatre ) as Pistol
- Oedipus Rex (1945 – 1946, Old Vic at New Theatre) as Herdsman
- The Critic (1945 – 1946, Old Vic at New Theatre) as Mr Dangle
- Cyrano de Bergerac (1946 – 1947, Old Vic at New Theatre) as Ligniere
- King Lear (1946-1947, Old Vic at New Theatre) as Earl of Gloucester
- The Taming of the Shrew (1947 – 1948, Old Vic at New Theatre) as Grumio
- The School for Scandal (1948 - 1949, Old Vic Company, and Australian Tour) as Sir Oliver Surface
- Antigone (1949, Old Vic at New Theatre) as Creon
- Richard III (1949, Old Vic at New Theatre) as Duke of Buckingham
- Fading Mansion (1949, Duchess Theatre) as Cormack Joyce
- Venus Observed (1950, St James’s Theatre) as Herbert Reedbeck
- The Gioconda Smile (1950, Lyceum Theatre and Fulton Theatre, New York) as Dr Libbard
- Ardèle (1951, Royal Court Theatre, Liverpool) as The General
- The Mortimer Touch (1952, Duke of York's Theatre) as The Duke of Applecross
- The Bad Samaritan (1953, Criterion Theatre & Duchess Theatre) as The Dean
- The Little Glass Clock (1954, Aldwych Theatre) as The Abbe Matignon
- I Capture the Castle (1954, Aldwych Theatre) as James Mortmain
- The Wild Duck (1955, Saville Theatre) as Old Ekdal
- The Seagull (1956, Saville Theatre) as Sorin
- The Entertainer (1957, Royal Court Theatre) as Billy Rice
