= Badman =

Badman or Bad Man may refer to:

== Arts and entertainment ==
=== Fictional characters ===
- A villain, an evil fictional character
- Badman, a CollegeHumor parody of Batman
- Mr Badman, in The Life and Death of Mr Badman, by John Bunyan, 1680
- Badman, in the video game What Did I Do to Deserve This, My Lord?

=== Music ===
- Badman (EP), by B.A.P, 2013, and its title track
- Bad Man (Buc Fifty album), 2002, and its title track
- "Bad Man" (song), by R. Kelly, 2000
- "Badman", a song by Roll Deep from the album Rules and Regulations, 2007
- "Badman", a song by Iyanya from the album Desire, 2013
- "Bad Man", a song by Coheed and Cambria from the album Vaxis – Act II: A Window of the Waking Mind, 2022
- "Bad Man", a song by Disturbed from the album, Divisive, 2022
- "Bad Man", a song by Pitbull from the album Climate Change, 2017
- "Bad Man (Smooth Criminal)", by Polo G, 2021

=== Other uses in arts and entertainment ===
- Diary of a Bad Man, a web TV series
  - Badman (web series)
- Bad Man (2015 film), a South Korean film
- Bad Man (2025 film), a 2025 American action comedy film

== People ==
- George Whiting Badman (1886–1953), South Australian business man, and horse breeder and owner
- Oliver Badman (1885–1977), Australian politician
- Robert Badman (fl. 1908), British Olympic fencer

== Other uses ==
- Badman, a gunfighter
- Badman Review, into English home education, 2009
- Bad Man, a book by Indian journalist Roshmila Bhattacharya

== See also ==
- The Bad Man (disambiguation)
- Villain (disambiguation)
