= The Empress (film) =

- Directed by: Alice Guy
- Written by: Frederick Chapin; Alice Guy; Holbrook Blinn
- Starring: Doris Kenyon; Holbrook Blinn; William A. Morse
- Cinematography: John G. Haas
- Production companies: Popular Plays and Players; U.S. Amusement Corporation
- Distributed by: Pathé Exchange
- Release date: March 11, 1917
- Country: United States
- Languages: Silent; English intertitles

The Empress is a 1917 American silent drama film directed by Alice Guy and starring Doris Kenyon, Holbrook Blinn and William A. Morse.

== Plot ==
The Empress (1917)

== Cast ==
- Doris Kenyon as Nedra
- Holbrook Blinn as Eric
- William A. Morse as DeBaudry
- Lyn Donelson as The Woman in the Dark

== Bibliography ==
- Connelly, Robert (1998). The silents : silent feature films, 1910-36, Volume 40, Issue 2. Highland Park, Ill: December Press. ISBN 9780913204368. OCLC 40494467.
