= The Titfield Thunderbolt =

1953 British comedy film by Charles Crichton

- Theatrical release poster with artwork by Edward Bawden
- Directed by: Charles Crichton
- Written by: T.E.B. Clarke
- Produced by: Michael Truman
- Starring: Stanley Holloway; George Relph; Naunton Wayne; John Gregson; Hugh Griffith; Gabrielle Brune; Sid James
- Cinematography: Douglas Slocombe
- Edited by: Seth Holt
- Music by: Georges Auric
- Color process: Technicolor
- Production companies: Ealing Studios; Michael Balcon Productions
- Distributed by: General Film Distributors
- Release dates: 5 March 1953 (Gala premiere); 6 March 1953 (London)
- Running time: 84 minutes
- Country: United Kingdom
- Language: English

The Titfield Thunderbolt is a 1953 British comedy film directed by Charles Crichton and starring Stanley Holloway, Naunton Wayne, George Relph and John Gregson. The screenplay concerns a group of villagers trying to keep their branch line operating after British Railways decided to close it. The film was written by T. E. B. Clarke and was inspired by the restoration of the narrow gauge Talyllyn Railway in Wales, the world's first heritage railway run by volunteers. "Titfield" is an amalgamation of the names Titsey and Limpsfield, two villages in Surrey near Clarke's home at Oxted.

Michael Truman was the producer. The film was produced by Ealing Studios and was the first of its comedies shot in Technicolor.

There was considerable inspiration from the book Railway Adventure by established railway book author L. T. C. Rolt, published in 1953. Rolt had acted as honorary manager for the volunteer enthusiasts running the Talyllyn Railway for the two years 1951–52. According to British rail enthusiast and film historian John Huntley's book Railways in the Cinema (published by Ian Allan in 1969), T. E. B. Clarke actually visited the Talyllyn Railway in 1951 and spent two days learning about the tribulations faced by its volunteers. A number of scenes in the film, such as the emergency resupply of water to the locomotive by buckets from an adjacent stream and passengers being asked to assist in pushing the carriages, were taken from incidents on the Talyllyn Railway recounted in Railway Adventure.

== Plot ==
The residents of the village of Titfield are shocked to learn that their railway branch line to the town of Mallingford is to be closed. Sam Weech, the local vicar and a railway enthusiast, and Gordon Chesterford, the village squire, decide to take over the line by setting up a company through a light railway order. On securing financial backing from Walter Valentine, a wealthy man with a fondness for social drinking, the men learn that the Ministry of Transport will allow them a month's trial period, after which they must pass an inspection to make the order permanent. Weech is helped by Chesterford and retired platelayer Dan Taylor to run the train and by volunteers from the village to operate the station.

Bus operators Alec Pearce and Vernon Crump, who bitterly oppose the idea and wish to set up a bus line between Titfield and Mallingford, attempt to sabotage the plans. Aided by Harry Hawkins, a steam roller operator who hates the railway, Crump and Pearce attempt to block the line on its first run, but the train forces its way through. The next day, they sabotage the line's water tower but they are thwarted by Weech and the line's supportive passengers. After Chesterford refuses to accept a merger offer from them, Crump and Pearce hire Hawkins to help them derail the steam locomotive and the passenger coach lent to the villagers by British Railways, the night before the line's inspection. Blakeworth, the town clerk of Mallingford, is mistakenly arrested despite trying to stop the attempt, and the villagers become disheartened, believing that their line will now close without any rolling stock or working steam locomotive.

Mr. Valentine visits Taylor, who suggests that they borrow a locomotive from Mallingford's rail yards. Despite being both drunk, they manage to acquire one, but accidentally crash it after they're spotted taking it. Both men are promptly arrested by the police as a result. Meanwhile, Weech is inspired by a picture of the line's first locomotive, the Thunderbolt, which is now housed in the Mallingford Town Hall museum. Upon securing Mr. Blakeworth's release, he helps them to acquire the locomotive for the Titfield branch line. To complete their new train, the villagers use Dan Taylor's home, an old railway carriage body, hastily strapped to a flat wagon. In the morning, Pearce and Crump drive to the village to prepare to take passengers, but are shocked to see the train waiting at the station. Distracted from his driving, Pearce crashes the bus into the police van transporting Valentine and Taylor, and when Crump lets slip that they have been involved in sabotaging the line they are promptly arrested.

With Taylor arrested, Weech takes help from Ollie Matthews, a fellow railway devotee and the Bishop of Wilchester, in running the Thunderbolt for the inspection run. The train departs Titfield late because the police demand transport to Mallingford for them and the arrested men. Despite a mishap with the coupling, the villagers help the train complete its run to Mallingford. Upon arriving, Weech learns that the line passed every requirement for the Light Railway Order, but barely. In fact, had they been any faster, their application would have been rejected.

== Cast ==
- Stanley Holloway as Walter Valentine
- George Relph as Vicar Sam Weech
- Naunton Wayne as George Blakeworth
- John Gregson as Squire Gordon Chesterford
- Godfrey Tearle as Ollie Matthews, the Bishop of Welchester
- Hugh Griffith as Dan Taylor
- Gabrielle Brune as Joan Hampton
- Sidney James as Harry Hawkins
- Reginald Beckwith as Coggett
- Edie Martin as Emily
- Michael Trubshawe as Ruddock
- Jack MacGowran as Vernon Crump
- Ewan Roberts as Alec Pearce
- Herbert C. Walton as Seth
- John Rudling as Clegg
- Nancy O'Neil as Mrs Blakeworth
- Campbell Singer as Police Sergeant
- Frank Atkinson as Station Sergeant
- Wensley Pithey as Policeman

Engine Driver Ted Burbidge, fireman Frank Green and the guard Harold Alford were not actors, but British Railways employees from the Westbury depot, located on the former-Great Western Railway main line from London to Bristol. Originally they were provided only to operate the locomotives employed in the film on location, but when Charles Crichton talked to them and realised they "looked and sounded the part", they were given speaking roles and duly credited.

When interviewed for an article in the Railway World, T.E.B. Clarke revealed that he based Mr. Valentine on an elderly gentleman that he remembered in the hotel bar while on a holiday.

== Production ==
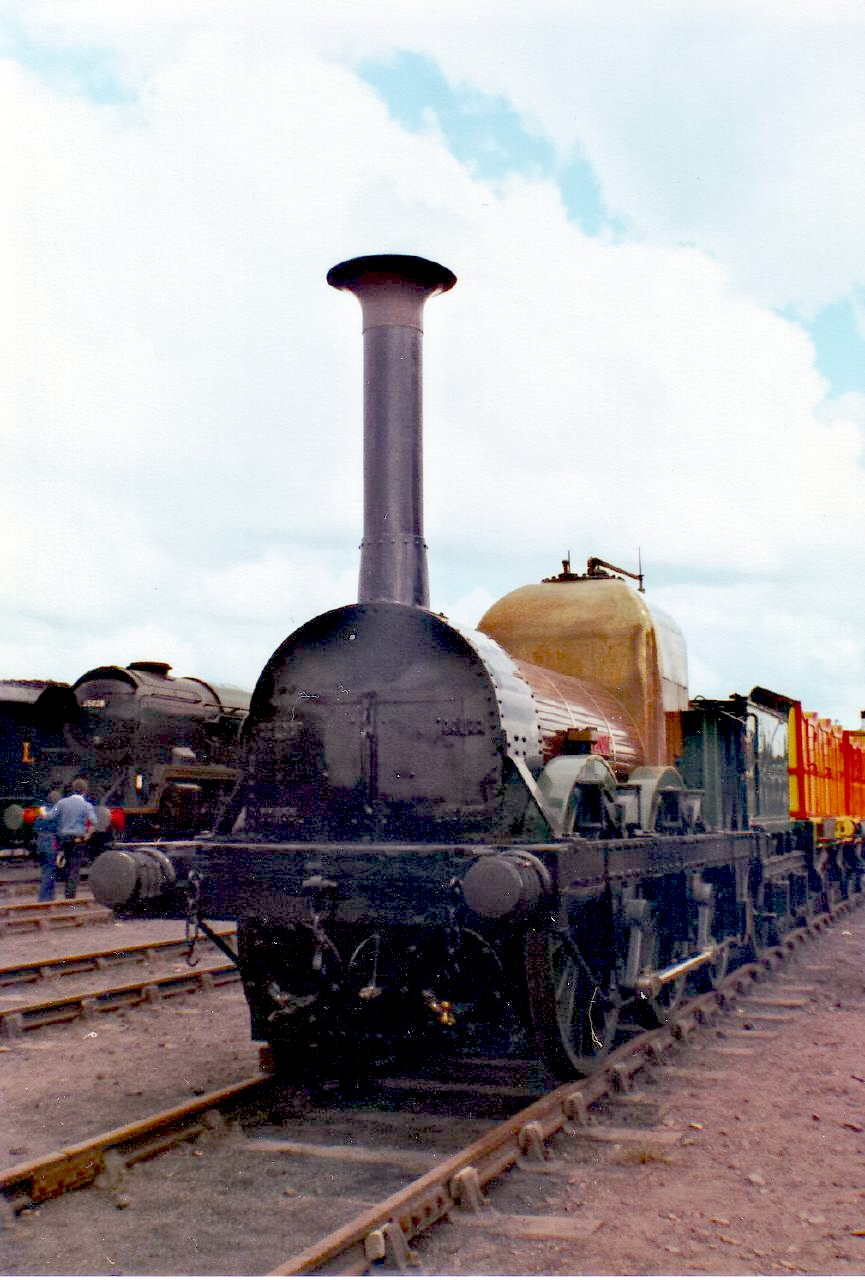
Lion (seen here in May 1980) masqueraded as Thunderbolt for the film.

As related in an article focused on the production published in the March 1953 edition of The Railway Magazine, the script requirements called for several weeks' filming (in 1952) on a suitable single-track railway line passing through attractive scenery, complete with a main line junction, a level crossing, and a pleasant branch line terminus station. Assistance was provided by the Railway Executive in charge of British Railways, and a number of branch lines were examined in pre-production, including the Kelvedon and Tollesbury Light Railway, the Mid-Suffolk Light Railway, the Kent & East Sussex Railway and the Lambourn Valley Railway.

Shooting was largely carried out near Bath, Somerset, on the Camerton branch of the Bristol and North Somerset Railway, along the Cam Brook valley between Camerton and Limpley Stoke. The branch had closed to all traffic on 15 February 1951, but was reopened for filming. Titfield railway station was in reality Monkton Combe railway station, whilst Titfield village was nearby Freshford, with other scenes being shot at the disused Dunkerton Colliery. Mallingford railway station in the closing scene was Bristol Temple Meads railway station. The opening scene shows Midford Viaduct on the Somerset and Dorset Joint Railway, where the branch line passed underneath. The scene of the Squire attempting to overtake Harry Hawkins' steam roller was filmed in Carlingcott.

The scene where a replacement locomotive is 'stolen' used a wooden mock-up 'locomotive' mounted on a lorry chassis: the rubber tyres can (just) be spotted between the locomotive's driving wheels. The scene was jointly filmed in the Oxfordshire market town of Woodstock and in Richmond Park, London, but the lead-in scene with the turntable was filmed at Oxford locomotive depot with a real engine. The earlier scene of GWR 1400 Class No. 1401 crashing and getting wrecked as it heads down an embankment used realistic scale models filmed on a set at Ealing Studios.

The Thunderbolt itself was represented by an actual antique museum resident, the Liverpool and Manchester Railway locomotive Lion, built in 1838 and so at the time 114 years old. It was repainted in a colourful red and green livery to suit the Technicolor process and ran under its own power in the film. In the scene in which the Thunderbolt is "rear-ended" by the uncoupled train, the locomotive's tender sustained some actual damage, which remains visible beneath the buffer beam to this day. The scene where Thunderbolt is removed at night from its museum was filmed in the (now demolished) Imperial Institute building near the Royal Albert Hall in London, but shots were created using a studio-built model for this.

== Release ==
The film had its gala premiere at Leicester Square Theatre in London on 5 March 1953, as part of the British Film Academy's award ceremony, before going on general release from the 6th. The poster was commissioned by Ealing Studios from the artist Edward Bawden and features the final episode in which the Bishop of Wilchester acts as fireman on the purloined Victorian locomotive.

== Critical reception ==
Ealing Studios head Sir Michael Balcon expressed dissatisfaction with the result of the film, believing that it didn't quite match up to what had been written in the script. Others too at the same time thought that it fell short in comparison to other Ealing comedies. The British Film Institute's Monthly Film Bulletin for April 1953, for example, considered the script "disconcertingly short on wit, and some of its invention seems forced." The acting, however, was praised by Variety.

Decades later, it is remembered that though the film was "One of the less popular Ealing Comedies at the same time, it is now regarded as more of a classic". Similarly, Ivan Butler in his Cinema in Britain called it "A minor Ealing, perhaps even a little tired towards the evening of their long comedy day, but a very pleasant sunset for all that." George Perry, in his history of the studios, compared it to Whisky Galore and Passport to Pimlico as sharing "the theme of the small group pitted against and universally triumphing over the superior odds of a more powerful opponent." But, quoting a location report by Hugh Samson of Picturegoer, he suggests there was a lack of sympathy for the subject: "Odd point about this railway location: not a single railway enthusiast to be found in the whole crew. T.E.B. Clarke, writer of the script, loathes trains. Producer Michael Truman can't get out of them fast enough. And director Crichton – well, you wouldn't find him taking engine numbers at Paddington Station." Again, Charles Barr concurred that "there is no grasp of a living community, or of the relevance of the train to people's daily needs."

== Home media ==
The Titfield Thunderbolt is available on Blu-ray disc with numerous disc extras from Film Movement's reissue label Film Movement Classics.

== Stage adaptation ==
Performances of Philip Goulding's adaptation of the story for theatre began in 1997 and have continued regularly since, largely in a series of local productions. A first national tour took place in 2005, and the script was published in 2008 as The Titfield Thunderbolt: A Play (Samuel French Ltd).

== See also ==
- Railway with a Heart of Gold – a short documentary film described as "the reality behind The Titfield Thunderbolt."
