= The Door That Has No Key =

1921 British film by Frank Hall Crane

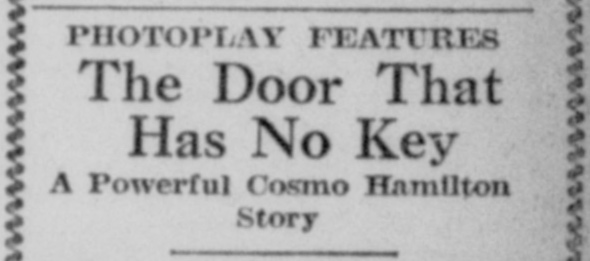
- Contemporary newspaper advertisement
- Directed by: Frank Hall Crane
- Written by: Cosmo Hamilton
- Starring: George Relph
- Release date: 22 February 1921
- Running time: Five reels
- Country: United Kingdom
- Language: Silent

The Door That Has No Key is a 1921 silent British drama film directed by Frank Hall Crane. The film is considered to be lost.

== Cast ==
- George Relph as Jack Scorrier
- Betty Faire as Margaret Hubbard
- Evelyn Brent as Violet Melton
- Wilfred Seagram as Pat Mulley
- Olive Sloane as Blossy Waveney
- W. Cronin Wilson as Yearsley Marrow
- Alice De Winton as Lady Emily Scorrier
- A. Harding Steerman as Honorable Claude Scorrier
- Gordon Craig as Clive
