= Monkton Combe Halt railway station =

Former railway station in England

Monkton Combe Halt
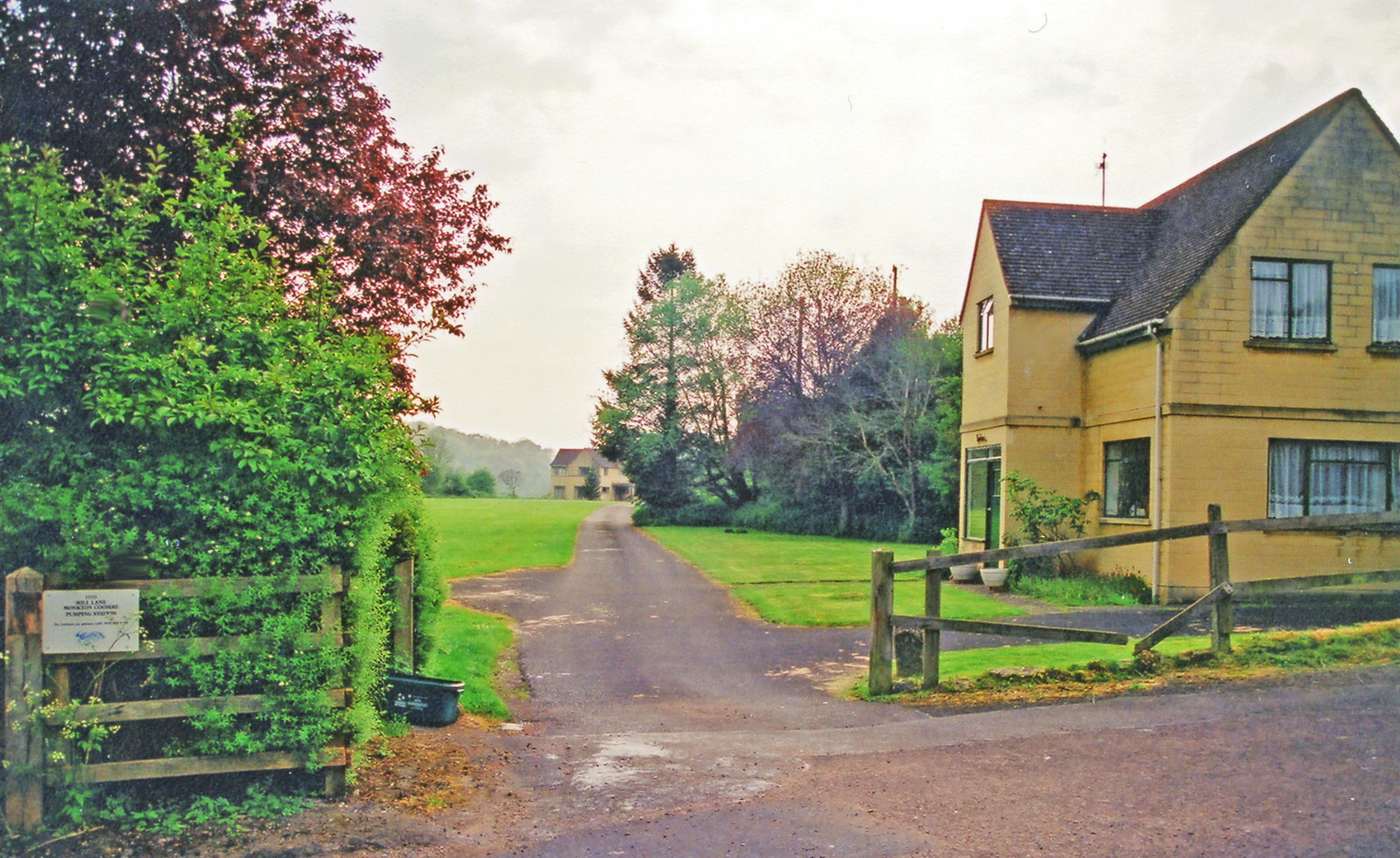
- Site of the station in 2001

General information
- Location: Monkton Combe, Bath and North East Somerset; England
- Coordinates: 51.35595°N 2.32595°W
- Grid reference: ST774619
- Platforms: 1

Other information
- Status: Disused

History
- Original company: Great Western Railway
- Pre-grouping: Great Western Railway
- Post-grouping: Great Western Railway

Key dates
- 1910: Opened
- 1915: Passenger services suspended
- 1923: Passenger services resumed
- 1925: Closed to passengers
- 15 February 1951: Line closed
Location

Monkton Combe Halt railway station was a railway station in Monkton Combe, Somerset, England. It was opened by the Great Western Railway in 1910 on the Camerton branch of the Bristol and North Somerset Railway line. It closed in 1951 but was used for filming The Titfield Thunderbolt in 1952.

== History ==
A branch had been built in 1882 from Hallatrow on the Bristol Temple Meads to Frome line to a terminus at Camerton. The branch was extended on 9 May 1910 through Monkton Combe to Limpley Stoke on the line from Bath to Bradford-on-Avon.

Passenger services started in 1910 and were suspended during the First World War on 22 March 1915. They resumed on 9 July 1923 but were withdrawn entirely two years later on 21 September 1925.

The goods services between Limpley Stoke and Camerton continued, daily until Camerton colliery, the last working coal mine in the Cam Valley, ended production. The last coal was raised on 14 April 1950 and the train service was curtailed to just once every fortnight but by October this reduced to once each month. The line closed entirely on 15 February 1951. The station was demolished in 1958.

== Description ==
The station had a single platform was on the north side of the line. There was a wooden building that contained all the facilities: ticket office, waiting room and toilets. Opposite the platform was a small goods yard with a loop line alongside the branch track and a single siding which served a small platform with animal pens. Station Road (now called Mill Lane) crossed the line on a level crossing at the west end of the platform and access to the goods yard was from the same road.

The station was run by one man who was also responsible for the level crossing, the signals, and maintaining the gardens.

== Services ==
Passenger services ran five times a day in 1910 using GWR steam rail motors but by 1912 had been reduced to four trains. The journey to Hallatrow took about half an hour, and to Limpley Stoke just 4 minutes. Two goods trains ran in each direction. One shunted wagons into and out of the goods yard but the other just called at the passenger platform with less-than-wagonload traffic carried in a 'station truck'.

After the end of regular passenger services, traffic included coal trains, some goods wagons to Freeman's tweed mill, and a special train, with covered wagons for luggage, delivered or collected the boys from Monkton Combe School at the beginning and end of school terms.

Preceding station	Disused railways	Following station
Midford Halt	Great Western Railway	Limpley Stoke

== Cultural impact ==
The station was used as 'Titfield' station in the Ealing comedy film The Titfield Thunderbolt which was filmed in 1952, a year after the line's closure. The station's canopy was extended and an extra ticket window appeared. Other scenes were filmed nearby including at Camerton colliery and at Limpley Stoke.
