= St Michael's Church, Monkton Combe =

Church in Somerset, England

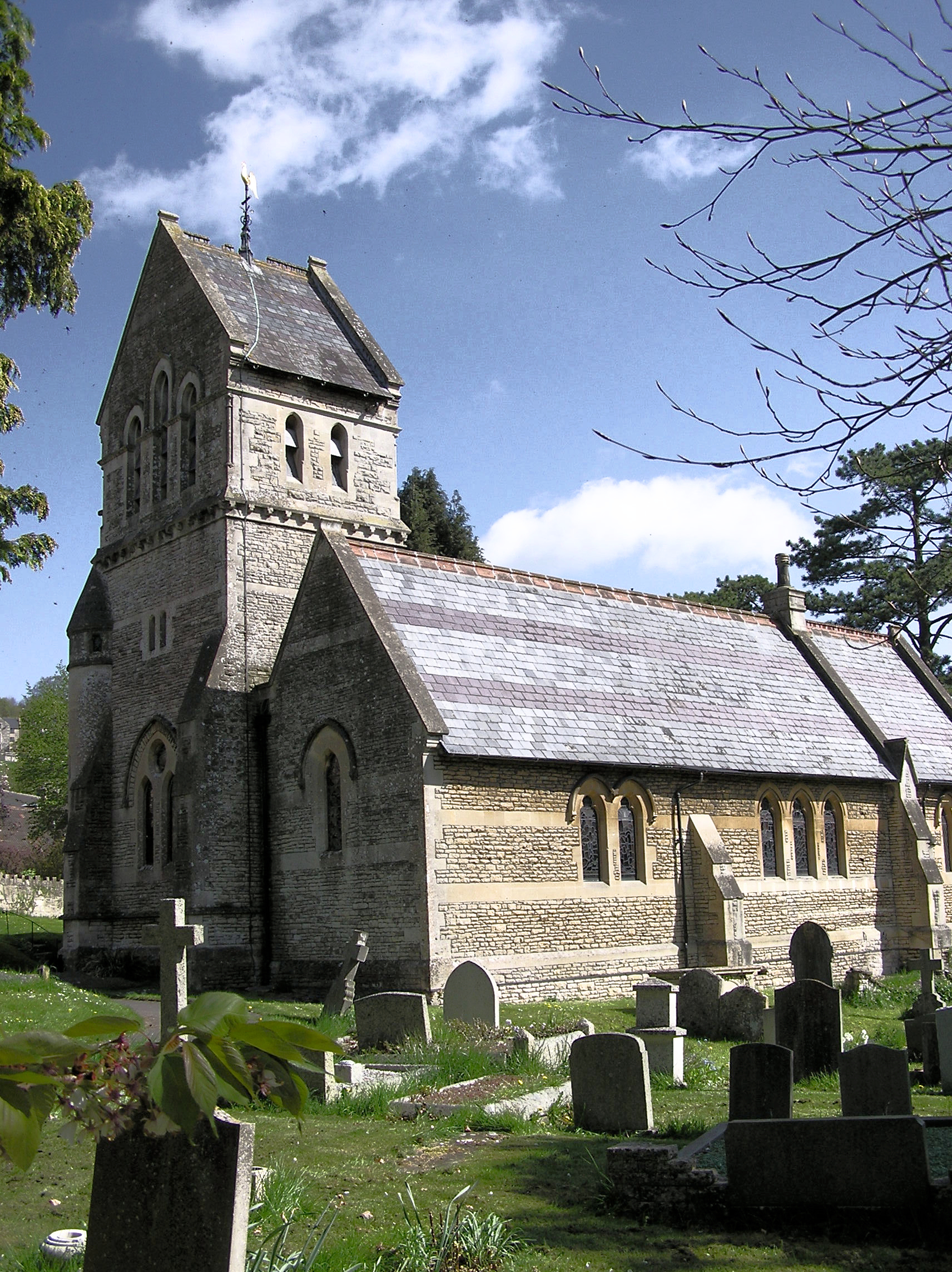
- St Michael's Church, Monkton Combe
- 51°21′22″N 2°19′43″W
- Denomination: Church of England
- Churchmanship: Broad Church

History
- Dedication: St. Michael

Administration
- Province: Canterbury
- Diocese: Bath and Wells
- Parish: Monkton Combe

St Michael's Church is the Church of England parish church of Monkton Combe, Somerset, England. It was also the parish church of Combe Down until the 1850s when the communities separated. It is a Grade II listed building.

== Background ==
The structure is mostly mid-Victorian. Predominantly an example of Early English Gothic Revival, the structure has a steep pitched polychrome Welsh Slate roof and other aspects that clearly mark it from a distance as being a mid 19th-century construction. The main tower is surmounted by a gilded weather cock.

== Norman Church ==
The village was owned by the Bath Abbey monks, hence the name Monkton Combe, and the first structure was considered to be an “ancient Norman” one. The parish minutes of 1757 give a glimpse of the small church structure having a chancel with at least two pews. “The church is a small structure, 50 feet in length and 16 feet in breadth, covered with tiles; at the west end in a little stone turret hangs two small bells. It is dedicated to St. Michael.”

== Regency Church ==
“About the beginning of the 19th century, when this little old church, after long neglect, needed extensive repairs, the inhabitant instead of repairing it, pulled it down and out of its materials build a new church of about the same size, seating only 95 persons, but to their minds no doubt more comfortable. It was erected in 1814 and did not last long. The Rev. Francis Pocock, being appointed vicar of Monkton Combe in 1863, found this church in a dilapidated state, and … for the needs for the parish, and had the courage to undertake the entire rebuilding of the sacred edifice.” Revd Pocock went on to found Monkton Combe School in 1868.

== Bells ==
The tower contains an 8-bell chime which was installed as a memorial to Rev. Francis Pocock, vicar of the parish from 1863 to 1875. It was cast by J. Taylor of Loughborough and dedicated at Easter 1927 by the Lord Bishop of Bath and Wells. There are also two small ancient bells which are survivors from a previous building on this site.

== Organ ==
The church contains a two manual pipe organ by Henry Jones and Sons.

== Churchyard ==
The churchyard contains the grave of Harry Patch, known as the "Last Fighting Tommy" and the last surviving British Army soldier to have fought in World War I. He died aged 111 and was buried there in July 2009, near the graves of several members of his family.

== List of Incumbents ==
Name	Years as Minister
The Revd F. Pocock	1863–1876
The Revd A.G. Gristock	1876–1882
The Revd D.L. Pitcairn	1883–1914
The Revd Sir M.H.P. Beauchamp	1914–1918
The Revd P.E. Warrington	1918–1961

== See also ==
- List of ecclesiastical parishes in the Diocese of Bath and Wells
