= A Butterfly on the Wheel =

1915 film directed by Maurice Tourneur

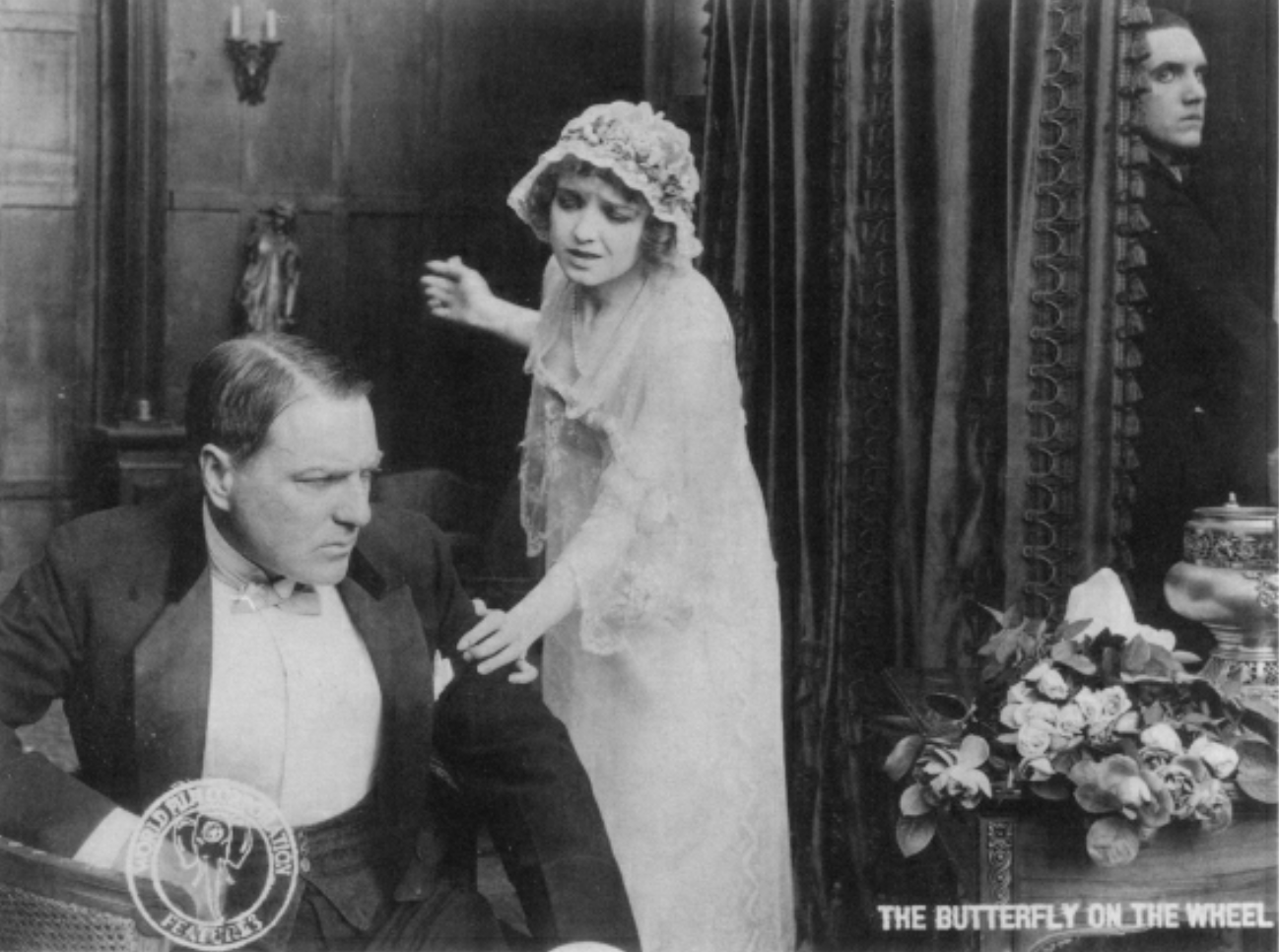
- Holbrook Blinn and Vivian Martin
- Directed by: Maurice Tourneur
- Written by: Edward Hemmerde (play); Francis Neilson (play); E. Magnus Ingleton
- Starring: Holbrook Blinn; Vivian Martin; George Relph
- Cinematography: Lucien N. Andriot; Sol Polito
- Edited by: Clarence Brown
- Production company: Shubert Film Corporation
- Distributed by: World Film Company
- Release date: November 15, 1915
- Running time: 50 minutes
- Country: United States
- Language: Silent (English intertitles)

A Butterfly on the Wheel is a lost 1915 American silent drama film directed by Maurice Tourneur and starring Holbrook Blinn, Vivian Martin and George Relph.

== Cast ==
- Holbrook Blinn as Mr. Admaston
- Vivian Martin as Peggy Admaston
- George Relph as Collingwood
- June Elvidge as Lady Attwill
- Johnny Hines

== Bibliography ==
- American Film Institute (1988). "A Butterfly on the Wheel". In Hanson, Patricia King (ed.). The American Film Institute film catalog of motion pictures produced in the United States : feature films, 1911-1920. University of California Press. p. 114. ISBN 9780520063013.
- Waldman, Harry. Maurice Tourneur: The Life and Films. McFarland, 2001.
