= Joan of Plattsburg =

1918 film

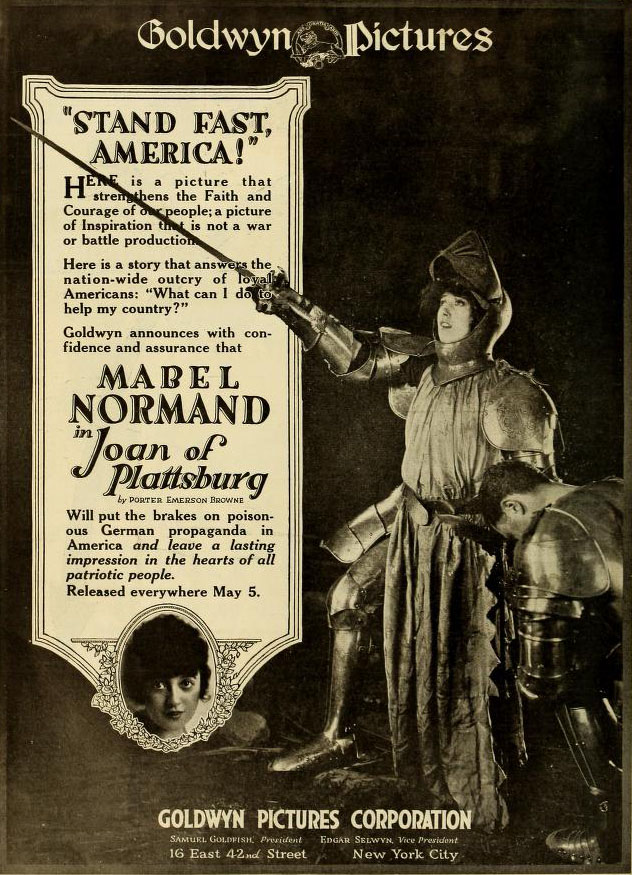
- Film poster
- Directed by: William Humphrey; George Loane Tucker
- Written by: Porter Emerson Browne (story); George Loane Tucker (writer)
- Produced by: Goldwyn Pictures Corporation
- Starring: Mabel Normand
- Cinematography: Oliver T. Marsh
- Distributed by: Goldwyn Pictures
- Release date: May 5, 1918
- Running time: 6 reels
- Country: United States
- Language: Silent (English intertitles)

Joan of Plattsburg is a 1918 American propaganda comedy-drama film co-directed by William Humphrey and George Loane Tucker, written by Tucker from a story by Porter Emerson Browne, photographed by Oliver T. Marsh, released by the Goldwyn Pictures Corporation and starring Mabel Normand. It is not known whether the film currently survives, and it may be a lost film.

== Plot ==
As described in a film magazine, Joan, an orphan, becomes interested in the drilling of soldiers at an American World War I training camp near the orphan asylum of which she is an inmate. One day while evading the angry superintendent, she conceals herself in a cellar and discovers a meeting place of German spies who are plotting. She believes that, like a modern-day Joan of Arc, she's listening to disembodied voices. She reports the matter to the major, who sets out to capture the spies and sends Joan to live with his mother. When he returns from the war, he finds Joan waiting for him.

== Cast ==
- Mabel Normand as Joan
- Robert Elliott as Capt. Lane
- William Frederic as Supt. Fisher (billed as William Fredericks)
- Joseph W. Smiley as Ingleton
- Edward Elkas as Silverstein
- John Webb Dillon as Miggs
- Willard Dashiell as Colonel
- Edith McAlpin as Mrs. Lane
- Isabel Vernon as Mrs. Miggs
