= Limpley Stoke railway station =

Former railway station in England

Limpley Stoke
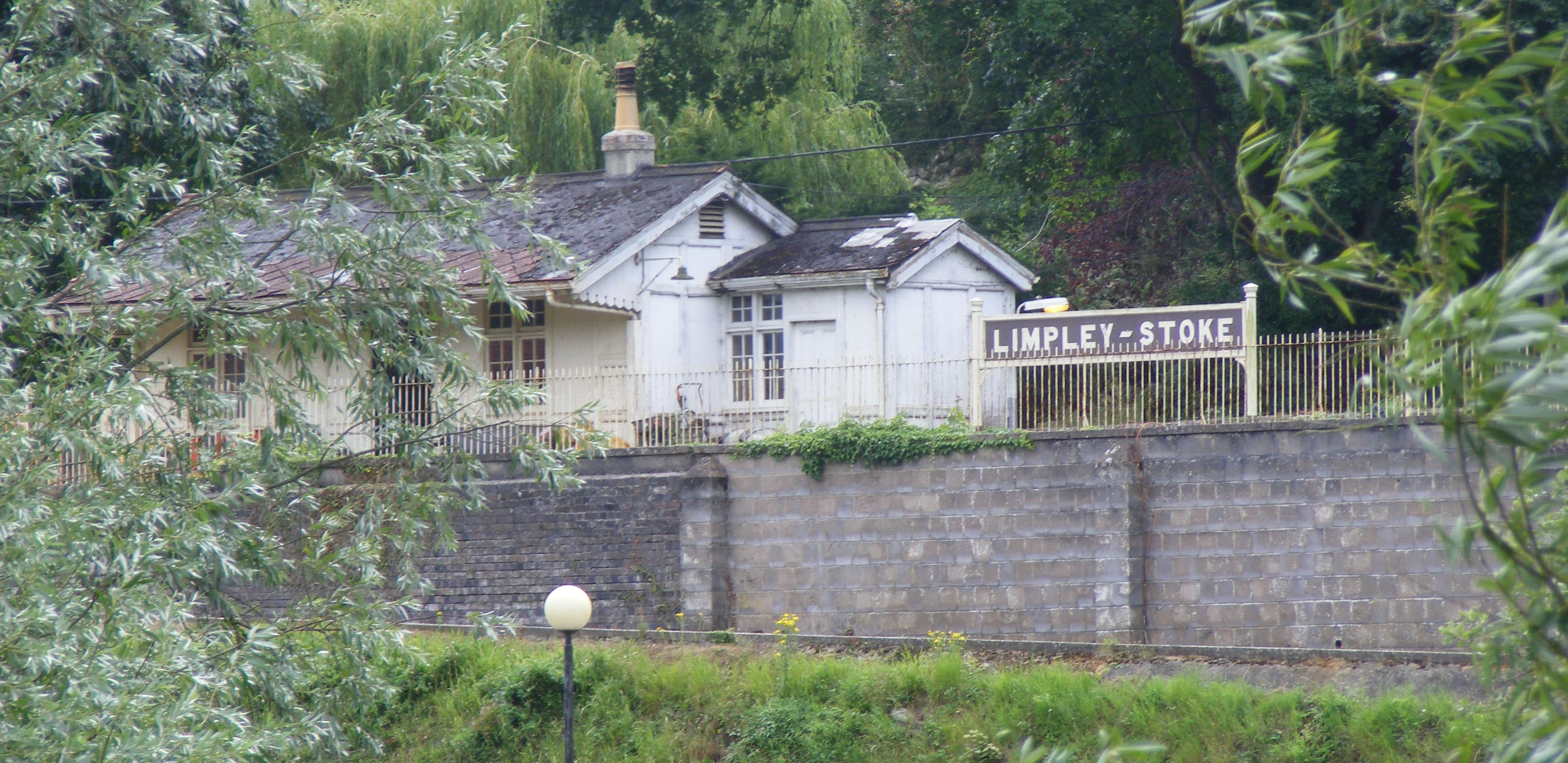
- The station in 2010

General information
- Location: Limpley Stoke, Wiltshire; England
- Coordinates: 51.348599°N 2.314733°W
- Platforms: 2

Other information
- Status: Disused

History
- Original company: Great Western Railway
- Post-grouping: Great Western Railway

Key dates
- 1857: Opened
- 1966: Closed
Location

Limpley Stoke railway station is a former railway station in Limpley Stoke, Wiltshire, England. The station was originally started by the Wilts, Somerset and Weymouth Railway, which was bought by the Great Western Railway before service started. The station served as a loading point for limestone from nearby quarries until 1960. Two camping coaches were positioned here by the Western Region from 1956 to 1957. The station closed in 1966, and the building is now in private hands. The line remains open, and has regular passenger service.

Preceding station	Historical railways	Following station
Monkton Combe Halt; Line and station closed	Great Western Railway; Bristol and North Somerset Railway (Camerton branch)	Freshford; Line and station open
Bathampton; Line open, station closed	Great Western Railway; Wessex Main Line / Heart of Wessex Line	Freshford; Line and station open
