= The Bad Man (1923 film) =

1923 film

- Directed by: Edwin Carewe
- Based on: The Bad Man; 1920 play by Porter Emerson Browne
- Produced by: Edwin Carewe
- Starring: Holbrook Blinn; Jack Mulhall; Walter McGrail; Enid Bennett
- Cinematography: Sol Polito
- Production company: Edwin Carewe Productions
- Distributed by: Associated First National Pictures
- Release date: October 8, 1923
- Running time: 70 minutes (7 reels)
- Country: United States
- Languages: Silent; English intertitles

The Bad Man is a 1923 American silent Western film with prominently featured satirical and comedic elements. The film was directed by Edwin Carewe, who produced it for his own motion picture company and adapted the scenario from the play of the same name by Porter Emerson Browne. The play had opened at Broadway's Comedy Theatre in August 1920, and ran for a very successful 342 performances, closing in June 1921. The film version, from Edwin Carewe Productions, was released by Associated First National Pictures on October 8, 1923. The title role was played by the star of the play's Broadway and touring productions, Holbrook Blinn, and the other leading parts filled by Jack Mulhall, Walter McGrail and Enid Bennett.

== Plot background ==
The titular character, a Mexican outlaw named Pancho Lopez, bore an undisguised resemblance, both in name and personality, to Pancho Villa, a pre-eminent Mexican Revolutionary general. Villa was in the news before and during the play's run and his assassination on July 20, two-and-a-half months before the film's release, appeared in all the headlines. Nine years earlier, a supporting actress in The Bad Man (Teddy Sampson) had played one of Pancho Villa's two sisters in the 1914 Mutual Film feature The Life of General Villa.

== Plot ==
The plotline has Lopez and his band of outlaws living from the proceeds gained as a result of theft and confiscation of property. One of the victims is rancher Gilbert Jones, whose cattle losses are pushing him to the edge of bankruptcy.

Lopez prepares to deprive Jones of the remainder of his cattle and valuables, and kidnap his beloved former sweetheart, who is now married to heartless loan shark Morgan Pell. Lopez recognizes Jones as the man who, years earlier, saved his life. Determined to show his gratitude, the powerful bandit robs the rapacious bank which, in cahoots with Pell, cheats and exploits the locals, and gives the money to Jones. When Pell arrives to foreclose on Jones' oil-rich ranch, Lopez, addressing him as "Mr. Loan-Fish", inquires of him whether women in his country inherit their late husbands' wealth, and then, since he considers the despicable corrupter to be an unworthy opponent, tells his top aide to shoot him (intertitle: "Pedro, I do not hunt rabbits—you keel heem"), thus freeing his widow to marry Jones. Finally, he returns all of Jones' stolen cattle and bids the happy couple farewell, thanking them for making him feel good.

== Cast ==
- Holbrook Blinn as Pancho Lopez
- Jack Mulhall as Gilbert Jones
- Walter McGrail as Morgan Pell
- Enid Bennett as Mrs. Morgan Pell
- Harry Myers as Red Giddings
- Charles A. Sellon as Uncle Henry
- Stanton Heck as Jasper Hardy
- Teddy Sampson as Angela Hardy
- Thomas Delmar as Captain Blake
- Frank Lanning as Indian Cook
- Peter Vanzuella as Pedro

== Production ==
Exteriors for The Bad Man were taken at Roscoe, California.

== Critical reception ==
A year before Mordaunt Hall would receive a byline as The New York Times' first official film critic, an anonymous reviewer, writing for the paper in October 1923, reported that "Blinn seems to take the same Keen enjoyment in playing the part for the screen as he did before the footlights. His is a lesson for motion picture players, for he is never at a loss for a smirk, a smile, a look of surprise, threatening gestures, or interest in what is going on around him. Blinn's hands and feet appear to suit the very expression of his darkened countenance." A writer for Spokane's Spokesman-Review also extolled Blinn's acting and described the picture as "head and shoulders above the average screen performance. The suspense is kept taut enough to snap at any time, the comedy is scintillant, the acting of Holbrook Blinn superb." In examining the 86-year-old film in 2009, critic Ojos de Aguila noted that "Lopez is an allegorical stand-in for the mysterious and appealing side of Mexico and represents the complex tension of attraction and repulsion that marked relations between the United States and Mexico. It is not an irony that his very repulsive nature—the ability to kill—is also the source of his nobleness, albeit a naturalistic and primitive form of nobility."

== Later versions ==
Holbrook Blinn died in June 1928, at the dawn of the sound film era, following complications in the aftermath of a horse-riding accident and, in his September 6, 1930 review of the sound remake, Los Angeles Times' Philip K. Scherer noted that "Porter Emerson Browne's opera bouffe, The Bad Man, is now a talking picture. With Walter Huston in the part Holbrook Blinn would doubtless have taken had he lived, the film opened yesterday at Warner Brothers Downtown Theater." Produced by First National/Vitaphone Pictures, a subsidiary of Warner Bros. Pictures, and directed by Clarence G. Badger, the remake starred, in addition to Huston as Pancho Lopez, Dorothy Revier as Ruth Pell [Mrs. Morgan Pell], James Rennie as Gilbert Jones and Sidney Blackmer as Morgan Pell. In line with common practice during the early years of sound film production, foreign-language versions were simultaneously initiated, with the Spanish-dialogue entry, El hombre malo, directed by Roberto E. Guzmán (actors and staging) and William C. McGann (technical set-ups), spotlighting bi-lingual star Antonio Moreno as Pancho Lopez, while the French-language variant, Lopez, le bandit, helmed by bi-lingual director Jean Daumery, had French actor Geymond Vital portraying Pancho Lopez.

A second remake, still keeping The Bad Man title, adapted by Wells Root and directed by Richard Thorpe for MGM in 1941, starred Wallace Beery, who had already portrayed Pancho Villa in the studio's top-grossing 1934 production, Viva Villa!, as Pancho Lopez, Laraine Day as Lucia Pell [same as the name given to Mrs. Morgan Pell in the Broadway play], Ronald Reagan as Gilbert Jones and Tom Conway as Morgan Pell. In keeping with Beery's by-now-established trademark broad acting style, a greater emphasis was placed on humor, to the extent that the 1941 version is frequently categorized as a comedy. Furthermore, according to a number of film sources, Beery had still additional experience in his portrayal of Villa, having played the part not only in Viva Villa!, but purportedly also seventeen years earlier, in the 1917 serial, Patria, produced by William Randolph Hearst and starring dancer Irene Castle in the title role. The incomplete restored version of Patria does not confirm, however, the presence of either Beery or the character of Pancho Villa.

Between the release of the 1930 and 1941 versions, there was also a semi-disguised one in 1937, West of Shanghai, directed by John Farrow for First National/Warner Bros., which retained most plot elements from Porter Emerson Browne's play, but restructured the setting, character names and other details. The bandit leader was now a warlord, General Fang, played by Boris Karloff who had already portrayed Fu Manchu, in 1932's The Mask of Fu Manchu.

== Preservation ==
With no prints of The Bad Man located in any film archives, it is considered a lost film.
