= The Bad Man (play) =

Play written by Porter Emerson Browne

- Original language: English
- Written by: Porter Emerson Browne
- Genre: Comedy
- Setting: Gilbert Jones ranch house on border with Mexico

Premiere
- Date: August 30, 1920
- Place: Comedy Theatre; New York City, New York

The Bad Man is a 1920 three-act comedy play by American playwright Porter Emerson Browne. The Broadway production at the Comedy Theatre ran for 342 performances beginning August 30, 1920. It was included in Burns Mantle's The Best Plays of 1920–1921.

== Synopsis ==
Playwright Porter Emerson Browne declares a certain timeliness of theme by employing the former Mexican bandit, Pancho Villa, as a hero of the proceedings, though he thinly disguises him under the name of Pancho Lopez. The scene is a cattle ranch near the Mexican border in Arizona. Gilbert Jones, a young American, is the ostensible owner of the ranch, but the $10,000 with which he bought it was borrowed from his uncle, Henry Smith of Bangor, Maine, who is living with him. A year after the purchase young Jones enlisted in the American army, saw service in France, and when he returned found his property practically worthless. Mexican bandits had stolen most of his cattle and such crops as had been planted had failed. In an effort to save the property he mortgaged the ranch to Jasper Hardy, the sheriff of the county, and the play opens the day the mortgage is to be foreclosed by Hardy.

== Production ==
The Bad Man was one of the early successes of the Broadway season. Produced at the Comedy Theatre by William H. Harris Jr. and staged by Lester Lonergan, the play ran from August 30, 1920, until June 1921.

=== Cast ===
- Frank Conroy as Gilbert Jones
- Holbrook Blinn as Pancho Lopez
- Edna Hibbard as Angela Hardy
- James H. Bell as Venustiano
- Frank Bixby as Mexican cook
- Frances Carson as Lucia Pell
- James A. Devine as Henry Smith
- Chief Whitehawk as Alvarado
- Charles Gibney as Bradley
- John Harrington as Red Giddings
- Herbert Heywood as Pedro
- Indian Joe as Felip
- James B. Lenhart as Blake
- Wilson Reynolds as Jasper Hardy
- Fred L. Tiden as Morgan Pell

== Adaptations ==
The play was adapted for three films—The Bad Man (1923) starring Holbrook Blinn; The Bad Man (1930) starring Walter Huston; and The Bad Man (1941) starring Wallace Beery.

The Bad Man was adapted for the CBS Radio series The Campbell Playhouse on May 19, 1939. The cast included Orson Welles (Pancho Lopez), Ida Lupino (Lucia Pell), Frank Readick (Gilbert Phebbs), Ray Collins (Uncle Phipps), William Alland (Morgan Pell), Diana Stevens (Dot), Everett Sloane (Louie) and Edward Jerome (Pedro).
