= The Bad Man (1930 film) =

1930 film directed by Clarence G. Badger

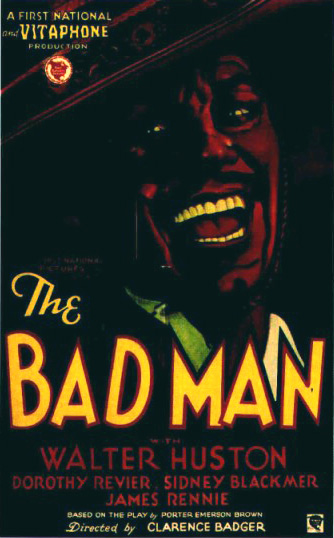
- Theatrical release poster
- Directed by: Clarence G. Badger
- Written by: Howard Estabrook; C.H. Towne
- Screenplay by: Howard Estabrook
- Based on: The Bad Man; 1920 play by Porter Emerson Browne
- Produced by: Robert North
- Starring: Walter Huston; Dorothy Revier; James Rennie; O. P. Heggie; Sidney Blackmer; Myrna Loy
- Cinematography: John F. Seitz
- Edited by: Frank Ware
- Music by: Leonid S. Leonardi
- Production company: First National Pictures
- Distributed by: First National Pictures
- Release date: September 13, 1930
- Running time: 77 minutes
- Country: United States
- Language: English

The Bad Man is a 1930 American pre-Code Western film directed by Clarence G. Badger and starring Walter Huston which was produced and released by First National Pictures, a subsidiary of Warner Bros. Pictures. It is based on Porter Emerson Browne's 1920 play of the same name and is a sound remake of the 1923 silent version of the same name. The film also features Dorothy Revier, Sidney Blackmer, and James Rennie.

== Plot ==
Pancho Lopez, a notorious Mexican bandit, had his life saved by Gilbert Jones. When Gilbert is unable to pay the mortgage on his ranch and is in risk of losing everything, Pancho determines to help him. Morgan Pell, who has reason to believe that there is oil on Gilbert's property, attempts to swindle Gilbert and buy the property from him for a low price. Pancho soon discovers that Gilbert is in love with Morgan's wife, Ruth, and consequently has Morgan shot so that they can pursue their romance. Pancho then robs a bank and uses the money to pay off Gilbert's mortgage. Having the ranch securely in his hands, Gilbert is now free to marry Ruth. As Pancho says goodbye to the couple, he is overtaken by the Texas Rangers and shot.

== Cast ==
- Walter Huston as Pancho Lopez
- Dorothy Revier as Ruth Pell
- James Rennie as Gilbert Jones
- O. P. Heggie as Henry Taylor
- Sidney Blackmer as Morgan Pell
- Marion Byron as Angela Hardy
- Guinn 'Big Boy' Williams as Red Giddings
- Arthur Stone as Pedro
- Edward Lynch as Bradley
- Harry Semels as Jose
- Erville Alderson as Hardy

== Preservation ==
An incomplete nitrate print of this film—8 of 9 reels—survives in the UCLA Film & Television Archive. The entire film is in danger of being lost, however, if the film is still not preserved as of January 2021 or at some point the near future. The film may have already begun to decompose since it was last reported in 2007.

== Original version and remake ==
The film, based on a 1920 play, was originally filmed in 1923 with Holbrook Blinn, who had originated the role in the 1920 Broadway production which ran for a whopping 342 performances. The film was remade in 1940 as The Bad Man with Wallace Beery as Pancho Lopez and a supporting cast including Lionel Barrymore, Laraine Day, and Ronald Reagan.

== Foreign-language versions ==
Two foreign-language versions of the 1930 version of The Bad Man were made. The Spanish version was titled El hombre malo, while the French version was titled Lopez, le bandit.
