= Porter Emerson Browne =

American dramatist

Porter Emerson Browne was an American playwright (June 22, 1879 – September 20, 1934) who was born in Beverly, Massachusetts.

== History ==
He was the author of numerous plays, including A Fool There Was (1909), which was adapted for film twice, in 1915 and 1922; The Spendthrift (1910); Chains (1912); and The Bad Man (1920), adapted for film three times, in 1923, 1930 and 1941.

The Mabel Normand dramatic vehicle Joan of Plattsburg (1918) was also based on a Browne play.

The historian John Toland wrote in his autobiography a loving portrait of Browne. Barely a teenager, Toland aspired to be a writer, and was enthralled when Browne came to live with his family. Browne filled the boy's imagination with stories about serving as Pancho Villa's secretary, writing speeches for Theodore Roosevelt, and pursuing research in China and Japan. He also taught him how to deal cards from the bottom of the deck, “just in case you get into a game with crooks.”

Most importantly, Browne taught him how to be a writer. He took the young Toland to his study and showed him a miniature stage placed next to his typewriter. Small figurines stood on the stage. “I just watch them and let them do everything they have to do,” he told Toland. “Then I type down everything they say.” When Toland wrote his autobiography in his eighties, after having written many books, he still remembered Browne's example. He credited Browne for teaching him how to listen, even as he interviewed heinous figures important in history, without judgement. Like Browne, Toland provided structure and context, and then wrote down everything they had to say.
