= The Bad Man (1941 film) =

1941 film by Richard Thorpe

- Theatrical release poster
- Directed by: Richard Thorpe
- Screenplay by: Wells Root
- Based on: The Bad Man; 1920 play by Porter Emerson Browne
- Produced by: J. Walter Ruben
- Starring: Wallace Beery; Lionel Barrymore; Laraine Day; Ronald Reagan; Tom Conway; Chill Wills
- Cinematography: Clyde De Vinna
- Edited by: Conrad A. Nervig
- Music by: Franz Waxman
- Production company: Metro-Goldwyn-Mayer
- Distributed by: Loew's Inc.
- Release date: April 3, 1941 (New York)
- Running time: 70 minutes
- Country: United States
- Language: English

The Bad Man is a 1941 American Western film directed by Richard Thorpe and starring Wallace Beery and featuring Lionel Barrymore, Laraine Day and Ronald Reagan. The script was written by Wells Root from the 1920 Porter Emerson Browne play of the same name. The film is a remake of the 1923 silent version and the 1930 remake starring Walter Huston.

The film is printed in a warm sepia tone, lending it a distinctive dusty, antique visual quality suited to its frontier setting.

== Plot ==
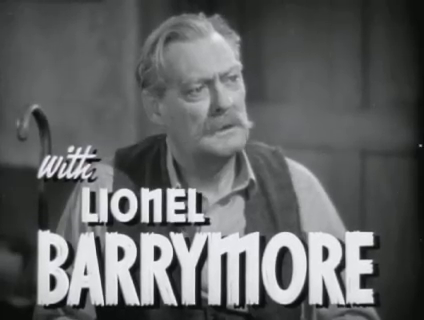
Lionel Barrymore as Henry Jones

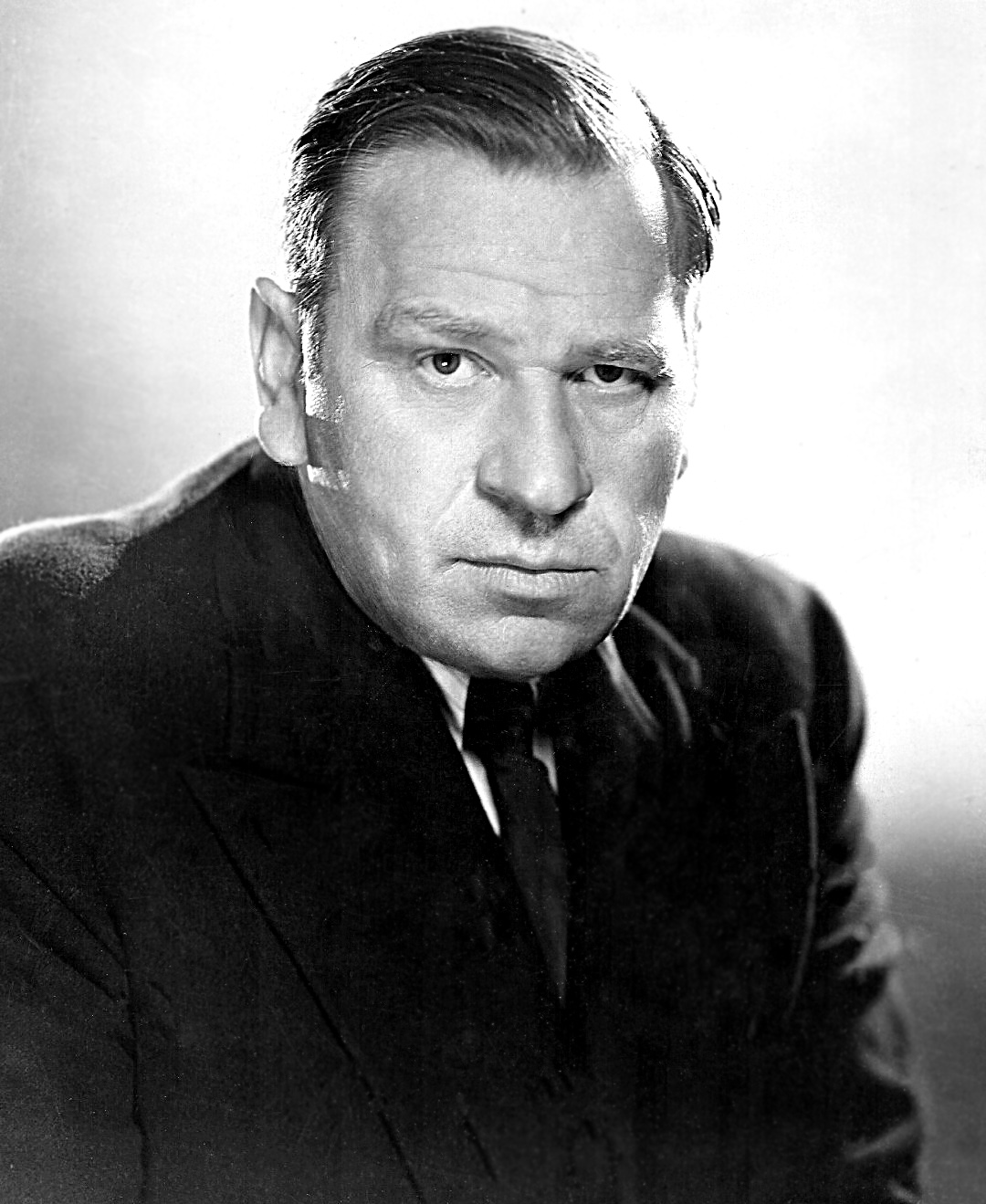
Wallace Beery as Pancho Lopez

Gil Jones is staying at his ranch in Mexico. His Uncle Henry, Jones, bound to a wheelchair, lives there. Unexpectedly, Gil's childhood sweetheart, Lucia comes to visit with her husband Morgan Pell, a New York businessman. Later that afternoon, the bandit Pancho Lopez raids the ranch, stealing all the cattle. During a firefight, Gil is wounded. Henry is upset over the loss of cattle because now they are broke; he also is worried over Lucia's concern for Gil. Later in the evening, Morgan privately tells Lucia that he has been happy in their marriage, but fears she may still love Gil. She promises Morgan that she will stay with him.

A month later, Lucia and Morgan come to visit Gil's ranch again. One day, Morgan goes into town on business. Gil and Lucia talk theoretically about love. Lucia reveals that she could never leave Morgan because he loves her so much. The banker Jasper Hardy arrives at the ranch with his daughter Angela; he is there to offer to buy the ranch, which is facing immediate foreclosure. Henry jokes that Gil should marry Angela.

Meanwhile, ranch hand "Red" Gidding walks around the ranch with Angela, with whom he has always been in love. Morgan returns from town and offers to buy the ranch for $20,000. Hardy is angry to have a competitor. Suspicious that these two men want a worthless ranch, Henry finally gets them to admit that the ranch may contain oil deposits. When Morgan raises his offer, Gil accepts at it and signs the sales agreement. Lucia is disappointed in Morgan. Gil then goes out to the barn.

Suddenly, Lopez and his gang arrive again and take everyone hostage, except for Gil, who is still in the barn. Lopez likes Henry and is attracted to Lucia, with whom he discusses love and freedom. The bandit immediately dislikes Morgan; he already hates Hardy because he is a banker. Lopez takes the mortgage document from Hardy and gives it to Gil. Unhappy about Gil selling the ranch, Henry tells Lopez about Hardy and Morgan conniving to get it. Then Lopez surprises everyone by saying the ranch has oil and he knows where to find it. He also claims that he is the rightful owner of the ranch.

Morgan and Hardy start a bidding war for the property, finally offering Lopez $200,000. However, he was lying about the oil; he only wanted to determine how much Hardy and Morgan were worth for ransom. Lopez and his men take everyone outside, but they encounter Gil, who is aiming a rifle at Lopez. However, the bandits manage to overcome Gil and Lopez orders him hanged, even though he is impressed with Gil's bravery.

As Gil is strung to a tree, Lopez suddenly recognizes him as the man who had saved his life five years before. He tells his men to cut Gil down and says that he wants to repay him by "changing the laws around here." Henry then explains to Lopez the unhappy romances at the ranch. Lopez uses some psychology to help Angela realize that she really loves Red.

Lopez then declares that he will kill Morgan, enabling Lucia and Gil to marry. Gil protest, saying that he doesn't want anyone hurt. When Lopez tells Morgan that he will be killed, he quickly offers to divorce Lucia. Lopez despises Morgan's cowardice and is unswayed by his further offer of money plus his wife. Lopez orders his man Pedro to take Morgan into the canyon to kill him. Lopez rides away with his men, saying that he will make Gil happy whether he wants it or not. In the canyon, Morgan tries to bribe Pedro without success. However, Pedro is distracted by the sounds of a firefight between the Lopez gang and "the policia," Morgan grabs Pedro's gun and shoots him dead.

Back inside the ranch house, Gil returns the mortgage to Hardy, who hastily leaves with Angela. Gil then comforts Lucia about her husband's pending murder. Morgan then arrives and sees the two of them together. He orders Lucia to leave the ranch with him, but she refuses. When he tries to draw his gun, Gil jumps on Morgan. During the scuffle, Lopez appears at the door and shoots Morgan to death. Lopez tells Gil about the murder of Pedro, and says "now everything is fixed."

When Lopez learns that Hardy has the mortgage again and the foreclosure sale is coming up quick, he offers to sell the stolen cattle to pay it off. Lopez then gives Henry's wheelchair a fast-paced tow to town to pay off the mortgage before the foreclosure sale.

== Cast ==
Ronald Reagan as Gil Jones

- Wallace Beery as Pancho Lopez
- Lionel Barrymore as Henry Jones
- Laraine Day as Lucia Pell
- Ronald Reagan as Gil Jones
- Henry Travers as Jasper Hardy
- Chris-Pin Martin as Pedro
- Tom Conway as Morgan Pell
- Chill Wills as Red Giddings
- Nydia Westman as Angela Hardy
- Charles Stevens as Venustiano
- Nydia Westman as Angela Hardy

== Production ==
Portions of The Bad Man were filmed in Flagstaff, Arizona, and Gallup, New Mexico.

== Reception ==
In a contemporary review for The New York Times, critic Thomas M. Pryor called the The Bad Man "the most static and loquacious Western we've encountered in a long time" and wrote: "You've seen 'The Bad Man' before, at least twice under its rightful title and goodness knows how many times under an assortment of aliases. ... Metro's mistake in this instance is that it stuck too close to the old Porter Emerson Browne play—so close that the film is practically a carbon copy of a three-act play in two scenes. Except for a Keystone ending, most of the action is confined to the living room of a ranch hard by the Rio Grande. As a consequence the actors just talk on and on, and what they have to say is, unfortunately, uninteresting."
