= Holbrook Blinn =

American actor (1872–1928)

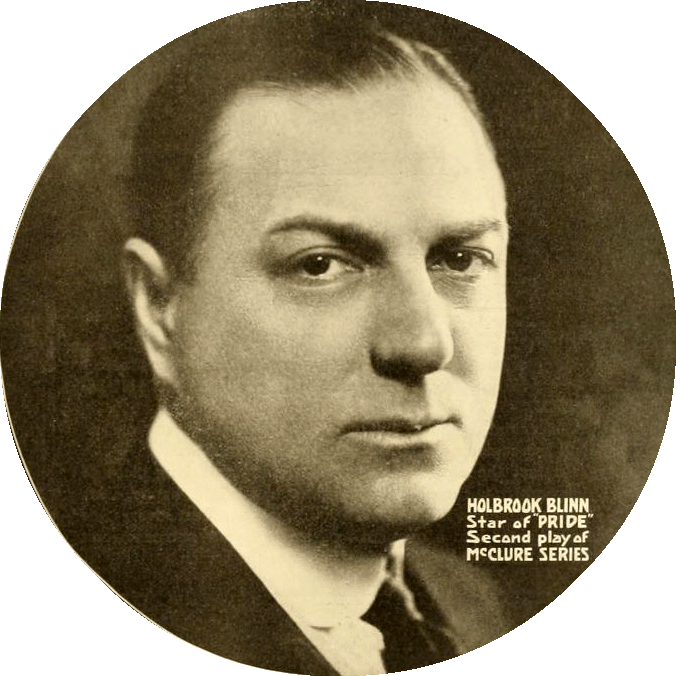
- Blinn in 1916
- Born: January 23, 1872; San Francisco, California, U.S.
- Died: 1928 (aged 55–56); Croton-on-Hudson, New York, U.S.
- Occupation: Actor
- Years active: 1897–1927
- Spouse: Ruth Benson

Holbrook Blinn (January 23, 1872 – June 24, 1928) was an American stage and film actor.

== Early years ==
Blinn was the son of American Civil War veteran Col. Charles Blinn and actress Nellie Holbrook-Blinn. He was born in San Francisco and attended Stanford University before he began a career in acting.

== Biography ==
Blinn debuted on stage as an adult early in the 1890s with a traveling company in the western United States. By 1892 he had moved to the East, acting for two seasons in The New South. Following that experience, he headed the first dramatic troupe to tour in Alaska.

Blinn had appeared on the legitimate stage at age 6, in The Streets of London, and played throughout the United States and in London. He appeared in silent films and was the director of popular one-act plays at New York's Princess Theatre. He was also one of the founders of that theatre.

For three years Blinn acted in London in The Only Way, Don Juan's Last Wager, and Ib and Little Christina. His Broadway stage successes include The Duchess of Dantzic (1903, as Napoleon), Salvation Nell (1908) in a breakout performance as the brutish husband of Mrs. Fiske, Within the Law (1912), Molière (1919), A Woman of No Importance (1916), The Lady of the Camellias (1917), and Getting Together (1918).

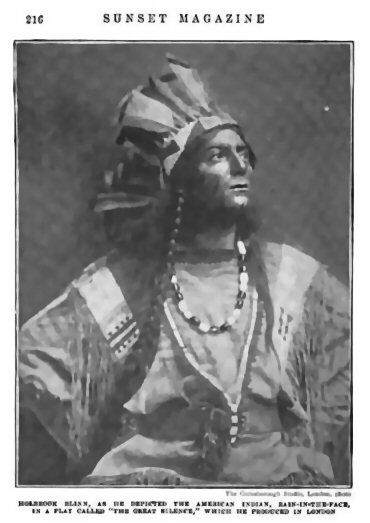
Blinn as Chief Rain-in-the-Face in the play The Great Silence (Sunset Magazine, Nov. 1905 – April, 1906)

Some of his finest silent screen accomplishments are in McTeague (1916), The Bad Man (1923), Rosita (1923), Yolanda (1924), and Janice Meredith (1924), the latter two films both starring Marion Davies.

In 1928, Blinn was unanimously elected president of the Actors' Fidelity League.

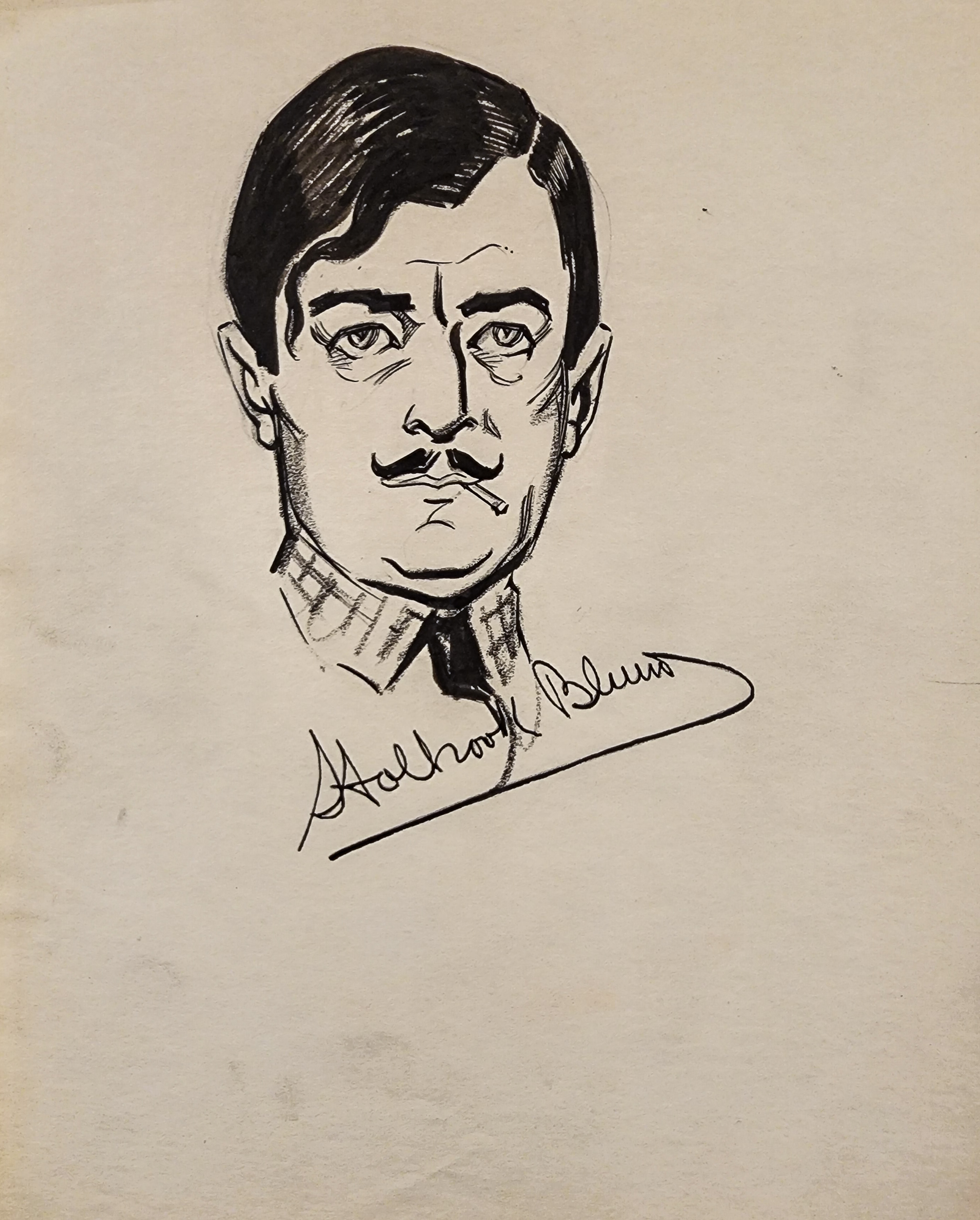
Signed drawing of Holbrook Blinn by Manuel Rosenberg 1922

== Personal life and death ==
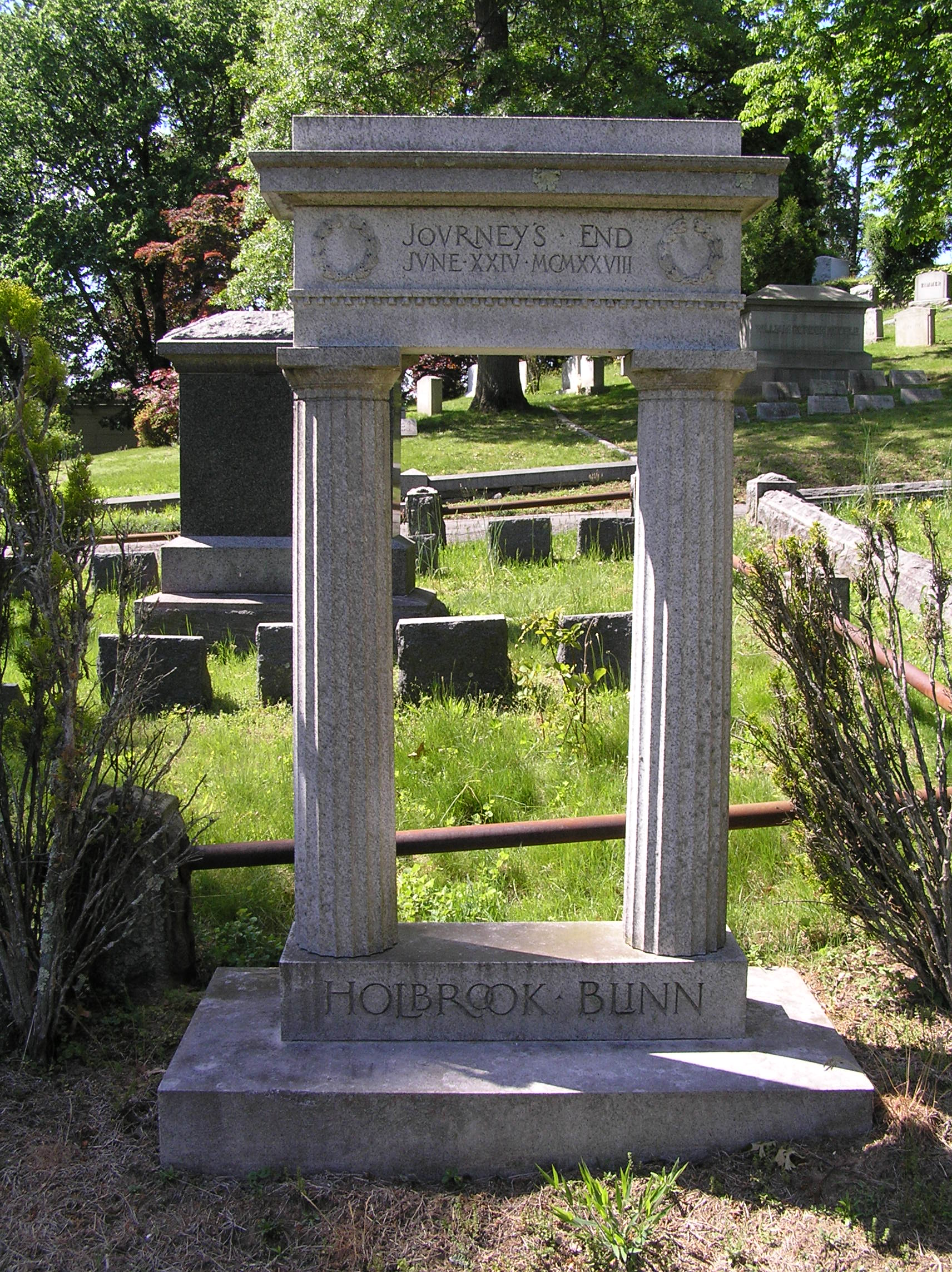
The gravesite of Holbrook Blinn in Sleepy Hollow Cemetery

At the time of his death, Blinn was married to the former Ruth Benson, an actress.

Blinn died from complications of a fall off his horse near Journey's End, his Croton-on-Hudson, New York home, and is buried in Sleepy Hollow Cemetery in Sleepy Hollow, New York.

== Selected filmography ==
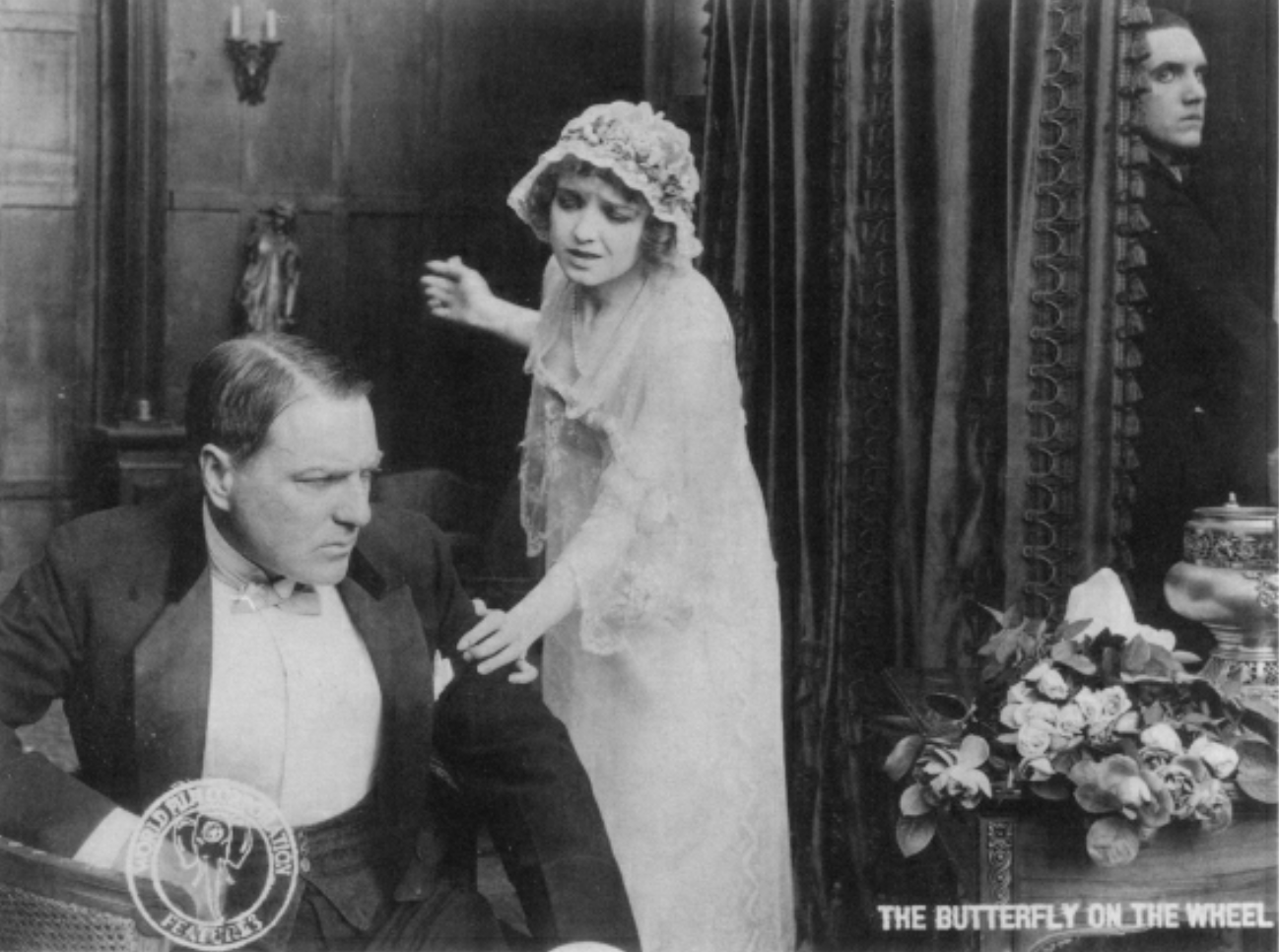
Holbrook with Vivian Martin in The Butterfly on the Wheel (1915)

- The Butterfly on the Wheel (1915)
- The Ballet Girl (1916)
- Husband and Wife (1916)
- McTeague (1916)
- The Weakness of Man (1916)
- The Empress (1917)
- Pride (1917)
- The Seventh Sin (1917)
- Rosita (1923)
- Yolanda (1924)
- Janice Meredith (1924)
- Zander the Great (1925)
- The New Commandment (1925)
- The Unfair Sex (1926)
- The Telephone Girl (1927)

== Sources ==
- Great Stars of the American Stage, Profile #65 by Daniel C. Blum c.1952;1954 edition 2nd printing
