= Winifred Boggs =

English humorous novelist (1874–1931)

- Born: 26 January 1874; Birkenhead, Cheshire, England
- Died: 10 November 1931 (aged 57); Belsize Park, Hampstead, London, England
- Occupation: Novelist

Winifred Boggs (26 January 1874 – 10 November 1931) was an English short story writer and novelist who also used two pseudonyms, Edward Burke and Gloria Manning.

== Early life ==
Mary Winifred Boggs was born in Birkenhead, then in Cheshire, the eldest of seven children of Robert Macintyre Boggs, a Merchant, and Mary Elizabeth Boggs, née Darwell, who came from a prominent family in Southport. Robert Boggs became an Insurance Inspector and according to Census records, later children were born in Surrey, Monmouth, Herefordshire and Anglesey, indicating that they moved several times. Robert Boggs died aged 48 in 1892 when Winifred was 18 and the family was living in Manchester. The family was still in Manchester in the 1901 Census when Winfred was 27 and had started to publish short stories, but no profession was stated.

== Literary works ==
In June 1900 aged 26, Winifred Boggs published her first known short story in The Ludgate Monthly. Her education is indicated by her next publication, a short story translated from the French called The Little Comrade which appeared in The Argosy, another Victorian story magazine. More than 20 short stories followed including eight published between 1904 and 1908 in The Lady's Realm.

Winfred Boggs’ first novel, entitled The Return of Richard Carr, was published in March 1907 by Hutchinson. It was advertised in The Daily Mail as the newspaper’s ‘Prize Novel’, presumably the result of a competition. Her second novel, Ethel Pilcher, which started as a short story in 1903 in a weekly magazine, was issued in July of the same year by Ward, Lock & Co.

Two years later, in 1909, Winifred Boggs published her first novel that did not use her own name. The novel Improper Prue was published anonymously in the UK by John Long, but in the USA it was issued under the name Gloria Manning. She published two more novels in the U.K., both advertised as written by ‘The Author of Improper Prue’: The Price of Possession in 1912 and Salad Days: a Comedy of Youth in 1914, also issued by John Long. Neither were published in the USA.

Boggs’s second anonymous novel was made into a film by Paramount Pictures in 1921, also called The Price of Possession. It was directed by Hugh Ford and starred Ethel Clayton and Rockliffe Fellowes. Winfred Boggs is credited as the author in articles about the film and on the advertising material for the film. The novel was re-issued in 1921 in the UK by Herbert Jenkins, who by then had become her main publisher.

In 1913 Winifred Boggs published another novel using a different pseudonym: Bachelors Buttons: The Candid Confessions of a Shy Bachelor by Edward Burke, the first of several humorous novels published by Herbert Jenkins. Boggs published five more novels using the pseudonym Edward Burke, although The Sale of Lady Daventry (Herbert Jenkins, 1913) was initially released anonymously as it was considered to be sensational and caused speculation about who had written it. Only later was the novel credited to The Author of Bachelors Buttons and, later still, it was acknowledged that Edward Burke was Winifred Boggs.

The reason for using pseudonyms may be captured in the request of a reviewer of Winifred Boggs’ fourth novel, Vagabond City (G.P. Putnams Sons, 1911), who wrote: ‘Miss Boggs: might we plead for a more euphonious nom de plume’.

In June 1915 Herbert Jenkins published Winifred Boggs’ best known novel, Sally on the Rocks, also published in the US by Brentano’s. It was re-issued in 2021 in the British Library 'Women Writers' series, and is her only novel currently in print.

As well as publishing five novels using the pseudonym Edward Burke, Winfred Boggs also wrote seven more novels in her own name after Sally on the Rocks, between 1921 and 1930. This may have taken its toll as it is reported that she had a nervous breakdown as a result of ‘the strain of having two different literary personalities’.

Several of Boggs’s novels were translated into Spanish.

== Personal life ==
Very little is known about Winifred Boggs’ personal life. She was recorded in the 1911 census living with her mother and two unmarried sisters in Ormskirk, her profession given as Novelist. By 1920 she was living in a flat in Belsize Park in London and in the same year attended two literary dinners there, a 'Novelist’s Dinner' and a 'War Writer’s Dinner'. In an interview in 1921 she said that she got her best ideas while lying in the bath and that her occupations were bridge and tennis.

Winifred Boggs died of a cerebral aneurysm in Hampstead on 16 November 1931 aged 57. She was buried at Hampstead Cemetery. She was unmarried.

== Novels ==
- Boggs, Winifred (1907) The Return of Richard Carr. London: Hutchinson.
- Boggs, Winifred (1907) Ethel Pilcher. London: Ward, Lock & Co.
- Anonymous (1909) Improper Prue. London: John Long; New York: B.W. Dodge & Co, by Gloria Manning.
- Boggs, Winifred (1911). Vagabond City. London: G.P. Putnam’s Sons.
- By the Author of Improper Prue (1912) The Price of Possession. London: John Long.
- Burke, Edward (1913). Bachelors' Buttons. London: Herbert Jenkins. New York: Moffat, Yard and Company.
- Anonymous (1913). The Sale of Lady Daventry. London: Herbert Jenkins; Toronto: Bell & Cockburn. Later issue: London, Herbert Jenkins by the Author of Bachelor’s Buttons (Edmund Burke).
- Burke, Edward (1914). The Bewildered Benedict: A Superfluous Uncle. London: Herbert Jenkins.
- By the author of Improper Prue (1914). Salad Days: a Comedy of Youth. London: John Long.
- Boggs, Winifred (1915). Sally On The Rocks. London: Herbert Jenkins; New York: Brentano’s.
- Burke, Edward (1916). My Wife. London: Herbert Jenkins; New York: E.P. Dutton.
- Boggs, Winifred (1918). Yesterday: being the Confessions of Barbara. London: Herbert Jenkins.
- Boggs, Winifred (1921). The Indignant Spinsters. London: Herbert Jenkins.
- Burke, Edward (1922). The Spinster Aunt. London: Herbert Jenkins.
- Boggs, Winifred (1923). The Joyous Pilgrim. London: Herbert Jenkins.
- Burke, Edward (1924). Getting Rid Of Uncle, a revised edition of A Bewildered Benedict. London: Herbert Jenkins.
- Boggs, Winifred (1925). Ashmorlands. London: Herbert Jenkins.
- Boggs, Winifred (1927). The Young Elizabeth. London: Herbert Jenkins.
- Boggs, Winifred (1929). Murder On The Underground. London: Herbert Jenkins.
- Boggs, Winifred (1930). The Romance Of A Very Young Man. London: Herbert Jenkins.
