= South Sea Love =

South Sea Love may refer to:

- South Sea Love (1927 film), an American silent drama film
- South Sea Love (1923 film), an American silent film
