= The Savage Woman =

The Savage Woman refers to:

- The Savage Woman (1918 film), American film
- The Savage Woman (1991 film), Canadian film
