= The Web of Desire =

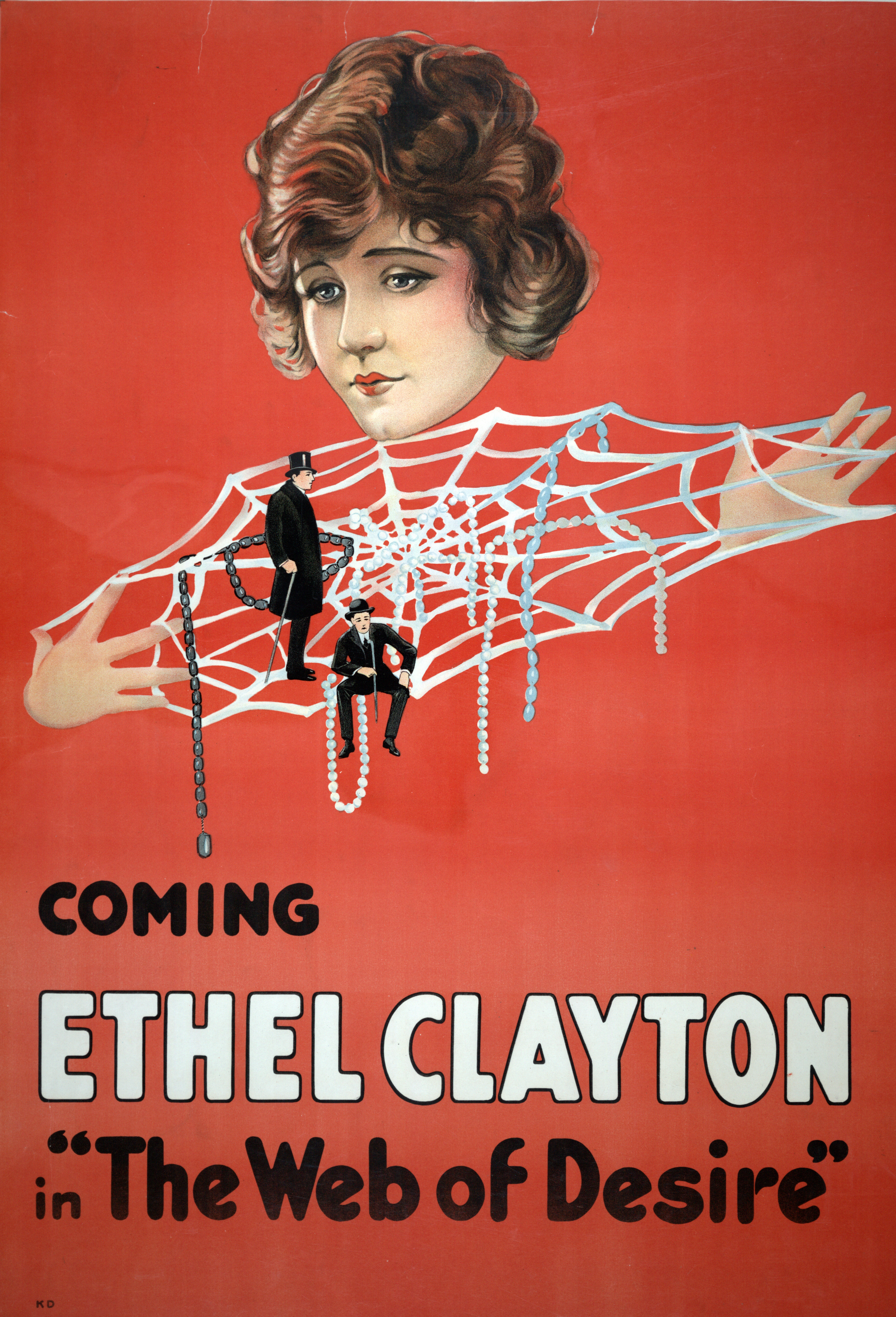
- film poster
- Directed by: Emile Chautard
- Written by: Frances Marion
- Based on: story by E. Lloyd Sheldon
- Starring: Ethel Clayton; Rockliffe Fellowes
- Cinematography: Lucien Tainguy
- Production companies: Peerless Studios; World Film
- Distributed by: World Pictures
- Release date: March 5, 1917
- Running time: 50 minutes
- Country: USA
- Language: Silent..English titles

The Web of Desire is a lost 1917 silent film drama directed by Emile Chautard and starring Ethel Clayton. It was produced by Peerless Studios and distributed through World Pictures.

== Cast ==
- Ethel Clayton - Grace Miller
- Rockliffe Fellowes - John Miller
- Doris Field - Mrs. Langley
- Edward M. Kimball - Thomas Hurd
- Madge Evans - Marjorie
- William A. Williams - Robert Elwell

== Reception ==
Wid's Films gave a mixed review, finding the story to be "surface melodrama" and that Ethel Clayton's acting wasn't enough to make her character "register." Criticism was also leveled against Rockliffe Fellowes because "he lacks the personality needed to gain the proper sympathy in screen portrayals." The reviewer said of the twist ending "Oh, boy!—it was SOME finish!"

Motion Picture News reviewer Peter Milne gave the film a positive review, saying of the story "Save for the obvious familiarity of the majority of its passages it produces the amount of sustained interest necessary to carry a picture of its length."

Moving Picture World reviewer Edward Weitzel also gave the film a positive review, and said "This familiar situation is handled with a fair show of dramatic skill."

Variety gave the film a positive review, saying that despite its predictable story, "Exceptional care and attention to fine interiors and an intelligent and painstaking production throughout."
