= The Mirror (1915 film) =

- Directed by: Joseph Kaufman
- Written by: Shannon Fife (story); Lawrence McCloskey (story)
- Produced by: Siegmund Lubin
- Starring: Crane Wilbur; Ethel Clayton; Thurston Hall; Mary Carr
- Distributed by: General Film Company
- Release date: August 27, 1915 (U.S.)
- Running time: 30 minutes
- Country: USA
- Language: Silent with English titles

The Mirror is a 1915 silent short dramatic film directed by Joseph Kaufman and produced by the Lubin Manufacturing Company in Philadelphia.

== Cast ==
- Crane Wilbur — The Mountaineer
- Ethel Clayton — The Mountain Girl
- Thurston Hall — The Rival
- Bartley McCullum — The Doctor
- Mary Carr — The Rival's Invalid Mother (*as Mrs. Carr)
