= More Deadly Than the Male =

1919 film by Robert G. Vignola

More Deadly Than The Male
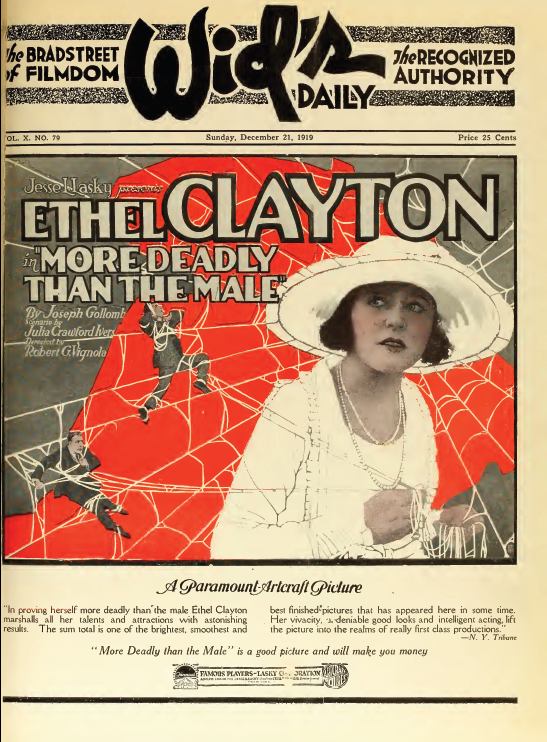
- Directed by: Robert G. Vignola
- Written by: Joseph Gollomb (story "The Female of the Species" in Saturday Evening Post); Julia Crawford Ivers (scenario)
- Produced by: Jesse L. Lasky
- Starring: Ethel Clayton
- Cinematography: James Van Trees
- Production company: Famous Players–Lasky
- Distributed by: Paramount Pictures
- Release date: December 7, 1919 (Limited)
- Running time: 50 minutes (5 reels)
- Country: United States
- Language: Silent (English intertitles)

More Deadly Than The Male is a 1919 silent film comedy adventure produced by Famous Players–Lasky and released by Paramount Pictures. Robert G. Vignola directed and Ethel Clayton stars.

== Plot ==
As described in a film magazine, Helen O'Hara, actress and manager, is in love with Richard Carlin. Richard is a man of the world, more fond of roaming in foreign countries and exploring other lands rather than enjoying the comforts of city or country life. Helen decides to change his habits and make of him a useful citizen. With this purpose, she stages a little drama in which Richard makes ardent love to her and is caught by her husband who is then shot and killed in the encounter that follows. Up to this point all has gone as planned, but the police step in and take Richard into custody. Helen is forced to produce her "dead" brother who played the role of her husband, and explains to the police that it was only a trick. Richard admires the woman's cleverness, admits his love, and decides to forgo any further world travels.

== Cast ==
- Ethel Clayton as Helen O'Hara
- Edward Coxen as Richard Carlin
- Herbert Heyes as Terry O'Hara
- Hallam Cooley as Jimmy Keen
- Peggy Pearce as Angela

== Preservation status ==
This is now considered to be a lost film.
