= Robert Conville =

American actor (1881 - 1950)

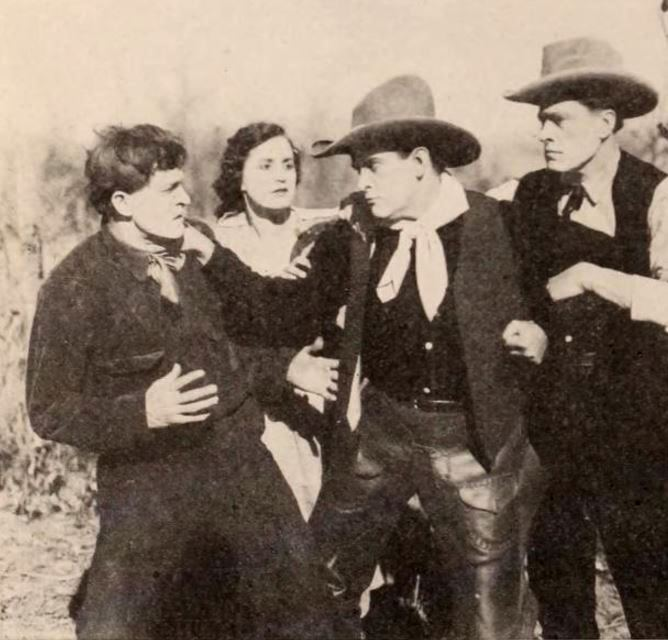
- left to right: Robert Conville, Ethel Dwyer, Jack Mower and Al Hart in Cotton and Cattle, 1921
- Born: Robert Waltruss Conville; 1881; Maine, US
- Died: February 28, 1950 (aged 68–69); Los Angeles, California, US
- Resting place: Pacific Crest Cemetery, Redondo Beach, California (Los Angeles County)
- Occupation: Actor
- Years active: 1913-1923

Robert Conville (1881 - 1950) was an American silent film and theatrical actor. He appeared in several films with Marguerite Clark. He also appeared in several films that are not listed in sources. He was born in Maine and died in Los Angeles, California, in 1950.

== Selected filmography ==
- Still Waters (1915)
- Mice and Men (1916)
- Out of the Drifts (1916)
- Nanette of the Wilds (1916)
- Laughing Bill Hyde (1918)
- The Sin That Was His (1920)
- Out of the Clouds (1921)
- The Blonde Vampire (1922)
- South Sea Love (1923)
