= Laughing Bill Hyde =

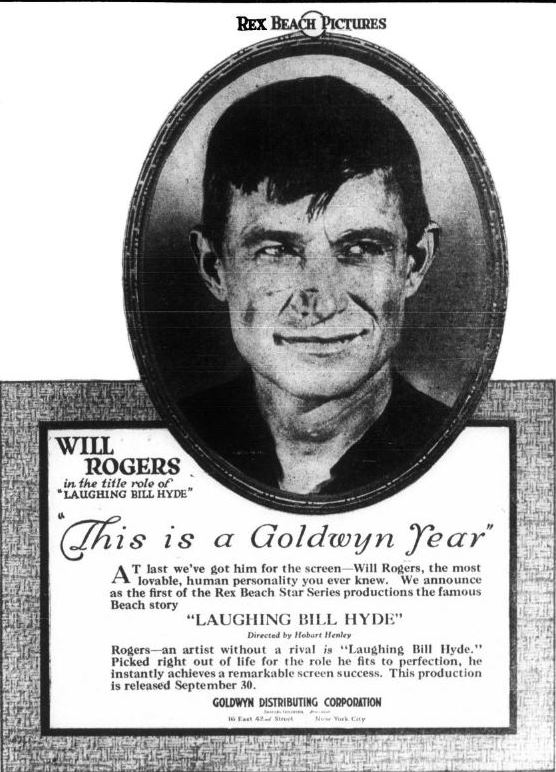
- Film's promotion in Variety, August 1918
- Directed by: Hobart Henley
- Screenplay by: Willard Mack
- Based on: Laughing Bill Hyde by Rex Beach
- Produced by: Samuel Goldwyn
- Starring: Will Rogers; Anna Lehr; Clarence Oliver; Joseph Herbert; Robert Conville; Dan Mason
- Cinematography: Arthur A. Cadwell
- Production company: Rex Beach Pictures Company
- Distributed by: Goldwyn Pictures
- Release date: September 22, 1918
- Running time: 66 minutes
- Country: United States
- Language: Silent (English intertitles)

Laughing Bill Hyde is a lost 1918 American adventure film directed by Hobart Henley and written by Willard Mack. The film stars Will Rogers, Anna Lehr, Clarence Oliver, Joseph Herbert, Robert Conville, and Dan Mason. The film was released on September 22, 1918, by Goldwyn Pictures. It was filmed at the Fort Lee studios.

== Plot ==
Convict Bill Hyde (Will Rogers) and his friend, Danny Dorgan (Dan Mason), break out of prison, but in running from the guards, Danny is mortally wounded. The local doctor, Evan Thomas (Clarence Oliver), tries so hard to save Danny that later, when Bill and the doctor meet in Alaska, the two become friends. A dying man gives his mine to the doctor, but upon discovering that it is worthless, Bill sells it to a crook named John Wesley Slayforth (Joseph Herbert) for $50,000. Slayforth attempts to cheat Ponotah (Anna Lehr), a part Indian woman who owns another mine in which he has an interest, and Bill secures employment in the mine in order to investigate. When he learns that the superintendent is systematically stealing gold from the mine, Bill in turn robs him and buries the money near his cabin. Most of the gold he gives to Ponotah, who accepts his marriage proposal, while the $50,000 goes to the doctor, enabling him to return home and wed the girl of his heart.

== Cast ==
- Will Rogers as Bill Hyde
- Anna Lehr as Ponotah
- Clarence Oliver as Dr. Evan Thomas
- Joseph Herbert as Joseph Wesley Slayforth
- Robert Conville as Denny Slevin
- Dan Mason as Denny Dorgan
- John St. Polis as Black Jack Burg
- Mabel Ballin as Alice Walker
