= Pauline Garrette Kimball =

American actress (1860–1919)

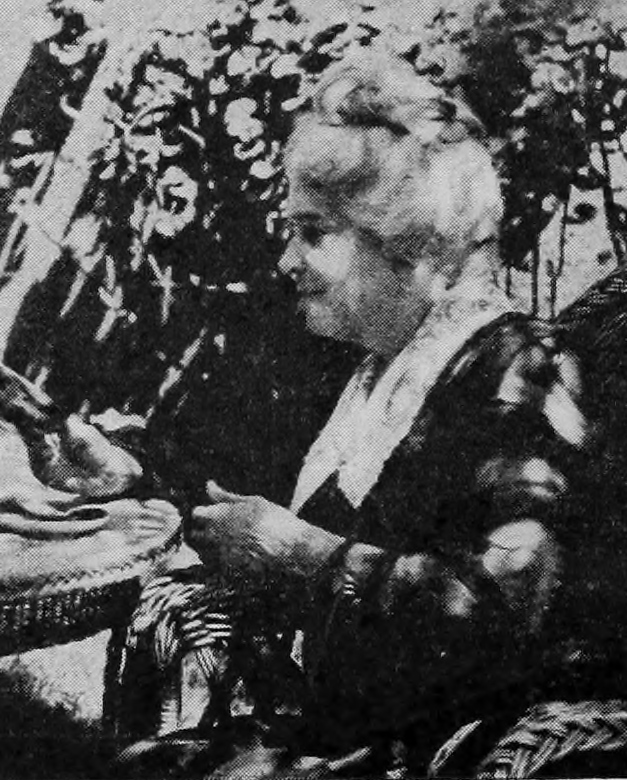
Pauline Garrette Kimball

Pauline Garrette Kimball (March 15, 1860 – December 11, 1919), also called as Mrs. E. M. Kimball, was an American actress of the silent era. She acted in a number of movies in the silent era including The Deep Purple (1915), The Yellow Passport (1916) and The Feast of Life (1916). She also performed in comic opera such as Princess Ida.

== Biography ==
Born as Pauline Madeline Garrette on March 15, 1860, in Chicago, Illinois, Pauline Garrette Kimball was the daughter of Lawrence Garrett (1829–1898) and his wife Julia M Jardee (1835–1908). She attended the Chicago High School and later graduated from the Vassar College. She began her career as a stage actress.

She was married to Edward Marshall Kimball, an American male actor of the silent era. They had only child, Clara Kimball Young, an American film actress.

She died, at the age of 59, on December 11, 1919, in Los Angeles, California.
