= Burn 'Em Up Barnes =

- Directed by: Colbert Clark; Armand Schaefer
- Written by: Colbert Clark; Sherman L. Lowe; Al Martin; John Rathmell; Barney A. Sarecky; Armand Schaefer
- Produced by: Nat Levine; Victor Zobel
- Starring: Jack Mulhall; Frankie Darro; Lola Lane; Julian Rivero; Edwin Maxwell; Jason Robards; Francis McDonal
- Cinematography: Ernest Miller; William Nobles
- Edited by: Earl Turner
- Music by: Lee Zahler
- Distributed by: Mascot Pictures
- Release date: June 16, 1934
- Running time: 12 chapters (210 minutes)
- Country: United States
- Language: English

Burn 'Em Up Barnes is a 1934 American pre-Code movie serial produced and distributed by Mascot Pictures, along with a feature version of the serial bearing the same title. It was a loose remake of the 1921 silent film of the same name.

== Cast ==
- Jack Mulhall as Burn-'em-Up Barnes, racing driver nicknamed the "King of the Dirt Track" and shortly the co-owner of the Temple Barnes Transportation school bus company
- Frankie Darro as Bobbie Riley, Barnes' kid sidekick and ward following his brother's accidental death
- Lola Lane as Marjorie Temple, owner of the Temple (later Temple Barnes) Transportation school bus company and land with a hidden wealth of oil
- Julian Rivero as Tony, Marjorie's bumbling Italian-accented mechanic
- Edwin Maxwell as Lyman Warren
- Jason Robards as John Drummond, crooked race promoter who knows that Marjorie's land is really worth millions and will stop at nothing to get it
- Francis McDonald as Ray Ridpath, villainous driver working for Drummond

== Chapter titles ==
1. King of the Dirt Tracks
2. The Newsreel Murder
3. The Phantom Witness
4. The Celluloid Clue
5. The Decoy Driver
6. The Crimson Alibi
7. Roaring Rails
8. The Death Crash
9. The Man Higher Up
10. The Missing Link
11. Surrounded
12. The Fatal Whisper

_{Source:}

== DVD release ==
Burn 'Em Up Barnes was released on Region 0 DVD by Alpha Video on November 27, 2007. A feature-length version of the serial was released on Region 0 DVD-R by Alpha Video on October 30, 2012, but this is not the same as the feature version originally prepared by Mascot Pictures; its origins are unknown. The 1921 silent version of the serial was released on Region 0 DVD-R by Alpha Video on July 7, 2015.

== See also ==
- List of film serials by year
- List of film serials by studio
- List of films in the public domain in the United States

Preceded by The Lost Jungle (1934)	Mascot Serial; Burn 'Em Up Barnes (1934)	Succeeded by The Law of the Wild (1934)
