= Rockliffe Fellowes =

Canadian actor

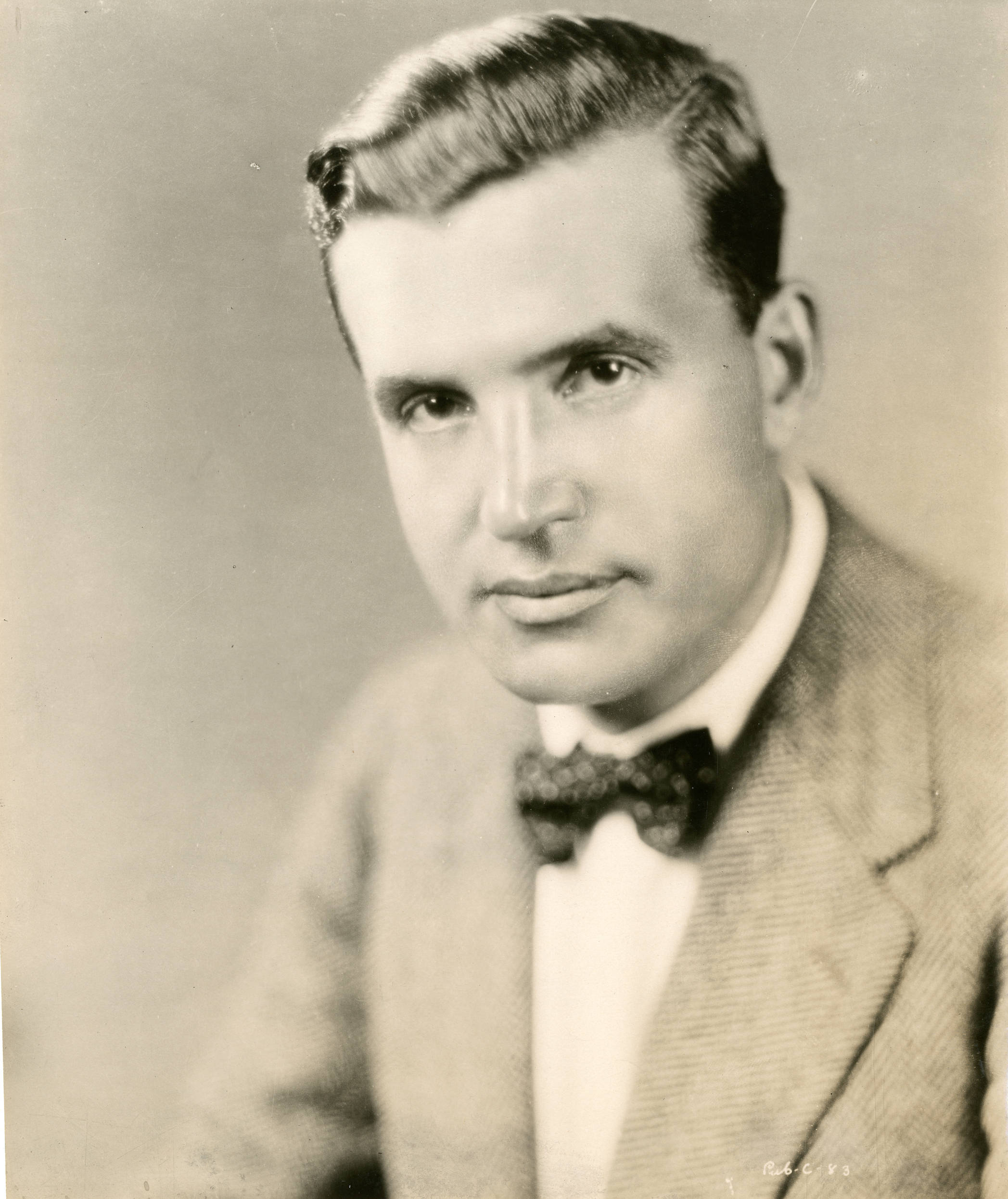
- Fellowes in 1923
- Born: Rockliffe St. Patrick Fellowes; 17 March 1884; Ottawa, Ontario, Canada
- Died: 28 January 1950 (aged 66); Los Angeles, California, U.S.
- Resting place: Beechwood Cemetery
- Years active: 1907–1934
- Spouse: Lucile Watson (1903 -?)

Rockliffe St Patrick Fellowes (17 March 1884 – 28 January 1950) was a Canadian stage and film actor. He appeared in over 60 films and starred in films such as Regeneration (1915), Monkey Business, The Understanding Heart (1927) and The Crystal Cup (1927).

== Biography ==
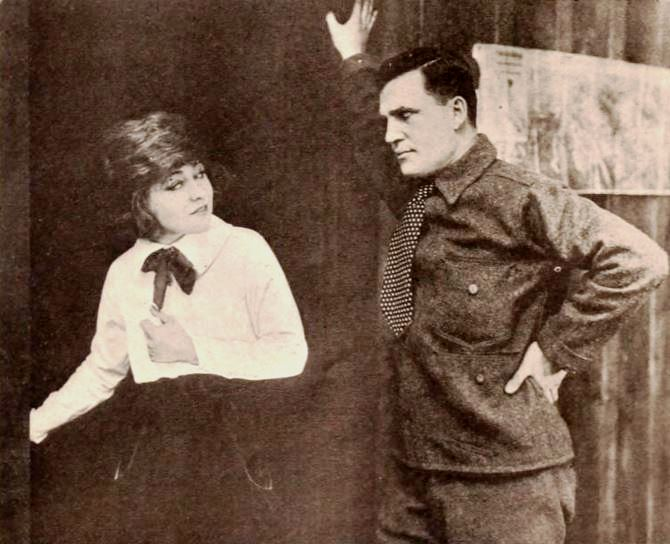
Ethel Clayton and Fellowes in The Man Hunt (1918)

Rockliffe St Patrick Fellowes was born in the village of New Edinburgh, Ontario, (now part of Ottawa, Ontario) Canada on St Patrick's Day, 1884. He was the son of Mr. and Mrs. Rockliffe Fellowes, and he had three brothers. His grandfather was a Member of Parliament in the Canada House of Commons.

At age 19, Fellowes married Canadian actress Lucile Watson, and moved to New York City, where she was already an established stage actress. After following a business career for some years, he gave it up to go onto the stage in 1907, with the assistance of Watson.

His first play was Brown of Harvard. He appeared in Within the Law, Under Cover, Her Sister among other plays, as a supporting actor for actors like Ethel Barrymore and Grace George. He appeared on New York City Broadway stages in several plays, including Love's Understudy in 1910, and the 1912 double bill of The Best People and The Gods of the Mountain which also had Watson in the cast. He toured with Robert Loraine's company and appeared in Man and Superman in Toronto in 1913.

A Broadway legend is attributed to Fellowes. A reputed cure for insomnia due to nightmares was to take a horse-drawn carriage ride in New York. A Broadway cast member bragged about being cured. Learning of this, Fellowes and other actors found the smallest horse in a local stable, took it by cab to the hotel where the reformed insomniac lived, and took the horse to the man's room and had the horse lie on the bed. The insomniac reputedly left town for Cuba after finding the horse.

Fellowes later made his entry into films as the redemptive hero of Raoul Walsh's 1915 silent gangster film Regeneration. He appeared in over 60 films, mostly silents, and may be best remembered today for his role as gangster Joe Helton in Monkey Business (1931) starring the Marx Brothers.

In 1918, Fellowes enlisted in the Canadian Army and fought in Siberia, where he became so ill he was hospitalized.

By 1928, Fellowes lived in Los Angeles, and Watson and Fellowes had divorced.

Fellowes retired from acting in 1934 after appearing in some westerns. He spent his retirement years teaching and writing. His final film was Rusty Rides Alone, which used five former leading men in its cast: Edmund Burns, Buffalo Bill Jr, Wheeler Oakman, and Wally Wales, along with Fellowes, in supporting parts.

Fellowes died on 28 January 1950 in Cedars of Lebanon Hospital of heart failure. He is interred in Beechwood Cemetery in Ottawa, not far from where he was born.

== Partial filmography ==
- Regeneration (1915)
- Where Love Leads (1916)
- The Bondage of Fear (1917)
- The Easiest Way (1917)
- Man's Woman (1917)
- The Web of Desire (1917)
- Friend Husband (1918)
- The Panther Woman (1918)
- The Wasp (1918)
- The Cup of Fury (1920)
- In Search of a Sinner (1920)
- Pagan Love (1920)
- The Point of View (1920)
- Yes or No ? (1920)
- Bits of Life (1921)
- The Price of Possession (1921)
- Island Wives (1922)
- The Strangers' Banquet (1922)
- Boy of Mine (1923)
- The Remittance Woman (1923)
- The Spoilers (1923)
- Trifling with Honor (1923)
- The Border Legion (1924)
- Borrowed Husbands (1924)
- Cornered (1924)
- Flapper Wives (1924)
- The Garden of Weeds (1924)
- Missing Daughters (1924)
- The Signal Tower (1924)
- Counsel for the Defense (1925)
- Déclassée (1925)
- East of Suez (1925)
- Rose of the World (1925)
- Without Mercy (1925)
- The Crystal Cup (1926)
- Honesty – The Best Policy (1926)
- The Road to Glory (1926)
- Rocking Moon(1926)
- Silence (1926)
- Syncopating Sue (1926)
- The Third Degree (1926)
- The Satin Woman (1927)
- The Taxi Dancer (1927)
- The Understanding Heart (1927)
- The Charlatan (1929)
- Outside the Law (1930)
- Ladies of the Big House (1931)
- Monkey Business (1931)
- The Vice Squad (1931)
- 20,000 Years in Sing Sing (1932) unbilled
- The All American (1932)
- Hotel Continental (1932)
- Renegades of the West (1932)
- Back Page (1933)
- The Phantom Broadcast (1933)
- Rusty Rides Alone (1933)
