= Dollars and the Woman (1916) =

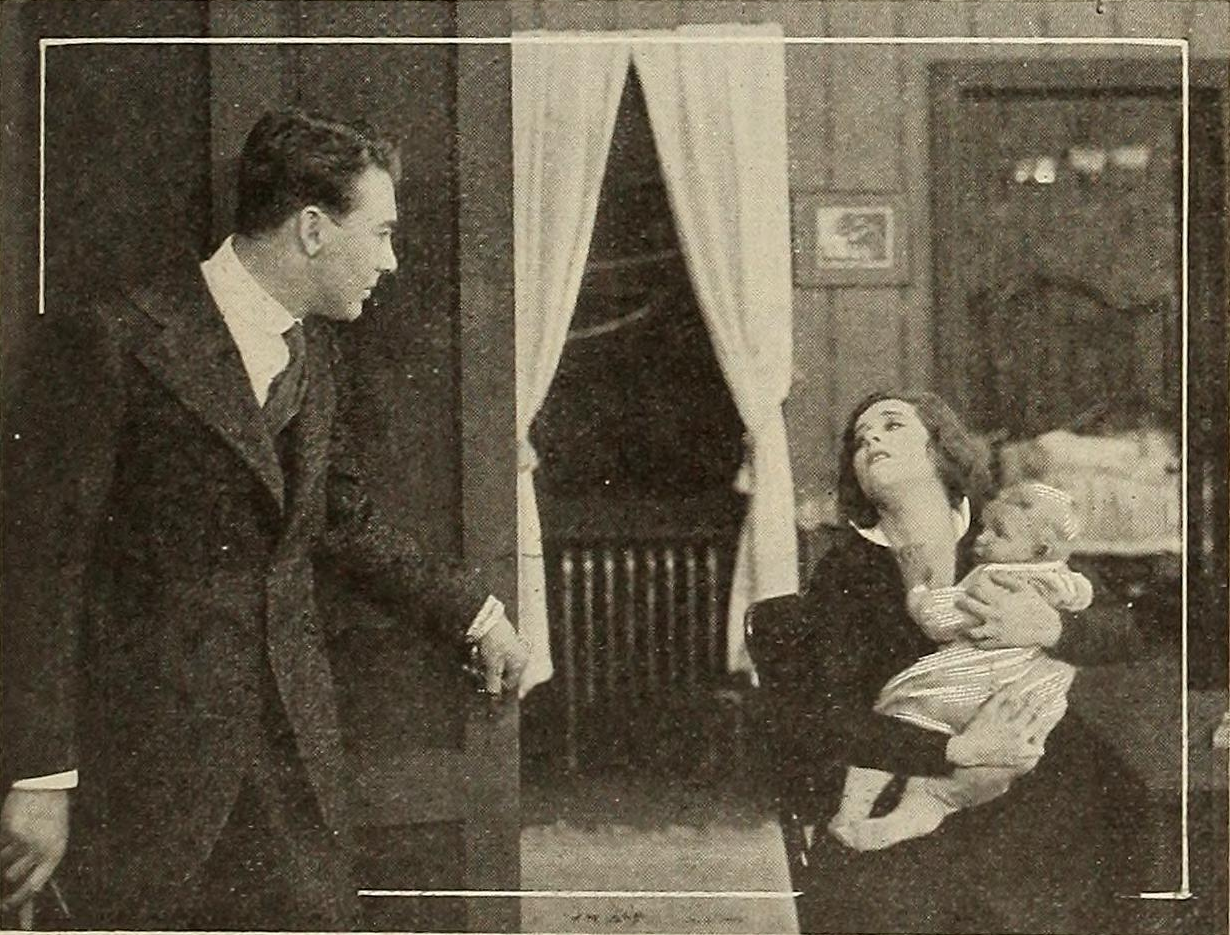
- Tom Moore and Ethel Clayton
- Directed by: Joseph Kaufman
- Screenplay by: Mark Swan
- Based on: Dollars and Cents by Albert Payson Terhune
- Starring: Tom Moore; Ethel Clayton
- Cinematography: Louis H. Dunmyre
- Production company: Lubin Manufacturing Company
- Distributed by: V-L-S-E, Inc.
- Release date: March 20, 1916
- Running time: 6 reels
- Country: USA
- Language: Silent (English intertitles)

Dollars and the Woman is a lost 1916 American silent drama film directed by Joseph Kaufman, based on Albert Payson Terhune's novel Dollars and Cents. The film was produced by Lubin Manufacturing Co. and distributed by V-L-S-E. It was Joseph Kaufman's last film he directed for Lubin before he left for Famous Players.

== Plot ==
Since they were children, Dan Hilyer and Arthur Crewe had competed for the affections of Madge Boynton, one being an inventor and the other being a child of wealth. They both propose to Madge and she accepts Hilyer's proposal, to the distress of Crewe. He sells one of his mining equipment patents for $7,000, and the newlyweds begin to enjoy a lavish lifestyle, until the money runs dry. Madge's father has died recently and it is discovered that he left almost nothing to her, and she soon discovers that she has become pregnant. Her husband picks up a job at the Scientific Review until his next invention sells, which turns out to be several months, and they live in poverty.

A copper magnate invites Hilyer to dinner, and he is told that in order to sell his copper smelting invention he must travel to San Francisco. Madge withdraws all of their savings for his travel expenses and puts it in her purse, and while on her way home, the purse-strings are cut and the money stolen. Desperate to support her husband, she turns to Arthur Crewe for a loan of $250. After misinterpreting her method of repayment as her offering himself, he is insulted but reluctantly loans the money to her, and she doesn't tell her husband that she lost the money in the first place. Her husband leaves town and Madge is left at home, where Crewe pays her a visit to apologize. He finds her collapsed on the floor and telephones the hospital, where he pays for her stay in a private room.

She recovers well after having her son and returns home to find that it has been well stocked with food and money. Meanwhile, her husband has been refused by the copper magnate and he takes up a position at a hotel as a porter, where he encounters a helpful engineer who convinces the magnate to purchase the smelter. He becomes a rich man, but in the time since he had seen Madge last, she has become fanatical about saving, which leads them to argue over purchasing new housing and items. Hilyer learns of Crewe's financial assistance and accuses Madge of infidelity, whereupon the next day she is packing to leave the flat. Crewe arrives, and hearing of their separation, offers to marry her once she is free. Hiyler discovers them and he is set straight about their correspondence, and recommits himself to his wife, leaving Crewe to step out alone.

== Cast ==
- Tom Moore as Dan Hilyer
- Ethel Clayton as Madge Hilyer
- Crauford Kent as Arthur Crewe
- Bartley McCullum as General Boynton
- Herbert Fortier as Colonel Bernard

== Production ==
Production began in November 1915, and the sets were designed by Allen Farnham and constructed at Lubin's No. 3 plant on Glenwood Ave and 16th St. in Philadelphia. The first set filmed on was a massive French ballroom, where 750 extras would be dancing.

== Reception ==
Motion Picture News reviewer Peter Milne called the film "truly extraordinary" for its characterizations, though complained that the film should have been trimmed down from six reels to five.

Motography reviewer George W. Graves gave the film a very positive review, praising the pacing and performances of the film.

Wid's Films and Film Folk's review was glowing, calling it "one of the best presentations of life as it really is that has ever been offered." The reviewer praised the film for its performances and characterizations, and described the film as "truly great" despite its "elementary" story.

== Censorship ==
As was common until the late 1960s, Dollars and the Woman was required to be screened by various city and state censorship boards before it could be exhibited. It was viewed by the Pennsylvania State Board of Censors and banned with no explanation, and they were subsequently taken to the Pennsylvania court of common pleas in Philadelphia by V-L-S-E. The judges found no issue with the content of the film and stated that the censor board "abused its discretion and acted arbitrarily and oppressively." The censors were willing to exhibit the film, if V-L-S-E made various eliminations to the film related to depiction of pregnancy, hospitals, and suggestion of an "immoral idea".

== Preservation ==
With no holdings located in archives, Dollars and the Woman is considered a lost film.
