= Roman Candles (1920 film) =

1920 film

Roman Candles (aka: Yankee Doodle, Jr.)
- Directed by: Jack Pratt
- Written by: W.S. Forstyth (story); Jack Pratt (co-scen.); W.S. Forsyth (co-scen.); Ralph Spence (titles)
- Produced by: Master Pictures
- Starring: J. Frank Glendon; Edward M. Kimball
- Cinematography: William Beckley
- Distributed by: State's Rights; 1920; Burnside; Mar-Apr 1922 (as Yankee Doodle, Jr.); Cinart July 4, 1922 (as Yankee Doodle, Jr.)
- Release date: September 13, 1920
- Running time: 7 reels in 1920; 5 reels both 1922 rereleases
- Country: United States
- Language: Silent..English titles

Roman Candles is a 1920 silent comedy-drama film directed by Jack Pratt and starring J. Frank Glendon and Edward M. Kimball. The film was released in 1920 as a seven reeler on State's Rights basis. In 1922 two independent distributors rereleased it with a 5 reel running length.

It is preserved in the Library of Congress and the BFI Film and TV Institute, London.

== Cast ==
- J. Frank Glendon as John Arnold, Jr.
- Phalba Morgan as Senorita Zorra Gamorra
- Edward M. Kimball as John Arnold, Sr.
- Hector V. Sarno as The President
- Sidney D'Albrook as The Secret Service Chief
- Jack Pratt as Mendoza, The Captain
- Mechtilde Price
- Lola Smith
- Bill Conant
- Jack Waltemeyer
- Teddy as A Dog

== See also ==
- List of early color feature films
