= The Price of Possession =

1921 film

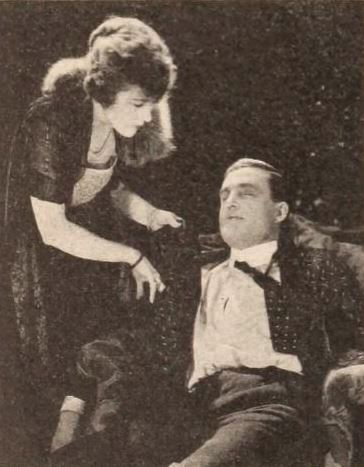
- Still from a magazine
- Directed by: Hugh Ford
- Written by: Winifred Boggs (story); Eve Unsell (scenario)
- Produced by: Jesse L. Lasky
- Cinematography: George J. Folsey
- Distributed by: Paramount Pictures
- Release date: February 27, 1921 (U.S.)
- Running time: 50 minutes; 5 reels
- Country: United States
- Language: Silent (English intertitles)

The Price of Possession is a lost 1921 American silent romantic drama film directed by Hugh Ford and starring Ethel Clayton. It was produced by Jesse L. Lasky.

== Cast ==
- Ethel Clayton as Helen Carston
- Rockliffe Fellowes as Jim Barston, A Bushrider / Jim Barston, Heir to Barston Manor
- Maude Turner Gordon as Lady Dawnay
- Reginald Denny as Robert Dawnay
- Clarence Heritage as Lord Dawnay
- George Backus as Samuel Poore
- Isabel West as Mrs. Poore
- Pearl Shepard as Eva Poore
- Dorothy Hall as Minister's Daughter
