= The World's Great Snare =

1916 film by Joseph Kaufman

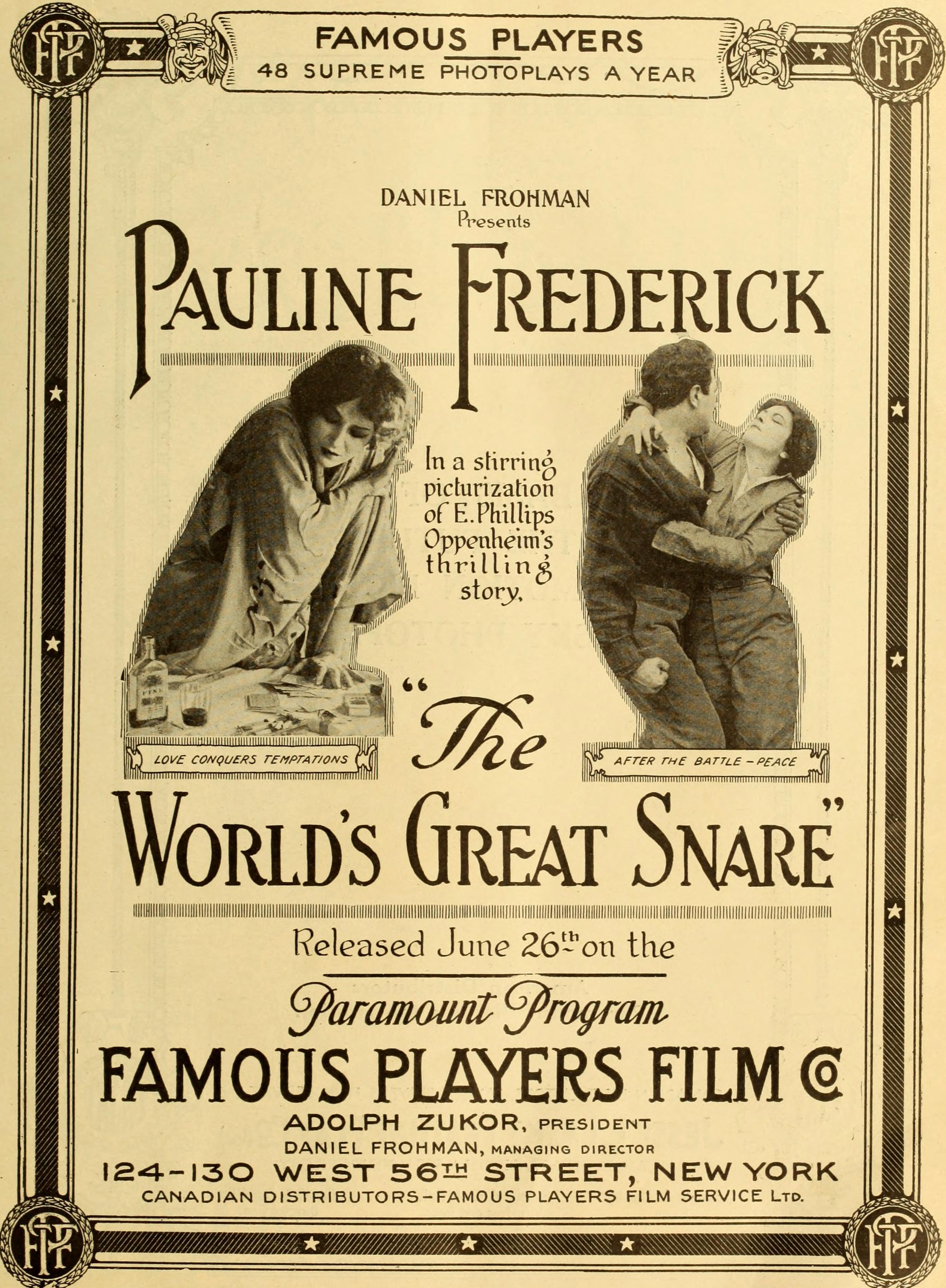
- Directed by: Joseph Kaufman
- Based on: The World's Great Snare by E. Phillips Oppenheim
- Produced by: Adolph Zukor
- Starring: Pauline Frederick; Irving Cummings
- Cinematography: Edward Gheller
- Distributed by: Paramount Pictures
- Release date: June 25, 1916
- Running time: 50 minutes
- Country: United States
- Language: Silent (English intertitles)

The World's Great Snare is a 1916 American silent drama film produced by Adolph Zukor's Famous Players Film Company and distributed through Paramount Pictures. The film is based on a 1900 novel of the same name by E. Phillips Oppenheim and was directed by Joseph Kaufman. The film stars Pauline Frederick, a noted stage actress, and Irving Cummings, later a director, is the male lead.

== Cast ==
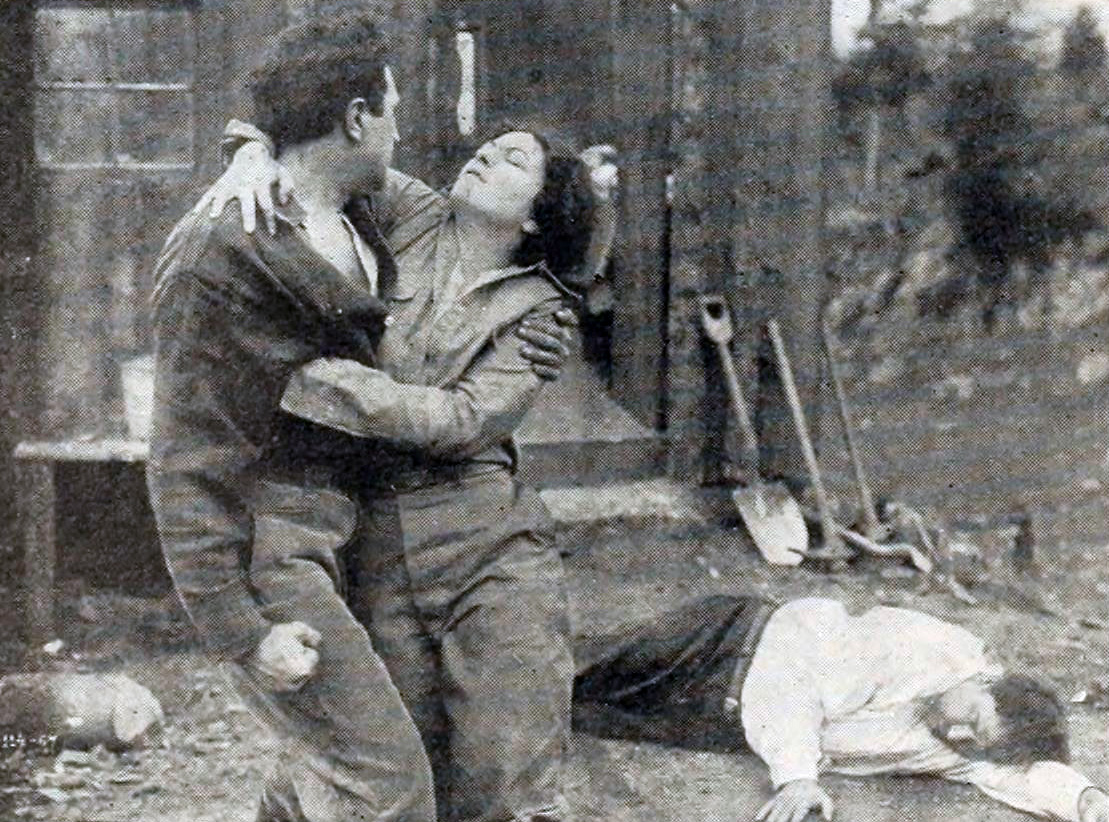
Film still

- Pauline Frederick as Myra
- Irving Cummings as Byran
- Ferdinand Tidmarsh as Huntley
- Frank Evans as Pete
- Riley Hatch as Almes Rutten
- Buckley Starkey as Skein

== Preservation ==
The World's Great Snare is currently presumed lost. In February of 2021, the film was cited by the National Film Preservation Board on their Lost U.S. Silent Feature Films list.

== See also ==
- List of lost films
