= The Feast of Life =

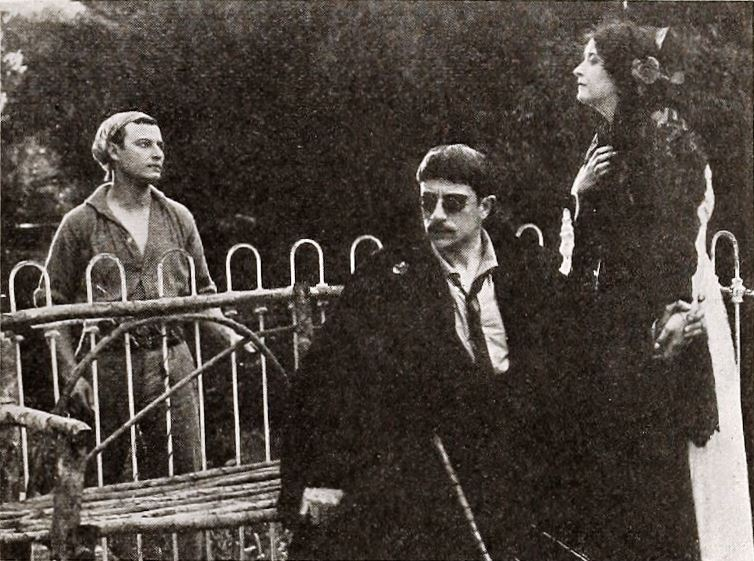
- Still with Robert Frazer, Paul Capellani, and Clara Kimball Young
- Directed by: Albert Capellani
- Written by: Frances Marion (story & scenario)
- Produced by: Paragon Films Inc.
- Starring: Clara Kimball Young
- Cinematography: Lucien Andriot
- Distributed by: World Film Company
- Release date: May 1, 1916
- Running time: 5 reels
- Country: United States
- Language: Silent (English intertitles)

The Feast of Life is a 1916 American silent drama film directed by Albert Capellani and starring Clara Kimball Young. It was distributed by the World Film Company.

== Cast ==
- Clara Kimball Young as Aurora Fernandez
- Mrs. E.M. Kimball as Senora Fernandez (credited as Pauline Kimball)
- Edward Kimball as Father Venture
- Paul Capellani as Don Armada
- Doris Kenyon as Celida
- Robert Frazer as Pedro

== Production ==
Portions of the film were shot in Cuba.

== Preservation status ==
The Library of Congress website does not list any film archives as holding a copy of The Feast of Life. However, the Greta de Groats Clara Kimball Young webpage states that a copy of the film is held at the Národní Filmový Archiv, Czech Republic.
