= Ned Van Buren =

American cinematographer

- Born: Ned Madison Van Buren; August 27, 1882; Gouverneur, New York, USA
- Died: April 4, 1969 (aged 86); Los Angeles, California, USA
- Spouse: Alice Brown (m. 1908)

Ned Van Buren (1882-1969) was an early American cinematographer who worked in Hollywood during the silent era. He was a member of the American Society of Cinematographers, having been elected in 1923.

== Biography ==
As a young man, Ned began working as a photographer in his hometown of Gouverneur, New York. In 1912, he got his hands on a movie camera and started experimenting with shooting local scenes before gaining work as a cinematographer in the silent movie business; for a time, he was Pauline Frederick's chief cinematographer. He filmed many projects for Famous Players–Lasky, Edison, and Universal—likely many more than the 40 he is officially credited with. Eventually he left cinematography behind to work for Kodak in Hollywood.

== Selected filmography ==
- Counsel for the Defense (1925)
- When a Man's a Man (1924)
- Stranger of the North (1923)
- The Old Fool (1923)
- Has the World Gone Mad! (1923)
- The Headless Horseman (1922)
- Annabelle Lee (1921)
- Burn 'Em Up Barnes (1921)
- The Sin That Was His (1920)
- The Bandbox (1919)
- A Broadway Saint (1919)
- The Kingdom of Youth (1918)
- Friend Husband (1918)
- Madame Jealousy (1918)
- Mrs. Dane's Defense (1918)
- The Hungry Heart (1917)
- Double Crossed (1917)
- Her Better Self (1917)
- Sleeping Fires (1917)
- Sapho (1917)
- The Slave Market (1917)
- Nanette of the Wilds (1916)
- Ashes of Embers (1916)
- The Woman in the Case (1916)
- Susie Snowflake (1916)
- Saints and Sinners (1916)
- Out of the Drifts (1916)
- Children of Eve (1915)
- Gladiola (1915)
- The Alien (1915)
