= Ashes of Embers =

1916 film

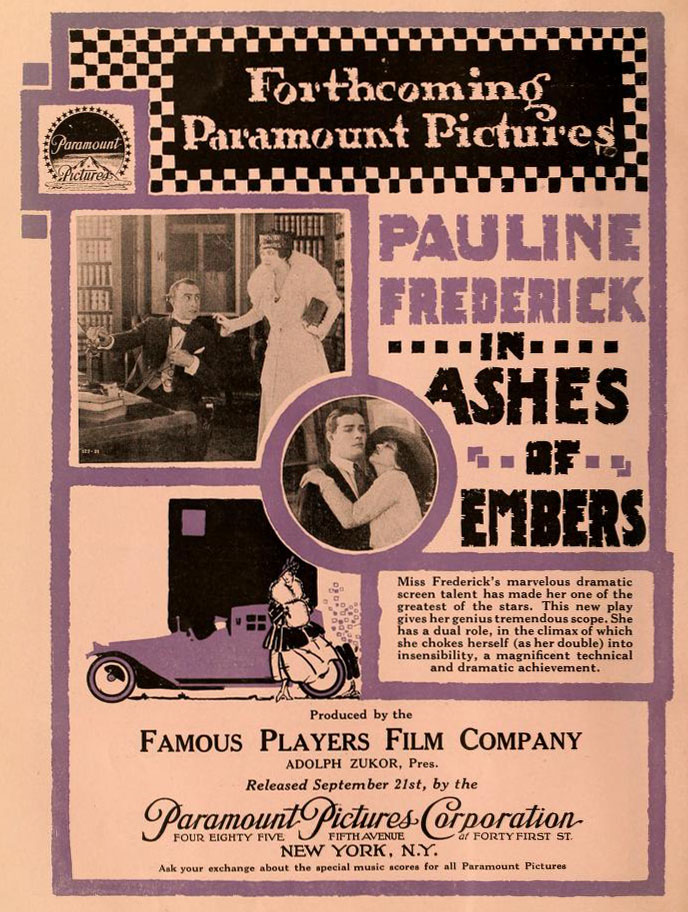
- Paramount Pictures advertisement
- Directed by: Joseph Kaufman; Edward José
- Written by: John B. Clymer (adaptation); Charles A. Logue (adaptation); Forrest Halsey (scenario)
- Produced by: Adolph Zukor
- Cinematography: Ned Van Buren
- Distributed by: Paramount Pictures
- Release date: September 21, 1916
- Running time: 50 minutes (5 reels)
- Country: United States
- Language: Silent (English intertitles)

Ashes of Embers is a 1916 American silent drama film directed by Joseph Kaufman and Edward José. It was produced by Famous Players Film Company and distributed by Paramount Pictures. Pauline Frederick is the star of the picture playing a dual role of twin sisters.

The film opened at the Broadway Theatre in New York City, playing with the Charlie Chaplin short The Pawnshop. Ashes of Embers was also the debut film for the short-lived Theater St. Francis, across the street from the St. Francis Hotel in San Francisco, CA.

== Cast ==
- Pauline Frederick as Laura Ward / Agnes Ward
- Earle Foxe as Richard Leigh
- Frank Losee as William Benedict
- J. Herbert Frank as Daniel Marvin
- Maggie Halloway Fisher as Mrs. Ward
- Jay Wilson as Detective

== Preservation ==
Ashes of Embers is currently presumed lost. In February 2021, the film was cited by the National Film Preservation Board on their Lost U.S. Silent Feature Films list.
