= The Sin That Was His =

1920 film by Hobart Henley

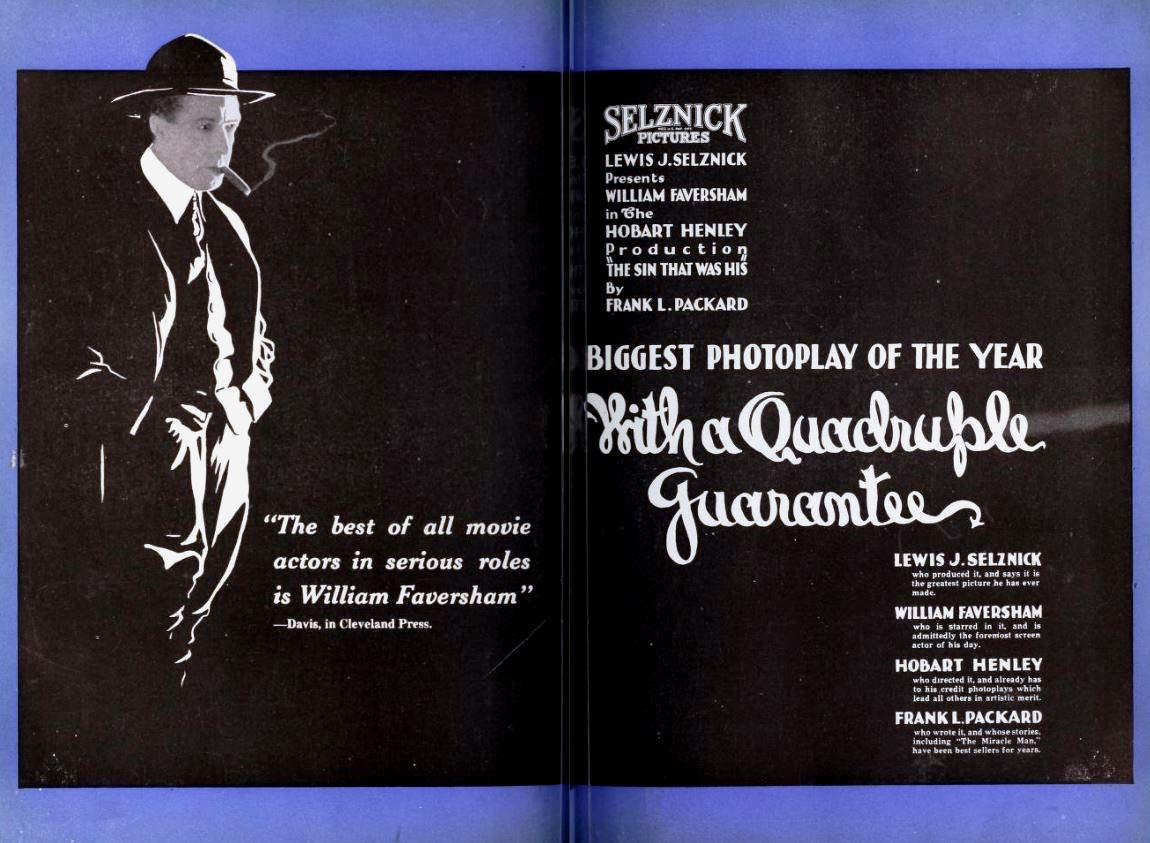
- advertisement
- Directed by: Hobart Henley
- Written by: Edmund Goulding
- Based on: the novel The Sin That Was His by Frank Lucius Packard
- Produced by: Lewis J. Selznick
- Starring: William Faversham
- Cinematography: Ned Van Buren
- Production company: Selznick Pictures
- Distributed by: Select Pictures
- Release date: December 1920
- Running time: 6 reels
- Country: United States
- Language: Silent..English titles

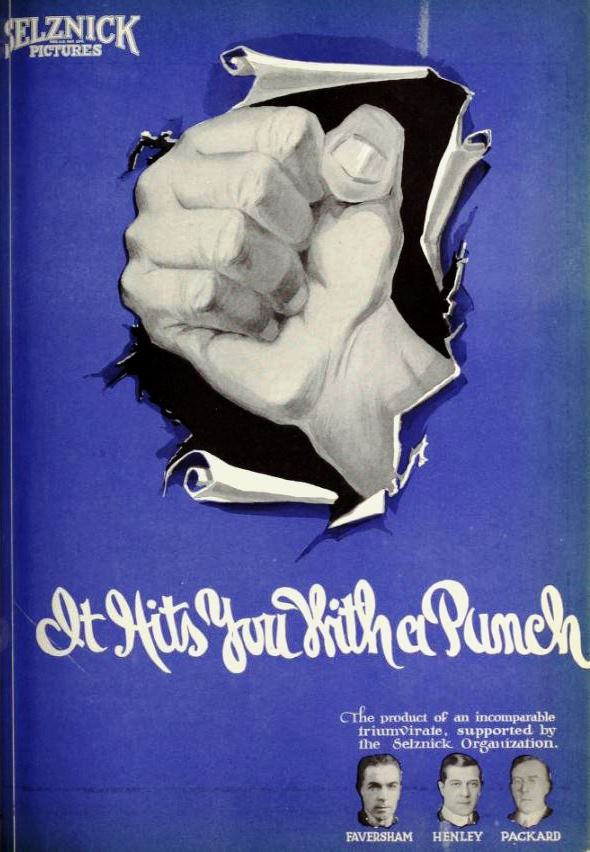
advert poster.

The Sin That Was His is a 1920 silent film drama directed by Hobart Henley and starring William Faversham. It was produced by Selznick Pictures and released through Select Pictures.

== Cast ==
- William Faversham - Raymond Chapelle
- Lucy Cotton - Valerie Lafleur
- Pedro de Cordoba - Father Aubert
- Miss Sherman - Madam Lafleur
- Lule Warrenton - Madam Blondin
- Robert Conville - Blondin
- John Barton - Bishop

== Preservation ==
In February 2021, The Sin That Was His was cited by the National Film Preservation Board on their Lost U.S. Silent Feature Films list and is therefore presumed lost.
