= Edward Kimball =

American actor (1859–1938)

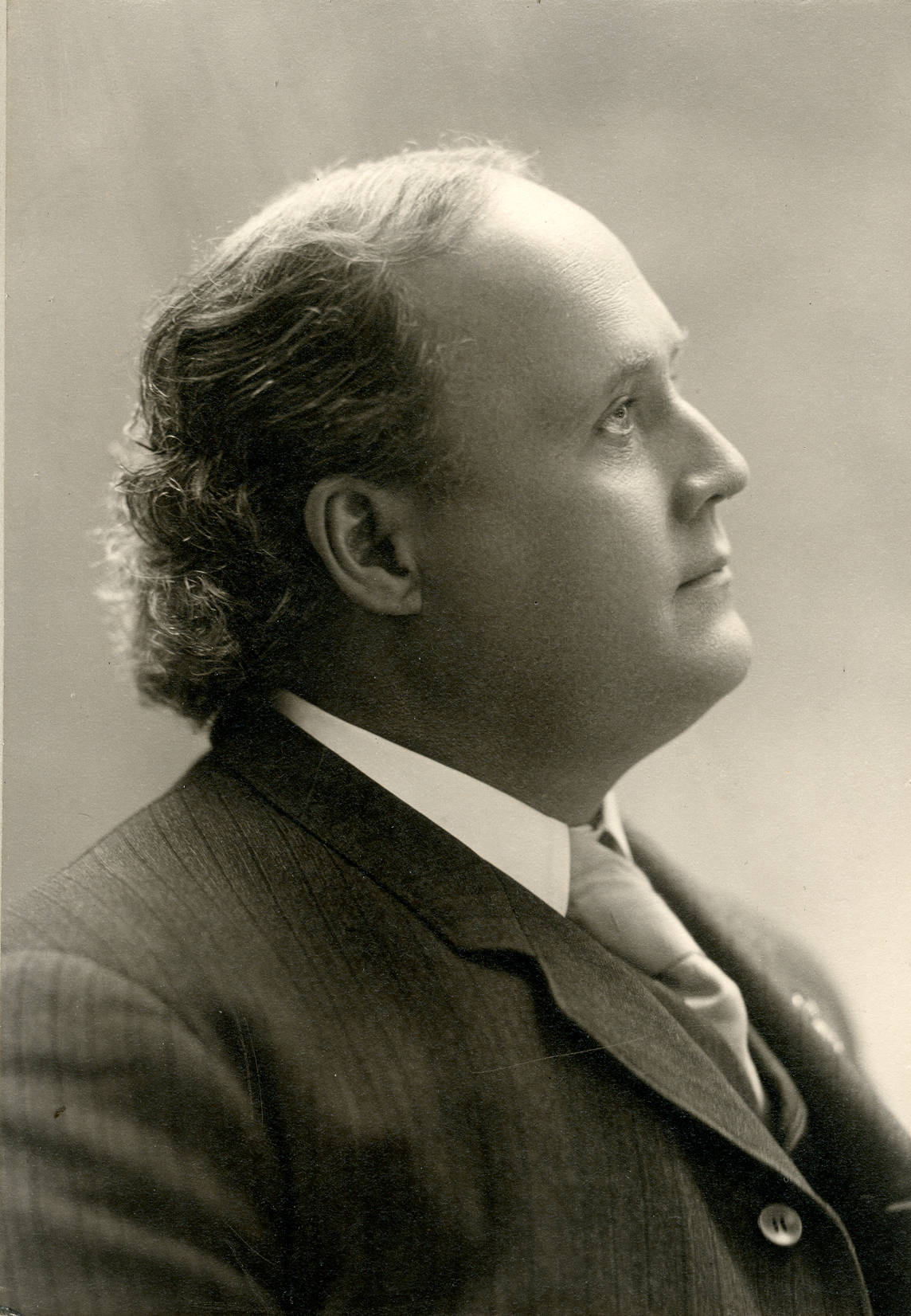
- Kimball in 1906
- Born: Edward Marshall Kimball; June 26, 1859; Keokuk, Iowa, U.S.
- Died: January 4, 1938 (aged 78); Hollywood, California, U.S.
- Other names: Edward M. Kimball; E. M. Kimball
- Occupation: Actor
- Years active: 1912–1936
- Spouse: Pauline Garrette Kimball (died 1919)
- Children: Clara Kimball Young

Edward Marshall Kimball (June 26, 1859 – January 4, 1938) was an American actor of the silent era. He appeared in more than 60 films between 1912 and 1936. Like many older actors of the Victorian and Edwardian eras, he enjoyed a varied stage career on and off Broadway before entering the silent films.

Kimball was born in Keokuk, Iowa, and died in Hollywood, California. He was the father of actress Clara Kimball Young in whose films he sometimes appeared.

== Partial filmography ==
- Martha's Rebellion (1912, Short) – Dr. Goodwill
- The Awakening of Jones (1912, Short) – (as Edward M. Kimball)
- A Vitagraph Romance (1912, Short) – Senator Carter of Montana
- The Delayed Letter (1913) – Mabel's Father
- The Little Minister (1913, Short) – Elder of the Church (as Edward M. Kimball)
- The Only Way (1913, Short)
- The Cure (1913, Short) – Dr. Phillips
- The Christian (1914) – Lord Storm
- Memories That Haunt (1914, Short) – Isobel's Father (as Edward M. Kimball)
- The Spirit and the Clay (1914, Short) – Galton
- The Awakening of Barbara Dare (1914, Short)
- The Crime of Cain (1914, Short) – Judge Stone
- The Gang (1914, Short) (AKA The Reformation of the Gang (USA))
- The House on the Hill (1914, Short) – Jeptha Newcomb
- Lily of the Valley (1914, Short) – Old Kemble – Lily's Father (as Edward M. Kimball)
- Lola (1914) (AKA Without A Soul (USA: Reissue Title)) – Dr. Crossett (Edward M. Kimball)
- The Deep Purple (1915) – Reverend William Moore
- The Little Miss Brown (1915) – Justin Glenton (Edward M. Kimball)
- Marrying Money (1915) (AKA Marriage a la Carte (USA: Reissue Title)) – Lyman Niles
- The Impostor (1915) (AKA The Impostors (copyright title)) – Mr. Priestley
- The Little Mademoiselle (1915) – Mr. Pemberton
- Camille (1915) – The Doctor (as Edward M. Kimball)
- The Yellow Passport (1916) (AKA The Badge of Shame (USA: Reissue Title)) – David Sokoloff
- Love's Crucible (1916, Short) – Mr. Dymsley (as Ed M. Kimball)
- A Woman's Power (1916) – MacAllister Falkins (as E.M. Kimball)
- The Feast of Life (1916) – Father Venture
- Tangled Fates (1916) (AKA The Grubstaker) – Mr. Lawson
- Miss Petticoats (1916) – Captain Joel Stewart (as Edward M. Kimball)
- A Woman's Way (1916) – John Livingston (as Ed M. Kimball)
- The Common Law (1916) – Mr. Neville (as Edward M. Kimball)
- The Hidden Scar (1916) (AKA The Scorching Way) – Reverend James Overton
- A Woman Alone (1917) (AKA Loneliness) – Rufus Waldron
- The Bondage of Fear (1917) – Dr. Jason Wheatley (as Edward M. Kimball)
- The Web of Desire (1917) – Thomas Hurd (as Edward M. Kimball)
- Man's Woman (1917) – Jimmy Regan
- The Mad Lover (1917) (AKA A Modern Othello (USA), The Lash of Jealousy (USA), The Shadow of the Night (USA)) – the Pastor
- Magda (1917) – (as Edward M. Kimball)
- The Marionettes (1918) – Professor De Ferney (as Edward M. Kimball)
- The House of Glass (1918) – Lawyer McClellan
- The Accidental Honeymoon (1918) – Roland Edwards
- The Claw (1918) – the Postmaster (as E.M. Kimball)
- The Savage Woman (1918) – Jacques Benoit (as Edward M. Kimball)
- The Road Through the Dark (1918) – Father Alphonse (Edward M. Kimball)
- A Son of Strife (1918) – Count Andre Vaskova
- The Better Wife (1919) – Mr. Page
- Eyes of Youth (1919)
- For the Soul of Rafael (1920) – Ricardo (as Edward M. Kimball)
- Mid-Channel (1920) – Honorable Peter Mottram (as Edward M. Kimball)
- Roman Candles (1920) (a.k.a. Yankee Doodle Jr.) – John Arnold Sr. (as Edward M. Kimball)
- Silk Husbands and Calico Wives (1920) – Jerome Appleby
- Boys Will Be Boys (1921) – Judge Priest
- An Unwilling Hero (1921) – Lovejoy
- Charge It (1921) – Tom Garreth (as Edward M. Kimball)
- What No Man Knows (1921) – Dr. Ralph Cummings
- The Masquerader (1922) – Brock (as Edward M. Kimball)
- Omar the Tentmaker (1922) – Omar's Father (as Edward M. Kimball)
- The Woman of Bronze (1923) – Papa Bonelli
- The Remittance Woman (1923) – Anthony Campbell
- Trilby (1923) – Impresario
- The Cheat (1923) – Judge
- Passion's Pathway (1924) – John Deering
- I'll Show You the Town (1925) – Professor Carlyle McCabe
- Modern Times (1936) – Doctor (uncredited)
