= The Understanding Heart =

1927 film

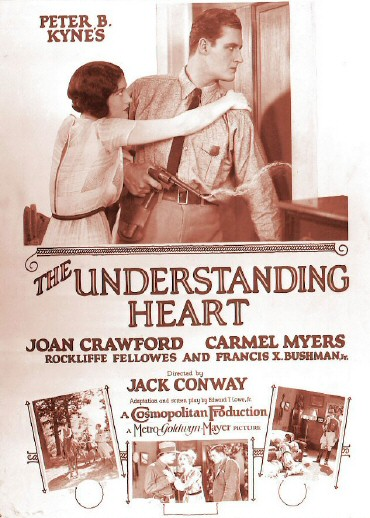
- Directed by: Jack Conway
- Written by: Joseph Farnham (titles)
- Screenplay by: Edward T. Lowe, Jr.
- Based on: The Understanding Heart by Peter B. Kyne
- Starring: Joan Crawford; Rockliffe Fellowes; Francis X. Bushman Jr. Carmel Myers
- Cinematography: John Arnold
- Edited by: John English
- Production company: Cosmopolitan Productions
- Distributed by: Metro-Goldwyn-Mayer
- Release date: February 26, 1927
- Running time: 67 minutes
- Country: United States
- Languages: Silent; English intertitles

The Understanding Heart is a 1927 American silent adventure drama film directed by Jack Conway and stars Joan Crawford in an early leading role. The film was adapted for the screen by Edward T. Lowe Jr. from the novel of the same name by Peter B. Kyne.

== Plot ==
Forest ranger Bob Mason kills a man in self-defense. Kelcey Dale, to whom Bob is attracted, commits perjury and causes him to be convicted for murder. Bob escapes and is sheltered by Kelcey's sister, Monica Dale.

== Cast ==
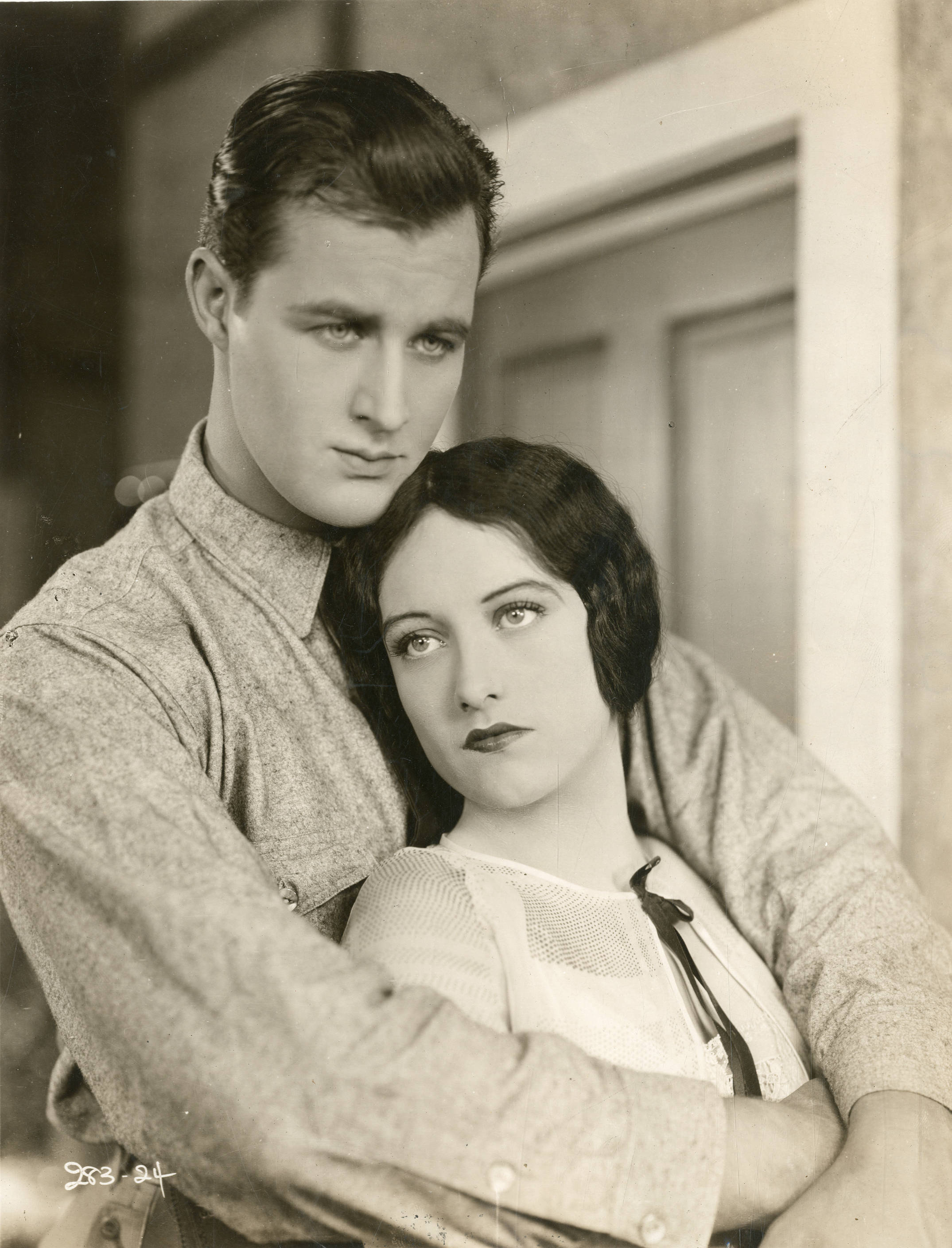
Francis X. Bushman Jr. and Joan Crawford in The Understanding Heart

- Joan Crawford - Monica Dale
- Rockliffe Fellowes - Bob Mason
- Ralph Bushman - Tony Garland
- Carmel Myers - Kelcey Dale
- Richard Carle - Sheriff Bentley
- Jerry Miley - Bardwell
- Harvey Clark - Uncle Charlie

== Preservation status ==
- A print was preserved by the MGM Studios.

== Production notes ==
The Understanding Heart features footage of fires used in the 1926 film The Fire Brigade.
