= For the Defense (1922 film) =

1922 film by Paul Powell

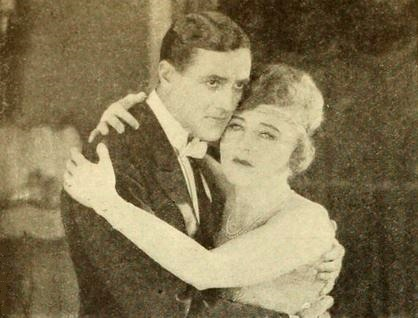
- Vernon Steele and Ethel Clayton
- Directed by: Paul Powell
- Written by: Beulah Marie Dix
- Based on: For the Defense by Elmer Rice
- Produced by: Adolph Zukor; Jesse Lasky
- Starring: Ethel Clayton; ZaSu Pitts
- Cinematography: Hal Rosson
- Distributed by: Paramount Pictures
- Release date: June 4, 1922
- Running time: 50 minutes; 5 reels
- Country: United States
- Language: Silent (English intertitles)

For the Defense is a 1922 American silent mystery film produced by Famous Players–Lasky and distributed by Paramount Pictures. It is based on the 1919 Broadway play, For the Defense, by Elmer Rice. Ethel Clayton is the star of the film. Considered to be a lost film for decades, a print was discovered in the Netherlands by the EYE Film Institute Netherlands (or Nederlands Filmmuseum).

== Cast ==
- Ethel Clayton as Anne Woodstock
- Vernon Steele as Christopher Armstrong
- ZaSu Pitts as Jennie Dunn
- Bertram Grassby as Dr. Joseph Kasimir
- Mayme Kelso as Smith (credited as Maym Kelso)
- Sylvia Ashton as Signora Bartoni
- Mabel Van Buren as Cousin Selma
