= Nanette of the Wilds =

1916 film by Joseph Kaufman

- Directed by: Joseph Kaufman
- Screenplay by: Willard Mack
- Produced by: Jesse L. Lasky
- Starring: Pauline Frederick; Willard Mack; Macey Harlam; Charles Brandt; Frank Joyner; Daniel Pennell
- Cinematography: Ned Van Buren
- Production company: Famous Players Film Company
- Distributed by: Paramount Pictures
- Release date: November 26, 1916
- Running time: 50 minutes
- Country: United States
- Language: English

Nanette of the Wilds is a 1916 American drama silent film directed by Joseph Kaufman and written by Willard Mack. The film stars Pauline Frederick, Willard Mack, Macey Harlam, Charles Brandt, Frank Joyner and Daniel Pennell. The film was released on November 26, 1916, by Paramount Pictures.

The film premiered at the Strand Theatre in New York City in November 1916.

== Cast ==
- Pauline Frederick as Nanette Gauntier
- Willard Mack as Constable Thomas O'Brien
- Macey Harlam as Baptiste Flammant (*as Macey Harlan)
- Charles Brandt as Joe Gauntier
- Frank Joyner as Andy Joyce
- Daniel Pennell as Sergeant Major O'Hara
- Wallace MacDonald as Harry Jennings
- Jean Stewart as Marie Beaudeaut
- Robert Conville as Constable Jevne

== Preservation ==
Nanette of the Wilds is currently presumed lost. In February of 2021, the film was cited by the National Film Preservation Board on their Lost U.S. Silent Feature Films list.
