= The Hidden Scar =

1916 silent film by Barry O'Neil

The Hidden Scar (aka:The Scorching Way)
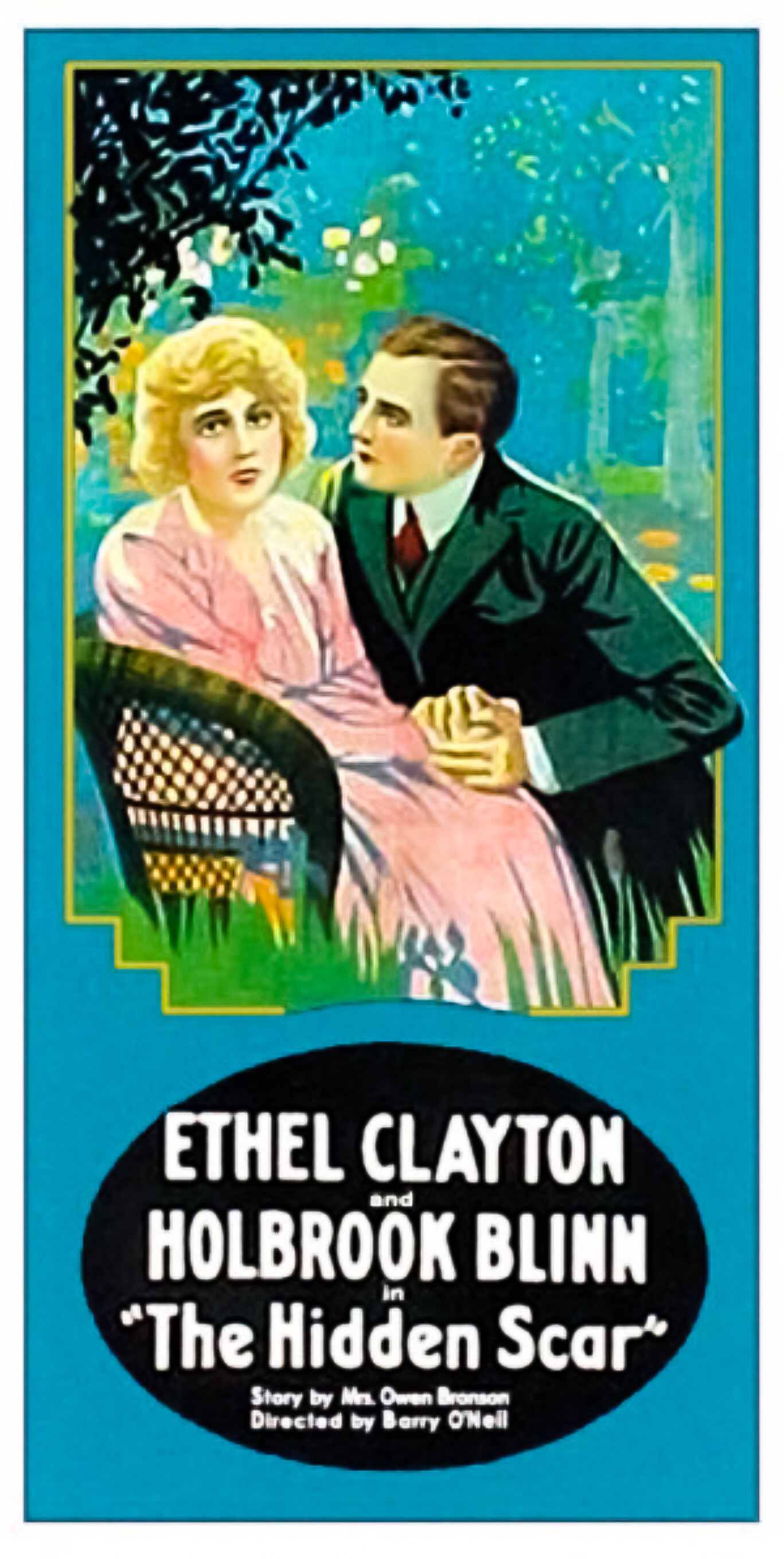
- Lobby poster
- Directed by: Barry O'Neil
- Written by: Frances Marion
- Based on: a story by Mrs. Owen Bronson
- Starring: Ethel Clayton
- Cinematography: Max Schneider
- Production company: Peerless Pictures Studios
- Distributed by: World Film Company
- Release date: October 16, 1916
- Running time: 5 reels
- Country: USA
- Language: Silent..English titles

The Hidden Scar is a 1916 American silent drama film directed by Barry O'Neil and starring Ethel Clayton and Holbrook Blinn. It was distributed by the World Film Company.

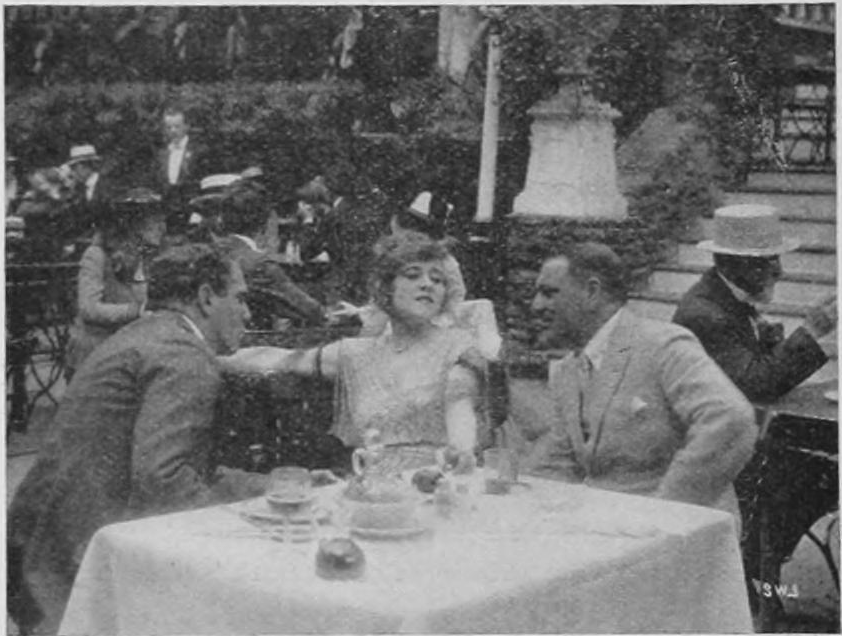
A scene from the film

== Plot ==
Janet Hall is a young girl who is seduced and wronged by Henry Dalton, and she gives birth to an illegitimate child. She makes a living dancing in a cabaret, which she despises, and dedicates herself to their child. She begs Dalton to marry her, to give their child a family name, but he refuses and offers her money instead. He is mortally wounded by ruffians and on his death-bed leaves her a cottage in the country and an annuity. There she meets and falls in love with the young minister of the local church named Dale Overton. Initially, she refuses to marry him on account of her distasteful past, but after hearing him preaches charity, forgiveness and tolerance, she agrees to get married. Later her husband learns of her unsavory past, and he renounces her. Stuart Doane, Overton's friend, comes to her defense, stating that he is a hypocrite, who preaches forgiveness but cannot accept his own wife's past. Overton's parents discourage him from associating with her, but overcomes their pressure and his own disgust and learns to forgive Janet. The strain put upon her by the situation causes her to become very ill, and Overton has an epiphany; charity and kindness are more important than all else. Janet awakes to both her husband and his parents kneeling at her bedside, who had all been praying for her recovery and they thank God that her life had been spared.

== Cast ==
- Ethel Clayton - Janet Hall
- Holbrook Blinn - Stuart Doane
- Irving Cummings - Dale Overton
- Montagu Love - Henry Dalton
- Madge Evans - Dot
- Edward Kimball - Reverend James Overton
- Eugenie Woodward - Mrs. Overton

== Reception ==
Motion Picture News reviewer Theodore Osborn Eltonhead found the film to contain "a good, tense, dramatic story, well produced, ably directed, and excellently acted."

New York Clipper gave the film a positive review, finding the film to be "not out of the ordinary" and "well handled."

Margaret I. MacDonald for Moving Picture World gave the film a mixed review, as she found the scenario to be "poorly constructed" and ended her review by saying "Much could be done to improve the action of this production which in its present shape carries too little significance."

== Preservation ==
An incomplete copy of the film is preserved at the Library of Congress in Washington D.C. and National Archives of Canada in Ottawa. Prints and/or fragments were found in the Dawson Film Find in 1978.
