= The Hungry Heart =

- Directed by: Robert G. Vignola
- Screenplay by: Charles Maigne
- Based on: The Hungry Heart by David Graham Phillips
- Starring: Pauline Frederick; Howard Hall; Robert Cain; Helen Lindroth; Eldean Steuart
- Cinematography: Ned Van Buren
- Production company: Famous Players Film Company
- Distributed by: Paramount Pictures
- Release date: November 5, 1917
- Running time: 50 minutes
- Country: United States
- Language: Silent (English intertitles)

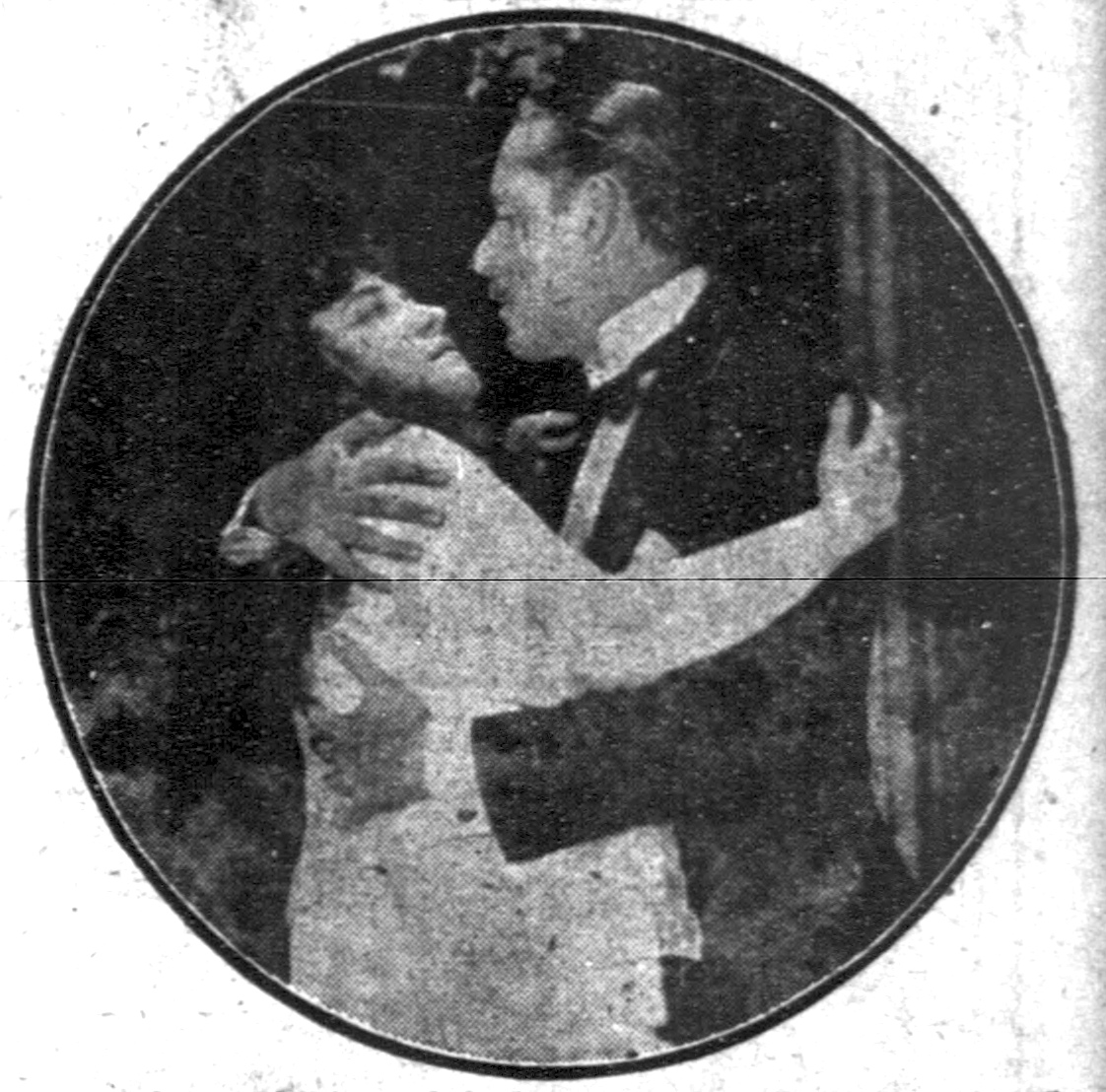
A contemporary newspaper publicity photograph.

The Hungry Heart is a 1917 American silent drama film directed by Robert G. Vignola and written by Charles Maigne based upon the novel of the same name by David Graham Phillips. The film stars Pauline Frederick, Howard Hall, Robert Cain, Helen Lindroth, and Eldean Steuart. The film was released on November 5, 1917, by Paramount Pictures.

== Plot ==
As described in a film magazine, Courtney Vaughan is very much in love with her husband Richard. However, when he neglects her for his chemistry work, she turns to Basil Gallatin, her husband's partner and a homewrecker. When Richard learns that Courtney desires her freedom he divorces her, giving her custody of their little son. After a separation of some time, Richard returns to the home and asks permission to use the laboratory. He asks Courtney to assist him, which she does. Basil, learning that Courtney is free, returns to her only to be turned away. He then goes to Richard and demands Courtney, but Courtney tells Richard to kill both her and Basil. Basil, frightened, runs away, and Courtney and Richard make arrangements to start life anew.

== Cast ==
- Pauline Frederick as Courtney Vaughan
- Howard Hall as Richard Vaughan
- Robert Cain as Basil Gallatin
- Helen Lindroth as Nanny
- Eldean Steuart as Winchie

== Reception ==
Like many American films of the time, The Hungry Heart was subject to cuts by city and state film censorship boards. The Chicago Board of Censors required cuts in reel 2 of the intertitle "My love, my love, I might have killed you", the woman embracing man on balcony and entire scene of man in woman's bedroom, in reel 4 the intertitles "Old Nanny's paralyzed. I found her yesterday morning in the hallway" and "You need not fear to confess that he took advantage of a weak moment", and in reel 5 the intertitles "I have no desire to punish, but Winchie and the world must never know", "If he finds us, he will kill us both", and "He has held me in his arms". After reinspection, the Chicago board required additional changes, after the closeup of Courtney on stairway and her husband has gone into Nanny's room, insert the intertitle "Convinced that the meddlesome Nanny has misunderstood their affection, Courtney thinks only of the safety of Gallatin" and eliminate the intertitles "It is true", "Where is he", and "There are times when a man must ignore or kill".

== Preservation ==
The Hungry Heart is currently presumed lost. In February of 2021, the film was cited by the National Film Preservation Board on their Lost U.S. Silent Feature Films list.
