= Out of the Drifts =

1916 film by J. Searle Dawley

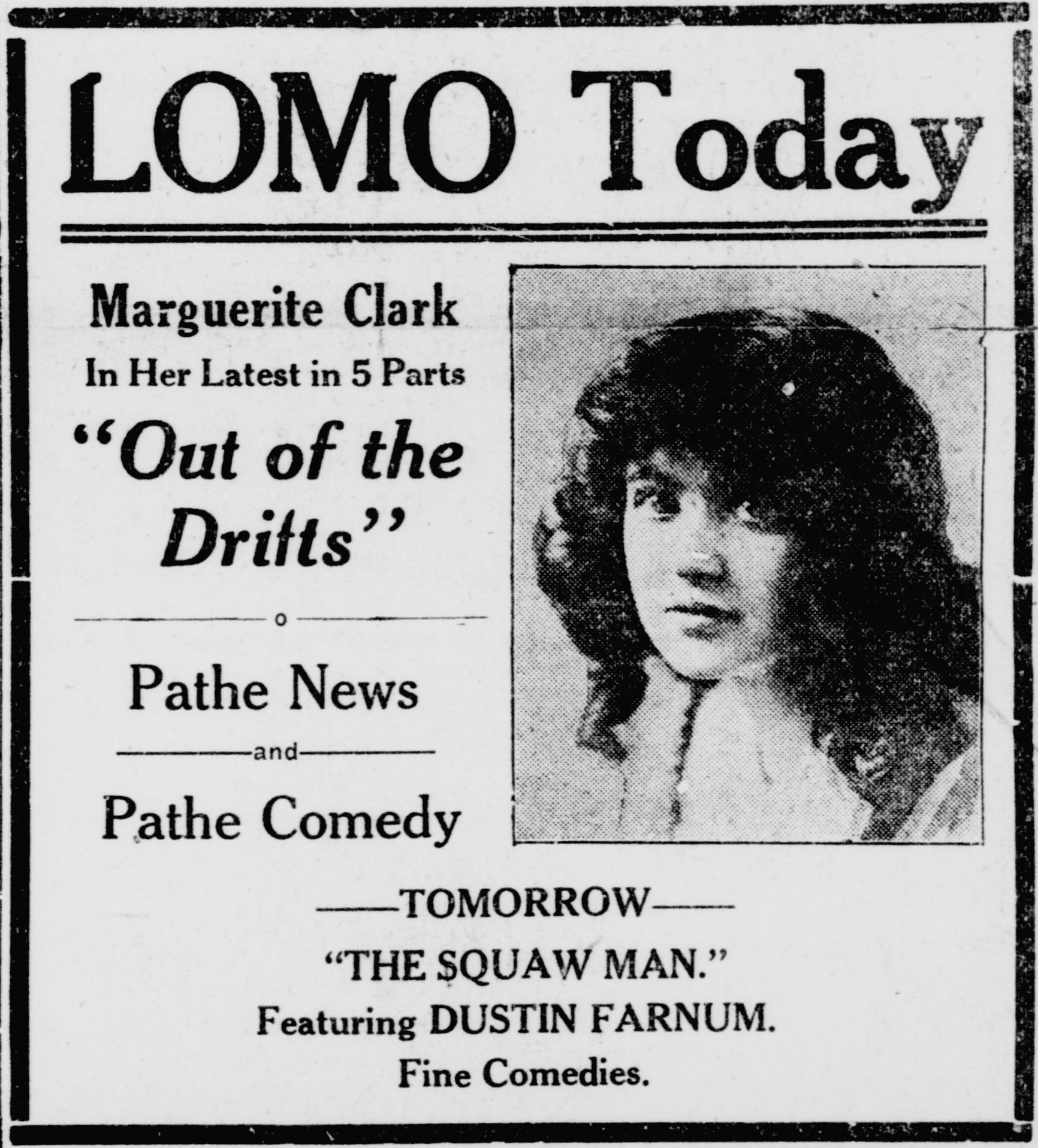
- Newspaper advertisement
- Directed by: J. Searle Dawley
- Written by: William H. Clifford
- Produced by: Famous Players Film Company
- Starring: Marguerite Clark
- Cinematography: Ned Van Buren
- Distributed by: Paramount Pictures
- Release date: February 24, 1916
- Running time: 50 minutes
- Country: United States
- Language: Silent film (English intertitles)

Out of the Drifts is a lost 1916 American silent romance film produced by the Famous Players Film Company and distributed by Paramount Pictures. It was directed by J. Searle Dawley and starred Marguerite Clark.

== Cast ==
- Marguerite Clark - Elise
- J. W. Johnston - Rudolph
- Albert Gran - Father Benedict
- William Courtleigh Jr. - George Van Rensselaer
- Ivan F. Simpson - Martin
- DeWitt Lillibridge - Reggie Featherstone
- Kitty Brown - Cleo
- Florence Johns - Trixie
- Robert Conville - Heinrich
