= The Bondage of Fear =

1917 film directed by Travers Vale

- Directed by: Travers Vale
- Written by: Rosalind Ivan; Thomas J. Kelly
- Produced by: William A. Brady
- Starring: Ethel Clayton; Edward Kimball; John Bowers
- Cinematography: Max Schneider
- Production company: Peerless Productions
- Distributed by: World Film
- Release date: January 23, 1917
- Running time: 5 reels
- Country: United States
- Languages: Silent; English intertitles

The Bondage of Fear is a 1917 American silent drama film directed by Travers Vale and starring Ethel Clayton, Edward Kimball, and John Bowers.

== Cast ==
- Ethel Clayton as Vesta Wheatley
- Edward Kimball as Dr. Jason Wheatley
- John Bowers as Dick Mortimer
- Rockliffe Fellowes as John Randolph
- Arthur Ashley as Skinny Morgan
- Frances Miller as Mandy Lee
- William Nash as Rastus
- George Morgan as Jim
- Elsie Bambrick as Maisie

== Bibliography ==
- Lowe, Denise. An Encyclopedic Dictionary of Women in Early American Films: 1895-1930. Routledge, 2014.
