= East of Suez (film) =

1925 film by Raoul Walsh

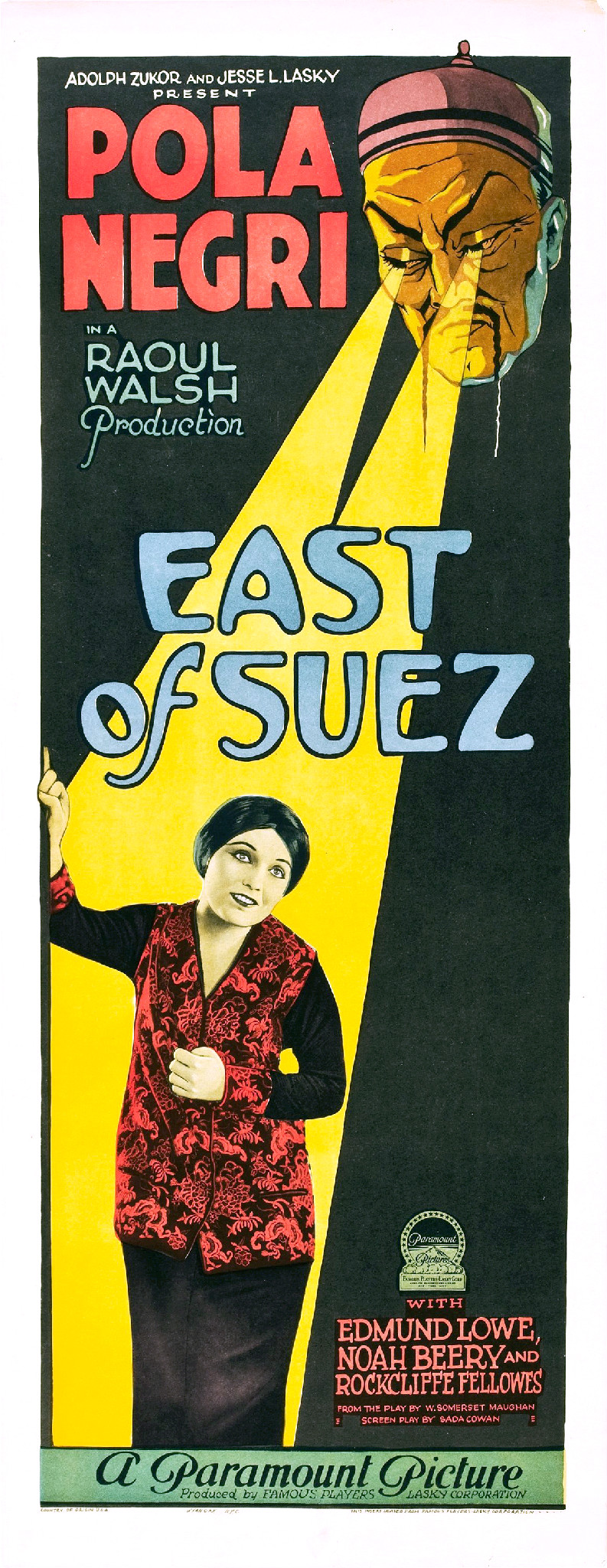
- Film poster
- Directed by: Raoul Walsh
- Written by: Sada Cowan (scenario)
- Based on: East of Suez by Somerset Maugham
- Produced by: Adolph Zukor; Jesse Lasky
- Starring: Pola Negri; Edmund Lowe; Rockliffe Fellowes
- Cinematography: Victor Milner
- Production company: Famous Players–Lasky Corporation
- Distributed by: Paramount Pictures
- Release date: January 12, 1925 (U.S.)
- Running time: 70 minutes
- Country: United States
- Language: Silent (English intertitles)

East of Suez is a 1925 American silent drama film directed by Raoul Walsh and starring Pola Negri. It is based on a play, East of Suez (1922), by W. Somerset Maugham. The film was produced by Famous Players–Lasky and distributed by Paramount Pictures.

== Plot ==
As described in a review in a film magazine, after being raised in England, Daisy Forbes returns to China, the country of her birth. She discovers that her father has recently died and that she has become a social outcast, owing to the public revelation that the Oriental nurse who raised her was actually her mother. Daisy is in love with George Tevis, a nephew of the British Consul, but he disappoints her when he's persuaded by his uncle to renounce her in favor of a diplomatic career. Lee Tai, a sinister mandarin, uses drugs and hypnotism to kidnap Daisy; she is rescued by Englishman Harry Anderson, whom she soon marries out of desperation. When Anderson discovers that Daisy is an ostracized half-caste and that he is now shunned, he bitterly regrets their marriage. Finally deciding to defy conventions and marry Daisy, George searches her out only to find that she is a married woman. Anderson forbids George to see Daisy again, saying that he will kill him, but George defies the ban and meets her at her house to say goodbye. Before he can shoot George, Anderson drinks wine that was poisoned at the orders of Lee Tai and dies. Tevis takes Daisy back to England, and Lee Tai is executed according to Chinese law.

== Cast ==
- Pola Negri as Daisy Forbes
- Edmund Lowe as George Tevis
- Rockliffe Fellowes as Harry Anderson
- Noah Beery as British Consul
- Sojin Kamiyama as Lee Tai
- Mrs. Wong Wing as Amah
- Florence Regnart as Sylvia Knox
- Charles Requa as Harold Knox
- E. H. Calvert as Sidney Forbes
- Sayre Dearing as Undetermined role (uncredited)
- Jesse Fuller as Undetermined role (uncredited)

== Preservation ==
With no prints of East of Suez located in any film archives, it is a lost film.
