= Burn 'Em Up Barnes (1921 film) =

1921 film

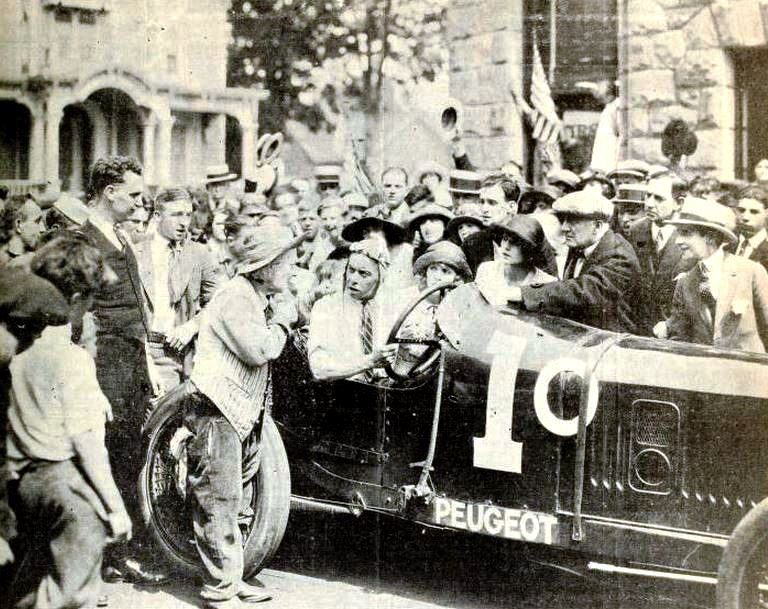
- Directed by: George Beranger
- Written by: Raymond L. Schrock; Harry L. Fraser
- Produced by: C.C. Burr
- Starring: Johnny Hines; Edmund Breese; George Fawcett
- Cinematography: Ted Beasley; Ned Van Buren; Hal Young
- Edited by: George Amy
- Production company: Mastodon Films
- Distributed by: Affiliated Distributors
- Release date: August 1, 1921
- Running time: 60 minutes
- Country: United States
- Languages: Silent; English intertitles

Burn 'Em Up Barnes is a 1921 American silent comedy action film directed by George Beranger and starring Johnny Hines, Edmund Breese and George Fawcett. It was loosely remade as a 1934 film of the same title.

== Cast ==
- Johnny Hines as Johnny 'Burn 'em Up' Barnes
- Edmund Breese as King Cole
- Betty Carpenter as Madge Thompson
- George Fawcett as Flannel
- J. Barney Sherry as Whitney Barnes
- Matthew Betz as Ed Scott
- Richard Thorpe as Stephen Thompson
- Julia Swayne Gordon as Mrs. Whitney Barnes
- Dorothy Leeds as Betty Scott
- Harry Frazer as Francis Jones
- Billy Boy Swinton as The Baby

== Bibliography ==
- Connelly, Robert B. The Silents: Silent Feature Films, 1910–36, Volume 40, Issue 2. December Press, 1998.
- Munden, Kenneth White. The American Film Institute Catalog of Motion Pictures Produced in the United States, Part 1. University of California Press, 1997.
