= If I Were Queen =

1922 film by Wesley Ruggles

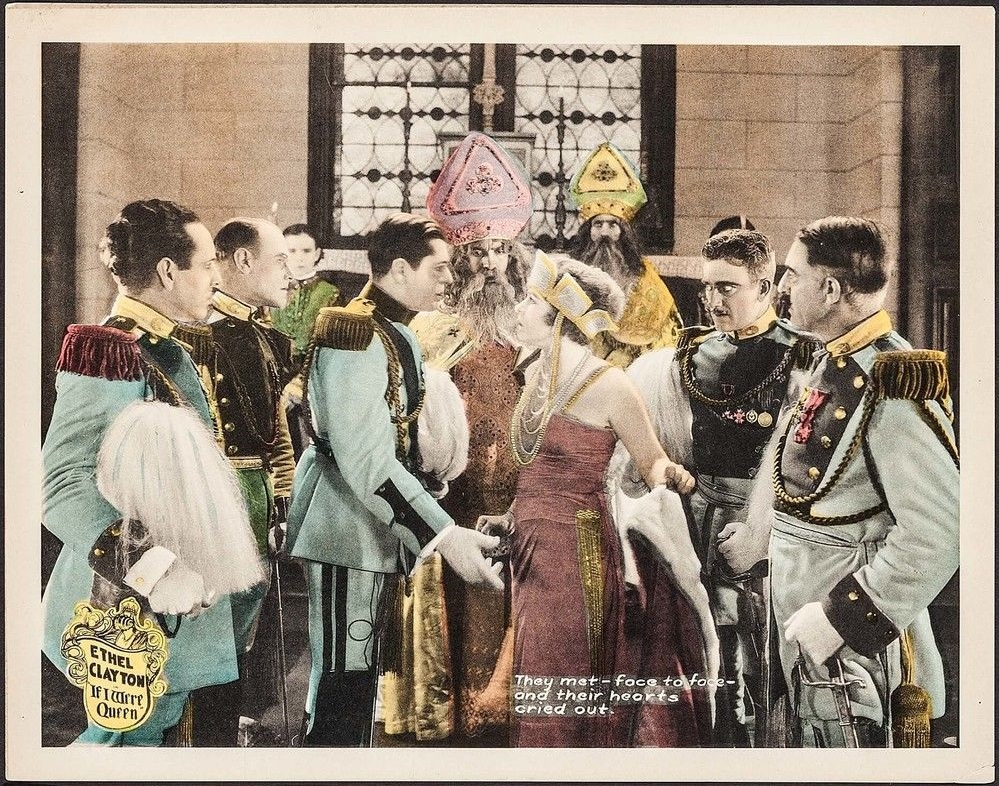
- Directed by: Wesley Ruggles
- Written by: Carol Warren (scenario)
- Based on: The Three Cornered Kingdom by Du Vernet Rabell
- Produced by: Robertson-Cole Pictures Corporation; Pat Powers
- Starring: Ethel Clayton; Warner Baxter
- Cinematography: Joseph A. DuBray
- Distributed by: Film Booking Offices of America
- Release date: November 15, 1922
- Running time: 6 reels
- Country: United States
- Language: Silent (English intertitles)

If I Were Queen is a lost 1922 American silent romantic drama film directed by Wesley Ruggles and starring Ethel Clayton. It is based on a short story by Du Vernett Rabell. FBO handled the distribution of the film. It is not known whether the film currently survives.

The title of the film may have been changed from that of the original short story because it bears slight resemblance to the Fox film If I Were King, which had come out a couple years before.

== Cast ==
- Ethel Clayton as Ruth Townley
- Andree Lejon as Oluf
- Warner Baxter as Vladimir
- Victory Bateman as Aunt Ollie
- Murdock MacQuarrie as Duke of Wortz
- Genevieve Blinn as Sister Ursula
