= Peerless Pictures Studios =

American film studio

Peerless Pictures, originally Peerless Features, was an early film studio in the United States. Jules Brulatour was a co-founder. The Peerless studio was built in 1914 on Linwood Avenue in Fort Lee, New Jersey, when the town was the center of America's first motion picture industry. The company was merged along with a couple of other early studios into World Pictures.

== History ==
The firm was founded by Brulatour and Eclair president Charles Jourjon as Peerless Features.

Clara Kimball Young left Vitagraph to join Peerless.

At one point the studio publicized plans to develop Starin's Glen Island but the land purchase was never completed.

The studio buildings burned down on November 23, 1958. A historical marker commemorates the location in Fort Lee, New Jersey where the World Pictures / Peerless studio on Lewis Street was located.

== Partial filmography ==
- Hearts in Exile (1915)
- Miss Petticoats (1916)
- The Summer Girl (1916)
- The Hidden Scar (1916)
- The Scarlet Oath (1916)
- The Iron Ring (film) (1917), Peerless Productions
- The Crimson Dove (1917), Peerless Productions
