= The Savage Woman (1918 film) =

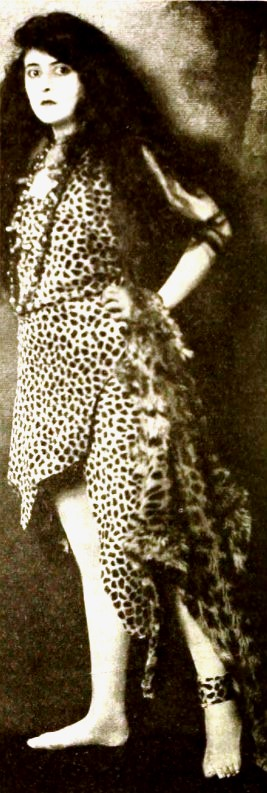
- Film still
- Directed by: Edmund Mortimer; Robert G. Vignola
- Written by: François de Curel (play); Kathryn Stuart
- Produced by: Clara Kimball Young
- Starring: Clara Kimball Young; Edward Kimball; Milton Sills
- Cinematography: Arthur Edeson
- Production company: Clara Kimball Young Film Corporation
- Distributed by: Select Pictures
- Release date: August 12, 1918
- Running time: 50 minutes
- Country: United States
- Language: Silent (English intertitles)

The Savage Woman is a 1918 American silent adventure film directed by Edmund Mortimer and Robert G. Vignola and starring Clara Kimball Young, Edward Kimball, and Milton Sills.

== Cast ==
- Clara Kimball Young as Renee Benoit
- Edward Kimball as Jacques Benoit
- Milton Sills as Jean Lerier
- Marcia Manon as Aimee Ducharme
- Clyde Benson as Prince Menelek

== Production ==
While filming in San Pedro, both Clara Kimball Young and her father sustained minor injuries when a shower of rocks fell on top of them. Clara had been hit in the head, and Edward sprained his ankle. Filming resumed shortly afterwards.

== Preservation ==
With no prints of The Savage Woman located in any film archives, it is a lost film.

== Bibliography ==
- Monaco, James. The Encyclopedia of Film. Perigee Books, 1991.
