= Joseph Kaufman (director) =

American actor

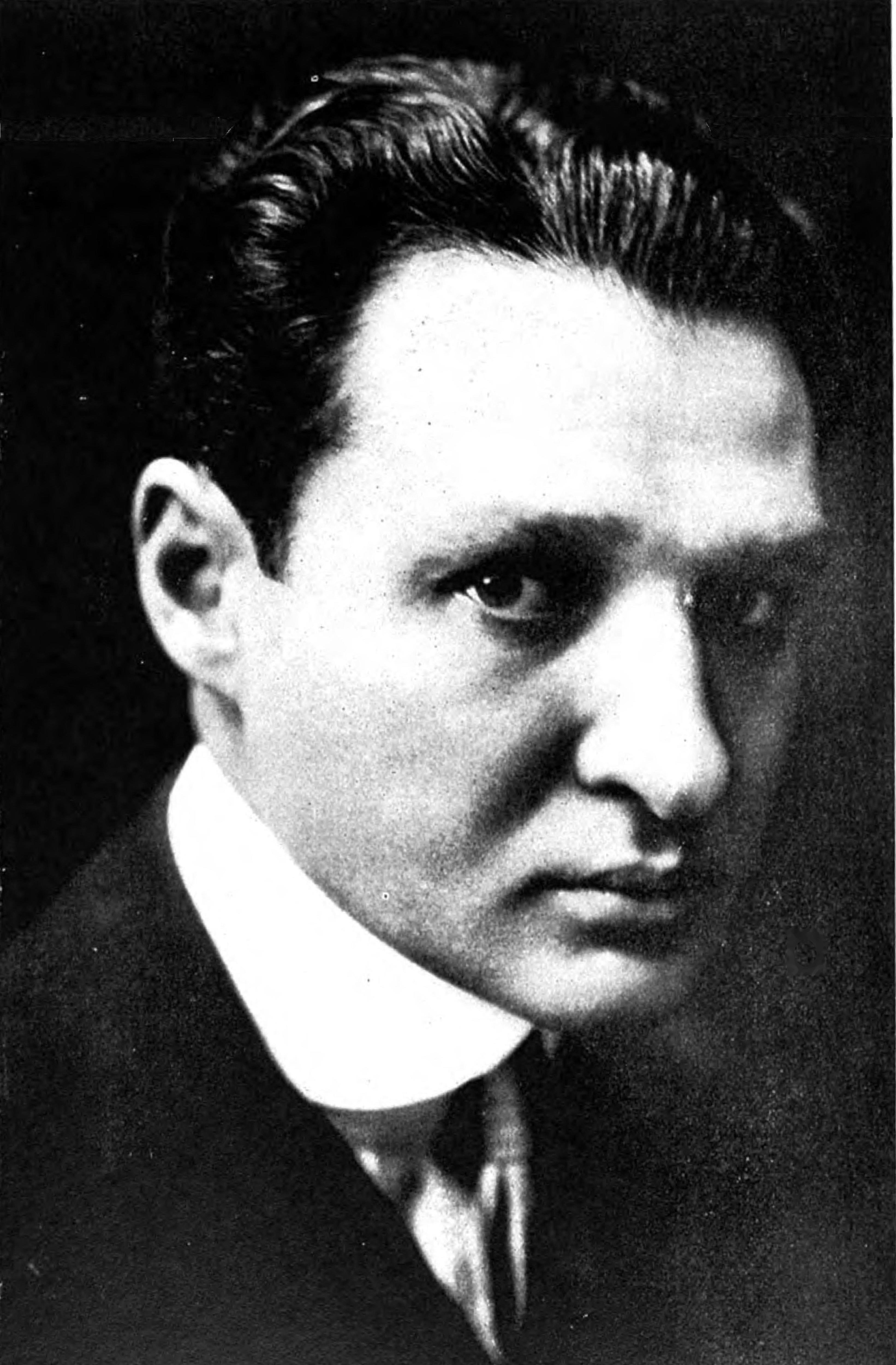
- Motion Picture Magazine, 1916
- Born: 1882; Washington, D.C., U.S.
- Died: February 1, 1918 (aged 35–36); New York City, U.S.
- Other name: Joseph Kauffman
- Occupation: film director
- Spouse(s): Ethel Clayton (m. 1915; his death 1918)

Joseph Kaufman (1882 – February 1, 1918) was an American silent film actor and director prominent during the World War I years. He was born in Washington, D.C., and died in New York City.

Kaufman graduated from Georgetown University. His wife was silent film star Ethel Clayton.

Kaufman started out as an actor appearing on Broadway in Mistakes Will Happen (1906) and The Pretty Sister of Jose (1903) with Maude Adams. His other Broadway credits included Three Twins (1908), Caught in the Rain (1906), Twiddle-Twaddle (1906), and La Belle Marseillaise (1905). He acted in a troupe of Henry B. Harris.

He eventually changed to acting in and then directing silent films, his output being numerous short films. As American films began to expand to feature length, Kaufman followed suit. He proved particularly adept and popular at directing beautiful Broadway actresses, including his wife Ethel Clayton. He directed Pauline Frederick, Marguerite Clark, and Billie Burke. His last film, The Song of Songs (1918), starred Elsie Ferguson.

Kaufman organized the Motion Picture Directors Association.

As actor he is reported to have had three teeth knocked out in a screen fight with actor Earl Metcalfe. Following his death in February 1918, both of his parents died—his mother on April 9, 1918, and his father on April 18, 1918.

Kaufman died of pneumonia on February 1, 1918, at New York's Polyclinic Hospital. He was 35 years old. His funeral was held at the Funeral Church on Broadway and 66th Street

== Selected filmography ==
- The Fortune Hunter (1914)
- The Wolf (1914) (*as actor)
- Heartaches (1915)

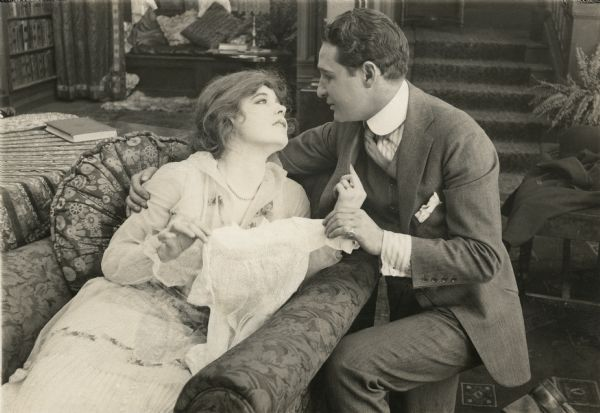
Ethel Clayton and Joseph Kaufman in A Woman Went Forth (1915)

- The College Widow (1915) (*as actor)
- The Sporting Duchess (1915)
- The World's Great Snare (1916)
- Dollars and the Woman (1916)
- Ashes of Embers (1916)
- Nanette of the Wilds (1916)
- Broadway Jones (1917)
- The Amazons (1917)
- Arms and the Girl (1917)
- The Land of Promise (1917)
- Shirley Kaye (1917)
- The Song of Songs (1918)
