= South Sea Love (1923 film) =

1923 film

- Directed by: David Selman (as David Soloman)
- Written by: Harrison Josephs
- Based on: "With the Tide" by: Fanny Hatton; Frederick Hatton
- Produced by: William Fox
- Starring: Shirley Mason; J. Frank Glendon; Francis McDonald
- Production company: Fox Film Corporation
- Release date: November 25, 1923 (US)
- Running time: 5 reels
- Country: United States
- Language: Silent (English intertitles)

South Sea Love is a 1923 American silent drama film directed by David Selman, which stars Shirley Mason, J. Frank Glendon, and Francis McDonald. The screenplay was written by Harrison Josephs, based on a short story by Fanny Hatton and Frederick Hatton, which appeared in the March 1923 edition of Young's Magazine.

== Plot ==
As described in a film magazine review, Captain Medina's daughter Dolores meets British trader Gerald Wilton aboard her father's ship. When the Captain dies, Wilton promises to take care of Dolores. When she learns that Wilton is already married, the young woman runs away and becomes a dancer in a tropical café. When his wife dies, Wilton finds that he is now free to rejoin Dolores. When he finds her, she rejects him. Her father's friends then combine to grab Wilton and hang him, but Dolores intervenes to save him. Dolores and Wilton are reconciled.

== Cast ==
- Shirley Mason as Dolores Medina
- J. Frank Glendon as Gerald Wilton
- Francis McDonald as Manuel Salarno
- Lillian Nicholson as Maria
- Charles A. Sellon as Captain Medina
- Fred Lancaster as Innkeeper
- Robert Conville as Stubbs

== See also ==
- South Seas genre
