= Ethel Clayton =

American actress

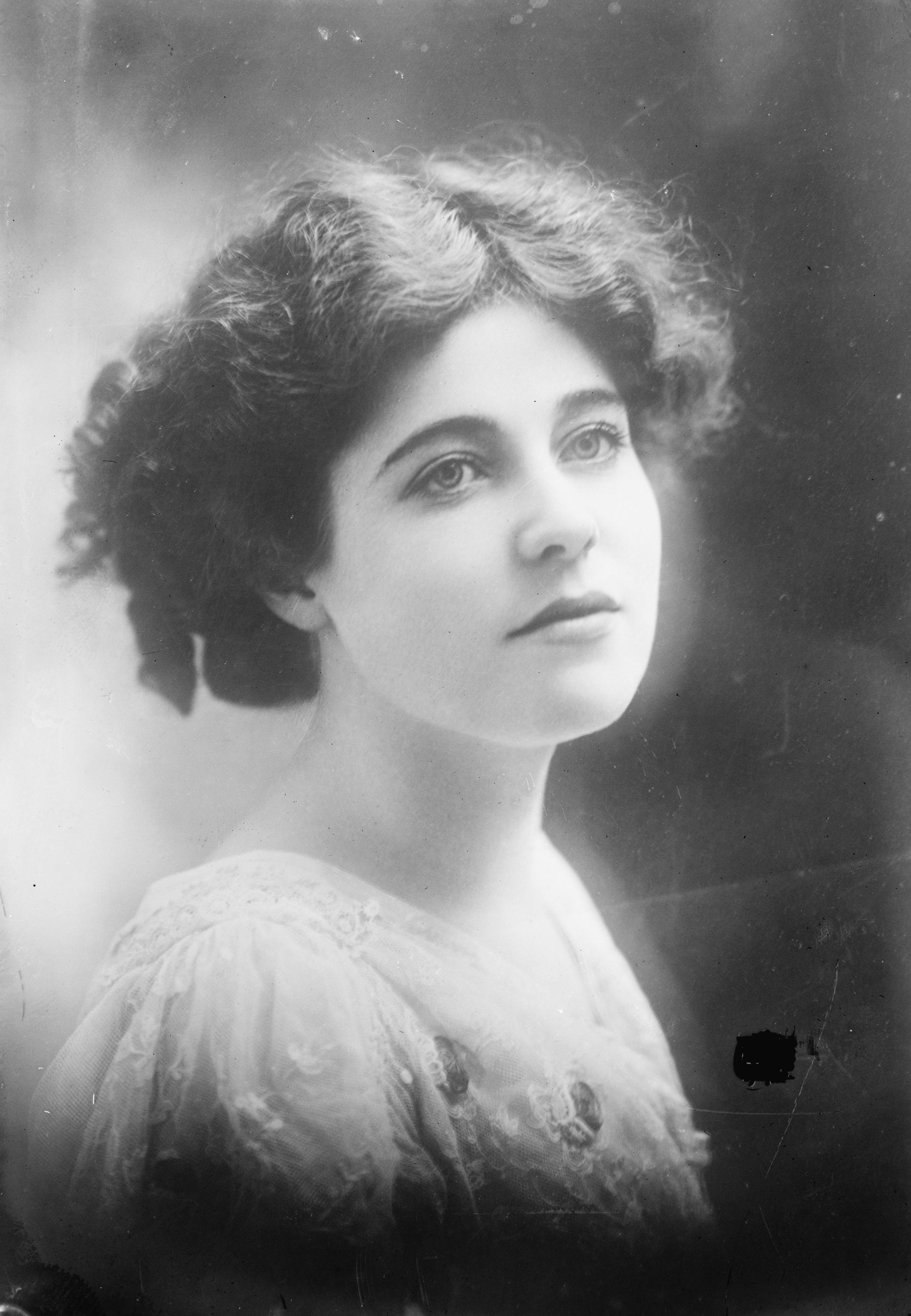
- Clayton in 1910
- Born: November 8, 1882; Champaign, Illinois, U.S.
- Died: June 6, 1966 (aged 83); Oxnard, California, U.S.
- Occupation: Actress
- Years active: 1909–1948
- Spouses: Joseph Kaufman (m. 1915; died 1918); Ian Keith (m. 1928; div. 1931)

Ethel Clayton (November 8, 1882 – June 6, 1966) was an American actress of the silent film era.

== Early years ==
Born in Champaign, Illinois, Clayton attended St. Elizabeth's school in Chicago.

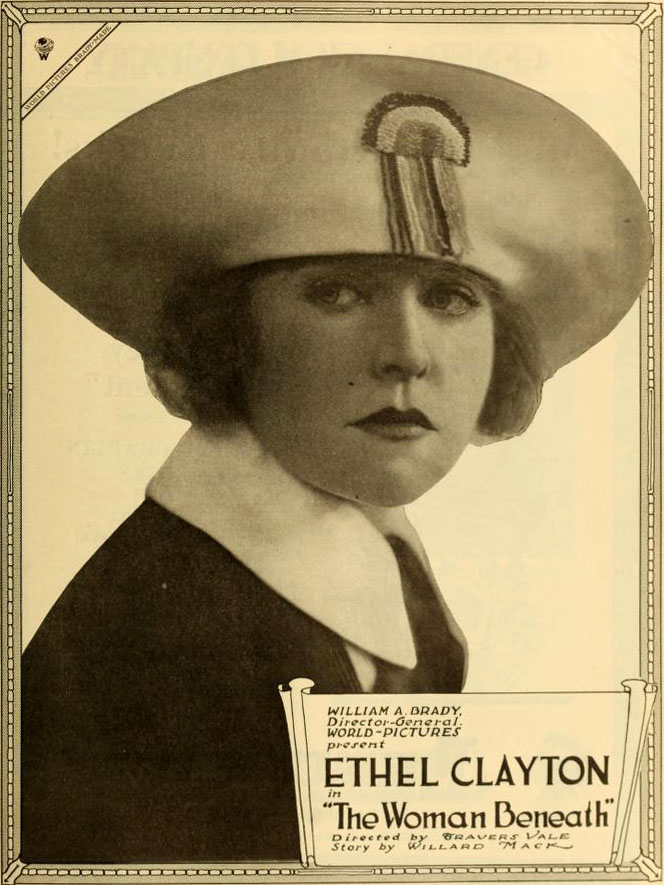
The Woman Beneath (1917)

== Career ==
Clayton debuted on stage as a professional as a member of the chorus in a production at the Chicago Opera House. After that, she worked with stock theater companies in Milwaukee and Minneapolis.

On stage, Clayton appeared mainly in musicals or musical revues such as Ziegfeld Follies of 1911. In addition to that production, her Broadway credits include Fancy Free (1918), You're in Love (1917), Nobody Home (1915), The Red Canary (1914), The Brute (1912), and His Name on the Door (1909).

Clayton's first film was When the Earth Trembled. Following appearances on screen in short dramas from 1909 to 1912, she made her feature-length film debut in For the Love of a Girl in 1912. Barry O'Neil directed the film, and Clayton later was directed by William Demille, Robert G. Vignola, George Melford and Donald Crisp in subsequent feature films. Like many silent film actors, Clayton's career was hurt by the coming of sound to motion pictures. She continued her career in small parts in films until she retired in 1948.

== Personal life ==
In 1931, Clayton obtained a California Superior Court order enjoining her former business partner, W.L. Rucker, from disposing of 316 pearls. Clayton and Rucker agreed to purchase a cosmetics business and the pearls had been entrusted to Rucker to raise money. The deal fell through and he refused to return the jewels. Rucker admitted to possessing the pearls but claimed they had been pledged as security for a $125 loan. The pearls were valued at $20,000.

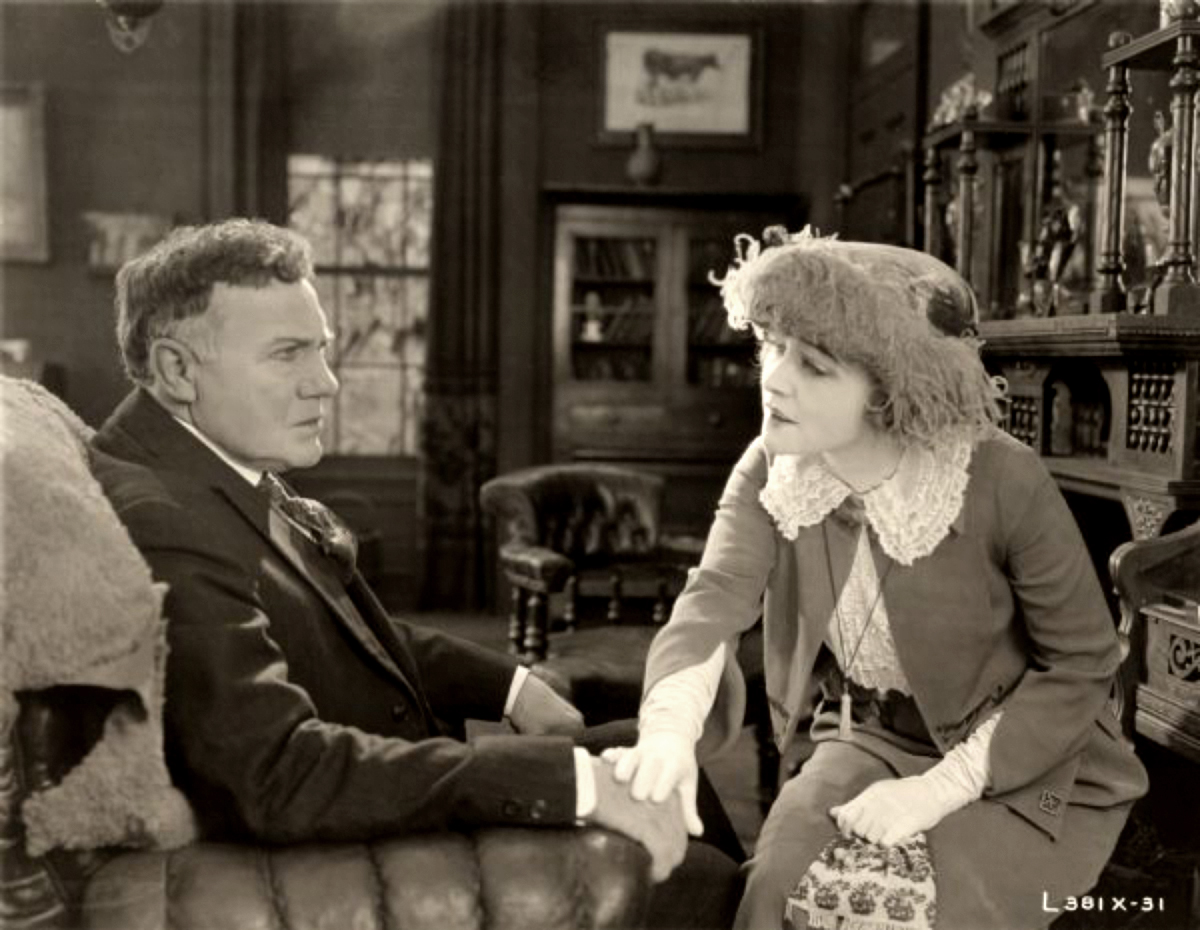
Charles K. French and Ethel Clayton in a scene from Beyond (1921)

=== Marriages ===
Clayton was first married to actor-director Joseph Kaufman until his death in 1918 in the Spanish flu epidemic. She later married silent film actor and former star Ian Keith twice and they divorced twice. In both cases Clayton cited cruelty and excessive drinking. Clayton and Keith were first married in Minneapolis in 1928 and first separated on January 13, 1931.

== Death ==
Clayton died on June 6, 1966, at Guardian Convalescent Hospital in Oxnard, California, aged 83. She was buried at Ivy Lawn Memorial Park in Ventura, California.

For her contributions to the motion picture industry, Clayton has a star on the Hollywood Walk of Fame at 6936 Hollywood Boulevard.

== Filmography ==
Silent Film Career
Year	Title	Role	Notes
1909	Justified	Mrs. John Seymour	short
1909	Gratitude	Mrs. Ralph Farson	short
1909	The Brothers	Ethel Daily	short
1909	The Twelfth Juror		short
1910	The Tout's Remembrance	Agnes Dudley	short
1912	For the Love of a Girl	Ethel	short
1912	A Romance of the Coast	Ethel Drayton	short
1912	The Doctor's Debt	Ethel Jordan	short
1912	The Last Rose of Summer	Ethel Boradon	short
1912	Pilgrim's Progress	Elizabeth	
1912	Just Maine Folk	Ethel	short
1912	An Irish Girl's Love	Kathleen	short
1912	The Wonderful One-Horse Shay	Ethel Hubbard	short
1912	Home Sweet Home	Mabel McCullum	short
1913	Art and Honor	Grace Hawkins	short
1913	His Children	Ethel Wynn	short
1913	Friend John	Ruth Rogers	short
1913	Heroes One and All	Jane Smiley	short
1913	The Faith of a Girl	Laura Mills	short
1913	A Hero Among Men	Ethel Menten	short
1913	Home, Sweet Home	Nell Barbour	short
1913	The Price Demanded	Rose Delane	short
1913	The New Gown	Elsie Biddle	short
1913	When Tony Pawned Lousia	Louisa	short
1913	The Police Inspector		short
1913	Mary's Temptation	Mary Wilmer	short
1913	The Burning Rivet	Margaret Sullivan	short
1913	Seeds of Wealth	Aline Maxwell	short
1913	Self-Convicted		short
1913	The Scarf Pin	Mary Forrest	short
1913	A Deal in Oil	Ethel Hammond	short
1913	His Code of Honor	Mary Dennis	short
1913	The Momentous Decision	Harry's Wife	short
1913	When the Earth Trembled	Dora Sims	Extant
1913	Partners in Crime	Esther Jansen	short
1913	The Scapegrace	Agnes Donald	short
1913	The Smuggler's Daughter	Jean Girot	short
1913	The Doctor's Romance	The Nurse	short
1914	The Lion and the Mouse	Shirley Rossmore/Sarah Green	
1914	The Catch of the Season	Frances Dean	short
1914	The Gamblers	Catherine Spencer Darwin	short
1914	A Daughter of Eve	Janet Dayton	short
1914	The House Next Door	Ulrica Cotswolt	
1914	The Wolf	Jules' Sweetheart	
1914	The Daughters of Men	Louise Stolbeck	
1914	The Fortune Hunter	Betty Graham	
1915	The Attorney for the Defense	Ruth Wingate	short
1915	The Furnace Man	Marjorie Gordon	short
1915	His Soul Mate	Nellie	short
1915	It All Depends	Clara Dean	short
1915	The Millinery Man	Nora Lyman	short
1915	A Woman Went Forth	Ethel Rogers	short
1915	Mazie Puts One Over	Mazie	short
1915	Here Comes the Bride	Reed's Stenographer	short
1915	The Blessed Miracle	Gail Bowman	short
1915	Monkey Business	Gerald's Fiancee	short
1915	The Unmarried Husband	Nell	short
1915	Capturing the Cook	Mabel Dinsmore	short
1915	Just Look at Jake	Elsie Bond	short
1915	The College Widow	Jane Witherspoon	Lost
1915	In the Dark	Julia Duval	short
1915	The Sporting Duchess	Lady Muriel Desborough	short
1915	The Darkness Before Dawn	Elsie Moore	short
1915	Money! Money! Money!	May	short
1915	When the Light Came In	Julia	short
1915	The Earl's Adventure	Sylvia Vantine	short
1915	A Day of Havoc	Estelle Adair	short
1915	The Deception	Frances Wharton	short
1915	It Was to Be	Anne Winton	short
1915	The Mirror	The Mountain Girl	short
1915	In Spite of Him	Elsie Biddle	short
1915	The Orgy	Nan Fuller	short
1915	The Great Divide	Ruth Jordan	Her last film produced by Lubin. Extant.
1916	Ophelia	Ophelia	
1916	Dollars and the Woman	Madge Hilyer	Lost
1916	His Brother's Wife	Helen Barton	
1916	A Woman's Way	Marion Livingstone	
1916	Husband and Wife	Doris Baker	
1916	The Hidden Scar	Janet Hall	
1916	Beyond the Wall	Helen Carlton/Virginia Carlton	
1916	The New South	Georgia Gwynne, as adult	
1917	The Bondage of Fear	Vesta Wheatley	
1917	The Woman Beneath	Betty Fairchild	
1917	The Web of Desire	Grace Miller	
1917	Man's Woman	Violet Galloway	
1917	Yankee Pluck	Polly Pollard	
1917	The Stolen Paradise	Joan Merrifield	Incomplete copy held by Library of Congress
1917	Souls Adrift	Elma Raybourne	
1917	The Dormant Power	Christine Brent	A copy is held at the EYE Filmmuseum
1917	Easy Money	Lois Page	
1918	Stolen Hours	Diana Lester	Copies are held by the LOC and National Archives of Canada
1918	The Whims of Society	Nora Carey	
1918	The Witch Woman	Marie Beaupre	Incomplete copy held by the LOC
1918	Journey's End	Aline Marsden	
1918	The Man Hunt	Betty Hammond	
1918	The Girl Who Came Back	Lois Hartner	
1918	A Soul Without Windows	Hopama	
1918	Women's Weapons	Anne Elliot	
1918	The Mystery Girl	Countess Therese/Driver 477	
1919	Maggie Pepper	Maggie Pepper	
1919	Pettigrew's Girl	Daisy Heath	
1919	The Woman Next Door	Mrs. Randolph Schuyler/Vicky Van	
1919	Men, Women, and Money	Marcel Middleton	
1919	A Sporting Chance	Carey Brent	
1919	More Deadly Than the Male	Helen O'Hara	
1920	The Thirteenth Commandment	Daphne Kip	
1920	Young Mrs. Winthrop	Constance Winthrop	
1920	A Lady in Love	Barbara Martin	
1920	The Ladder of Lies	Edith Parrish	
1920	Crooked Streets	Gail Ellis	A copy is held at the LOC
1920	A City Sparrow	Milly West	
1920	The Sins of Rosanne	Rosanne Ozanne	A copy is held at the LOC
1921	Suppose Nobody Cared	Stenographer	
1921	The Price of Possession	Helen Carston	
1921	Sham	Katherine Van Riper	
1921	Wealth	Mary McLeod	
1921	Beyond	Avis Langely	A copy is held at the LOC
1921	Exit the Vamp	Marion Shipley	
1922	Her Own Money	Mildred Carr	
1922	The Cradle	Margaret Harvey	A copy is held at the LOC
1922	For the Defense	Anne Woodstock	
1922	If I Were Queen	Ruth Townley	
1923	Can a Woman Love Twice?	Mary Grant	
1923	The Remittance Woman	Marie Campbell	
1925	The Mansion of Aching Hearts	Pauline Craig	
1925	Wings of Youth	Katherine Manners	Lost
1925	Lightnin'	Margaret Davis	A copy is held by MoMA
1926	The Bar-C Mystery	Mrs. Lane	Lost
1926	The Merry Widower	The Hunter's Wife	
1926	Sunny Side Up	Cissy Cason	
1926	Risky Business	Mrs. Stoughton	
1926	His New York Wife	Alicia Duval	
1927	The Princess from Hoboken	Mrs. O'Brien	Lost
1927	The Princess on Broadway	Mrs. Seymour	Lost
1928	Mother Machree	unknown role	Incomplete

Sound Film Career
Year	Title	Role	Notes
1929	Hit the Deck	Mrs. Payne	Sound debut
1930	Call of the Circus	The Woman	
1932	Hotel Continental	Mrs. Underwood	
1932	Thrill of Youth	Alice Fenwick	
1932	The Crooked Circle	Yvonne	
1932	The All American	Mrs. Bowen	
1933	Secrets	Audrey Carlton	
1933	Private Jones	Mrs. Winthrop	(uncredited)
1933	The Whispering Shadow	The Countess Helen	Chapters 5-8
1933	Let's Fall in Love	Star	(uncredited)
1936	Yours for the Asking	Casino Patron	(uncredited)
1936	Hollywood Boulevard	Ethel Clayton	(uncredited)
1936	Easy to Take	Relative	(uncredited)
1936	The Accusing Finger	Unknown role	(uncredited)
1937	Rich Relations	Mrs. Blair	
1937	Waikiki Wedding	Tourist	(uncredited)
1937	King of Gamblers	Matron	(uncredited)
1937	Make Way for Tomorrow	Customer	(uncredited)
1937	Turn Off the Moon	Lady	(uncredited)
1937	Easy Living	Unknown role	(uncredited)
1937	Exclusive	Matron	(uncredited)
1937	Artist and Models	Seamstress	(uncredited)
1937	Blonde Trouble	Townswoman	(uncredited)
1937	Souls at Sea	Passenger	(uncredited)
1937	Partners in Crime	Minor role	(uncredited)
1937	Hold 'Em Navy	Girl	
1937	Bulldog Drummond's Revenge	Minor role	(uncredited)
1937	Well's Fargo	Pioneer Woman	(uncredited)
1938	The Buccaneer	Woman selecting perfumes	(uncredited)
1938	The Big Broadcast of 1938	Woman	(uncredited)
1938	Scandal Street	Minor role	(uncredited)
1938	Bulldog Drummond's Peril	Minor role	(uncredited)
1938	Cocoanut Grove	Unknown role	(uncredited)
1938	You and Me	Employment Agency Clerk	(uncredited)
1938	Men with Wings	Woman	(uncredited)
1938	Sing, You Sinners	Minor role	(uncredited)
1938	If I Were King	Old Woman	(uncredited)
1938	The Arkansas Traveler	Townswoman	(uncredited)
1938	Say It in French	Minor role	(uncredited)
1938	Ride a Crooked Mile	Prison Visitor	(uncredited)
1938	Artists and Models Abroad	Woman	(uncredited)
1938	Tom Sawyer, Detective	Minor role	(uncredited)
1938	Paris Honeymoon	Unknown role	(uncredited)
1939	Ambush	Bank Customer	(uncredited)
1939	Boy Trouble	Small Town Woman	(uncredited)
1939	St. Louis Blues	Dancer	(uncredited)
1939	Cafe Society	Woman	(uncredited)
1939	The Sap Takes a Wrap	Mrs. Wallace	Short
1939	King of Chinatown	Nightclub Patron	(uncredited)
1939	I'm from Missouri	Minor role	(uncredited)
1939	Geronimo	Settler	(uncredited)
1940	Love Thy Neighbor	Minor role	(uncredited)
1941	West Point Widow	Nurse	(uncredited)
1941	New York Town	Minor role	(uncredited)
1942	Beyond the Blue Horizon	Guest at Chase's Residence	(uncredited)
1942	The Major and the Minor	Cadet Ball Guest	(uncredited)
1942	Lucky Jordan	Minor role	(uncredited)
1943	Lady Bodyguard	Woman	(uncredited)
1943	Dixie	Woman	(uncredited)
1943	Mardi Gras	Mardi Gras Woman	Short (uncredited)
1943	True to Life	Minor role	(uncredited)
1944	Henry Aldrich's Little Secret	Minor role	(uncredited)
1947	The Perils of Pauline	Lady Montague in Show	Final Role (uncredited)
