= The Forbidden Woman (1920 film) =

1920 film directed by Harry Garson

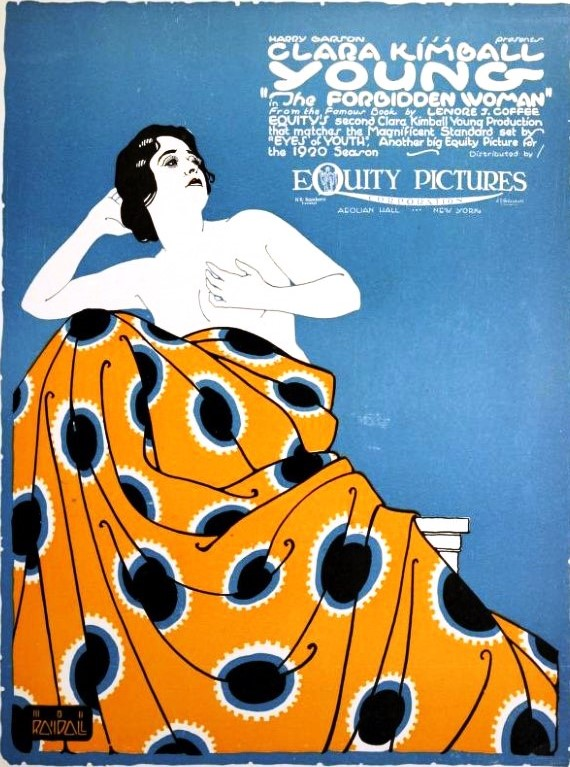
- Advertisement
- Directed by: Harry Garson
- Written by: Charles Whittaker
- Story by: Lenore Coffee
- Produced by: Harry Garson
- Starring: Clara Kimball Young
- Cinematography: Arthur Edeson
- Production company: Garson Studios
- Distributed by: Equity Pictures Corp. Robertson-Cole Distributing Corporation
- Release date: February 22, 1920
- Running time: 60 minutes
- Country: United States
- Language: Silent (English intertitles)

The Forbidden Woman is a 1920 American silent drama film produced and directed by Harry Garson and starring Clara Kimball Young.

== Cast ==
- Clara Kimball Young as Diane Sorel
- Conway Tearle as Malcolm Kent
- Jiquel Lanoe as Andrew De Clermont
- Kathryn Adams as Madame De Clermont
- Winter Hall as Edward Harding
- Milla Davenport as Luisa
- Stanton Williams as Jimmy
- John MacKinnon as The Butler

== Preservation ==
A complete print of The Forbidden Woman is preserved in the Library of Congress film collection.
