= Hearts in Exile =

Hearts in Exile may refer to:

- Hearts in Exile (1915 film), an American film directed by James Young and starring Clara Kimball Young
- Hearts in Exile (1929 film), an American romance film directed by Michael Curtiz and starring Dolores Costello
