= Eyes of Youth =

1919 film by Albert Parker

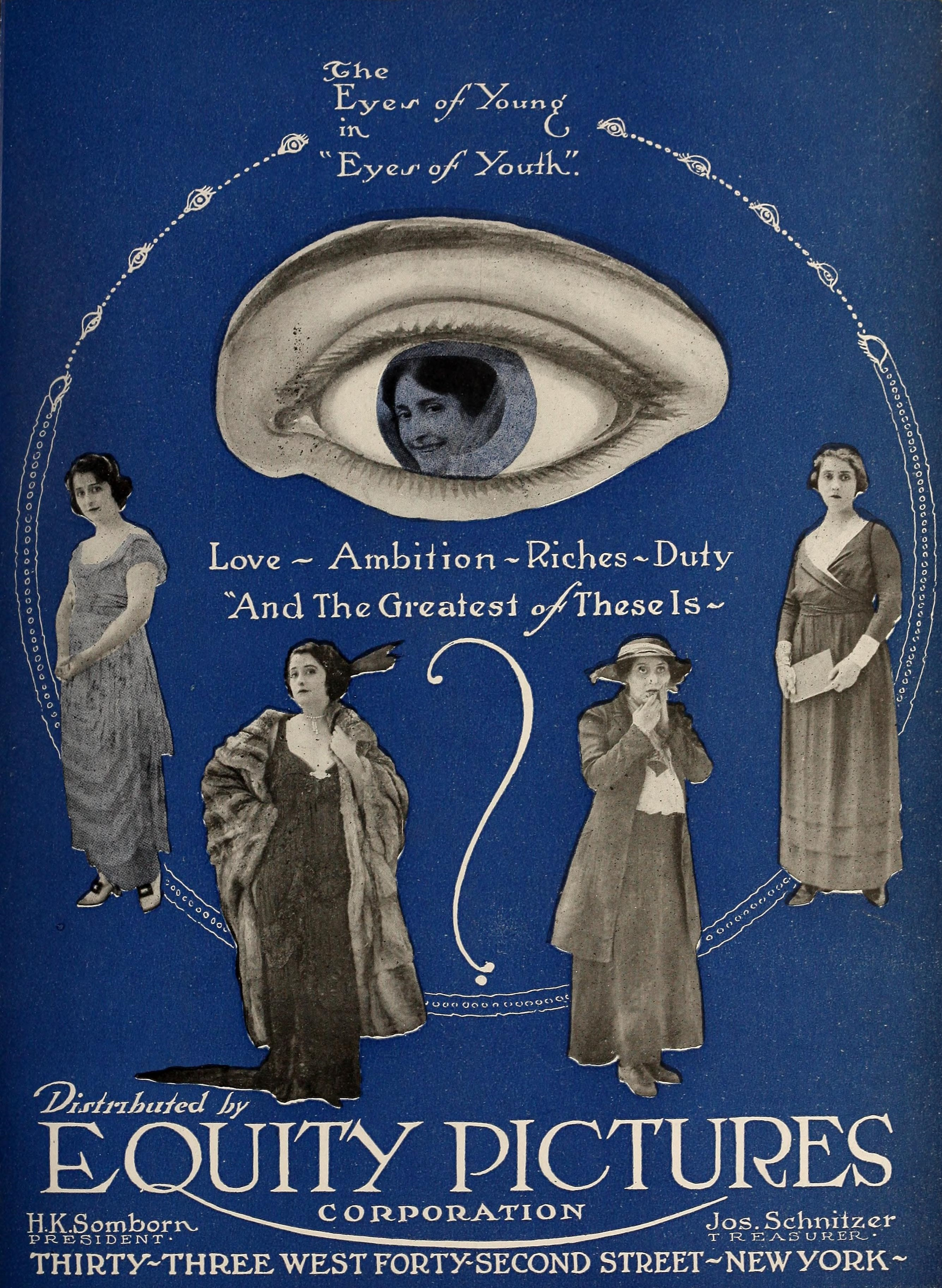
- Advertisement for the film in Motion Picture News
- Directed by: Albert Parker
- Written by: Albert Parker (scenario)
- Screenplay by: Charles E. Whitaker (adaptation)
- Based on: Eyes of Youth by Max Marcin and Charles Guernon
- Produced by: Harry Garson
- Starring: Clara Kimball Young; Gareth Hughes
- Cinematography: Arthur Edeson
- Production company: Garson Productions
- Distributed by: Equity Pictures Corporation
- Release dates: October 26, 1919 (New York City); November 30, 1919 (U.S.)
- Running time: 78 mins.
- Country: United States
- Languages: Silent film English intertitles

Eyes of Youth

Eyes of Youth is a 1919 American silent drama film directed by Albert Parker and starring Clara Kimball Young. The film was based on the stage play Eyes of Youth, performed on Broadway in 1917-18 and starred Marjorie Rambeau. This film also features Rudolph Valentino in a role as a thief/con artist.

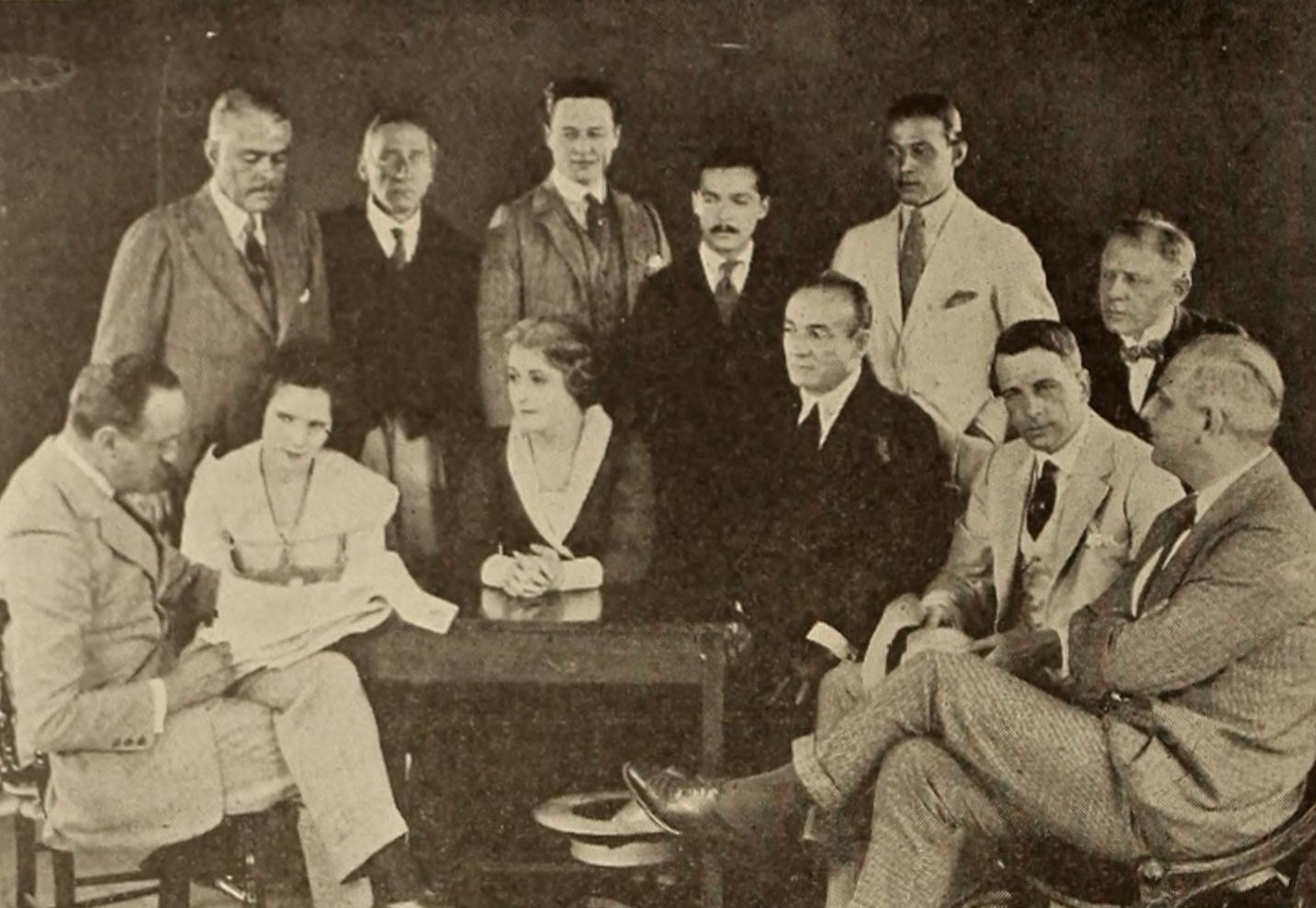
Cast of Eyes of Youth with director Parker at left. Valentino standing rear at right

This film is often credited as the vehicle that led Valentino to be cast in The Four Horseman of the Apocalypse (1921).

== Cast ==
- Clara Kimball Young - Gina Ashling
- Gareth Hughes - Kenneth Ashling
- Pauline Starke - Rita Ashling
- Sam Southern - Mr. Ashling
- Edmund Lowe - Peter Judson
- Ralph Lewis - Robert Goring
- Milton Sills - Louis Anthony
- Vincent Serrano - The Yogi
- William Courtleigh - Paolo Salvo
- Norman Selby - Dick Brownell (billed as "Kid McCoy")
- Rudolph Valentino - Clarence Morgan (billed as "Rudolfo Valentino")
- Claire Windsor - Guest at party (uncredited)

== Remake ==
The story was remade as The Love of Sunya (1927) starring Gloria Swanson and with Albert Parker once again directing.

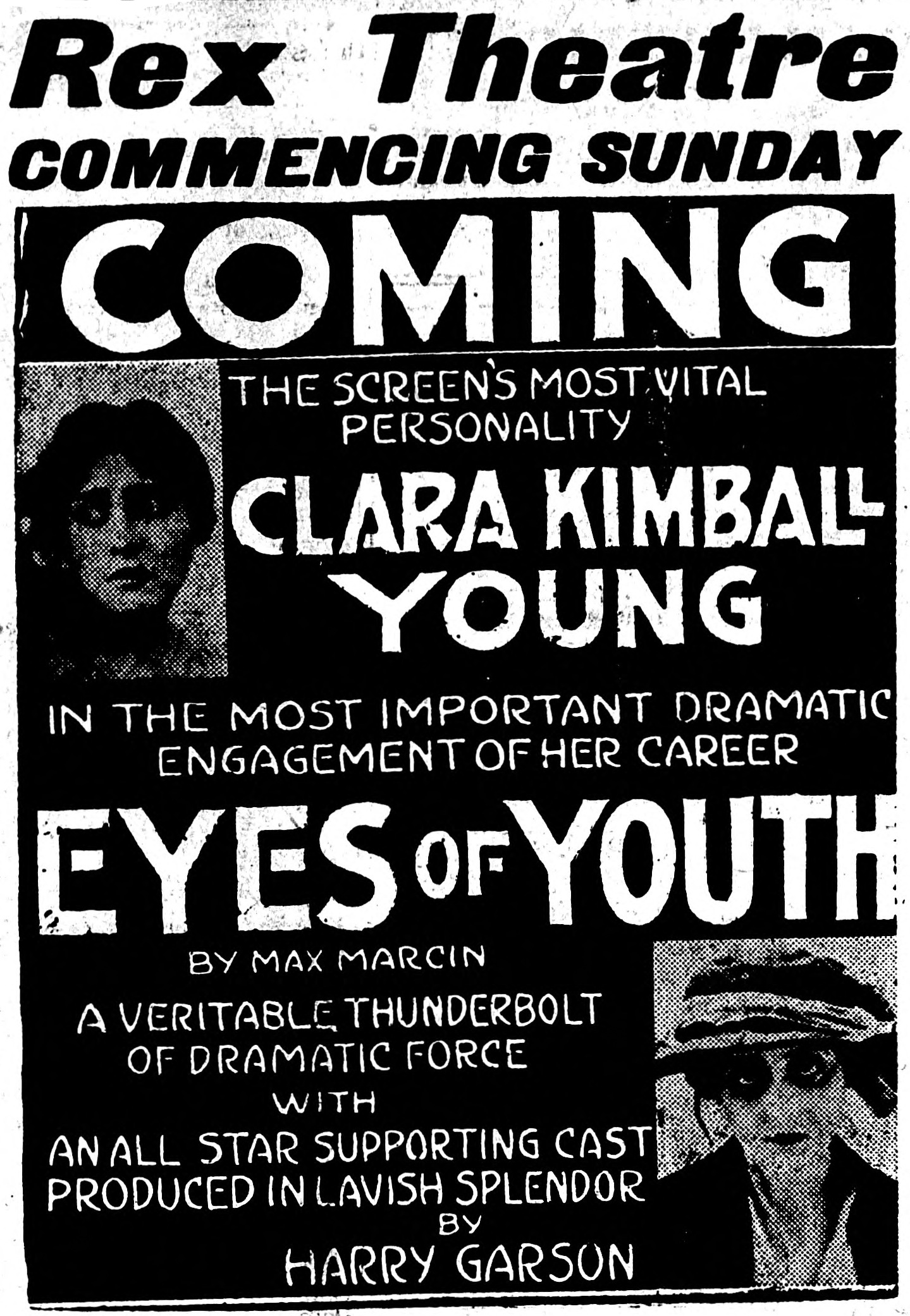
Newspaper ad (1920)

== Home media ==
On April 17, 2012, Eyes of Youth was released on Region 1 DVD by Alpha Home Entertainment
