= The Worldly Madonna =

1922 film

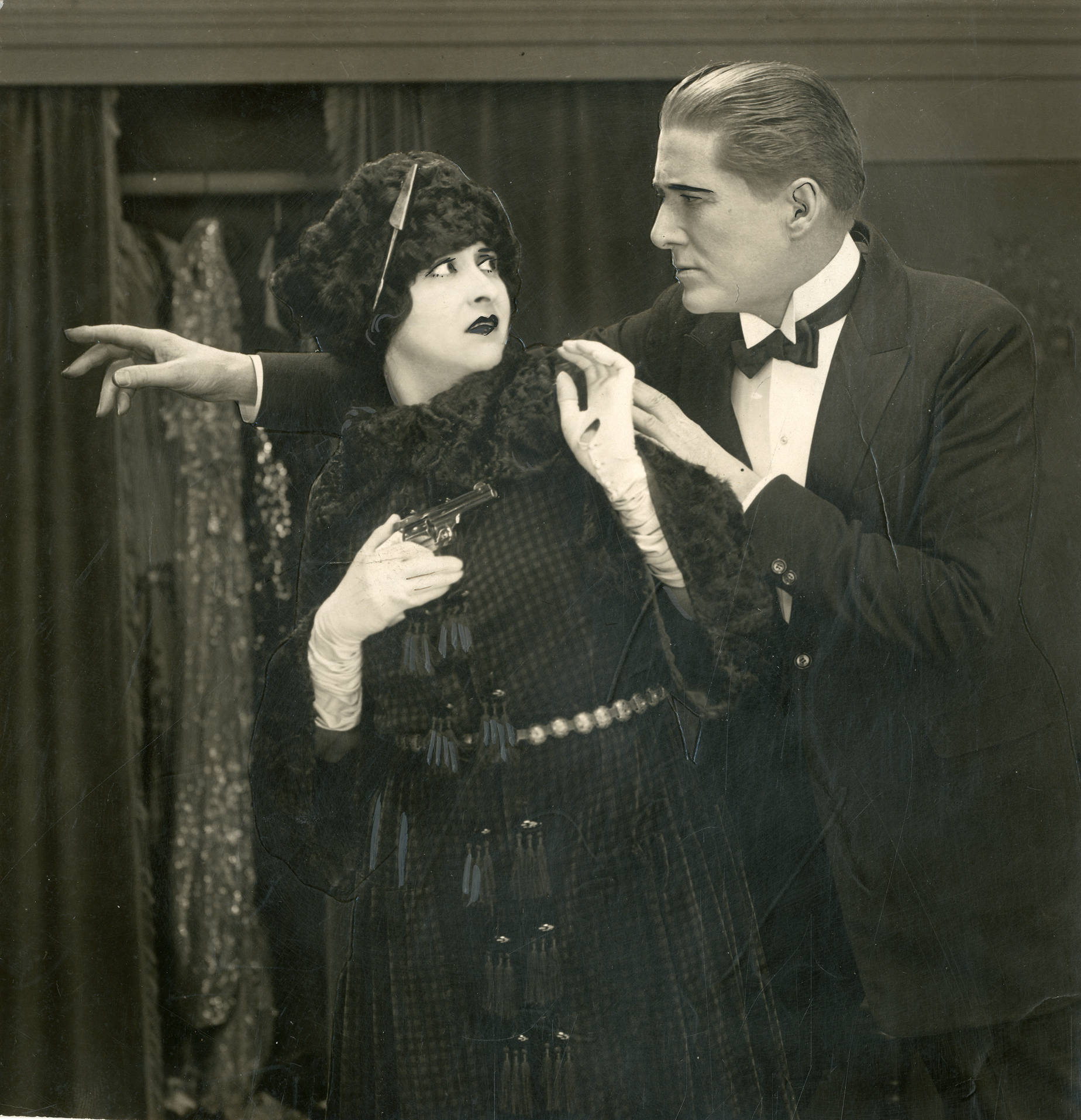
- Film still
- Directed by: Harry Garson
- Story by: Sada Cowan
- Starring: Clara Kimball Young; William P. Carleton
- Cinematography: Arthur Edeson
- Production company: Harry Garson Productions
- Distributed by: Equity Pictures
- Release date: May 1, 1922 (United States)
- Running time: 62 minutes
- Country: United States
- Language: Silent (English intertitles)

The Worldly Madonna is a 1922 American silent drama film directed by Harry Garson and starring Clara Kimball Young and William P. Carleton.

The film

== Plot ==
A nun at the convent, Janet Trevor plans to save her sister Lucy, who's been framed for murder, by switching places with her. As she steps into the spotlight of the cabaret where her sister works, she discovers a possible victim: John McBride, a politician loved by both. Meanwhile, restaurant entrepreneur Allan Graves threatens McBride and accuses Janet, who mistakes her for Lucy, of having been a witness to the murder that John is accused of. Confessing to the crime is a hunchback named Ramez, but not until the deception of the girls is made public. Graves refuses this offer and accuses Lucy of being a drug addict. Though she confesses to the sin, she denies that neither she nor McBride were involved in the murder. It is soon revealed the victim wasn't murdered at all, but rather bribed to leave the country so that Graves could get McBride in his position. After the presentation of the evidence, Mcbride confesses his love for Janet while Lucy leads a new, fruitful life thanks to her selfless sister.

== Cast ==
- Clara Kimball Young as Lucy Trevor, dancer/Janet Trevor, nun
- William P. Carleton as John McBride
- Richard Tucker as Alan Graves
- George Hackathorne as Ramez
- Jean de Limur as Toni Lorenz
- William Marion as Dr. Krell
- Milla Davenport as Jail Matron
