= The Road Through the Dark =

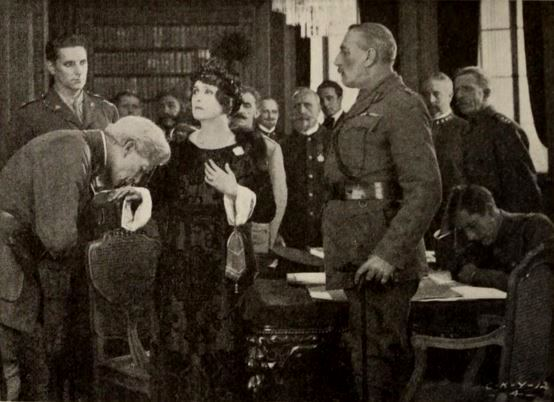
- Directed by: Edmund Mortimer
- Written by: Kathryn Stuart; Maude Radford Warren
- Produced by: Clara Kimball Young
- Starring: Clara Kimball Young; Jack Holt; Elinor Fair
- Cinematography: Arthur Edeson
- Production company: Clara Kimball Young Film Corporation
- Distributed by: Selznick Pictures
- Release date: November 1918
- Running time: 50 minutes
- Country: United States
- Languages: Silent; English intertitles

The Road Through the Dark is a 1918 American silent war drama film directed by Edmund Mortimer and starring Clara Kimball Young, Jack Holt, and Elinor Fair. It was made as an anti-German propaganda piece during World War I.

== Cast ==
- Clara Kimball Young as Gabrielle Jardee
- Jack Holt as Duke Karl
- Henry Woodward as John Morgan
- Elinor Fair as Marie-Louise
- Bobby Connelly as Georges
- John Steppling as Antoine Jardee
- Lillian Leighton as Louise Jardee
- Edward Kimball as Father Alphonse
- Elmo Lincoln as Pvt. Schultz
- Eugenie Besserer as Aunt Julie

== Bibliography ==
- Langman, Larry. American Film Cycles: The Silent Era. Greenwood Publishing, 1998.
