= Hush (1921 film) =

1921 film

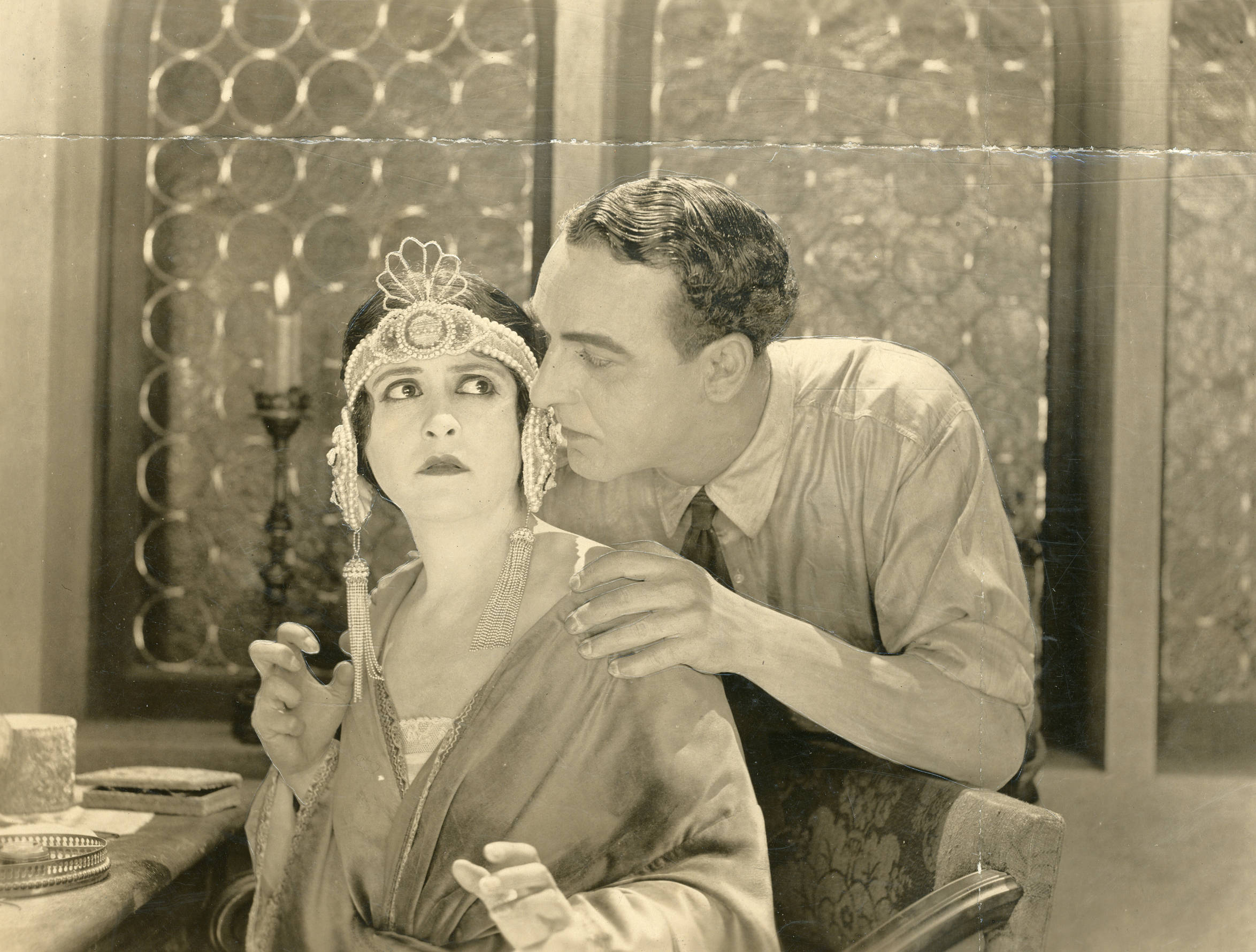
- Directed by: Harry Garson
- Written by: Sada Cowan; Lenore J. Coffee
- Produced by: Harry Garson
- Starring: Clara Kimball Young; J. Frank Glendon; Kathlyn Williams
- Cinematography: Arthur Edeson
- Production company: Equity Pictures
- Distributed by: Equity Pictures
- Release date: February 5, 1921
- Running time: 60 minutes
- Country: United States
- Languages: Silent; English intertitles

Hush is a 1921 American silent drama film directed by Harry Garson and starring Clara Kimball Young, J. Frank Glendon and Kathlyn Williams.

== Cast ==
- Clara Kimball Young as Vera Stanford
- J. Frank Glendon as Jack Stanford
- Kathlyn Williams as Isabel Dane
- Jack Pratt as Hugh Graham
- Bertram Grassby as Herbert Brooks
- Gerard Alexander as Grace Brooks
- Beatrice La Plante as Maid
- John Underhill as Butler

== Bibliography ==
- Connelly, Robert B. The Silents: Silent Feature Films, 1910-36, Volume 40, Issue 2. December Press, 1998.
- Munden, Kenneth White. The American Film Institute Catalog of Motion Pictures Produced in the United States, Part 1. University of California Press, 1997.
