= The Beast of Borneo =

1934 film by Harry Garson

- Directed by: Harry Garson
- Written by: Alfred Hustwick (screenplay); Alfred Hustwick (story); Frank J. Murray (story)
- Produced by: Harry Garson (producer)
- Cinematography: Lewis W. Physioc
- Edited by: William Faris
- Production company: Far East Productions
- Distributed by: DuWorld Pictures
- Release date: April 14, 1934
- Running time: 63 minutes
- Country: United States
- Language: English

The Beast of Borneo is a 1934 American pre-code film directed by Harry Garson. The film is made up mostly of leftover footage from Universal Studios's East of Borneo, made in 1931. A couple of added dialogue scenes were spliced into what was essentially a travelogue and a series of close-ups of an enraged orangutan.

== Plot ==
A noted big game hunter, Bob Ward (John Preston), is visited in the jungles of Borneo by Russian scientist Boris Borodoff (Eugene Sigaloff) and his assistant Alma Thorne (Mae Stuart), who want to prove the evolutionary link between humans and apes. Ward at first declines to lead the scientists to a group of Bornean orangutans, but Alma's charms finally convince him. Along with Ward's pet orangutan, Borneo Joe, they track the apes and actually manage to capture a male orangutan, whom Dr. Borodoff anaesthetizes with a shot of whiskey. Borodoff, it soon appears, is insane—and Bob, in an effort to calm him down, is knocked unconscious and dragged into the jungle by the tormented orangutan. He is rescued by Alma and Borneo Joe, but the trio can only watch as the enraged ape kills Dr. Borodoff.

== Cast ==
- John Preston as Bob Ward
- Mae Stuart as Alma Thorne
- Eugene Sigaloff as Dr. Boris Borodoff
- Val Duran as Darmo
- Doris Brook as Nahnda
- Alexander Schoenberg as Controller Derrick van de Mark
- John Peters as Mr. Kruger
