= For the Soul of Rafael =

1920 film

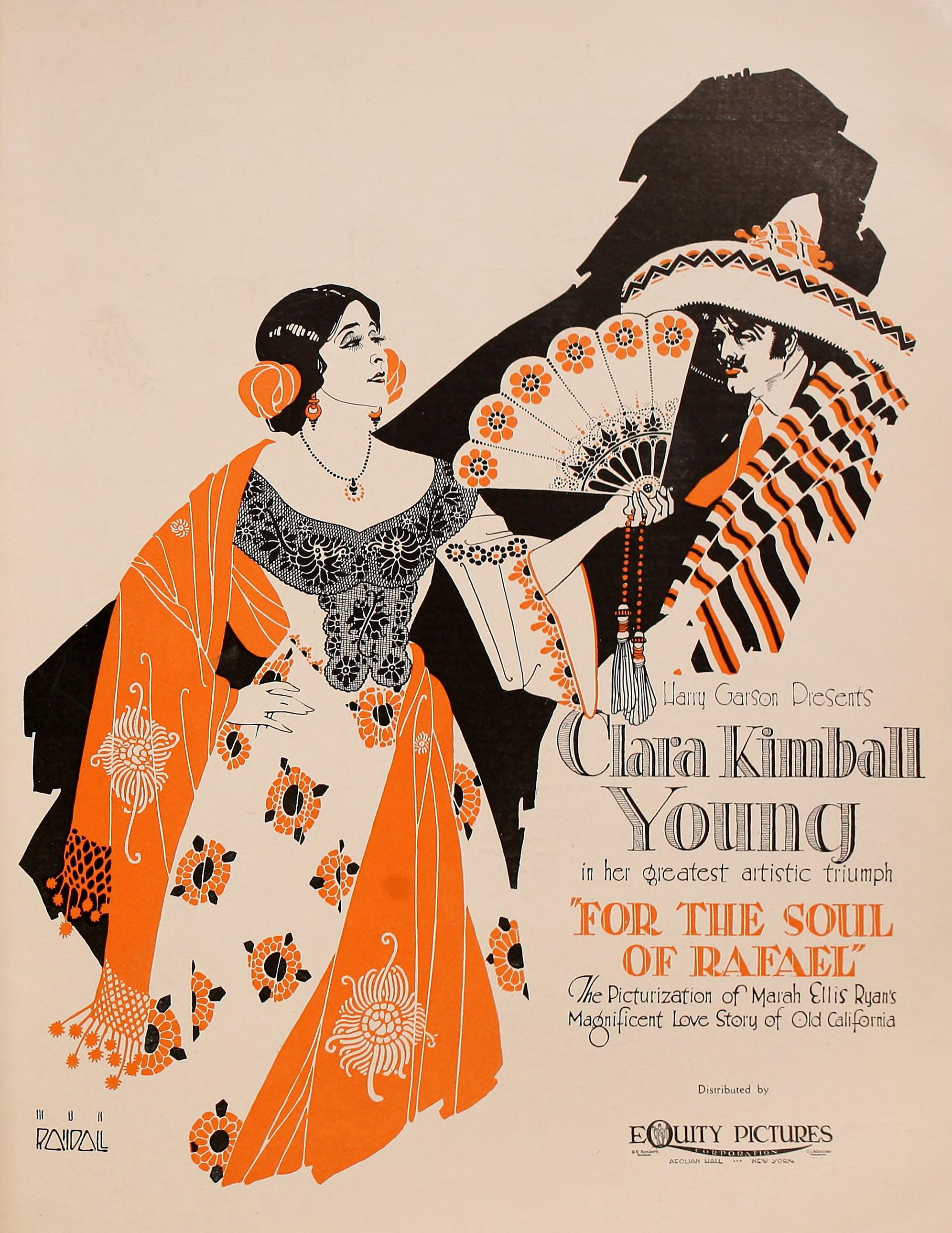
- Directed by: Harry Garson
- Written by: Marah Ellis Ryan (stories); Dorothy Yost; Charles E. Whittaker; Lenore J. Coffee
- Produced by: Harry Garson
- Starring: Clara Kimball Young; Bertram Grassby; Eugenie Besserer
- Cinematography: Arthur Edeson
- Production company: Equity Pictures
- Distributed by: Equity Pictures
- Release date: May 1920
- Running time: 70 minutes
- Country: United States
- Languages: Silent; English intertitles

For the Soul of Rafael is a 1920 American silent drama film directed by Harry Garson and starring Clara Kimball Young, Bertram Grassby and Eugenie Besserer.

== Cast ==
- Clara Kimball Young as Marta Raquel Estevan
- Bertram Grassby as Rafael Artega
- Eugenie Besserer as Dona Luisa
- Juan de la Cruz as El Capitan
- J. Frank Glendon as Keith Bryton
- Ruth King as Ana Mendez
- Helene Sullivan as Angela Bryton
- Paula Merritt as Polonia
- Maude Emory as Teresa
- Edward Kimball as Ricardo

== Bibliography ==
- Connelly, Robert B. The Silents: Silent Feature Films, 1910-36, Volume 40, Issue 2. December Press, 1998.
- Munden, Kenneth White. The American Film Institute Catalog of Motion Pictures Produced in the United States, Part 1. University of California Press, 1997.
