= Mid-Channel =

1920 film by Harry Garson

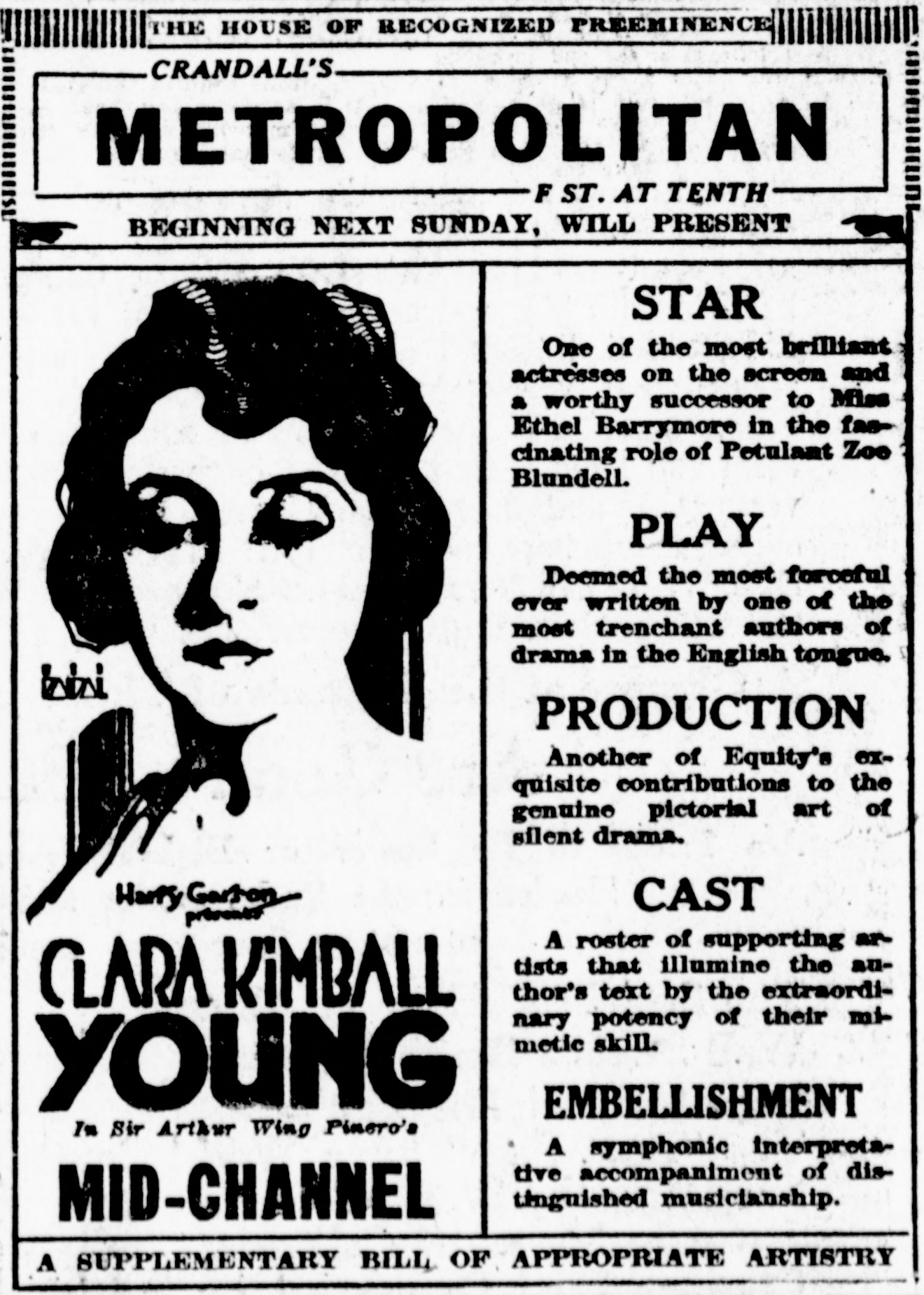
- Newspaper advertisement
- Directed by: Harry Garson
- Written by: George Ingleton (scenario)
- Based on: Mid-Channel by Arthur Wing Pinero
- Produced by: Harry Garson
- Starring: Clara Kimball Young
- Cinematography: Arthur Edeson
- Production companies: Garson Studios, Inc.
- Distributed by: Equity Pictures
- Release date: September 27, 1920
- Running time: 6 reels
- Country: United States
- Language: Silent (English intertitles)

Mid-Channel is a 1920 American silent drama film based on the 1909 play of the same name written by Sir Arthur Wing Pinero. The film was produced and directed by Harry Garson and stars Clara Kimball Young. On Broadway, the play starred Ethel Barrymore.

== Plot ==
As described in a film magazine, Zoe and Theodore Blundell have reached that period of married life when parties become monotonous to each other and find petty fault, forgetting the love of former years. Zoe yearns for children, and earlier in their married life, they agreed not to have children until their financial status had improved. Now that they are wealthy, they are forever at odds and rarely in each other's company. They quarrel, and Zoe goes to her room and reads Pinero's Mid-Channel. As Theodore is always busy, Zoe seeks diversion in the company of faithful friends, including Theodore's partner Peter Mottram and Leonard Ferris. Zoe's friend Mrs. Pierpont makes every effort to match her daughter Ethel with Leonard, and at first, everything seems to go smoothly. As the rupture between Zoe and Theodore reaches the breaking point, Zoe turns to Leonard for sympathy. The Blundells finally separate, and Zoe goes abroad. Theodore meets the designing widow, Mrs. Annerly, who wins him. Zoe hears of that relationship and, in despair, turns to Leonard. After many months, Zoe returns home, and Leonard tells him to see her attorneys. She still loves her husband, and Leonard is becoming somewhat of a bore, but she sees them anyway. Theodore, in the meantime, has broken up with Mrs. Annerly. Peter, at this critical point, attempts to patch things up between Zoe and Theodore. Theodore confesses to Zoe his relations with Mrs. Annerly. When Zoe confesses hers to Leonard, the reconciliation is cut short. Zoe goes to Leonard, who has become engaged to Ethel by this time. Forsaken by everyone, Zoe jumps out of a window to her death. The film then cuts back, and Zoe is seen shutting the book that contained the story she has been acting out in her mind. She goes to her husband, and they work on a reconciliation.

== Cast ==
- Clara Kimball Young as Zoe Blundell
- J. Frank Glendon as Theodore Blundell
- Edward Kimball as Honorable Peter Mottram
- Bertram Grassby as Leonard Ferris
- Eileen Robinson as Mrs. Pierpont
- Helene Sullivan as Mrs. Annerly
- Katherine Griffith as Ethel Pierpont
- Jack Livingston as Claude Roberts
- Frank Coghlan Jr. (uncredited)

== Home media ==
The film has been released on DVD.
