= What No Man Knows =

1921 film

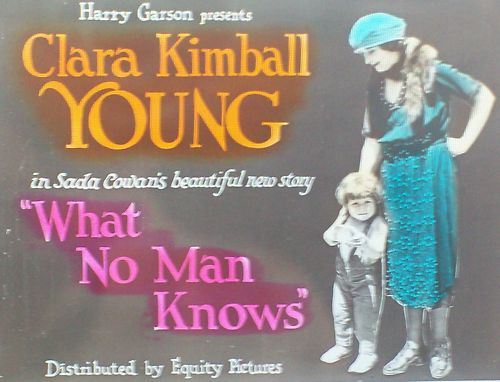
- Lantern slide, 1921
- Directed by: Harry Garson
- Written by: Sada Cowan (story, scenario)
- Produced by: Harry Garson
- Starring: Clara Kimball Young; Lowell Sherman
- Cinematography: Sam Landers
- Distributed by: Equity Pictures Corporation
- Release date: November 1, 1921
- Running time: 6 reels
- Country: United States
- Language: Silent..English intertitles

What No Man Knows is a 1921 silent film drama produced and directed by Harry Garson and starring Clara Kimball Young.

== Cast ==
- Clara Kimball Young as Norma Harvey
- Lowell Sherman as Craig Dunlap
- Dorothy Wallace as Bertha Dunlap
- William P. Carleton as Drake Blackly
- Jeanne Carpenter as Mazie
- Dulcie Cooper -
- Edward M. Kimball - (uncredited)
- Arthur Millett - (uncredited)
- Rolfe Sedan - (uncredited)

== Preservation status ==
- The film survives at the Library of Congress though in a condensed and/or incomplete version.
