= The Woman of Bronze =

1923 film directed by King Vidor

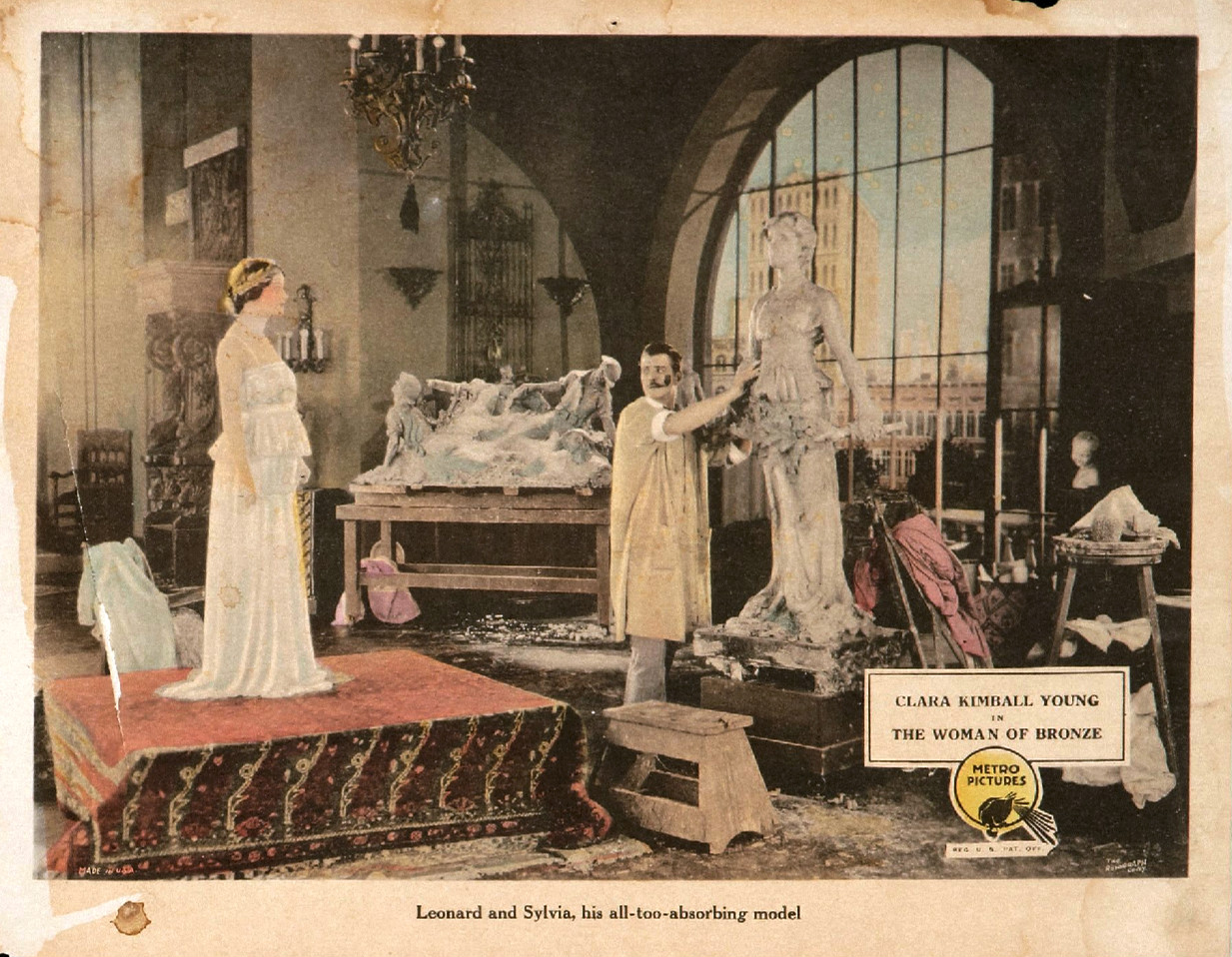
- Lobby card
- Directed by: King Vidor
- Written by: Louis D. Lighton; Hope Loring
- Based on: The Woman of Bronze by Henry Kistemaeckers, adapted by Paul Kester
- Produced by: Harry Garson; Samuel Zierler
- Starring: Clara Kimball Young
- Cinematography: L. William O'Connell
- Distributed by: Metro Pictures
- Release date: February 23, 1923
- Country: United States
- Language: Silent (English intertitles)

The Woman of Bronze is a 1923 American silent drama film directed by King Vidor and distributed through Metro Pictures. It is based on a 1920 Broadway play by Henry Kistemaeckers (adapted by Paul Kester) which starred Margaret Anglin, John Halliday, and Mary Fowler. The film version is considered to be lost.

== Plot ==
Vivian, a long-suffering wife, endures her artist husband’s infidelity with Sylvia, his young model. Leonard redeems himself when he recognizes the spiritual character of his wife. Vidor considered the film “out of my line.”

== Cast ==
- Clara Kimball Young as Vivian Hunt
- John Bowers as Paddy Miles
- Kathryn McGuire as Sylvia Morton
- Edwin Stevens as Reggie Morton
- Lloyd Whitlock as Leonard Hunt
- Edward Kimball as Papa Bonelli

== Production ==
During the filming of A Woman of Bronze Vidor was invited to join Samuel Goldwyn Productions, with whom he would make two pictures: Three Wise Fools (1923) and Wild Oranges (1924).

== Reception ==
“A heavy emotional drama” as reported by Moving Picture World, 14 April 1923)
