= Whispering Devils =

1920 silent film

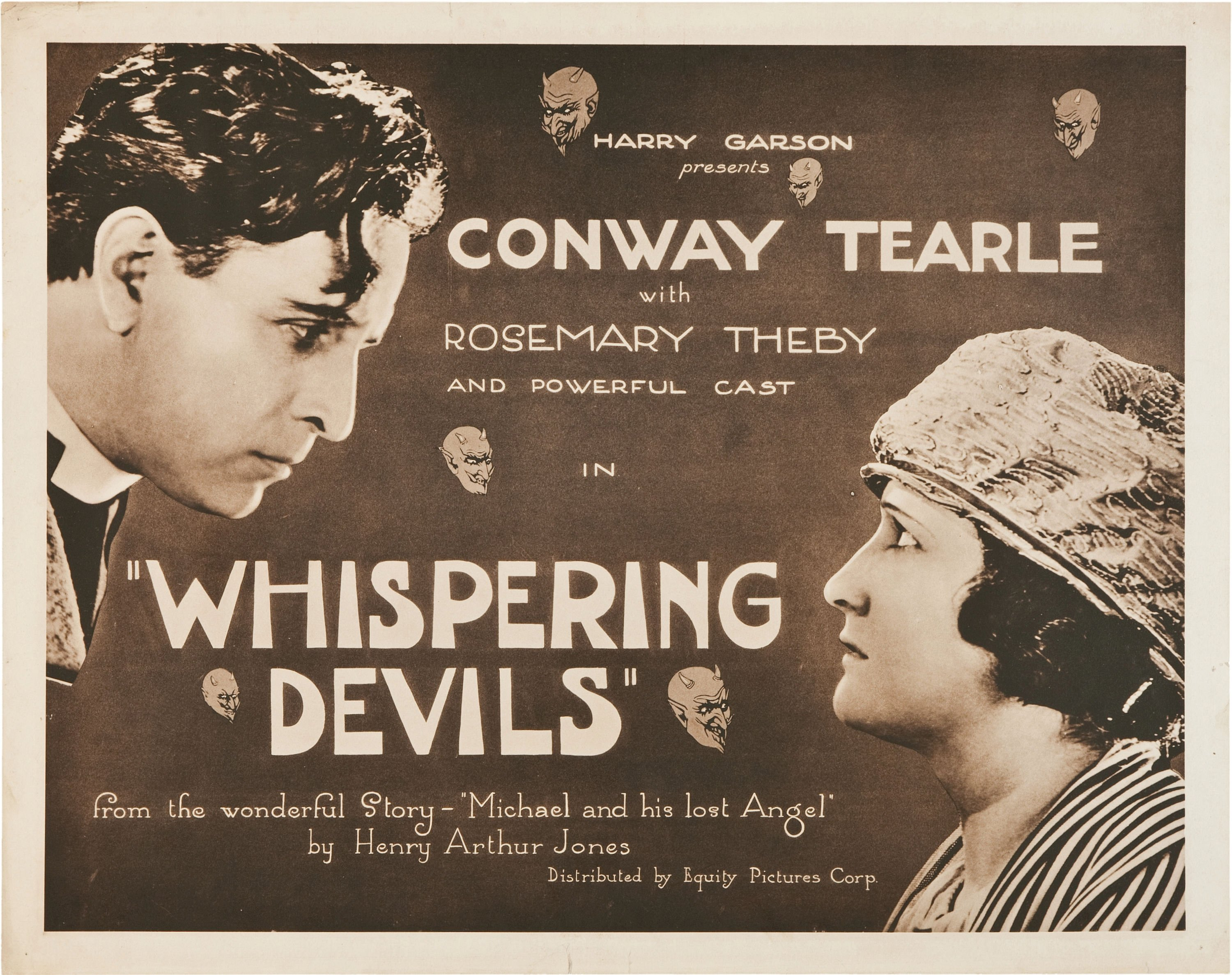
- Directed by: Harry Garson
- Based on: Michael and His Lost Angel by Henry Arthur Jones
- Produced by: Harry Garson
- Starring: Conway Tearle; Rosemary Theby; Esther Ralston
- Cinematography: Tony Gaudio
- Production company: Harry Garson Productions
- Distributed by: Equity Pictures
- Release date: October 25, 1920
- Running time: 60 minutes
- Country: United States
- Languages: Silent; English intertitles

Whispering Devils is a 1920 American silent drama film directed by Harry Garson and starring Conway Tearle, Rosemary Theby and Esther Ralston. It is based on the 1896 play Michael and His Lost Angel by the British writer Henry Arthur Jones.

== Cast ==
- Conway Tearle as Rev. Michael Faversham
- Rosemary Theby as Audrey Lesden
- Sam Sothern as Andrew Gibbard (*Sam Sothern, posthumous role)
- Esther Ralston as Rose Gibbard
- Warren Millais as Bob
- Lenore Lynard as Mrs. Deane
- Walter Bytell as Rev. Dockwray
- Hal Wilson as Whitycombe

== Preservation ==
With no holdings located in archives, Whispering Devils is currently lost.

== Bibliography ==
- Goble, Alan. The Complete Index to Literary Sources in Film. Walter de Gruyter, 1999.
