= The Hands of Nara =

1922 film

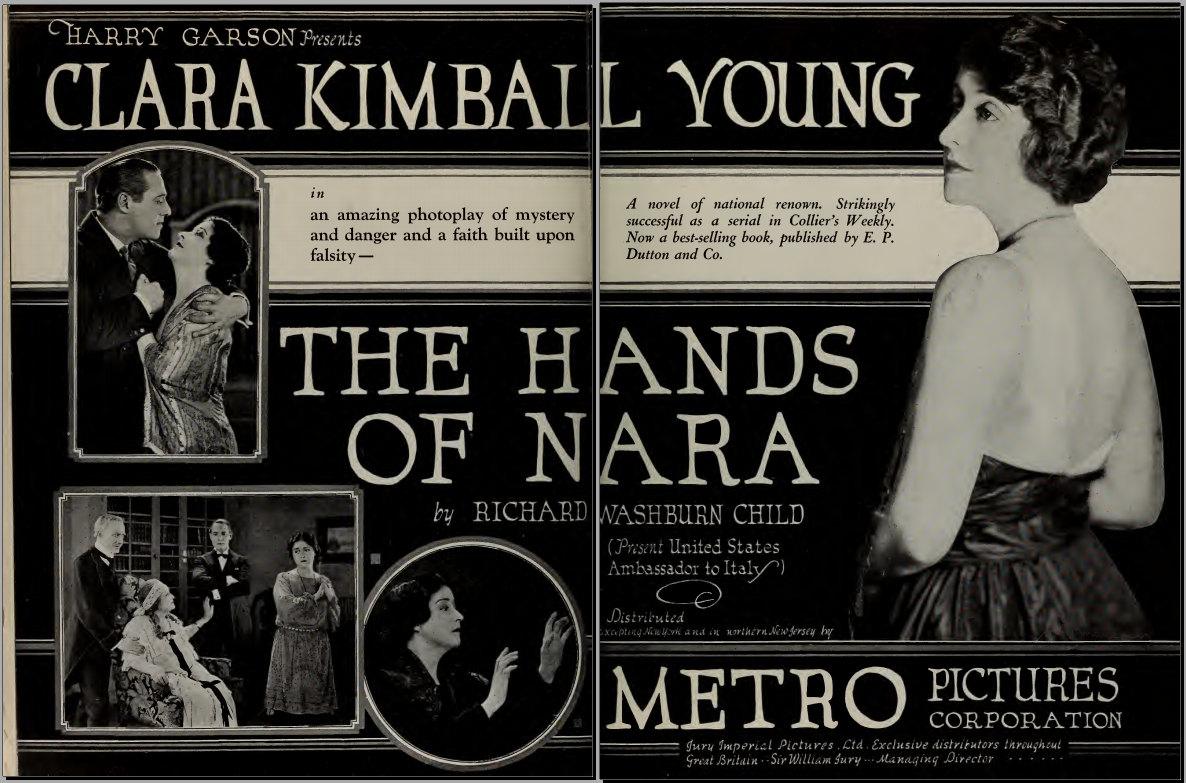
- Directed by: Harry Garson
- Based on: The Hands of Nara by Richard Washburn Child
- Produced by: Harry Garson
- Starring: Clara Kimball Young; Elliott Dexter; Vernon Steele
- Cinematography: L. William O'Connell
- Production company: Samuel Zierler Photoplay Corporation
- Distributed by: Metro Pictures
- Release date: August 26, 1922
- Running time: 70 minutes
- Country: United States
- Languages: Silent; English intertitles

The Hands of Nara is a 1922 American silent drama film directed by Harry Garson and starring Clara Kimball Young, Elliott Dexter and Vernon Steele. It is based on the novel of the same title by Richard Washburn Child.

== Cast ==
- Clara Kimball Young as Nara Alexieff
- Count John Orloff as Boris Alexieff
- Elliott Dexter as Emlen Claveloux
- Edwin Stevens as Connor Lee
- Vernon Steele as Adam Pine
- John Miltern as Dr. Haith Clavelous
- Margaret Loomis as Emma Gammell
- Martha Mattox as Mrs. Miller
- Dulcie Cooper as Carrie Miller
- Edward Cooper as Gus Miller
- Myrtle Stedman as Vanessa Yates
- Eugenie Besserer as Mrs. Claveloux

== Bibliography ==
- Connelly, Robert B. The Silents: Silent Feature Films, 1910-36, Volume 40, Issue 2. December Press, 1998.
- Munden, Kenneth White. The American Film Institute Catalog of Motion Pictures Produced in the United States, Part 1. University of California Press, 1997.
