= The Rise of Susan =

1916 film by Stanner E.V. Taylor

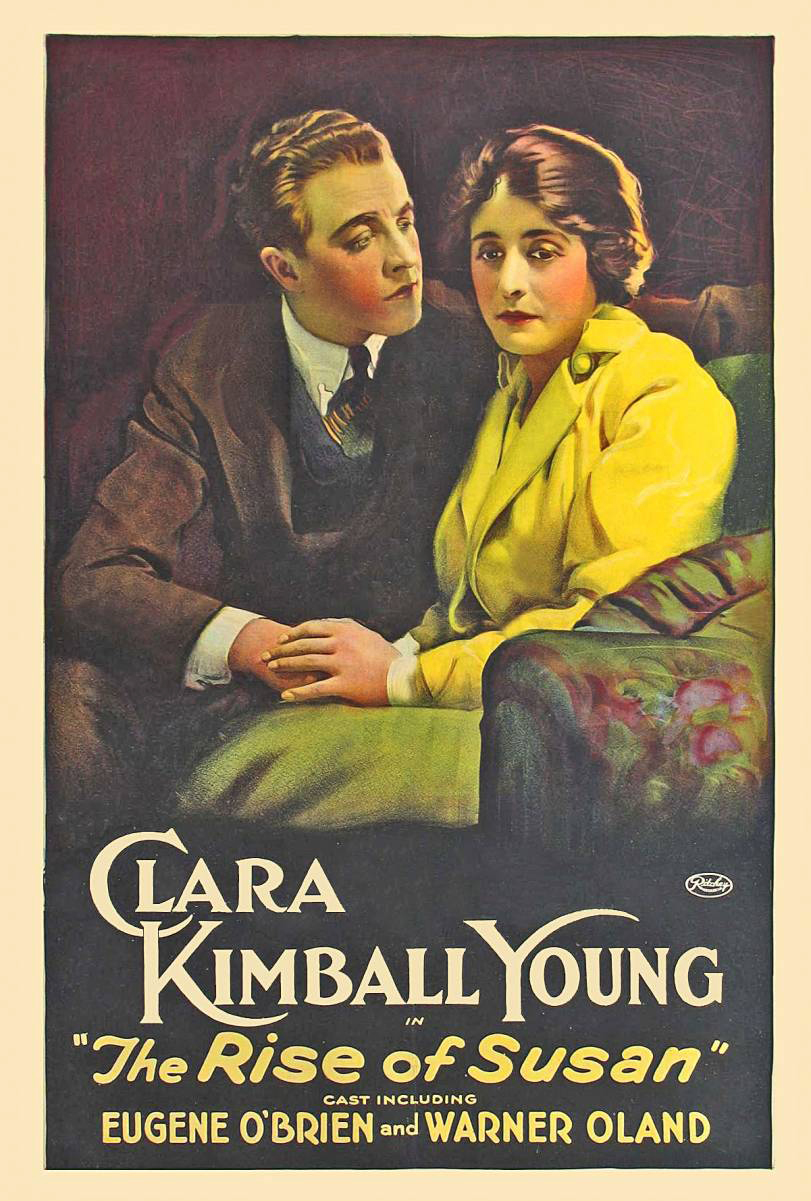
- Lobby poster.
- Directed by: Stanner E. V. Taylor
- Written by: Frances Marion
- Starring: Clara Kimball Young
- Cinematography: Hal Young
- Distributed by: World Film Company
- Release date: December 18, 1916
- Running time: 5 reels
- Country: United States
- Language: Silent (English intertitles)

The Rise of Susan is a 1916 American silent film made by the Peerless Film Company and distributed by World Film which starred Clara Kimball Young. Remnants of a print survive in the Library of Congress missing several reels. A fuller version may exist at the George Eastman Museum.

== Cast ==
- Clara Kimball Young - Susan
- Jennie Dickerson - Mrs. Joseph Luckett
- Warner Oland - Sinclair La Salle
- Marguerite Skirvin - Ninon
- Eugene O'Brien - Clavering Gordon
