= Charge It =

1921 film

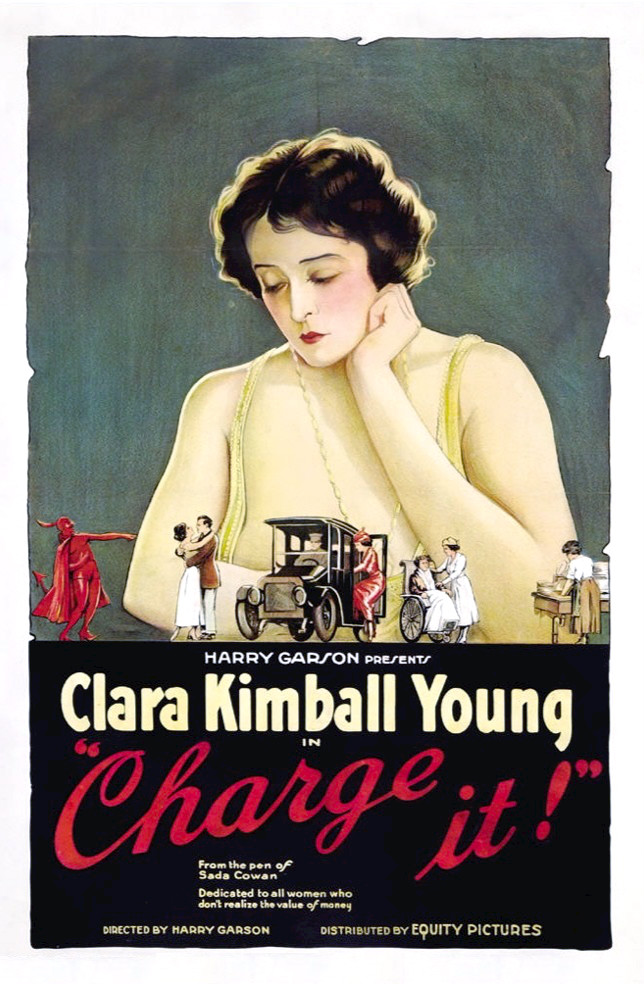
- Film poster
- Directed by: Harry Garson
- Written by: Sada Cowan
- Produced by: Equity Pictures; Harry Garson
- Cinematography: Jacques Bizeul(fr)
- Distributed by: Jans Film Service
- Release date: June 11, 1921
- Running time: 70 minutes
- Country: United States
- Language: Silent..English titles

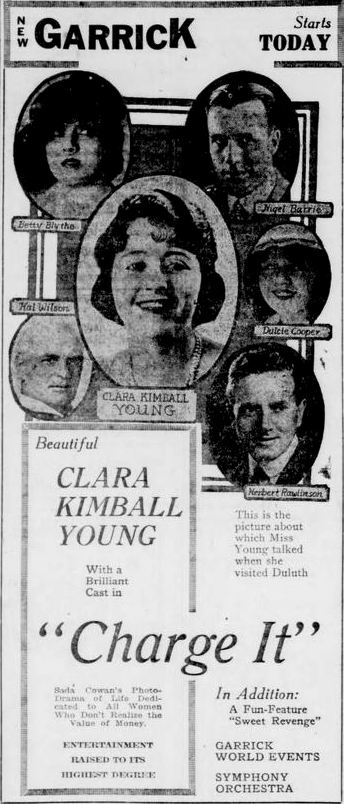
newspaper advert

Charge It is a 1921 American silent drama film directed by Harry Garson and starring Clara Kimball Young.

== Cast ==
- Clara Kimball Young - Julia Lawrence
- Herbert Rawlinson - Philip Lawrence
- Edward M. Kimball - Tom Garreth
- Betty Blythe - Mille Garreth
- Nigel Barrie - Dana Herrick
- Hal Wilson - Robert McGregor
- Dulcie Cooper - Rose McGregor

== Preservation status ==
- A 16mm copy is preserved in the UCLA Film & Television Archive. Tinted 35mm prints of reels 1, 2, 3 and 7 are held at Chicago Film Archives.
