= The Better Wife =

1919 film by William P.S. Earle

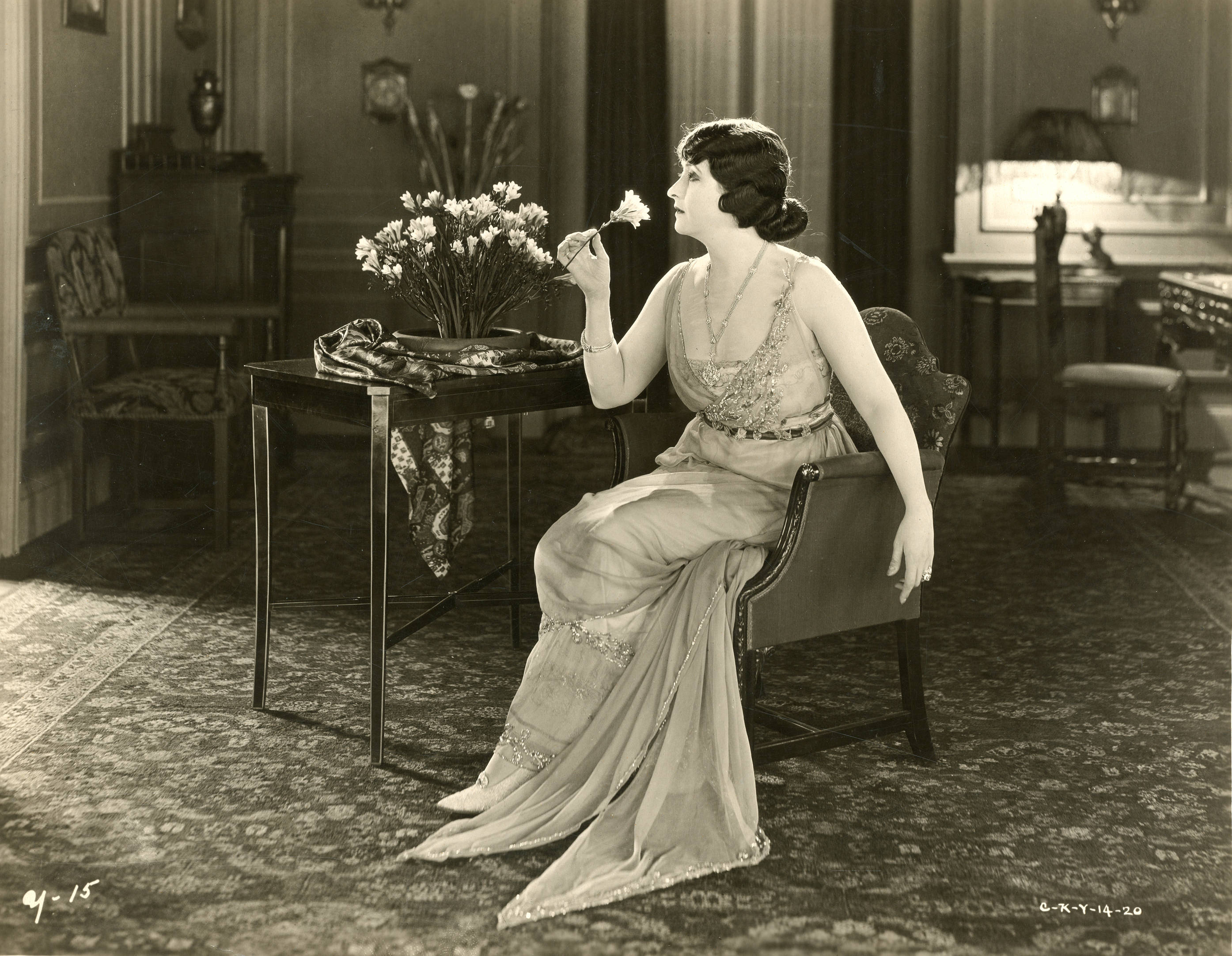
- Film still
- Directed by: William P. S. Earle
- Story by: Lenore J. Coffee
- Starring: Clara Kimball Young; Edward Kimball
- Cinematography: Arthur Edeson
- Production company: Clara Kimball Young Film Corporation
- Distributed by: Select Pictures
- Release date: July 13, 1919 (U.S.)
- Running time: 50 minutes
- Country: United States
- Language: Silent (English intertitles)

The Better Wife is a 1919 American silent drama film directed by William P. S. Earle and starring Clara Kimball Young and Edward Kimball.

== Cast ==
- Clara Kimball Young as Charmian Page
- Edward Kimball as Mr. Page
- Nigel Barrie as Sir Richard Beverly
- Kathlyn Williams as Lady Beverly
- Ben Alexander as Little Dick
- Lillian Walker as Helen Kingdom
- Barbara Tennant as Mrs. Kingdon
- Irving Cummings as Comte de Cheveral

== Reception ==
Variety's review found the film to be average, and had praise for the cinematography and acting but found the story to have "little story and less action."

== Preservation ==
With no copies of The Better Wife located in any film archives, it is a lost film.
