= Straight from Paris =

1921 film

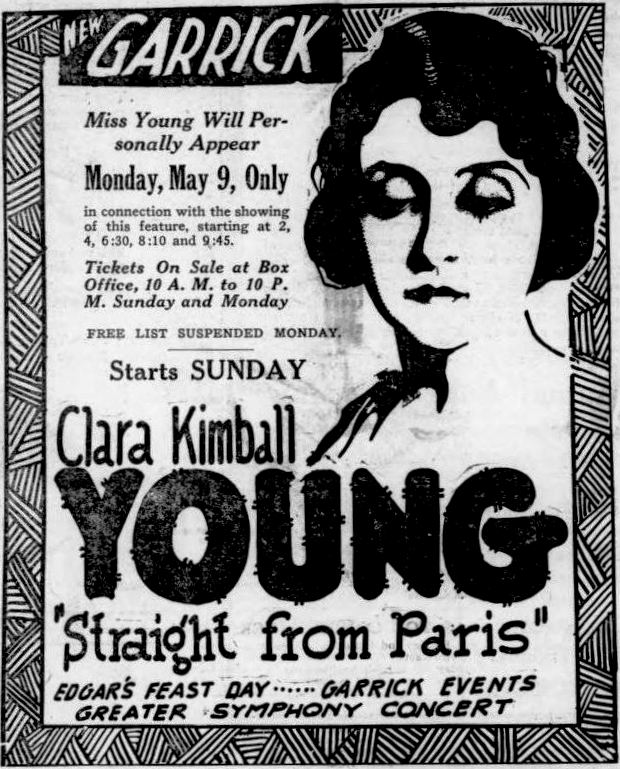
- Directed by: Harry Garson
- Written by: Sada Cowan
- Produced by: Harry Garson
- Starring: Clara Kimball Young; Bertram Grassby; Betty Francisco
- Production company: Equity Pictures
- Distributed by: Equity Pictures
- Release date: May 1921
- Running time: 60 minutes
- Country: United States
- Languages: Silent; English intertitles

Straight from Paris is a 1921 American silent comedy film directed by Harry Garson and starring Clara Kimball Young, Bertram Grassby and Betty Francisco. A print of Straight from Paris exists.

== Cast ==
- Clara Kimball Young as Lucette Grenier
- Bertram Grassby as Robert Van Austen
- William P. Carleton as John Van Austen
- Betty Francisco as Doris Charming
- Thomas Jefferson as Henri Trevel
- Gerard Alexander as Mrs. Stevenson
- Clarissa Selwynne as Mrs. Van Austen

== Bibliography ==
- Connelly, Robert B. The Silents: Silent Feature Films, 1910-36, Volume 40, Issue 2. December Press, 1998.
- Munden, Kenneth White. The American Film Institute Catalog of Motion Pictures Produced in the United States, Part 1. University of California Press, 1997.
