= Arthur Edeson =

American cinematographer (1891–1970)

Arthur Edeson, A.S.C.
- Promotional portrait
- Born: October 5, 1891; New York City, U.S.
- Died: February 14, 1970 (aged 78); Agoura Hills, California, U.S.
- Occupation: Cinematographer
- Years active: 1914–1948
- Title: A.S.C. Founding Member
- Board member of: A.S.C. President (1953–1954)

Arthur Edeson, A.S.C. (October 24, 1891 – February 14, 1970) was an American cinematographer. Born in New York City, his career ran from the formative years of the film industry in New York, through the silent era in Hollywood, and the sound era there in the 1930s and 1940s. His work included many landmarks in film history, including The Thief of Bagdad (1924), All Quiet on the Western Front (1930), Frankenstein (1931), The Maltese Falcon (1941), and Casablanca (1942). He was one of the founders of the American Society of Cinematographers, and was nominated for three Academy Awards in his career in cinema.

== Career ==
Edeson began his career as a still photographer, but turned to movies in 1911 as a camera operator at the American Éclair Studio in Fort Lee, New Jersey when it and many other early film studios in America's first motion picture industry were based there at the beginning of the 20th century.

When the Éclair Studio was reorganized as the World Film Company, he was promoted to chief cinematographer assigned to the star Clara Kimball Young. Throughout the twenties, Edeson photographed a number of important films, including Douglas Fairbanks' Robin Hood (1922) and The Thief of Bagdad (1924), and the groundbreaking special effects film The Lost World (1925).

When sound came in, Edeson experimented with camouflaging the microphones in exterior shots. In Old Arizona (1929), the first sound film to be shot outside a studio, provided evidence to Hollywood executives that talking pictures need not be confined to the sound stage. The western The Big Trail (1930), starring John Wayne in his first starring role, was also filmed by Edeson in the 70mm widescreen process, known as "Fox Grandeur".

In the early 1930s, perhaps his most memorable creative partnership was formed with director James Whale, for whom he photographed the first three of Whale's quartet of horror films: Frankenstein (1931), The Old Dark House (1932), and The Invisible Man (1933).

According to critic M.S. Fonseca, Edeson was one of the "master craftsmen" of the old American school. His principal work was on the side of realism, which is considered by most film historians to represent the "zenith of Hollywood photography." Edeson built on the influence of German Expressionism, brought to the America cinema by German cinematographers during the 1920s.

In 1919, Edeson was one of the founders of the American Society of Cinematographers.

Arthur Edeson died on February 14, 1970, in Agoura Hills, California.

== Filmography ==
- A Gentleman from Mississippi (1914)
- The Dollar Mark (1914)
- The Deep Purple (1915)
- Wildfire (1915)
- Hearts in Exile (1915)
- The Master Hand (1915)
- His Brother's Wife (1916)
- The Devil's Toy (1916)
- Miss Petticoats (1916)
- The Gilded Cage (1916)
- Bought and Paid For (1916)
- A Woman Alone (1917)
- A Square Deal (1917)
- The Social Leper (1917)
- The Page Mystery (1917)
- In Again, Out Again (1917)
- The Stolen Paradise (1917)
- The Price of Pride (1917)
- Wild and Woolly (1917)
- Souls Adrift (1917)
- Baby Mine (1917)
- Reaching for the Moon (1917)
- Nearly Married (1917)
- The Road Through the Dark (1918)
- Jack Spurlock, Prodigal (1918)
- The Savage Woman (1918)
- Eyes of Youth (1919)
- The Hushed Hour (1919)
- Cheating Cheaters (1919)
- The Better Wife (1919)
- For the Soul of Rafael (1920)
- Mid-Channel (1920)
- The Forbidden Woman (1920)
- The Three Musketeers (1921)
- Hush (1921)
- Good Women (1921)
- Robin Hood (1922)
- The Worldly Madonna (1922)
- Inez from Hollywood (1924)
- The Thief of Bagdad (1924)
- The Lost World (1925)
- Stella Dallas (1925)
- The Talker (1925)
- Her Sister from Paris (1925)
- One Way Street (1925)
- Waking Up the Town (1925)
- Just Another Blonde (1926)
- Partners Again (1926)
- Sweet Daddies (1926)
- The Bat (1926)
- Subway Sadie (1926)
- The Drop Kick (1927)
- McFadden's Flats (1927)
- The Patent Leather Kid (1927)
- The Gorilla (1927)
- In Old Arizona (1928)
- Me, Gangster 1928
- A Thief in the Dark (1928)
- Romance of the Rio Grande (1929)
- The Cock-Eyed World (1929)
- Girls Gone Wild (1929)
- The Big Trail (1930) (70mm version)
- All Quiet on the Western Front (1930)
- Waterloo Bridge (1931)
- Always Goodbye (1931)
- La Piste des Geants (1931)
- Frankenstein (1931)
- The Man Who Came Back (1931)
- Doctors' Wives (1931)
- Those We Love (1932)
- Fast Companions (1932)
- The Impatient Maiden (1932)
- Strangers of the Evening (1932)
- The Last Mile (1932)
- Flesh (1932)
- The Old Dark House (1932)
- The Big Brain (1933)
- His Double Life (1933)
- The Constant Woman (1933)
- A Study in Scarlet (1933)
- The Life of Jimmy Dolan (1933)
- The Invisible Man (1933)
- Here Comes the Navy (1934)
- The Merry Frinks (1934)
- Palooka (1934)
- Mutiny on the Bounty (1935)
- While the Patient Slept (1935)
- Maybe it's Love (1935)
- Dinky (1935)
- Devil Dogs of the Air (1935)
- Gold Diggers of 1937 (1936)
- China Clipper (1936)
- Hot Money (1936)
- Satan Met a Lady (1936)
- The Golden Arrow (1936)
- Ceiling Zero (1936)
- They Won't Forget (1937)
- Mr. Dodd Takes the Air (1937)
- Submarine D-1 (1937)
- The Go Getter (1937)
- The Footloose Heiress (1937)
- The Kid Comes Back (1937)
- Racket Busters (1938)
- Swing Your Lady (1938)
- Mr. Chump (1938)
- Cowboy From Brooklyn (1938)
- Each Dawn I Die (1939)
- Kid Nightingale (1939)
- Secret Service of the Air (1939)
- Sweepstakes Winner (1939)
- Wings of the Navy (1939)
- Nancy Drew... Reporter (1939)
- No Place to Go (1939)
- Tugboat Annie Sails Again (1940)
- They Drive by Night (1940)
- Castle on the Hudson (1940)
- Lady with Red Hair (1940)
- The Maltese Falcon (1941)
- Kisses for Breakfast (1941)
- The Male Animal (1942)
- Casablanca (1942)
- Across the Pacific (1942)
- Thank Your Lucky Stars (1943)
- Shine On, Harvest Moon (1944)
- The Mask of Dimitrios (1944)
- The Conspirators (1944)
- The Time, the Place and the Girl (1946)
- Nobody Lives Forever (1946)
- Never Say Goodbye (1946)
- Three Strangers (1946)
- Two Guys from Milwaukee (1946)
- Stallion Road (1947)
- My Wild Irish Rose (1947)
- Two Guys From Texas (1948)
- The Fighting O'Flynn (1948)

== Awards ==
Oscar Nominations

- Academy Awards: Oscar, Best Cinematography, for In Old Arizona, 1929
- Academy Awards: Oscar, Best Cinematography, for All Quiet on the Western Front, 1930
- Academy Awards: Oscar, Best Black and White Cinematography, for Casablanca, 1943

In 1955 and 1957, Edeson was awarded the George Eastman Award, given by George Eastman House for distinguished contribution to the art of film.
