= The College Boob =

1926 film

- Directed by: Harry Garson
- Screenplay by: Gerald Duffy
- Story by: Jack Casey
- Starring: Maurice Bennett Flynn; Jean Arthur; Jimmy Anderson; Bob Steele; Cecil Ogden; Dorothea Wolbert
- Cinematography: James S. Brown Jr.
- Production company: Harry Garson Productions
- Distributed by: Film Booking Offices of America
- Release date: August 15, 1926
- Running time: 60 minutes
- Country: United States
- Language: English

The College Boob is a 1926 American comedy film directed by Harry Garson and written by Gerald Duffy. The film stars Maurice Bennett Flynn, Jean Arthur, Jimmy Anderson, Bob Steele, Cecil Ogden and Dorothea Wolbert. The film was released on August 15, 1926, by Film Booking Offices of America.

== Cast ==
- Maurice Bennett Flynn as Aloysius Appleby
- Jean Arthur as Angela Boothby
- Jimmy Anderson as Horatio Winston Jr.
- Bob Steele as Shorty Buzelle
- Cecil Ogden as Smacky McNeil
- Dorothea Wolbert as Aunt Polly
- William Malan as Uncle Lish
- Ray Turner as Whitewings Washington
