= Hearts in Exile (1915 film) =

1915 film

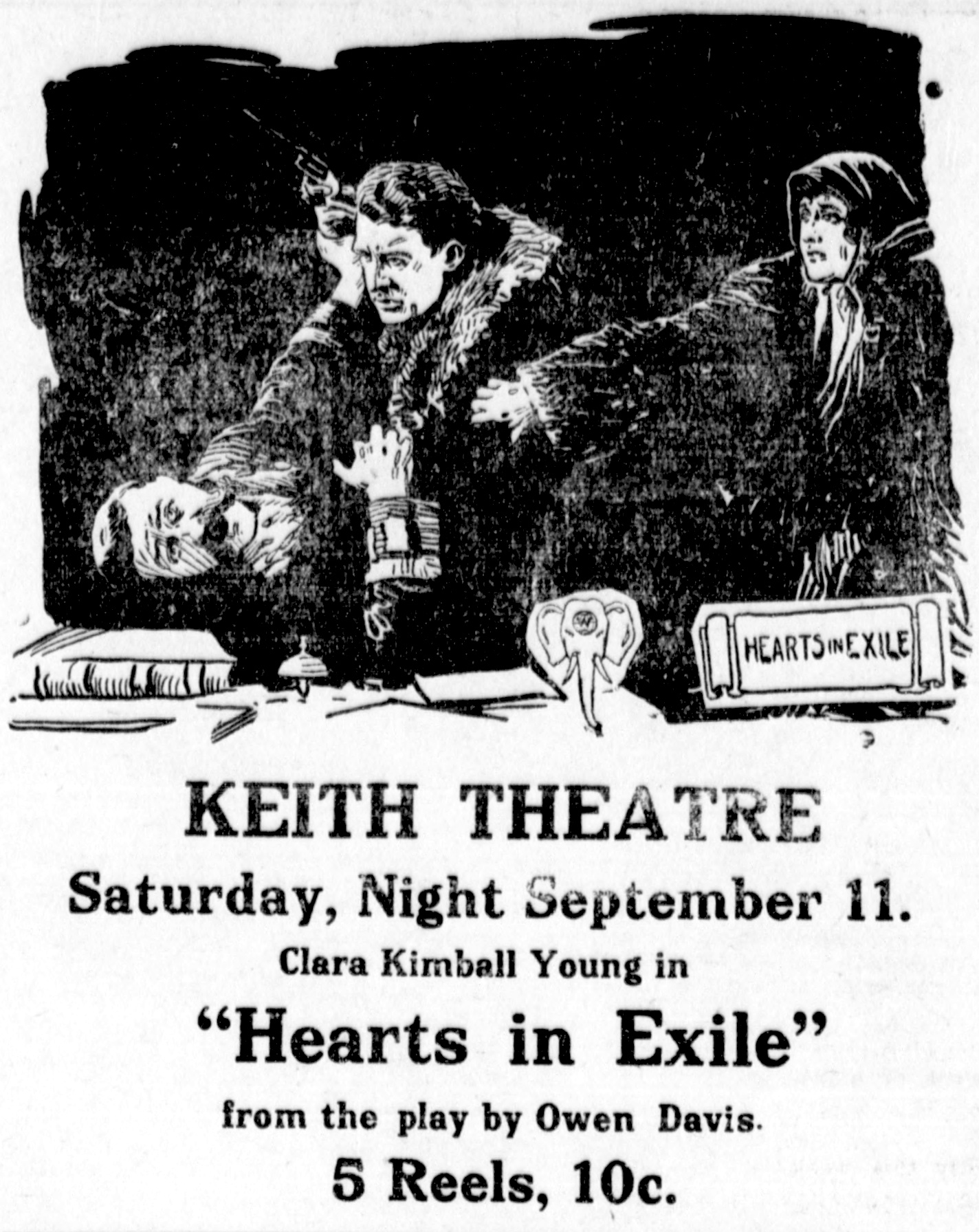
- Newspaper advertisement.
- Directed by: James Young
- Written by: Owen Davis (scenario); James Young (writer)
- Based on: Hearts in Exile by John Oxenham
- Starring: Clara Kimball Young; Montagu Love; Claude Fleming; Vernon Steele
- Cinematography: Arthur Edeson
- Production company: World Film Company
- Distributed by: World Film Company
- Release date: April 12, 1915
- Running time: 59 minutes
- Country: United States
- Language: English

Hearts in Exile is a 1915 American silent drama film directed by James Young, based on the story of the same name by John Oxenham. The film was both produced and distributed by World Film Company. The film is also known as Hearts Afire (American reissue title).

== Cast ==
- Clara Kimball Young as Hope Ivanovna
- Montagu Love as Count Nicolai
- Claude Fleming as Serge Palma
- Vernon Steele as Paul Pavloff
- Frederick Truesdell as Captain Sokaloff
- Paul McAllister as Ivan Mikhail
- Bert Starkey as Victor Rasloff
- Clarissa Selwynne as Madame Romanoff

== Production ==
It was produced at Peerless Pictures Studios when it and many other early film studios in America's first motion picture industry were based in Fort Lee, New Jersey at the beginning of the 20th century.

== Preservation ==
A 28 mm print is held by George Eastman House, gifted by the 3M Foundation in 1977.
