= Clara Kimball Young =

American actress (1890–1960)

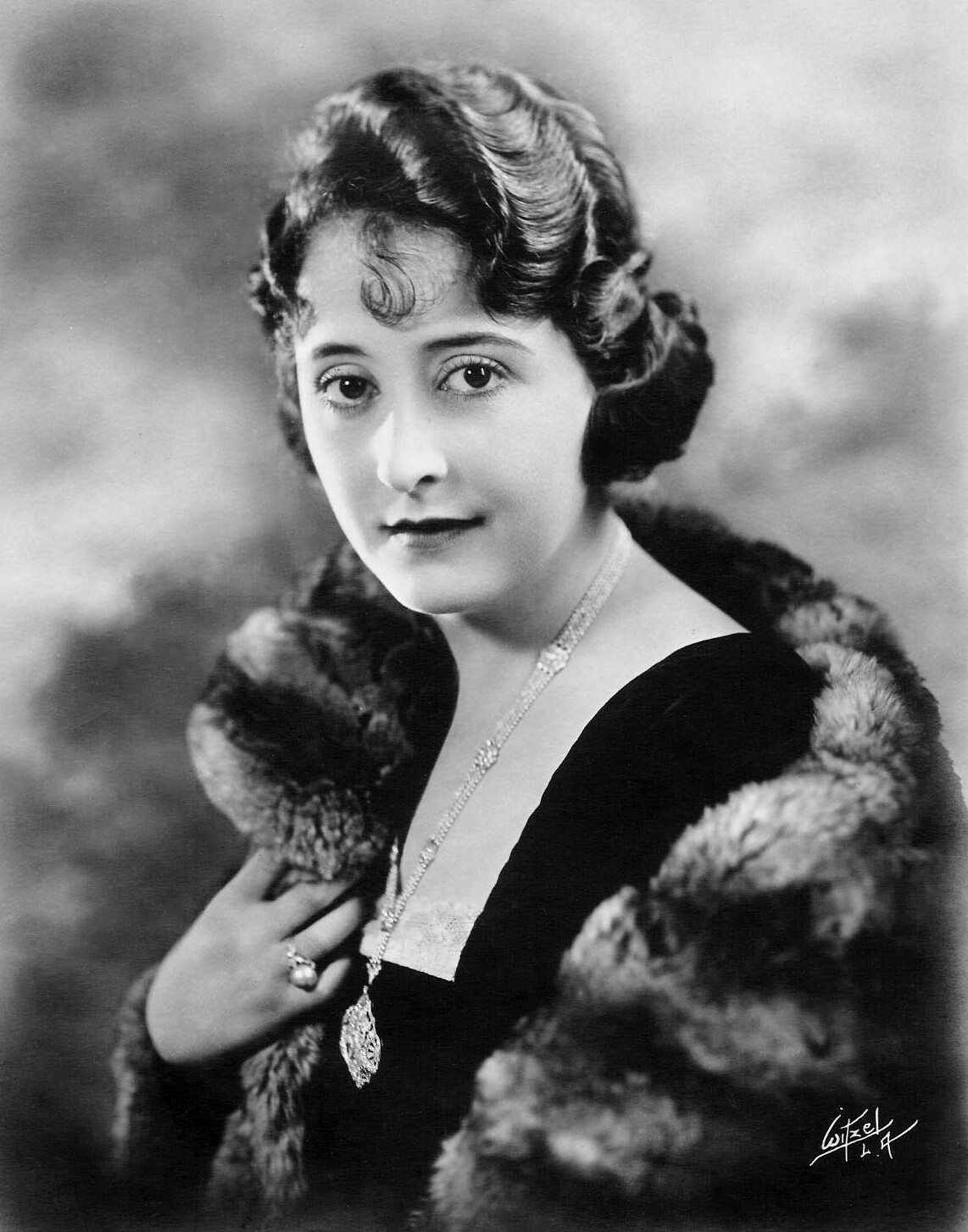
- Young in 1920
- Born: Edith Matilda Clara Kimball; September 6, 1890; Chicago, Illinois, U.S.
- Died: October 15, 1960 (aged 70); Woodland Hills, California, U.S.
- Occupation: Actress
- Years active: 1909–1941
- Spouses: James Young (m. 1910; div. 1919) Harry Garson (m. 1920; div. 1927) Dr. Arthur Fauman (m. 1928; died 1937)
- Parent(s): Edward Kimball; Pauline Kimball

Clara Kimball Young (born Edith Matilda Clara Kimball; September 6, 1890 – October 15, 1960) was an American film actress who was popular in the early silent film era.

== Early life ==
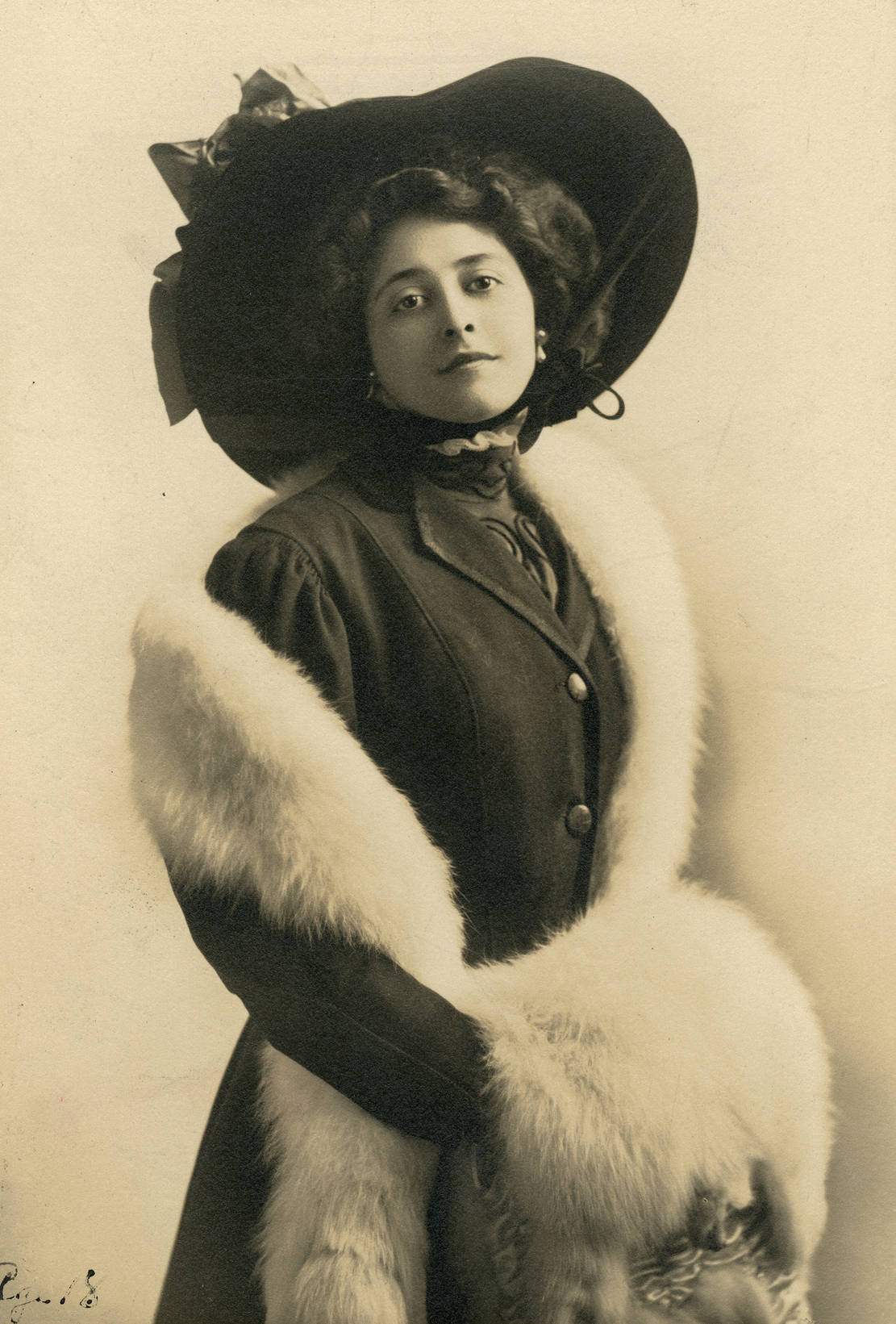
Clara Kimball Young in 1909

Edith Matilda Clara Kimball was born in Chicago on September 6, 1890, the only child to Edward Kimball and Pauline Madeline Kimball (née Garrette, 1860–1919), both of whom were traveling stock actors. She made her stage debut at the age of three, and throughout her early childhood traveled with her parents and acted with their theater company. She attended St. Francis Xavier Academy in Chicago. Afterward, she was hired into a stock company and resumed her stage career, traveling extensively through the United States and playing in various small town theaters.

Early in her career, she met and married a fellow stock company and known Broadway actor named James Young. Young's previous wife had been the songwriter/lyricist Rida Johnson Young. After sending a photograph to Vitagraph Studios, Clara Kimball Young, as she was then known, and her husband were both offered yearly contracts in 1912.

== Career ==
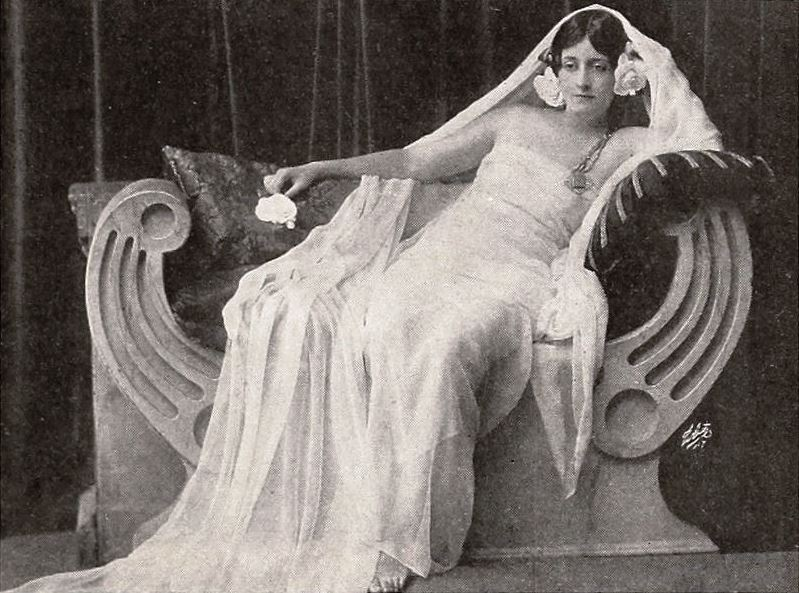
Clara Kimball Young as Marguerite Gautier in Camille, 1915

In the new medium of motion pictures, and without much screen competition, Young's star at Vitagraph rose quickly. Young was predominantly cast in one- and two-reel roles as the virtuous heroine. By 1913, she had become one of the more popular leading ladies at Vitagraph and placed at number 17 in a poll of public popularity. Many of Young's films from her early period with Vitagraph are now lost.

In 1914, Vitagraph released the drama My Official Wife, which starred Young as a Russian revolutionary and was directed by her husband James Young and co-starred the popular leading man Earle Williams. The film, which is now lost, was an enormous success and launched Young and Earle Williams into first place in the popularity polls, and Young immediately was signed to a contract with pioneering mogul Lewis J. Selznick.

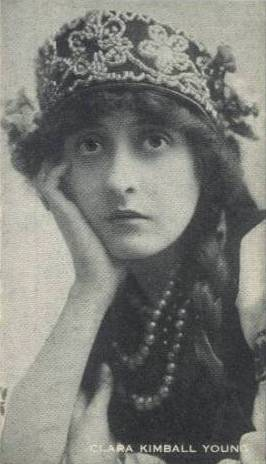
Young, c. 1916

After a string of successful roles, Young was established as one of the chief attractions of World Film Corporation and her husband James was now a much sought-after director. By 1915, Young's popularity was equivalent to that of Mary Pickford, Dorothy and Lillian Gish, Pearl White, Edna Purviance, and Mabel Normand.

She became involved in a much publicized affair with Selznick, culminating in a 1916 divorce suit accusing her of alienation of affection. James Young finally obtained a final decree on April 8, 1919, on grounds of desertion.

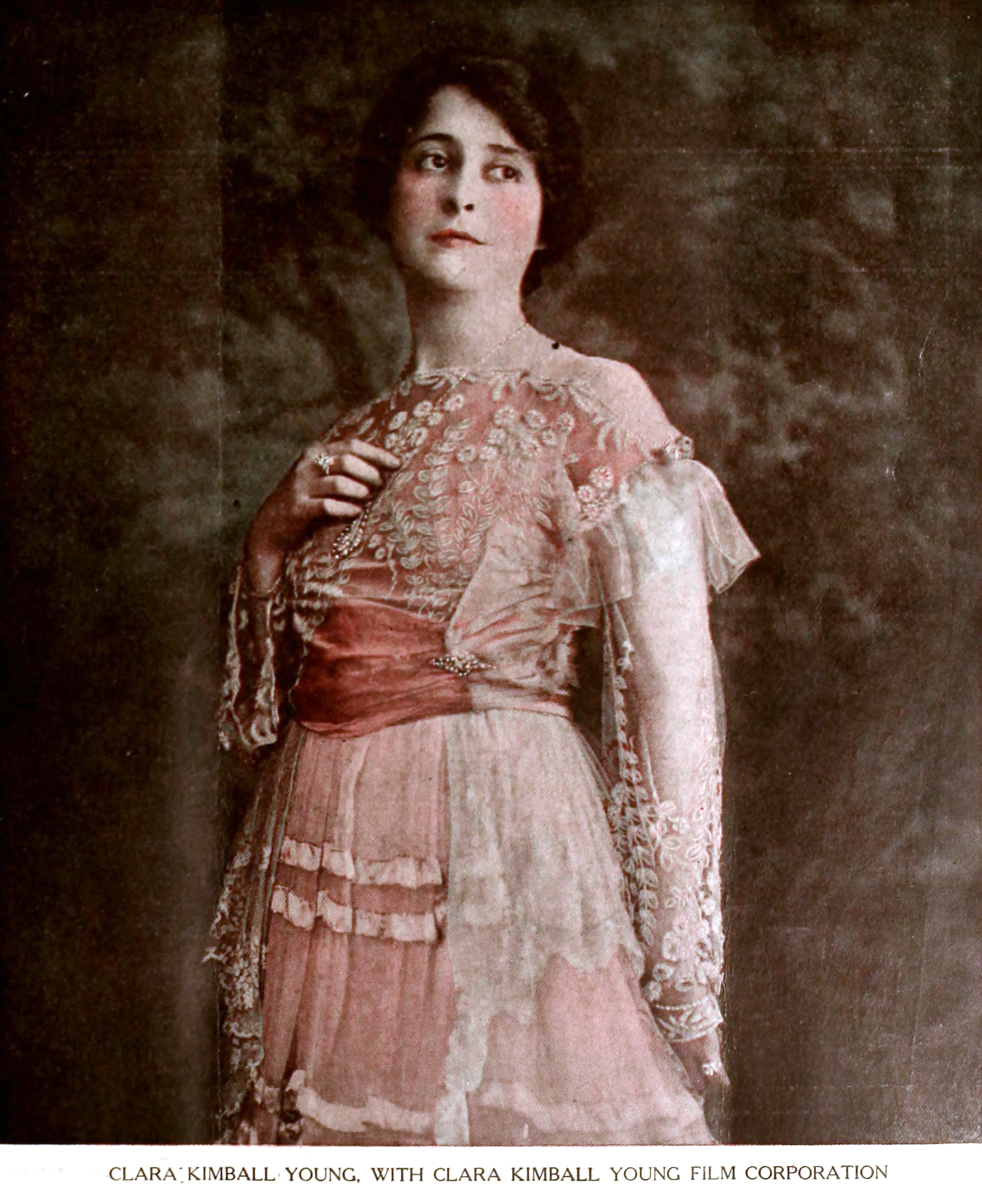
Clara Kimball Young, with Clara Kimball Young Film Corporation, October 1916

Selznick quickly formed the Clara Kimball Young Film Corporation, installing himself as president, and formed Selznick Productions to distribute her films and those of some other independent producers. After only four films with Selznick however, the personal and business relationship began to sour, and Young struggled to extricate herself from all business arrangements with Selznick, accusing him of defrauding her of her profits through a series of dummy corporations and by electing himself president of her company while not permitting her any input in her business affairs.

In 1917, Young became involved in an affair with Harry Garson, with whom she then teamed in a business venture. Garson had little experience in the motion picture business, and as a result, Young's career began to sputter. Although she remained a popular actress into the early 1920s, Young suffered at the inexperience and alleged mismanagement and apathy of Garson. In her 1921 diary, Young wrote "It will be wonderful to get out of debt and finish these three pictures for equity. I feel as though I had my head on a block and was waiting for the axe to descend at any moment."

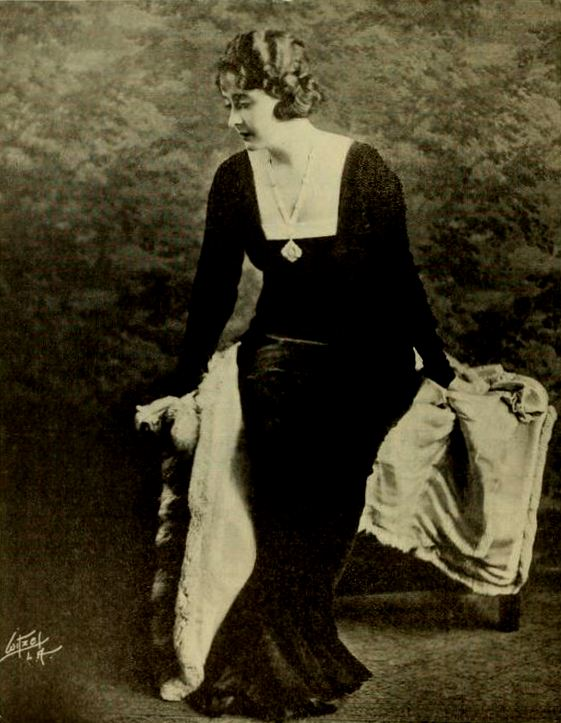
Young in May 1919

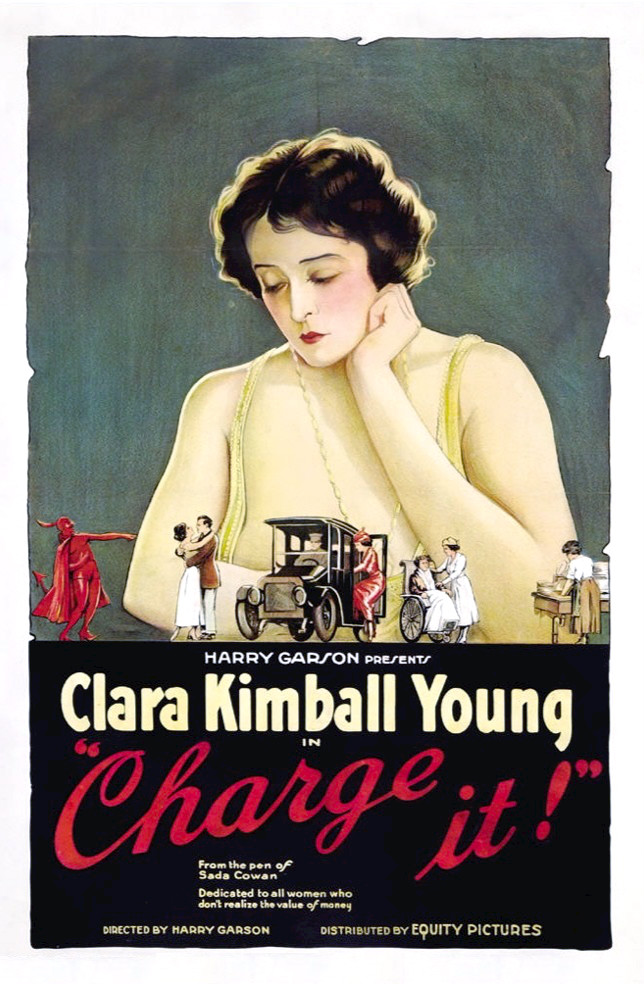
Starring in Charge It for Equity Pictures (1921)

She began suffering a series of press attacks for her business dealings and personal relationship with Garson. By 1925, her stardom began to fade, and she made her last silent film Lying Wives. Young spent the remainder of the 1920s performing in vaudeville, and in 1928 quietly married Dr. Arthur Fauman. The advent of sound briefly revived her career, and she appeared in several featured roles for RKO Radio Pictures and Tiffany Pictures with only modest success, appearing only in bit parts including a Three Stooges short, and extra roles in mostly lower budget pictures and having a stint on radio. One of her bigger roles is in the murder mystery The Rogues Tavern (1936) where she plays a sweet but fussy motherly woman who is hiding a very big secret.

She retired from acting in 1941.

== Death ==
Young underwent minor surgery to correct a chronic bronchial problem in March 1960. She did not recover her health after the surgery, and became increasingly frail. Young died of a stroke at the Motion Picture House in Woodland Hills, California on October 15, 1960. Her remains were cremated, and she was interred at Grand View Memorial Park Cemetery in Glendale, California. For her contribution to the motion picture industry, Young was given a star on the Hollywood Walk of Fame at 6513 Hollywood Blvd.

== Selected filmography ==
=== Short subjects ===
Year	Title	Role	Notes
1909	Washington Under the British Flag		Lost film
1909	Washington Under the American Flag		Lost film
1909	A Midsummer Night's Dream	Penelope	
1910	Richelieu; or: The Conspiracy		Lost film
1910	Uncle Tom's Cabin		Lost film
1910	The Sepoy's Wife	The Sepoy's Wife	
1910	Ransomed; or, A Prisoner of War	Captain Jack's Wife	Status unknown
1910	The Last of the Saxons	Aldyth	Lost film
1911	Lady Godiva	Coventry resident praying	
1912	Cardinal Wolsey	Anne Boleyn	Incomplete film
1912	The Haunted Rocker	Madge Boggs, the Daughter	
1912	The Jocular Winds of Fate	Alice De Voe	Status unknown
1912	The Pipe	Dingley's Wife	Status unknown
1912	The Old Kent Road	Sue Simmonds, Their Daughter	Status unknown
1912	Dr. LaFleur's Theory	the Criminal's Moll	Status unknown
1912	Professor Optimo	Clara	Lost film
1912	The Picture Idol	Beth Ward, a Passionate Fan of Howard Hanson's	Status unknown
1912	Mockery	Princess Dolorosa	Status unknown
1912	Half a Hero	Mabel Kemp	Status unknown
1912	Lulu's Doctor	Aunt Madge Marion	
1912	When Roses Wither	Howard's Wife	Status unknown
1912	Lincoln's Gettysburys Address		Lost film
1912	The Troublesome Step-Daughters	Assistant in the Toy Shop	Lost film
1912	The Money Kings		Status unknown
1912	A Lively Affair	Dorothy, the Maid	
1912	Rock of Ages		Status unknown
1912	Wanted, a Sister	Evelyn Marshall	Lost film
1912	Popular Betty	Betty Wilson	Status unknown
1912	A Vitagraph Romance	Caroline, the Senator's Daughter	Lost film
1912	The Irony of Fate		Status unknown
1912	Mrs. Lirriper's Lodgers	Mrs. Edson	Status unknown
1912	A Mistake in Spelling	Mabel Moore, Fred's Fiancée	Status unknown
1912	Poet and Peasant	Toinette Savard, the Daughter	Status unknown
1912	Lord Browning and Cinderella	Cinderella	Status unknown
1912	In the Flat Above	Priscilla Putnam, a Music Teacher	Status unknown
1912	The Eavesdropper	Alice	Status unknown
1913	Love Hath Wrought a Miracle	Rose Graham	Status unknown
1913	The Little Minister	Lady Babbie	Lost film
1913	The Interrupted Honeymoon	Mrs. Adele Young, the Wife	Status unknown
1913	What a Change of Clothes Did	John Mason's Fiancée	
1913	The Volunteer Strike Breakers	Harris's Fiancée	Status unknown
1913	When Mary Grew Up	Mary	Status unknown
1913	Beau Brummel	Helen Ballarat	Lost film
1913	The Old Guard	Melanie	
1913	Put Yourself in Their Place	Mr. Kent's Daughter	Status unknown
1913	The Way Out	Emma Bindley – a Spinster	Status unknown
1913	Getting Up a Practice	Emily Irving, Dr. Lyons' Sweetheart	Status unknown
1913	The Mystery of the Stolen Child	The Nurse	Status unknown
1913	Mr. Mintern's Misadventures	Muriel Leach	Status unknown
1913	The Mystery of the Stolen Jewels	First Thief	Status unknown
1913	The Wrath of Osaka	Miro	Status unknown
1913	The White Slave; or, The Octoroon	Zoe – the Octoroon	Status unknown
1913	Delayed Proposals	Marion Van Sicklen	Status unknown
1913	Jack's Chrysanthemum	Kichimatsu, a Japanese Maiden	Status unknown
1913	The Spirit of the Orient	Normallee	Status unknown
1913	The Taming of Betty	Betty	Status unknown
1913	A Faithful Servant	Nina, Count Gullio's Sweetheart	Status unknown
1913	A Maid of Mandalay	Ma May	Status unknown
1913	The Lonely Princess	The Princess, Prince Raffaello's Daughter	Status unknown
1913	When Women Go on the Warpath; or, Why Jonesville Went Dry	Minor Role	Status unknown
1913	Cupid Versus Women's Rights	Madge Trenton	Status unknown
1913	The Hindoo Charm	Phyllis – the Step-Mother	Status unknown
1913	John Tobin's Sweetheart	Minor Role	Lost film
1913	Extremities	Gladys Robinson	Status unknown
1913	The Test	Eleanor Anstruther	Status unknown
1913	The Pirates	Helen Merwin	Status unknown
1913	On Their Wedding Eve	Edna Morvell	Status unknown
1913	Jerry's Mother-In-Law	Jerry's Wife	Status unknown
1913	Fellow Voyagers	Jerry's Wife	Status unknown
1913	Betty in the Lions' Den	Betty	Status unknown
1913	A Lesson in Jealousy	Mabel – the Wife	Status unknown
1913	Beauty Unadorned	Helen Preston	Incomplete film
1913	Love's Sunset	Nita Travers	Status unknown
1913	Up in a Balloon	Betty Simpson	Status unknown
1914	The Perplexed Bridegroom	Lucy Demly, the Bride	Status unknown
1914	Goodness Gracious	Gwendoline	Status unknown
1914	Some Steamer Scooping	Clara Lane, a Journalist	Status unknown
1914	Her Husband	Dora Allen, Mrs. Tom Harcourt	Status unknown
1914	The Silver Snuff Box	Amy, Julian's Granddaughter	Status unknown
1914	The Awakening of Barbara Dare	Dorothy Clayton	Status unknown
1914	The Violin of M'sieur	Yvonne – Gerome's Daughter	Status unknown
1914	Happy-Go-Lucky	Happy-Go-Lucky	Status unknown
1914	David Garrick	Ada Ingot	Status unknown
1914	Taken by Storm	Betty, the Willful Wife	Status unknown
1916	A Race for Life		Status unknown
1935	Hollywood Extra Girl	Grace	Documentary
1936	Ants in the Pantry	Mrs. Beulah Burlap	
1936	Love in September	Mrs. Thompson	
1937	New News	Mrs. Van Gage	

=== Features ===
Year	Title	Role	Notes
1914	My Official Wife	Helene Marie	Lost film
1914	The Fates and Flora Fourflush	Flora Fourflush	Film serial Lost film
1914	Lola	Lola Barnhelun	
1915	The Deep Purple	Doris Moore	Lost film
1915	Hearts in Exile	Hope Ivanovna	
1915	Marrying Money	Mildred Niles	
1915	Trilby	Trilby O'Ferral	
1915	The Heart of the Blue Ridge	Plutina	Lost film
1915	Camille	Camille	Lost film
1916	The Yellow Passport	Sonia Sokoloff	Lost film
1916	The Feast of Life	Aurora Fernandez	
1916	The Dark Silence	Mildred White	
1916	The Foolish Virgin	Mary Adams	Lost film
1916	The Common Law	Valerie West	Lost film
1916	The Rise of Susan	Susan	Incomplete film
1917	The Price She Paid	Mildred Gower	Lost film
1917	The Easiest Way	Laura Murdock	Lost film
1917	Magda	Magda	Lost film
1917	Shirley Kaye	Shirley Kaye	
1918	The Marionettes	Fernande de Monclars	Lost film
1918	The House of Glass	Margaret Case	Lost film
1918	The Reason Why	Zara Zenova	Lost film
1918	The Claw	Mary Saurin	Lost film
1918	The Savage Woman	Renee Benoit	Lost film
1918	The Road Through the Dark	Gabrielle Jardee	Lost film
1919	Cheating Cheaters	Ruth Brockton	Lost film
1919	The Better Wife	Charmian Page	Lost film
1919	Eyes of Youth	Gina Ashling	
1919	Soldiers of Fortune		Uncredited; Lost film
1920	The Forbidden Woman	Diane Sorel	
1920	For the Soul of Rafael	Marta Raquel Estevan	Lost film
1920	Mid-Channel	Zoe Blundell	
1921	Hush	Vera Stanford	Lost film
1921	Straight from Paris	Lucette Grenier	
1921	Charge It	Julia Lawrence	
1921	What No Man Knows	Norma Harvey	Incomplete film
1922	The Worldly Madonna	Lucy Trevor, Dancer/Janet Trevor, Nun	
1922	The Hands of Nara	Nara Alexieff	Lost film
1922	Enter Madame	Prima Donna Lisa Della Robia	
1923	The Woman of Bronze	Vivian Hunt	Lost film
1923	Cordelia the Magnificent	Cordelia Marlowe	Lost film
1923	A Wife's Romance	Joyce Addisonn	Lost film
1925	Lying Wives	Patricia Chase	
1931	Kept Husbands	Mrs. Henrietta Post	
1931	Mother and Son	Faro Lil	
1931	Women Go on Forever	Daisy Bowman	
1932	Love Bound	Mrs. Jane Randolph	
1932	Probation	Mrs. Humphries	
1933	File 113	Mme. Fauvel	
1934	I Can't Escape	Mrs. Wilson	
1934	Romance in the Rain	Mlle. Fleurette Malevinsky	
1934	The Return of Chandu	Dorothy Regent	
1935	The Drunkard	Mrs. Karns	
1935	She Married Her Boss	Parsons	
1935	His Night Out	Mrs. Davis	
1935	Fighting Youth	Mrs. Stewart, House Mother	
1935	The Fighting Coward	Mrs. Gordon	
1936	Dangerous Waters	Kind Lady Passenger	Uncredited
1936	Three on the Trail	Rose Peters	
1936	The Rogues' Tavern	Mrs. Jamison	
1936	Oh, Susanna	Aunt Peggy Lee	
1936	The Black Coin	Donna Luise Navarro	
1937	They Wanted to Marry	Wedding Guest Talking to Hunter	Uncredited
1937	Hills of Old Wyoming	Ma Hutchins	
1937	Dangerously Yours	Mrs. Prentiss	Uncredited
1937	The Mysterious Pilot	Martha, Fritz's Wife	Film serial Chs.3-5,9,14-15
1938	The Secret of Treasure Island	Cortez Hotel Maid	Film serial Uncredited
1938	The Wages of Sin	Fat Pearl	
1938	The Frontiersmen	Mrs. Peters	
1941	The Round Up	Mrs. Wilson	
1941	Mr. Celebrity	Herself	

== Gallery ==
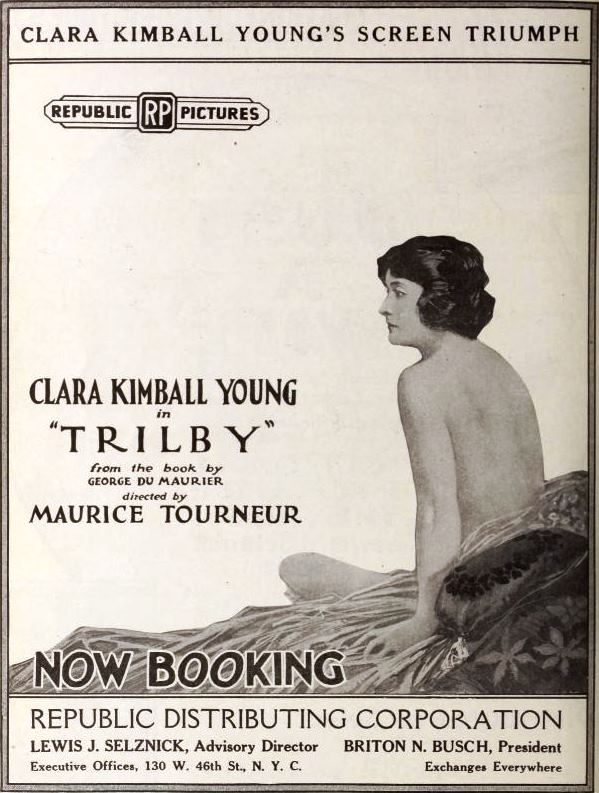
Trilby (1915)

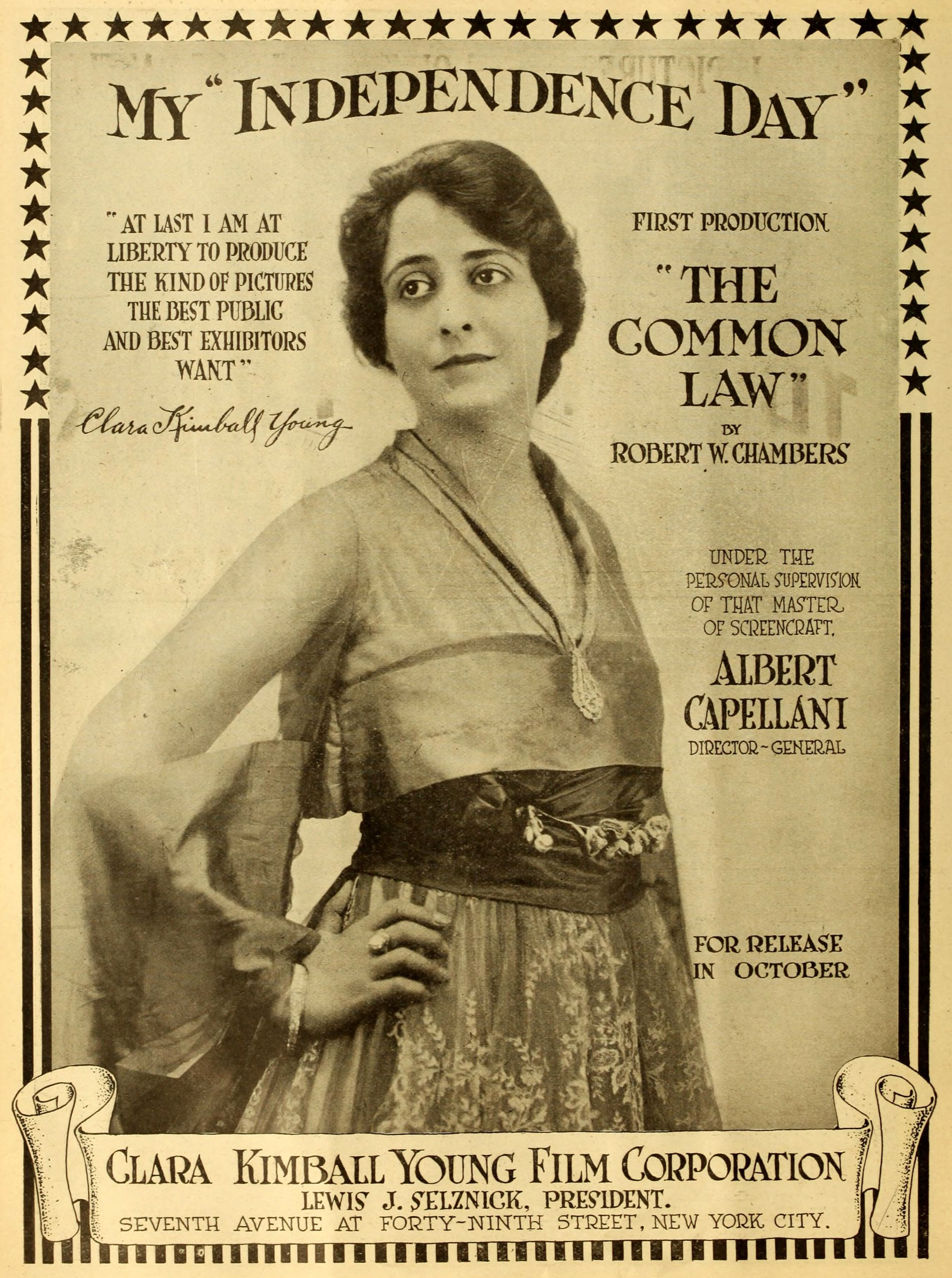
The Common Law, 1916

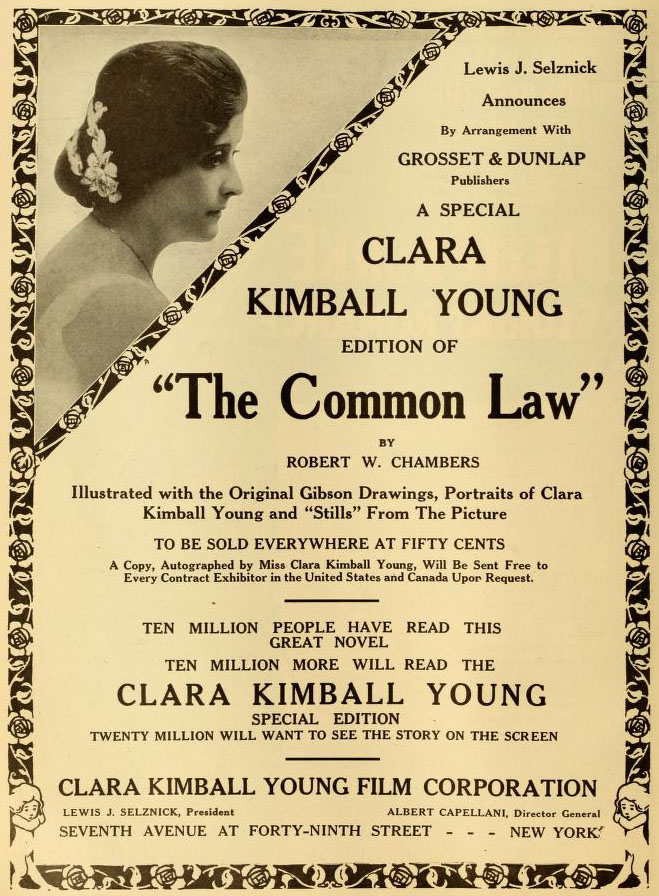
Advertisement, 1916

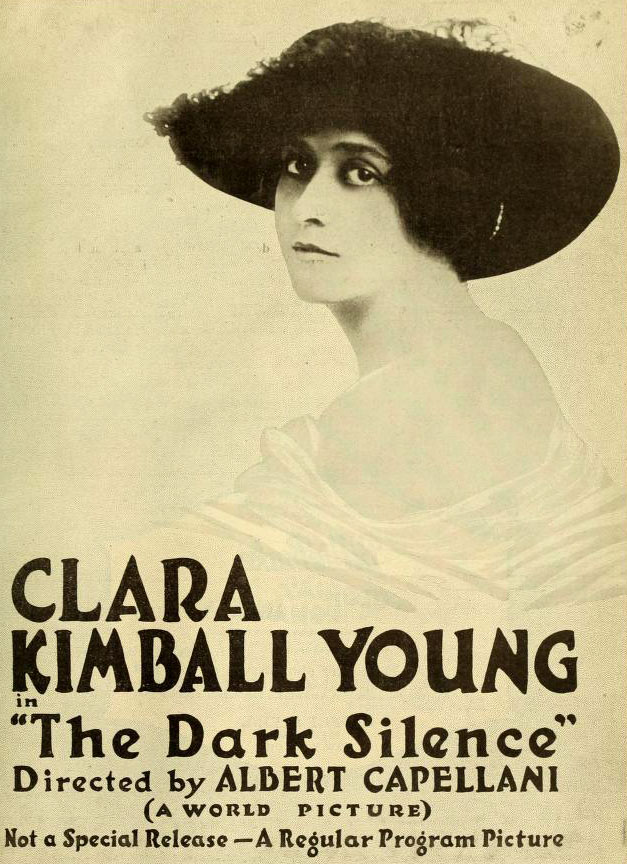
The Dark Silence, 1916

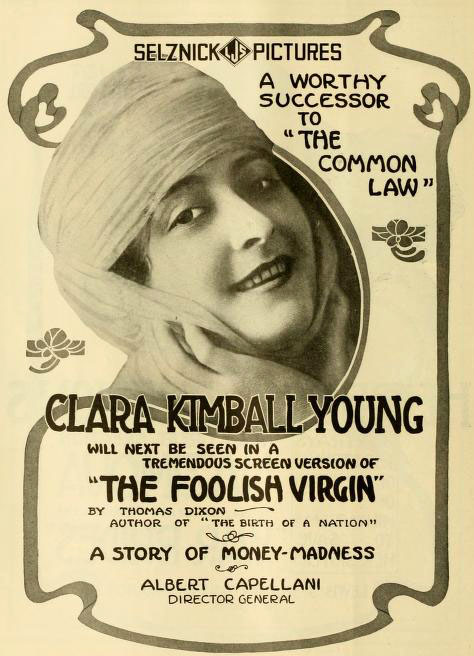
The Foolish Virgin, 1916

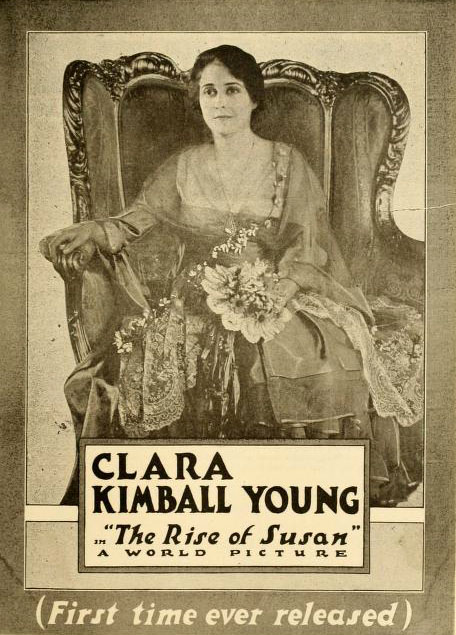
The Rise of Susan, 1917

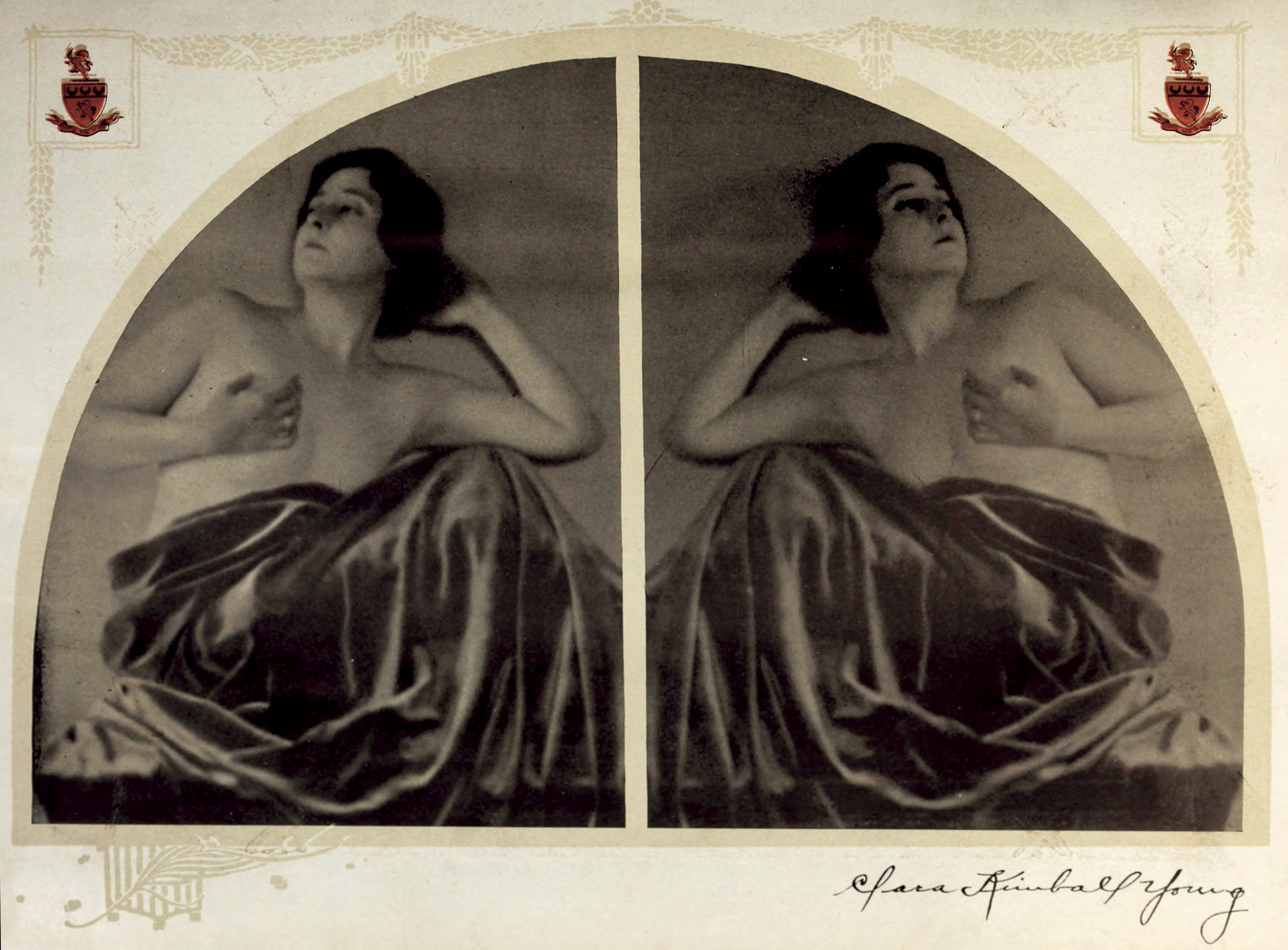
Advertisement, 1917

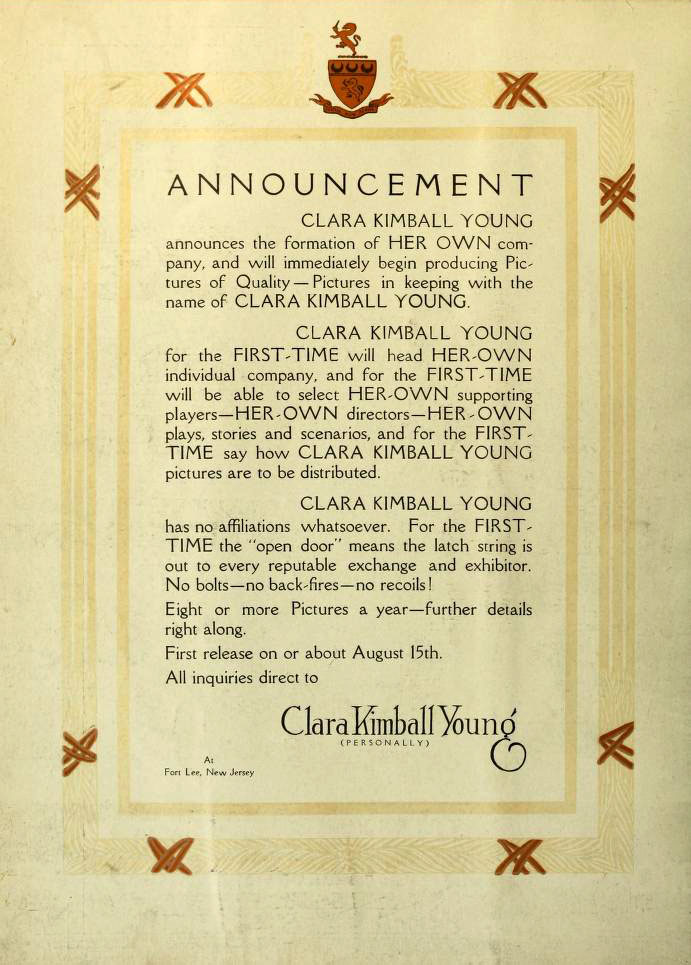
Advertisement, 1917

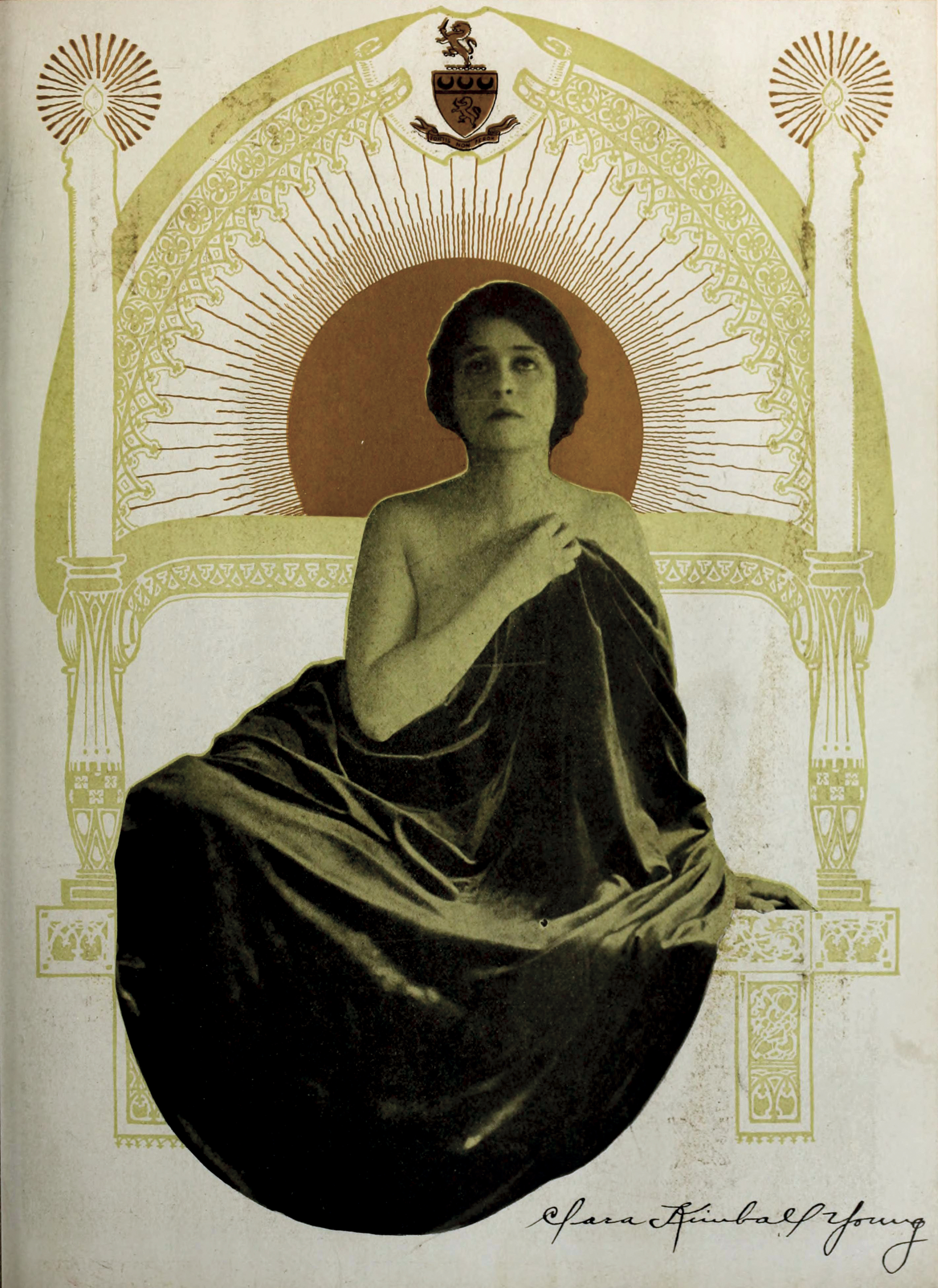
Advertisement, 1917

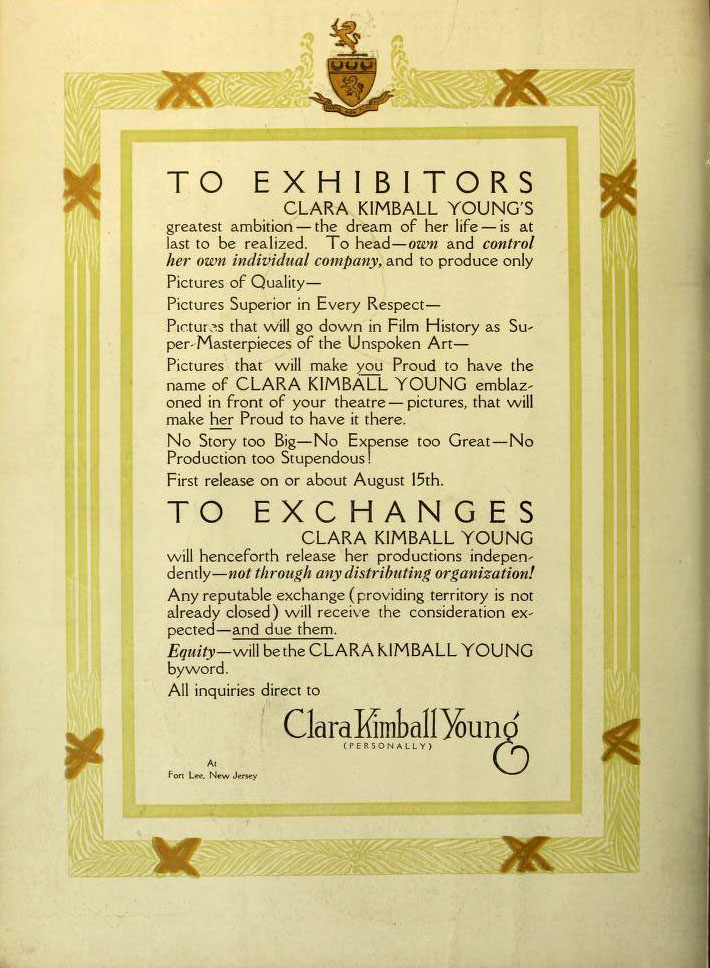
Advertisement, 1917

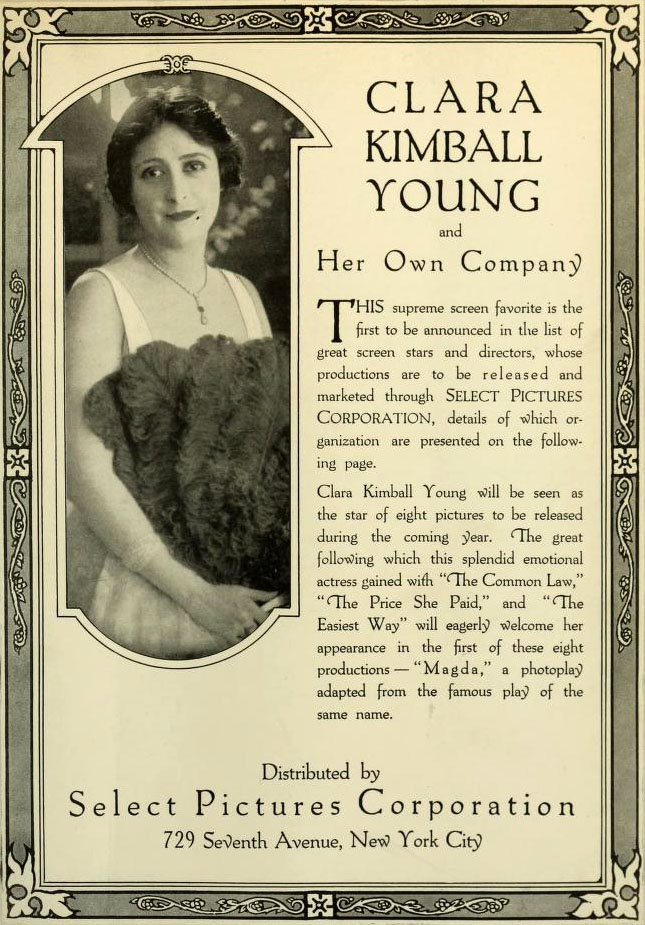
Advertisement, 1917

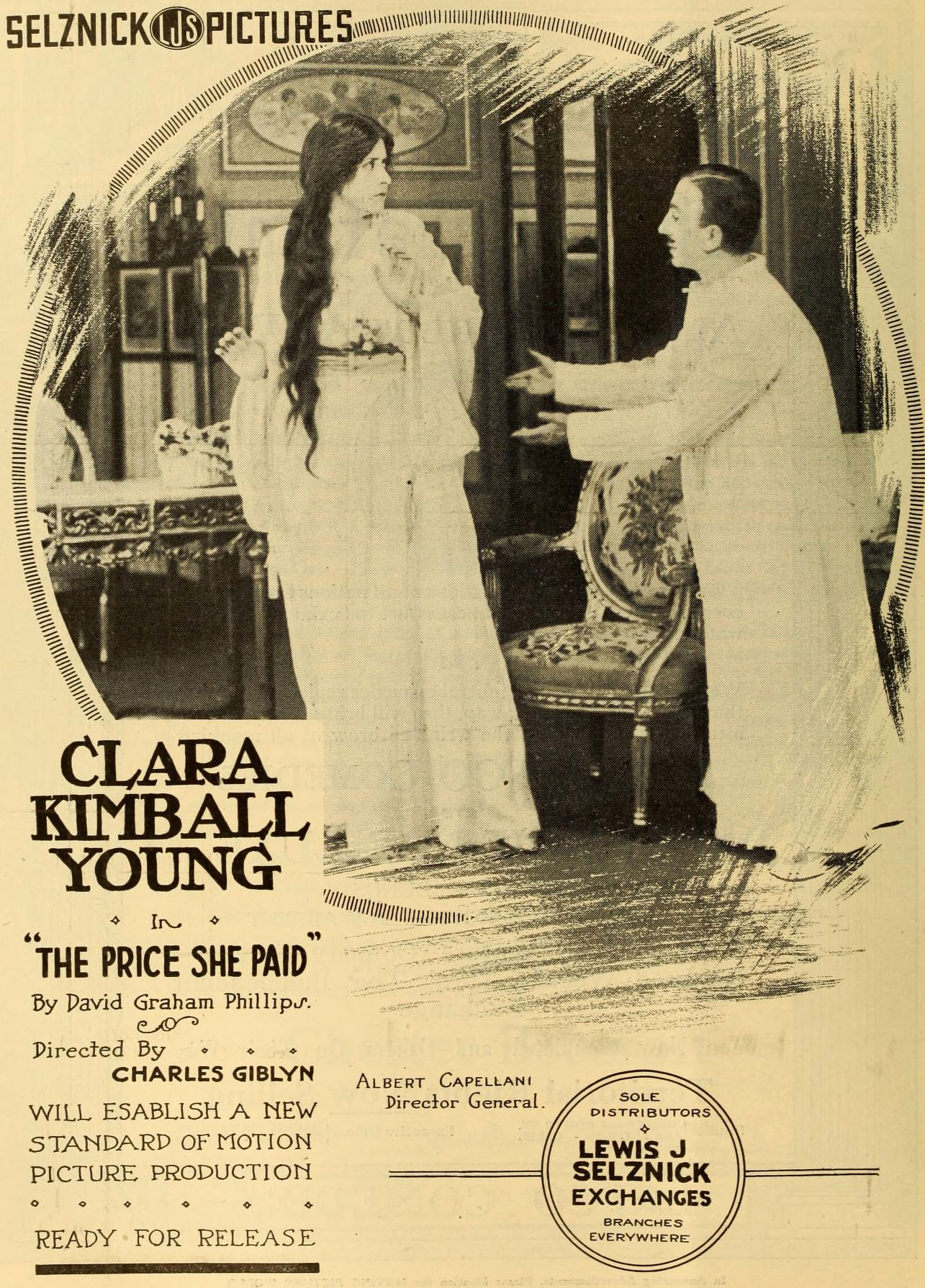
The Price She Paid, 1917

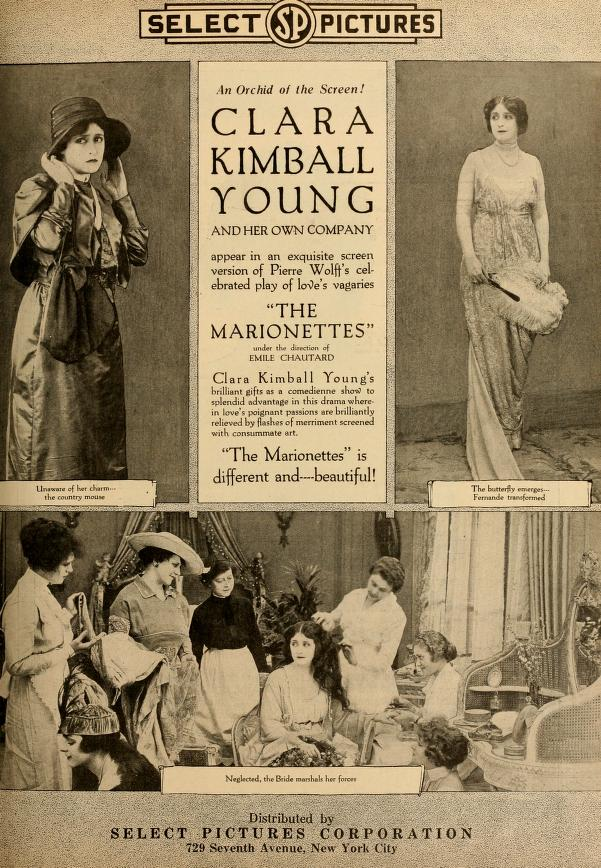
The Marionette, 1918

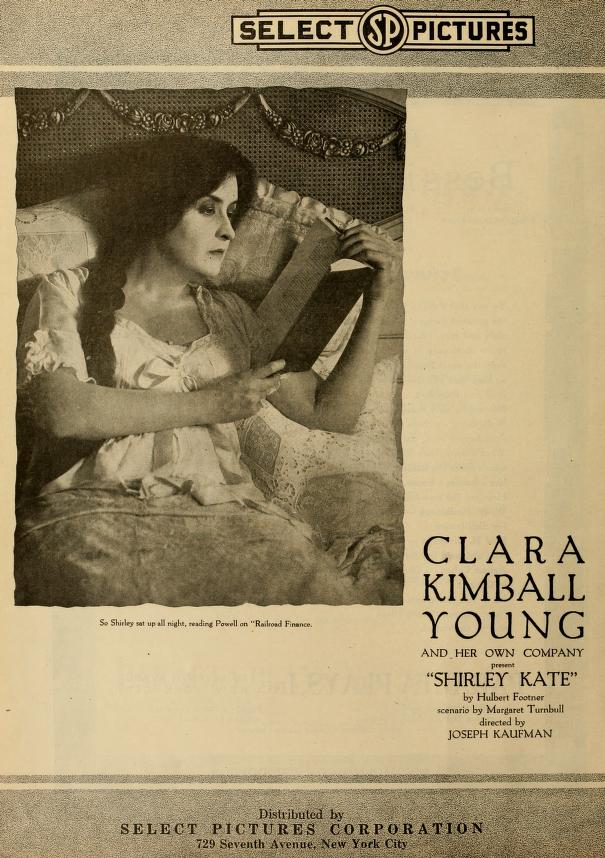
Shirley Kate, 1918
