= Harry Garson =

American film director (1882–1938)

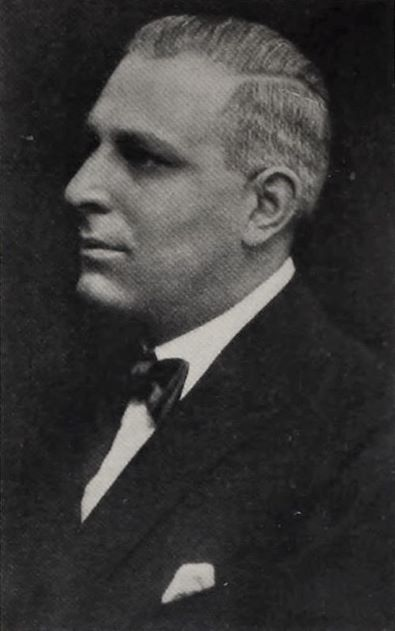
- From a 1926 magazine
- Born: 1882; Rochester, New York, U.S.
- Died: September 21, 1938 (aged 55–56); Los Angeles, California, U.S.
- Occupation: Film director
- Years active: 1920–1934
- Spouse: Clara Kimball Young (m. 1920; div. 1927)

Harry Garson (1882 – September 21, 1938) was an American film director. He directed 30 films between 1920 and 1934, and produced 11 films before that. He was born in Rochester, New York, and died in Los Angeles, California.

== Selected filmography ==
- The Unpardonable Sin (1919) co-producer
- The Forbidden Woman (1920)
- For the Soul of Rafael (1920)
- Mid-Channel (1920)
- Whispering Devils (1920)
- Hush (1921)
- Straight from Paris (1921)
- Charge It (1921)
- What No Man Knows (1921)
- The Worldly Madonna (1922)
- The Sign of the Rose (1922) director
- The Hands of Nara (1922) director
- Enter Madame (1922) producer
- The Woman of Bronze (1923) producer
- An Old Sweetheart of Mine (1923) director
- Thundering Dawn (1923) director
- The College Boob (1923) director
- The No-Gun Man (1924) director
- The Millionaire Cowboy (1924) director
- Breed of the Border (1924) director
- High and Handsome (1925)
- Smilin' at Trouble (1925)
- Heads Up (1925)
- Speed Wild (1925)
- Sir Lumberjack (1926)
- The Traffic Cop (1926) director
- Glenister of the Mounted (1926) director
- Mulhall's Greatest Catch (1926) director
- The College Boob (1926)
- The Beast of Borneo (1934) director
