= Aunt Jane's Nieces in the Red Cross =

1915 young adult novel written by L. Frank Baum

- First edition
- Author: L. Frank Baum (as "Edith Van Dyne")
- Illustrator: Norman P. Hall
- Language: English
- Series: Aunt Jane's Nieces
- Genre: Young adult fiction
- Publisher: Reilly & Britton
- Publication date: 1915; 1918
- Publication place: United States
- Media type: Print (Hardcover)
- Pages: 256 pp. (1915); 288 pp. (1918)
- Preceded by: Aunt Jane's Nieces Out West

Aunt Jane's Nieces in the Red Cross is a 1915 young adult novel written by L. Frank Baum, famous as the creator of the Land of Oz. It is the tenth and final volume in Baum's Aunt Jane's Nieces series of books for adolescent girls — the second greatest success of his publishing career, after the Oz books themselves. As with all the previous books in the series, Aunt Jane's Nieces in the Red Cross was released under the pen name "Edith Van Dyne," one of Baum's various pseudonyms.

The book is noteworthy in Baum's canon for its expression of his views and feelings on World War I.

== Foreword ==
The book was furnished with an introductory note by "Edith Van Dyne," an unusual though not unprecedented step for books in the series. (The second book, Aunt Jane's Nieces Abroad, also features an author's introduction.) In this introduction, Baum wrote,

"This is the story of how three brave American girls sacrificed the comforts and luxuries of home to go abroad and nurse the wounded soldiers of a foreign war.

"I wish I might have depicted more gently the scenes in hospital and on battlefield, but it is well that my girl readers should realize something of the horrors of war, that they may unite with heart and soul in earnest appeal for universal, lasting Peace and the future abolition of all deadly strife."

== Synopsis ==
The novel opens on 7 September 1914; the continuing characters Patsy Doyle, Beth De Graf, and their uncle John Merrick are reading a newspaper account of the end of the Siege of Maubeuge and the German victory. Both of the girls are intensely concerned with the war news; Beth in particular is a partisan of the French cause.

The protagonists are soon re-united with "Ajo" Jones and the movie star Maud Stanton, two characters from the previous book in the series, Aunt Jane's Nieces Out West. (Baum arrived at Maud Stanton's name by combining his wife's first name, Maud, with his mother's maiden name, Stanton.) Maud Stanton takes the place of the third of the trio of cousins, Louise Merrick, who does not appear in the final book.

Both Maud and Ajo have come to New York; Maud is one her way to Europe to serve as a nurse. (She trained in nursing before becoming a film actress.) Patsy and Beth are struck with admiration for her action, and are eager to follow her example. When Uncle John finds that he cannot dissuade them, he resolves to back their effort; he uses his wealth and influence to form a connection with the American Red Cross. Jones, also enthusiastic for the cause, volunteers his ocean-going yacht, the Arabella, for conversion to a hospital ship. Uncle John pays for its refitting and for two ambulances to carry the wounded.

Merrrick's money and the girls' enthusiasm work wonders; by the end of September the Arabella, painted with large red crosses, is in Dunkirk. Among their staff is a talented surgeon, Doctor Gys. He is "an eccentric, a character...erratic and whimsical," an adventurer who has been from the Arctic to the Yucatán, and in the process has been badly disfigured by various hard-luck accidents (involving icebergs and poisoned cacti). Gys calls himself a coward, but also sees death as a release from his disfigured body; he wonders what kind of death would be preferable, and has a morbid interest in confronting the violence of the War. The Americans also acquire a Belgian chauffeur named Maurie as an ambulance driver; he provides comic relief for the book, in somewhat the same way as the chauffeur Wampus does in Aunt Jane's Nieces and Uncle John.

The protagonists cope with military bureaucracies and confront the horrors of the battlefield — though Baum, "in keeping with his Van Dyne persona...kept his descriptions mild." Beth has previously had a year of nursing training; but Patsy is a neophyte who is shocked at the conditions she encounters. Doctor Gys reacts with paralyzing fear on his first exposure to combat, but his medical discipline soon takes over and he functions effectively.

In the climax of the story, Patsy is injured but recovers, but Dr. Gys is killed on the battlefield. Though Gys had repeatedly proclaimed his cowardice, his death is heroic.

The Americans lose the confidence of the French authorities at Dunkirk when a German prisoner they are treating escapes their custody; fewer wounded come to their ship as a result, and it appears that their usefulness is limited. After three months of service, the girls return to the United States. Uncle John tells them that "You have unselfishly devoted your lives for three strenuous months to the injured soldiers of a foreign war, and I hope you're satisfied that you've done your full duty."

== The 1918 revision ==
Baum's 1915 text of Aunt Jane's Nieces in the Red Cross reflected the neutral status of the United States at that date. The nieces and their hospital ship treat the wounded of both sides; "They encounter gentlemanly and admirable German officers, as well as bullies." They express the hope that the war will not last long, and they soon return home.

By 1918, though, the situation had changed dramatically; on the personal level, two of Baum's four sons were serving with the American army in Europe. Baum and his publisher decided to issue a revised edition of the book. For the 1918 revision, Baum wrote four new chapters that toughen the tone of the book and replace the neutral outlook with one that favors the Allies. Where the War had been viewed as waste and folly in the earlier version, it is now seen as a moral conflict between right and wrong; John Merrick asserts that his "money and energy must be expended in defeating the menace of the Central Powers." The horrors of the War are given a more direct treatment, particularly in the case of an American cameraman who is badly wounded and treated by the young nurses.

The ending of the story varies significantly between the two versions. In the 1918 text, the girls do not go home after three months, but plan to stay as long as they can be helpful. Dr. Gys survives, and his disfigurements are remedied by a skilled plastic surgeon. Once Gys is restored to his original good looks, he and Beth become engaged to be married. An engagement also looms for Patsy at the story's end.

== The illustrator ==
Eight of the nine prior books in the Aunt Jane's Nieces series had been illustrated by Emile A. Nelson; the Red Cross volume was the only one of the ten illustrated by Norman P. Hall. Hall had contributed one picture to Baum's 1901 story collection American Fairy Tales, and in the interim had done abundant work for Baum's publisher Reilly & Britton. Hall specialized in adventure stories, scouting handbooks, and comparable material; he illustrated titles like Homemade Toys for Girls and Boys, Carpentry and Mechanics for Boys, and Gordon Stuart's Boy Scouts of the Air series of juvenile novels.

== The end ==
In a letter dated 7 October 1915, Baum's publisher suggested to him that while the Aunt Jane's Nieces series had been "one of your — and our — bread-and-butter winners," it was time to bring the series to its end and start a new venture. Baum agreed, and began the Mary Louise series of books that would (along with his last Oz books) occupy him through the remainder of his literary career.

The Red Cross book was a natural point at which to stop the series. It is the most serious of the ten novels, with the most weighty subject matter; and it takes its protagonists out the world of their girlhoods and into adult life. Both the remaining single cousins, Patsy and Beth, are moving toward maturity and marriage at the end of the story.
