= Aunt Jane's Nieces =

1906 novel written by L. Frank Baum

- First edition cover design
- Author: L. Frank Baum (as "Edith Van Dyne")
- Illustrator: Emile A. Nelson
- Language: English
- Genre: Young adult fiction
- Publisher: Reilly & Britton
- Publication date: 1906
- Publication place: United States
- Media type: Print (hardcover)
- Pages: 325 pp.
- Followed by: Aunt Jane's Nieces Abroad

Aunt Jane's Nieces is the title of a juvenile novel published by Reilly & Britton in 1906, and written by L. Frank Baum under the pen name "Edith Van Dyne." Since the book was the first in a series of novels designed for adolescent girls, its title was applied to the entire series of ten books, published between 1906 and 1918.

== Inception ==
The book and the series were designed to appeal to the same audience as Louisa May Alcott's Little Women and Little Men. This was expressly stipulated in Baum's contract with Reilly & Britton, which stated:

Baum shall deliver to the Reilly and Britton Co. on or before March 1, 1906, the manuscript of a book for young girls on the style of the Louisa M. Alcott stories, but not so good, the authorship to be ascribed to "Ida May McFarland," or to "Ethel Lynne" or some other mythological female.

== Plot ==
Jane Merrick is a wealthy, elderly, difficult invalid woman who is preparing for her approaching death. In her youth, she inherited her money and estate from her fiancé, Thomas Bradley, who died before their wedding took place. With no children of her own, she calls for her three teenage nieces to visit her, so she can decide who will inherit her estate. They are Louise Merrick, Elizabeth De Graf, and Patsy Doyle, children of Jane's younger brother and sisters.

Louise, seventeen years old, was small when her father died after struggling and failing to succeed in business. Aunt Jane refused his request for financial assistance. He left only his life insurance money, and Louise and her mother lived cheaply on the proceeds for years. However, they developed a plan to improve their lot. They decided to spend the entire principle of their funds on a three-year spree of fancy living to gain Louise an entrance into society, with a goal of finding a suitable husband to support them.

Beth, fifteen, has two parents who can barely make ends meet, living under a tightly stretched budget. Aunt Jane refused a request for money from Beth's father just the previous year, and Beth cannot even trust him with her own money. Beth is a brooding small-town beauty, given to sullenness.

Sixteen-year-old Patsy manages and dotes on her Irish father after the death of her mother. Aunt Jane refused the only plea this sister ever made, for a loan to pay for medical care that might have saved her life. Patsy is a temperamental redhead who resents Aunt Jane's past neglect and determines to have nothing to do with the old woman's money.

The nieces visit Aunt Jane. (Patsy resists at first, but the willful Aunt Jane sends her lawyer to fetch the girl.) The three cousins display their contrasting traits: Louise, sweet but manipulative; Beth, her bluntness tinged with bitterness; and Patsy, forthright and gifted with a natural integrity. Patsy quickly takes herself out of the running for Aunt Jane's fortune, refusing to have any part of it. Yet the old woman takes a liking to the girl, precisely for her vigor, candor, and stubbornness.

Beth finds Aunt Jane distasteful, but makes friends with the servants. Louise insists on "nursing" Aunt Jane, and showers her with gushing affection that Jane finds insincere but hard to resist. Patsy, having declared she does not want the money, visits Aunt Jane's room when she wishes, with an independence which pleases the invalid considerably.

Living on the estate is Jane's dead fiancé's nephew, Kenneth Forbes, who was born long after Thomas Bradley died. As charged in the will, Jane has provided for him since his mother died eight years previously, but despises him, putting him in a room in a distant wing of the house, and never dining with him. The humiliated and neglected boy has become sullen, shy and awkward. Despite his lessons, he seems ignorant, but has nowhere else to go, as Jane will not pay for better education for him. Kenneth's only supporter is Jane's lawyer, Silas Watson, who sees glimmers of Kenneth's possibilities and tries to convince Jane to do him justice. Kenneth is beginning to show some abilities at drawing, but does not think anything of his skill.

Aunt Jane has several servants, but the most unusual is James, the gardener, who loves the flowers as much as she does. He was with Thomas Bradley when he died, which traumatized him so badly that he rarely speaks.

Aunt Jane is also visited in her final days by her long-lost older brother, the girls' Uncle John. He dresses shabbily, and is presumed to be down and out; his sister gives him a place to stay. Uncle John exhibits the honesty, kindness and good sense that are lacking in most of the family. He befriends everyone, including poor Kenneth, in whom he takes a genuine interest.

The nieces gradually learn to accommodate themselves to their contrasting personalities. An incident electrifies the family: Beth and Louise have routinely been teasing Kenneth, causing him to flee the house via a plank stretched from the rooftop to a tree. When Patsy comes to see him about a horse, he runs for his escape, but falls off the edge. In full view of her aunt, she heroically pulls him up and saves him, but loses her balance and falls to the ground, breaking a leg.

This accident brings the young people together, breaking down the barriers between them. Kenneth learns to socialize with the girls and overcome his shyness, and the nieces begin to enjoy each other's company. Kenneth receives a mysterious gift of drawing materials, and begins to show his work to the girls. However, Jane's health continues to deteriorate, and she decides to make a will leaving the bulk of the estate to Patsy. Patsy refuses, and insists Jane should leave the estate to Kenneth. After fighting over this for many days, Jane pretends to give in to Patsy, but secretly invalidates the new will.

A short while later Jane passes away in the garden, and poor gardener James is the unlucky one who finds her. He runs shrieking away, to hide in his room for days.

The inheritance drama comes to a head over not one last will and testament, but three. After the funeral, Silas Watson opens the envelope containing the last will, and discovers that Jane has torn off the signatures and voided it. Her previous will, leaving the estate to Patsy with token amounts to the others, comes into effect. Patsy pledges to give the estate to Kenneth when she comes of age, and to increase her cousin's cash portions.

The group is suddenly called to James' room, where he lies dying after being kicked by a horse. This has shocked him into his right mind for the first time since Thomas Bradley's death years ago. He tells them about the accident, and how he drew the grievously injured man from the wreck. He explains that "Master Tom" demanded paper to make out a new will. The conductor and James both signed it to make it legal. However, the dying James does not recognize the people around him, who look so old to his now-young brain, and refuses to give them the will. He dies, and Watson and Uncle John search the room and find it. In the hasty will, Thomas bequeathed to Jane the use of his estate during her lifetime, after which it should revert to his sister and her descendants. In other words, Jane had no ability to will anything to anyone, and Kenneth is the sole rightful heir.

When this is announced, the group is shocked. There are no cash bequests to anyone – the fortune is all Kenneth's. The girls decide to go home; since Uncle John seems homeless, Patsy invites him to move in with her and her father.

Back in New York, Uncle John is quietly bemused by their poor apartment and his bed on the sofa. When they leave for work, he slips into an uptown banker's office where he meets with important people who treat him deferentially. After a week, Patsy receives her first surprise from an unknown benefactor – keys to a lovely furnished apartment provided free for at least three years. When they nervously visit it, they discover it has been fitted out completely, and a maid rings the bell reporting for duty, all her wages prepaid.

While Patsy and her father retrieve their things from the old apartment, Uncle John makes a quick visit to Louise and her mother, who treat him coldly. He leaves, embarrassed, but in the distance Louise's banker neighbor points him out: "he's worth from eighty to ninety millions, at least, and controls most of the canning and tin-plate industries of America."

Patsy is concerned about the apartment, but Uncle John says, "There is nothing too good for a brave, honest girl who's [sic] heart is in the right place." Subsequently, Patsy reports for work and is told she's been fired. When she returns home, she finds a lady waiting to tutor her, to prepare her for women's college. That afternoon, to her delight, a piano teacher arrives. In the meantime, her father is informed that his firm's bankers would like to employ him, in a job that requires very few hours and pays a generous sum. Days later, he encounters Uncle John at the bank conducting his business, and learns the truth. At home, John points out that they all assumed he was poor, and he simply did not correct them. He promises to give the use of substantial money to both of the other girls' families, which can then be left to the nieces, so that they will not be in need.

Uncle John asks if he can continue to stay with Patsy and her father. She says, "I never meant to part with you, when I thought you poor, and I'll not desert you now that I know you're rich."

== Criticism ==
The novel was described as "genuinely original and interesting. It focuses on three adolescent girls, two of whom combine basic good character with ugly traits not usually found in fiction for young girls. Baum starts with a trite situation that could occasion prosy moralizing...and gives it several original twists."

== The series ==
The rest of the novels in the series feature travel, adventures, accidents, a kidnapping and rescue, romances, and a marriage for Louise. The final novel, Aunt Jane's Nieces in the Red Cross, was originally published in 1915, when the United States was still neutral in World War I; the nieces treat the wounded of both sides, and express the hope that the War will soon be over. The publisher issued a revised edition in 1918, with a darker treatment of the subject.

- Aunt Jane's Nieces, 1906
- Aunt Jane's Nieces Abroad, 1907
- Aunt Jane's Nieces at Millville, 1908
- Aunt Jane's Nieces at Work, 1909
- Aunt Jane's Nieces in Society, 1910
- Aunt Jane's Nieces and Uncle John, 1911
- Aunt Jane's Nieces on Vacation, 1912
- Aunt Jane's Nieces on the Ranch, 1913
- Aunt Jane's Nieces Out West, 1914
- Aunt Jane's Nieces in the Red Cross, 1915/1918

In the original editions, each book had a cover illustration and a frontispiece. The first eight volumes in the series were illustrated by Emile A. Nelson, and the ninth by James McCracken. The tenth was illustrated by Norman P. Hall, who had contributed one picture to Baum's 1901 collection American Fairy Tales.

(The Edith Van Dyne pseudonym was also used for other Baum works, the two Flying Girl books of 1911–12, and his Mary Louise stories of 1916–20.)

== Popular success ==
In their era, the Aunt Jane's Nieces books were as successful with their target audience as the Oz books were with younger children. In 1911 the six titles then in print sold 22,569 copies. Indeed, toward the end of Baum's life they outsold the Oz books. (The books were popular as grammar-school graduation gifts for girls.) After the 1920s the books were largely forgotten for the rest of the century, except for Baum enthusiasts and a small but growing coterie of Baum scholars. By the turn of the 21st century, however, the trend of re-evaluation and re-publication of Baum's works reached the series: nine of the ten books were reprinted between 2005 and 2007.
