= Aunt Jane's Nieces and Uncle John =

1911 novel written by L. Frank Baum

- First edition
- Author: L. Frank Baum (as "Edith Van Dyne")
- Illustrator: Emile A. Nelson
- Language: English
- Series: Aunt Jane's Nieces
- Genre: Young adult fiction Travel literature Melodrama
- Publisher: Reilly & Britton
- Publication date: 1911
- Publication place: United States
- Media type: Print (hardcover)
- Pages: 275 pp.
- Preceded by: Aunt Jane's Nieces in Society
- Followed by: Aunt Jane's Nieces on Vacation

Aunt Jane's Nieces and Uncle John is a young adult novel written by L. Frank Baum, famous as the creator of the Land of Oz. It is the sixth volume in the ten-book series Aunt Jane's Nieces, Baum's greatest commercial success after the Oz books themselves. Like the other books in the series, this sixth volume was issued under the pen name "Edith Van Dyne," one of Baum's multiple pseudonyms.

== Background ==
Unlike the Oz books and Baum's other fantasies, the Aunt Jane's Nieces stories were set in the contemporary world, and so could be enriched with the author's real-life experiences. Baum based much of the material in the sixth book on a trip that he and his wife took through the Southwestern United States in February and March 1904 — just as he had earlier relied on his 1906 trip to the Mediterranean and Egypt for his books Aunt Jane's Nieces Abroad (1907) and The Last Egyptian (1908).

Aunt Jane's Nieces and Uncle John bears some noteworthy resemblances to Baum's earlier novel Annabel (1906). Both books involve a rich man and a lost child suffering in poverty; both plots depend heavily on coincidence, and both end with a nod to divine providence.

== Synopsis ==
Aunt Jane's Nieces and Uncle John picks up the continuing story of the three cousins Patsy Doyle, Beth De Graf, and Louise Merrick, and their family; the plot of the book begins three days after the wedding of Louise and her fiancé Arthur Weldon, the event that concluded the fifth book in the series, Aunt Jane's Nieces in Society. The sixth novel begins, as per pattern, with the cousins' Uncle John getting an inspiration for a new adventure: in this case, the family will escape a cold New York City winter by taking a trip to Southern California, the land of "sunshine and roses." Since Louise is away on her honeymoon, she is effectively left out of the story; her place is taken by Major Doyle, Patsy's father – the first time that the Major accompanies the young people on their escapades. (The Major is relieved that Uncle John has set his fancy merely on California, and not "Timbuktu or Yucatan...Ethiopia or Hindustan....")

The four travelers (accompanied by Mumbles, Patsy's new puppy) reach Denver by train; along the way, they meet an appealing teenage girl (14 or 15 years old) named Myrtle Dean. Myrtle is a poor orphan; she was injured in an automobile accident, which inhibited her ability to walk. She had been living in Chicago with an aunt, and earned her living by sewing. But now, Myrtle has been sent West by her unsympathetic aunt to find a missing uncle named Anson Jones – though neither woman knows if the uncle is still in Leadville, Colorado, his last known address, or if he will be able to care for the girl if she finds him. Patsy and Beth are shocked at her situation; it is clear to them that the aunt has abandoned Myrtle to her own inadequate resources. Uncle John telegraphs ahead, and discovers that the mysterious uncle has left Leadville for parts unknown. Patsy and Beth then adopt Myrtle as their "protégé," and take her with them on their trip. They buy her new clothes, and she shares their hotels, meals, and adventures.

(Baum cannot resist the fairy-tale viewpoint, and "Edith Van Dyne" gives a plug for the Oz books: Myrtle is "amazed and awed by the splendor of her new apparel, and could scarcely believe her good fortune. It seemed like a fairy tale to her, and she imagined herself a Cinderella with two fairy godmothers who were young and pretty girls possessing the purse of Fortunatus and the generosity of Glinda the Good.")

Uncle John buys a large, seven-passenger touring car and outfits it for camping and cross-country travel. He also hires a chauffeur, a half-Indian Québécois named Wampus. The chauffeur provides some of the comic relief in the story, though he is also presented as highly competent, courageous, and principled, a "brave and true man." (Baum employs another comic chauffeur in the final book in the series, Aunt Jane's Nieces in the Red Cross.)

The party sets off by car from Albuquerque; they visit the Grand Canyon and the Navaho and Hopi reservations. They witness a performance of the Hopi snake dance. In western Arizona they are waylaid by a riotous group of cowboys, who refuse to let them pass until the girls join them in a dance. In what grows into an ugly incident, the travelers are forced to acquiesce – at first; but Patsy and Beth, typically clever and resourceful, develop a plan to defeat their opponents and escape.

The group reaches California, none the worse for wear; they are delighted with the change of scene. They make the Hotel del Coronado in San Diego their headquarters. (This is another bit of autobiographical writing for Baum; he stayed regularly at the Coronado during trips to California.) Myrtle Dean has proved a companion; her health has shown signs of improvement with better diet, less anxiety, and new friendships.

Myrtle, however, has been the center of a series of curious events. At the Grand Canyon, the travelers saw a morose-looking man standing at the very lip of the canyon; Myrtle, fearing that he intended to jump, cried out to him, and the man turned away from the edge. At San Diego, they once again see the strange man, standing on a cliff over the ocean; Myrtle once again fears his suicide, and cries out to him. The man turns out to be staying at the Coronado; his name in C. B. Jones. Myrtle happens upon him a third time, and takes away the revolver he has been brooding over in his room.

After the three incidents, the man becomes emotionally attached to, if not fixated upon, Myrtle. Uncle John's inquiries reveal that the man, Collanson Jones, is the "Anson" Jones who is Myrtle's missing uncle. The two are happy at this re-unification of their sundered family, and Jones's deep melancholy is relieved (the evil aunt who sent Myrtle away had told him the girl was dead). And since Jones has made his fortune in mining, Myrtle's financial future is secured.

== Racial insensitivity ==
As with some of his other books, elements in Baum's Aunt Jane's Nieces and Uncle John violate modern standards of racial sensitivity and political correctness. Baum's view of the Indians of the Southwest is not pleasant; the Navaho are criticized for their "filth and laziness...." The Hopi (Baum calls them the "Moki") are presented somewhat more positively; their leaders speak "excellent English" and their snake dance is "unique" and "picturesque," though the girls find it "nauseating and offensive...."

The interlude at the reservations concludes with the chauffeur Wampus catching an Indian thief and sitting on him until his employers return to their car. As Baum puts it, "The chauffeur, partly an Indian himself, knew well how to manage his captive and quieted the fellow by squeezing his throat with his broad stubby fingers." Wampus threatens to torture and kill the "big Indian," and when Uncle John decides to let the man go Wampus tells him of the "mercy of Great White Chief."

For more perspective on the issue of bias versus tolerance in Baum's works, see: Daughters of Destiny, Sam Steele's Adventures on Land and Sea, and Sky Island.

== The villains ==
The main villains in the book are the malicious cowboys who intercept the travelers in western Arizona. Their identity is surprising: they are not Americans but Englishmen, a crew of "remittance men." They are offspring of the English gentry and aristocracy, who are paid by their families to live away from home, either for their crimes and sins or simply because they are inconvenient younger sons in the system of primogeniture. One, for instance, has killed a rival in a duel. Uncle John calls them "mollycoddles and social drones...." The leader of the group is Algernon Tobey, "the fourth son of old Lord Featherbone," who "got into a disgraceful mess in London some years ago." The travelers confront the remittance men about their dissolute and disorderly way of life. Patsy argues with one man named Tim, telling him that he should forget about his meagre allowance, leave his barren ranch, and head for the growing cities of the West to build a new life through honest work. Tim, however, rejects this advice; ambition bores him, and he is content with what little pleasure he can squeeze out of his situation. Patsy gives up on Tim; "His world was not their world."

(Perhaps coincidentally, Robert W. Service published his poem "The Rhyme of the Remittance Man" in his 1907 collection The Spell of the Yukon. Mark Twain also wrote about a remittance man in his 1897 book Following the Equator.)
