= Bertram Grassby =

English actor (1880–1953)

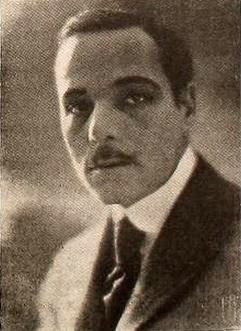
- Grassby in Motion Picture News, 1920
- Born: 23 December 1880; Lincolnshire, England
- Died: 7 December 1953 (aged 72); Scottsdale, Arizona, USA
- Occupation: Actor
- Years active: 1914–1927
- Spouse: Gerard Alexander

Bertram Grassby (23 December 1880 – 7 December 1953) was an English actor. He appeared in more than 90 silent era films between 1914 and 1927. Grassby was married to American actress Gerard Alexander. He was born in Lincolnshire, England and died in Scottsdale, Arizona.

== Selected filmography ==
- His Father's Rifle (1914) - Higgens
- Liberty (1916) - Manuel Leon
- Langdon's Legacy (1916) - Juan Maria Barada
- It Happened in Honolulu (1916) - Lord Percy
- The Mysterious Mrs. M (1917) - Clubman
- To Honor and Obey (1917) = Richard Hallam
- Even As You and I (1917) - Artist
- Rasputin, the Black Monk (1917) - Alexus
- The Soul of Satan (1917) - Joe Valdez
- Cheating the Public (1918) - Chester Dowling
- The Moral Law (1918) - Donn Pedro
- Salomé (1918) - Prince David
- The Hope Chest (1918) - Stoughton Lounsbury
- A Romance of Happy Valley (1919) - Judas
- The Delicious Little Devil (1919) - Duke de Sauterne
- Fools and Their Money (1919) - Cholly Van Dusen
- The Gray Horizon (1919) - John Furthman
- The Lone Wolf's Daughter (1919) - Michael Lanyard, the Lone Wolf
- What Every Woman Wants (1919) - Marston Hughes
- Yvonne from Paris (1919) - Harley Pembroke
- The Woman and the Puppet (1920) - Philippe
- The Week-End (1920) - Spencer Jardine
- For the Soul of Rafael (1920) - Rafael Artega
- Mid-Channel (1920) - Leonard Ferris
- Hush (1921) - Herbert Brooks
- Hold Your Horses (1921) - Rodman Cadbury
- Straight from Paris (1921) - Robert Van Austen
- A Parisian Scandal (1921) - Baron Stransky
- Fifty Candles (1921) - Hung Chin Chung
- For the Defense (1922) - Dr. Joseph Kasimir
- Shattered Dreams (1922) - Théophine Grusant
- The Prisoner (1923) - Prince Ugo Ravorelli
- The Man from Brodney's (1923) - Rasula
- Pioneer Trails (1923) - Philip Blaney
- The Dancer of the Nile (1923) - Prince Tut
- His Hour (1924) - Boris Varishkine
- The Shadow of the Desert (1924) - Kunwar Singh
- One Law for the Woman (1924) - Bartlett
- The Heart Bandit (1924) - Ramón Orestest Córdova
- Fools in the Dark (1924) - Kotah - Dr. Rand's Servant
- She Wolves (1925) - André Delandal
- Havoc (1925) - Alexi Betskoy
- The Girl on the Stairs (1925) - José Sarmento
- Made for Love (1926) - Mahmoud Bey
- The Taxi Mystery (1926) - Fred Norris
- The Beautiful Cheat (1926) - Marquis de la Pontenac
- When a Man Loves (1927) - Le Duc de Richelieu
