= Shon the Piper =

1913 film

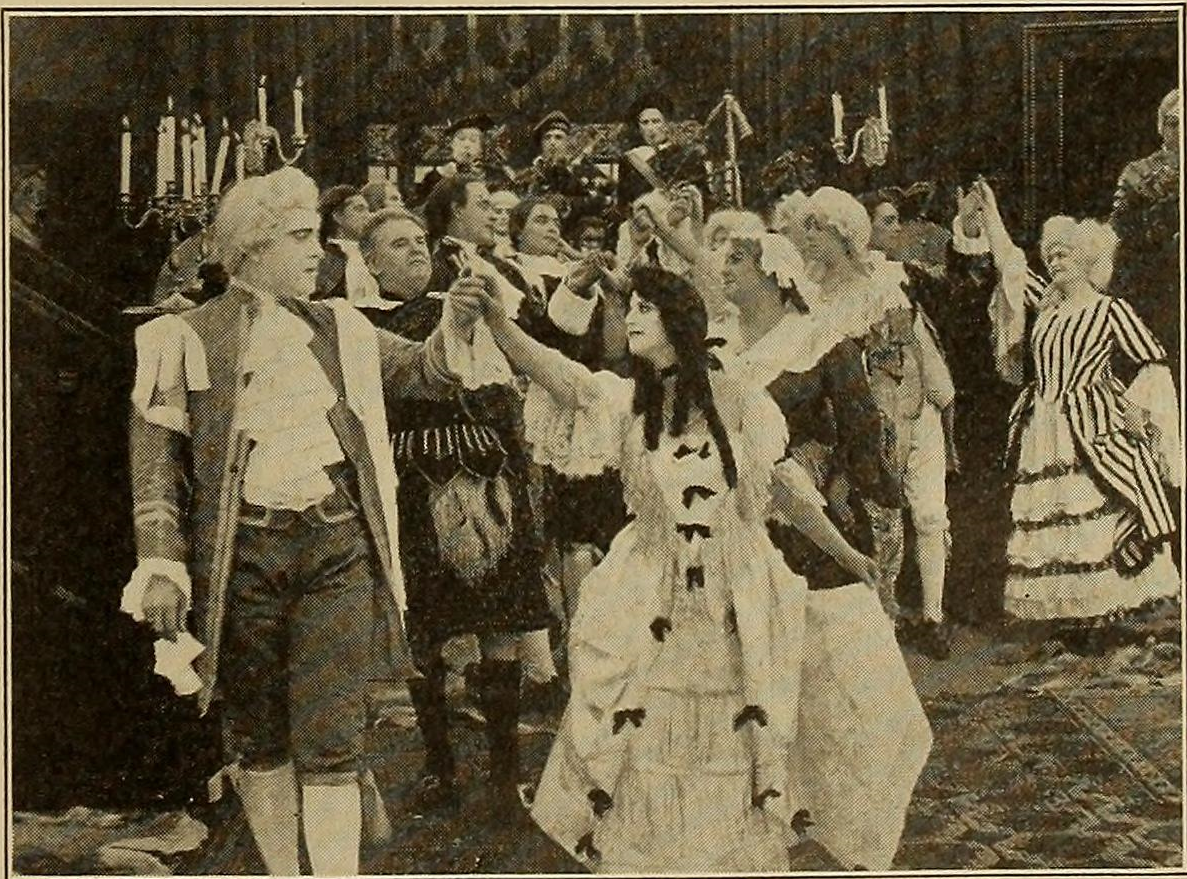
- A film still that shows Shon the Piper's cast
- Directed by: Otis Turner
- Produced by: Otis Turner
- Starring: Robert Z. Leonard; Joseph Singleton; Margarita Fischer; Lon Chaney
- Distributed by: Universal Film Manufacturing Company
- Release date: September 30, 1913
- Running time: 3 reels
- Country: United States
- Language: Silent (English intertitles)

Shon the Piper is a 1913 American silent short historical romantic drama film directed by Otis Turner, starring Robert Z. Leonard and Lon Chaney. The film follows a Scottish Duke who disguises himself as a piper and falls in love with a woman by the name of Madge. The woman's father refuses to let the two marry because he wants his daughter to marry the Laird of the Isla. At the wedding, Shon steals Madge away and a battle ensues between the clans.

The film was produced by the 101 Bison Film Company and released on September 30, 1913. The film saw a widespread national release and garnered some positive attention. Some sources have disputed the fact that Lon Chaney appeared in this film, but the Blake book states Chaney played a member of a Scottish clan (uncredited). The film is presumed lost.

== Plot ==
The synopsis of the film was provided in Moving Picture News as: "The action is laid in the latter part of the eighteenth century while the story revolves about a young Scotch duke who, determined not to marry one seeking his money, searches for adventure in the Highlands, disguised as a piper. He meets, during his wanderings, Madge, the daughter of Donald Maclvor. They fall in love at first sight. Unaware of Shon's real identity, the old father refuses to sanction the match. He prefers to give his daughter to the wealthy Laird of the Isla. When the girl carries this news to her lover he tells her to "Be of good cheer, my bonny lass; I'll pipe them a tune of another class." The wedding day is fixed and the Laird leads his melancholy fiancée forth. Shon visits the feast in the garb of a harpist. He amuses the guests for a while and then, throwing off his disguise, escapes with Madge from a window. But previous to this, Shon has called his clan together and when speeding away to his mansion, they cover his retreat. What follows is a remarkably thrilling and fresh piece of business; a battle between two kilted Scotch clans. And then the title of the youth is discovered and all ends well."

== Cast ==
- Robert Z. Leonard as Shon the Piper
- Margarita Fischer as Madge of the Hills
- Joseph Singleton as The Laird of the Isla
- Joseph Fischer
- John Burton as Tam MacIvor
- Lon Chaney as a member of the Scottish clans (disputed)

== Production ==
The film was produced by the 101 Bison Film Company. On August 23, 1910, the New York Clipper announced that J. W. Kerrigan had joined Universal Studios and would star in a new series of films directed by Allan Dwan. The first film listed was titled "A Restless Spirit" (The Restless Spirit) and the second film would be Shon the Piper. It is unknown if there was some change in Shon the Piper's production or if the Clipper was mistaken because neither Kerrigan nor Dwan are credited. Instead, Otis Turner would direct the film and the film would star Robert Z. Leonard and Margarita Fischer.

Prior to his motion picture debut, Leonard previously had a noted stage career in the California Opera Company in a variety of roles and sung in over a hundred light operas. Joseph Singleton played The Laird of the Isla and would be credited through an answer column in The Photo-play Journal. The cast of the film was not billed or credited in the production. Michael Blake credits Lon Chaney in a role in this film in his book, The Films of Lon Chaney. Jon C. Mirsalis states that he cannot confirm or deny an appearance by Lon Chaney, but notes that the only surviving film still does not show Lon Chaney among the cast members. Also, although most sources list the film as a three-reeler, a review exists from "Motion Picture World" that calls it "A remarkably fresh and interesting two-reel subject..."

== Release and reception ==
The three reel film was released on September 30, 1913. The Leavenworth Times gave a review prior to its release, stating "This is one of those bright sunny pictures that cannot fail to please everybody. The action is laid in the latter part of the eighteenth century and Margaret Fischer as the daughter of the rich Laird of the Isla takes part in some of the most enchanting pictures ever shown on a screen." The Huntington Herald said the film was a "remarkably fresh and interesting subject" and it described the film as a Scottish ballad.

The film had viewings in Kansas, Indiana, Texas, Chicago, Illinois, Missouri, Lincoln, Nebraska, North Carolina, Pennsylvania, and Wisconsin. Other showings include the "Indian Territory" of Oklahoma, Seattle, Washington, Arizona, Vermont, Oregon, and Utah. One of the last advertisements for the film was on December 19, 1913 announcing a showing at the Airdome in Durham, North Carolina.

The film is now considered lost. It is unknown when the film was lost, but if it was in Universal's vaults, it would have been deliberately destroyed along with the remaining copies of Universal's silent era films in 1948.
