= Aunt Jane's Nieces in Society =

1910 novel written by L. Frank Baum

- First edition
- Author: L. Frank Baum (as "Edith Van Dyne")
- Illustrator: Emile A. Nelson
- Language: English
- Genre: Young adult fiction Crime fiction Satire
- Publisher: Reilly & Britton
- Publication date: 1910
- Publication place: United States
- Media type: Print (hardcover)
- Pages: 264 pp.
- Preceded by: Aunt Jane's Nieces at Work
- Followed by: Aunt Jane's Nieces and Uncle John

Aunt Jane's Nieces in Society is a young adult novel written by L. Frank Baum, famous as the creator of the Land of Oz. First published in 1910, the book is the fifth volume in the Aunt Jane's Nieces series, which was the second-greatest success of Baum's literary career, after the Oz books themselves.

The novel carries forward the continuing story of the three cousins, Louise Merrick, Beth De Graf, and Patsy Doyle, and their relatives and friends. Like the other books in the series, it was released under the pen name "Edith Van Dyne," one of Baum's multiple pseudonyms.

== Theme ==
The book "develops a favorite theme of Baum's, the emptiness and artificiality of fashionable life." Throughout Baum's literary canon, but most notably in the Oz books and the Aunt Jane's Nieces series, Baum stresses the fundamental values of simplicity and naturalness as opposed to "sophistication."

Characters in the book express pronounced skepticism about the pretensions of high society. Patsy argues that "all decent folks" are members of society – and when another character calls this "communism," Patsy agrees, "Perhaps so." She continues,

...certain classes have leagued together and excluded themselves from their fellows, admitting only those of their own ilk. The people didn't put them on their pedestals – they put themselves there. Yet the people bow down and worship these social gods and seem glad to have them.

Beth's initial attitude is so negative that her cousin Louise calls her a "rank socialist."

== Synopsis ==
The story begins with a scene between the cousins' patron, Uncle John, and his sister-in-law, Louise's mother. Mrs. Merrick insists that the girls are suffering a disadvantage in not being active in "Fashionable Society." Though Uncle John knows that his sister-in-law is a vain and foolish woman, her criticism hits him in his most vulnerable spot; he cannot stand to think that his beloved nieces are lacking any of the good things in life. Uncle John capitalizes on a business contact with Hedrik Von Taer, a fixture of the Four Hundred, the social elite of New York City. The broker asks his daughter Diana Von Taer to sponsor the nieces' debut; Diana, well aware of John Merrick's millions and his importance to her father's business, agrees, as long as the girls are not "impossible."

Diana calls on the cousins individually; she is struck with Louise's sweetness and classic femininity, Patsy's liveliness, and Beth's beauty (though Diana and Beth dislike each other cordially on first acquaintance), and finds them at least marginally acceptable. Diana sponsors their debut, and all goes well; the cousins are accepted into the social whirl, and are soon managing the flower booth at the year's biggest charity ball.

Complications arise with the appearance of Arthur Weldon, the on-again off-again suitor of Louise from previous books. Arthur has been keeping company with Diana Von Taer, but once he sees Louise again his passion for her re-awakens – which arouses Diana's jealousy. Diana solicits her cousin Charles Connoldy Mershone, a ne'er-do-well and social black sheep, to pay court to Louise as a way to disrupt her romance with Arthur.

Diana doesn't anticipate that Mershone will actually fall in love with Louise – but he does. When Louise rejects him for the virtuous Arthur, Mershone goes to the extreme of abducting the young woman and keeping her at Diana's country house (in East Orange, New Jersey, then a rural backwater). Louise's absence impels her family and Arthur to call in the police and hire private detectives – one in particular, Quintus Fogerty, "the best man in all New York." Mershone is the obvious suspect in Louise's disappearance, but he is too crafty to reveal the missing girl's location. The affair allows the novel to take a look at a harsher and uglier side of contemporaneous social world.

Louise is initially shocked and disoriented by her abduction; but after five days she recovers enough to stage an escape. During an "old fashioned snowstorm" she climbs out a window and down a trellis. She is eventually overcome by the storm, but is rescued by a passing farm couple. Arthur Weldon discovers Louise at the farmer's house, where they are joyfully re-united.

Louise's family decides not to prosecute the repentant Mershone, to avoid a newspaper scandal and to eschew the "doubtful satisfaction" of revenge. The story concludes with the very fashionable wedding of Arthur Weldon and Louise Merrick. In the end, even Beth has modified her attitudes toward the social world:

"Society," announced Beth, complacently, "is an excellent thing in the abstract. It has its black sheep, of course; but I think no more than any other established class of humanity."

"Dear me!" cried Uncle John; "you once denounced society."

"That," said she, "was before I knew anything at all about it."

== The detective ==
Baum introduces the character of the private detective Quintus Fogerty in this book; the character re-appears in a later volume of the series, Aunt Jane's Nieces on Vacation. Fogerty serves the "purpose of extricating the girls when necessary" from plot difficulties. Critic Fred Erisman has judged Baum's use of this "real world" character as a tacit admission that the genial milieu of his gentler characters, the cousins and their family, cannot accommodate the darker elements of American society.
