= Clarence Brown =

American film director (1890–1987)

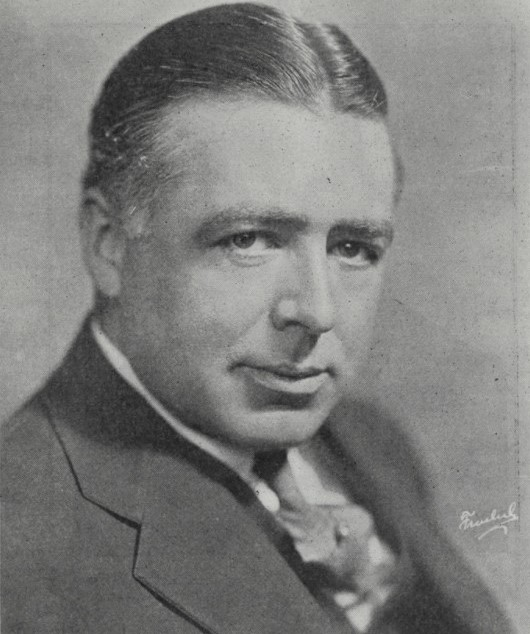
- Brown in 1922
- Born: Clarence Leon Brown; May 10, 1890; Clinton, Massachusetts, U.S.
- Died: August 17, 1987 (aged 97); Santa Monica, California, U.S.
- Education: University of Tennessee
- Years active: 1915–1953
- Spouses: Paula Herndon Pratt (m. 1913; div. 1920) Ona Wilson (m. 1922; div. 1927) Alice Joyce (m. 1933; div. 1945) Marian Spies (m. 1946)
- Children: 1

Clarence Leon Brown (May 10, 1890 – August 17, 1987) was an American film director.

== Early life ==
Born in Clinton, Massachusetts, to Larkin Harry Brown, a cotton manufacturer, and Katherine Ann Brown (née Gaw), Brown moved to Tennessee when he was 11 years old. He attended Knoxville High School and the University of Tennessee, both in Knoxville, Tennessee, graduating from the university at the age of 19 with two degrees in engineering. An early fascination in automobiles led Brown to a job with the Stevens-Duryea Company, then to his own Brown Motor Car Company in Alabama. He later abandoned the car dealership after developing an interest in motion pictures around 1913. He was hired by the Peerless Studio at Fort Lee, New Jersey, and became an assistant to the French-born director Maurice Tourneur.

== Career ==
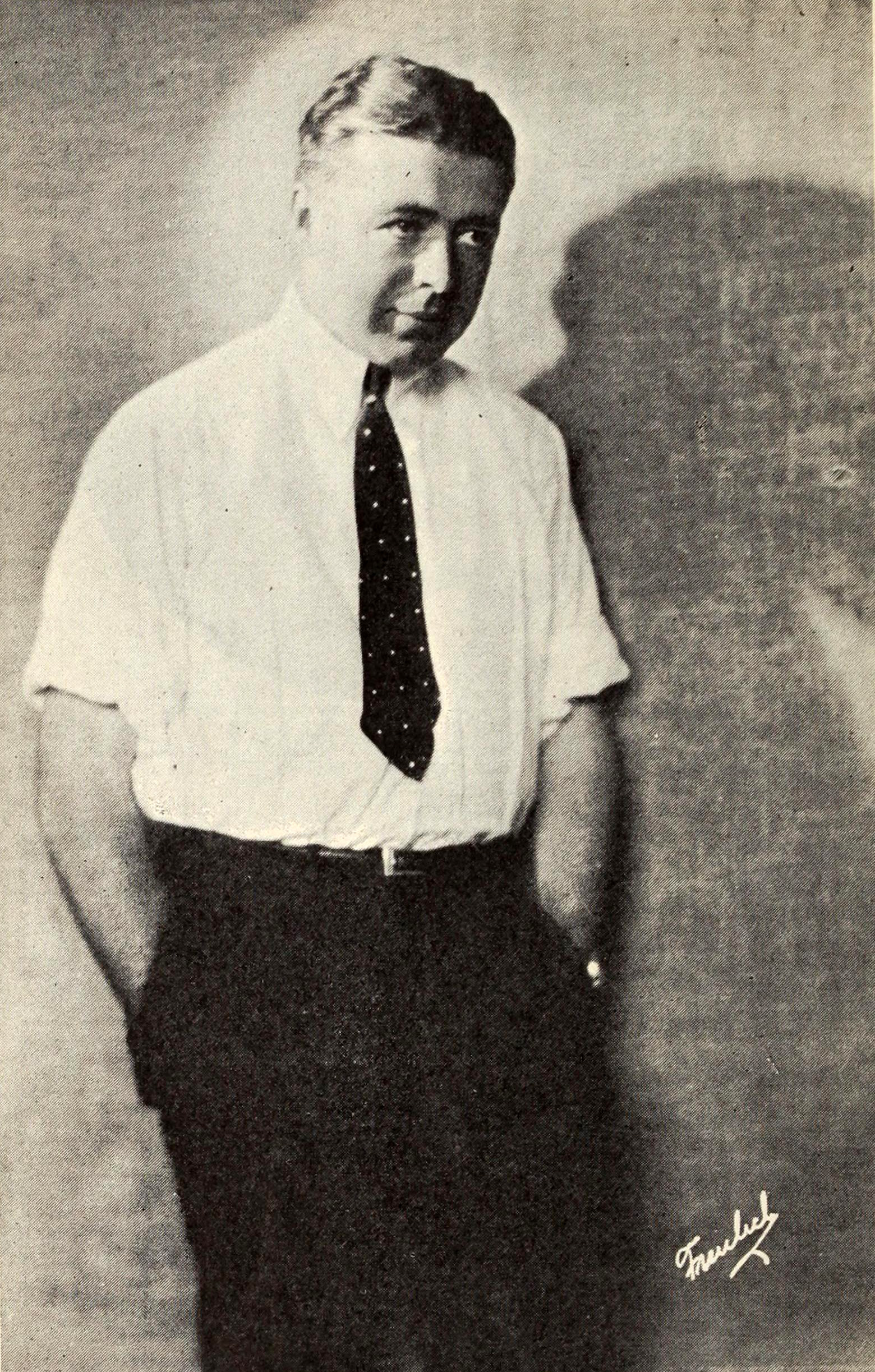
Clarence Brown in 1921

After serving as a fighter pilot and flight instructor in the United States Army Air Service during World War I, Brown was given his first co-directing credit (with Tourneur) for The Great Redeemer (1920). Later that year, he directed a major portion of The Last of the Mohicans after Tourneur was injured in a fall.

Brown moved to Universal in 1924, and then to Metro-Goldwyn-Mayer, where he remained until the mid-1950s. At MGM he was one of the main directors of their major female stars; he directed Joan Crawford six times and Greta Garbo seven.

Brown's films gained a total of 38 Academy Award nominations and earned nine Oscars. Though he never won a directing Oscar, Brown received five Academy Award nominations for six films, and in 1949, he won the British Academy Award for the film version of William Faulkner's Intruder in the Dust. At the 1935 Venice International Film Festival, he won Best Foreign Film for Anna Karenina, starring Garbo.

In 1957, Brown was awarded The George Eastman Award, given by George Eastman House for distinguished contribution to the art of film. Brown retired a wealthy man due to his real estate investments, but refused to watch new movies. He feared they might cause him to restart his career.

The Clarence Brown Theater, on the campus of the University of Tennessee, is named in his honor. He holds the record for most nominations for the Academy Award for Best Director without a win, with six.

== Personal life ==
Clarence Brown was married four times. His first marriage was to Paula Herndon Pratt in 1913, which lasted until their divorce in 1920. The couple produced a daughter, Adrienne Brown.

His second marriage was to Ona Wilson, which lasted from 1922 until their divorce in 1927.

He was engaged to Dorothy Sebastian and Mona Maris, although he did not marry either of them, with Maris later saying she ended their relationship because she had her "own ideas of marriage then."

He married his third wife, Alice Joyce, in 1933 and they divorced in 1945.

His last marriage was to Marian Spies in 1946, which lasted until his death in 1987.

== Death ==
Brown died at the Saint John's Health Center in Santa Monica, California from kidney failure on August 17, 1987, at the age of 97. He is interred at Forest Lawn Memorial Park in Glendale, California.

On February 8, 1960, Brown received a star on the Hollywood Walk of Fame at 1752 Vine Street, for his contributions to the motion pictures industry.

== Selected filmography ==
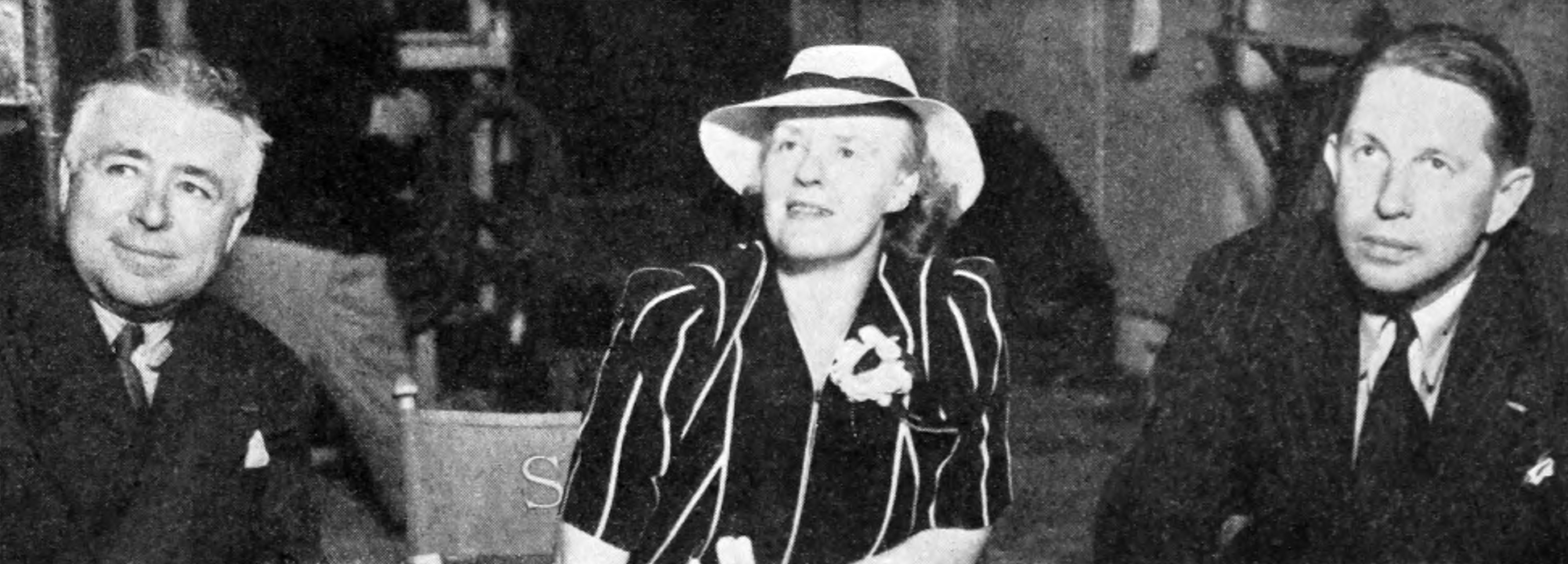
Journalist Dorothy Thompson is entertained on the set of The Rains Came (1939) by director Clarence Brown (left) and Louis Bromfield, author of the novel on which the film was based.

=== Director ===
- The Law of the Land (1917)
- The Great Redeemer (1920)
- The Last of the Mohicans (1920)
- The Foolish Matrons (1921)
- The Light in the Dark (1922)
- Don't Marry for Money (1923)
- The Acquittal (1923)
- The Signal Tower (1924)
- Butterfly (1924)
- The Eagle (1925)
- The Goose Woman (1925)
- Smouldering Fires (1925)
- Flesh and the Devil (1926)
- Kiki (1926)
- A Woman of Affairs (1928)
- The Trail of '98 (1929)
- Navy Blues (1929)
- Wonder of Women (1929)
- Anna Christie (1930) – Academy Award nomination for Best Director (Note: In 1929/1930, Brown received one Academy Award nomination for two films. According to the Academy of Motion Picture Arts and Sciences, "As allowed by the award rules for this year, a single nomination could honor work in one or more films.")
- Romance (1930) – Academy Award nomination for Best Director (Note: In 1929/1930, Brown received one Academy Award nomination for two films. According to the Academy of Motion Picture Arts and Sciences, "As allowed by the award rules for this year, a single nomination could honor work in one or more films.")
- Inspiration (1931)
- Possessed (1931)
- A Free Soul (1931) – Academy Award nomination for Best Director
- Emma (1932)
- Letty Lynton (1932)
- The Son-Daughter (1932)
- Looking forward (1933)
- Night Flight (1933)
- Sadie McKee (1934)
- Chained (1934)
- Anna Karenina (1935)
- Ah, Wilderness! (1935)
- Wife vs. Secretary (1936)
- The Gorgeous Hussy (1936)
- Conquest (1937)
- Of Human Hearts (1938)
- Idiot's Delight (1939)
- The Rains Came (1939)
- Edison, the Man (1940)
- Come Live with Me (1941)
- They Met in Bombay (1941)
- The Human Comedy (1943) – Academy Award nominations for Best Director and for Best Picture
- The White Cliffs of Dover (1944)
- National Velvet (1944) – Academy Award nomination for Best Director
- The Yearling (1946) – Academy Award nomination for Best Director
- Song of Love (1947)
- Intruder in the Dust (1949)
- To Please a Lady (1950)
- Angels in the Outfield (1951)
- When in Rome (1952)
- Plymouth Adventure (1952)

=== Actor ===
- The Signal Tower (1924) – Switch Man
- Ben-Hur (1925) – Chariot Race Spectator (uncredited)
- Navy Blues (1929) – Roller Coaster Rider (uncredited)
- Possessed (1931) – Man on Merry-Go-Round (uncredited) (final film role)

== Bibliography ==
- Brownlow, Kevin. "Clarence Brown" in The Parade's Gone By New York: Knopf (1968)
- Estrin, Allen. "The Hollywood Professionals, Vol. 6: Frank Capra, George Cukor, Clarence Brown", AS Barnes (1980)
- Bastarache, A.J. An Extraordinary Town, How one of America's smallest towns shaped the world – A Historical Marketing Book by A. J. Bastarache.
- Young, Gwenda. 'Clarence Brown: From Knoxville to Hollywood and Back'. Journal of East Tennessee History', pp. 53–73 (2002)
- Young, Gwenda (April 2003). "Star Maker: The Career of Clarence Brown". Sight and Sound. British Film Institute. Archived from the original on May 14, 2007.
- Young, Gwenda. Clarence Brown: Hollywood's Forgotten Master. Lexington: University Press of Kentucky, 2018
- Neely, Jack. "Clarence Brown: The Forgotten Director", Metro Pulse (March 2008)
