= The Opened Shutters =

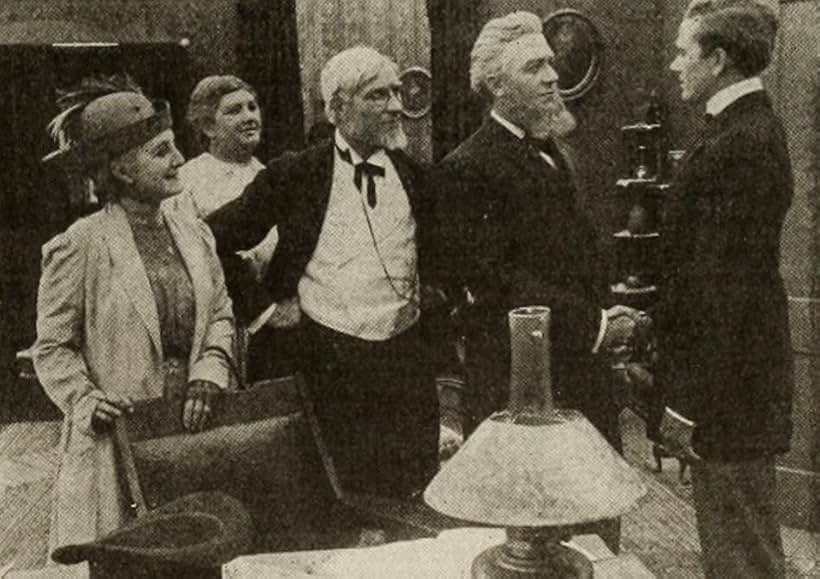
- Directed by: Otis Turner
- Written by: Lois Weber
- Based on: The Opened Shutters by Clara Louise Burnham
- Produced by: Carl Laemmle
- Starring: William Worthington; Frank Lloyd; Herbert Rawlinson
- Production company: Universal Pictures
- Distributed by: Universal Pictures
- Release date: November 17, 1914
- Running time: Four reels
- Country: United States
- Languages: Silent; English intertitles

The Opened Shutters is a 1914 American silent drama film directed by Otis Turner and starring William Worthington, Frank Lloyd and Herbert Rawlinson. It is based on a novel by Clara Louise Burnham. It was remade as Opened Shutters in 1921, directed by William Worthington who had starred in this film.

== Cast ==
- William Worthington as Thinkright Johnson
- Frank Lloyd as Judge Calvin Trent
- Herbert Rawlinson as John Dunham
- Ann Little as Sylvia Lacey
- Betty Schade as Edna Derwent
- Cora Drew as Miss Martha Lacey

== Bibliography ==
- Langman, Larry. American Film Cycles: The Silent Era. Greenwood Publishing, 1998.
