= The Great Redeemer =

1920 film by Maurice Tourneur and Clarence Brown

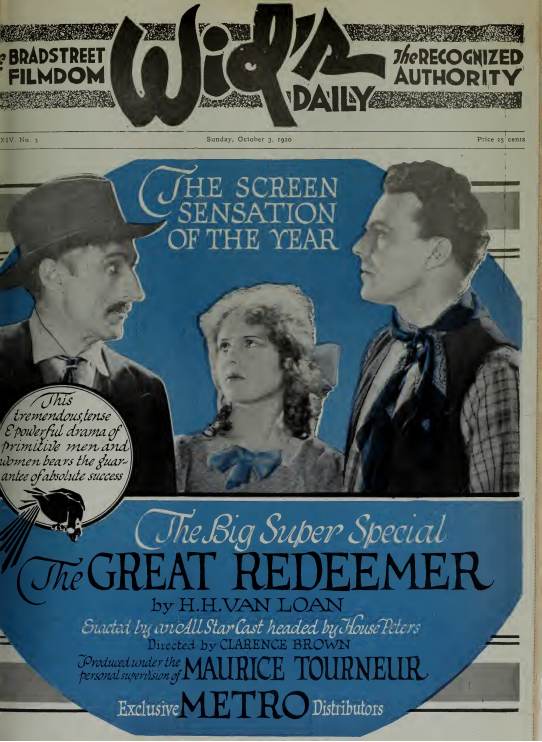
- Advertisement
- Directed by: Clarence Brown; Maurice Tourneur
- Written by: Jules Furthman; John Gilbert
- Starring: House Peters; Marjorie Daw; Jack McDonald; Joseph Singleton
- Cinematography: Charles Van Enger
- Production company: Maurice Tourneur Productions
- Distributed by: Metro Pictures
- Release date: August 15, 1920
- Running time: 6 reels
- Country: United States
- Languages: Silent; English intertitles

The Great Redeemer is a 1920 American silent Western film co-directed by Maurice Tourneur and Clarence Brown and starring House Peters, Marjorie Daw, Jack McDonald, and Joseph Singleton.

== Plot ==
A notorious outlaw in the old west named Dan Malloy made his reputation as a fearless train robber. Needing to hide out after a recent robbery, Malloy finds a secluded mountain cabin. Unfortunately, the cabin is occupied by a girl. Malloy tries to attack her, but she fends him off, wounding him. Despite the attack, the girl comes to admire his pluck. The unlikely pair become friends. During their time together, the girl talks Malloy into going on the straight and narrow. However, he wants one more big score before he calls it quits. There's a large cache of gold being transported, and Malloy makes his attempt to steal it. Unfortunately, the gold shipment story is a ploy to smoke Malloy out of hiding; he is caught and sentenced to a decade in prison for all his crimes. While in prison, Malloy begins drawing again, a hobby he had cultivated before his outlaw days. In the prison cell across the hall, a murderer is awaiting execution. Malloy draws a picture of Jesus on the cross on the wall of his prison cell, and the murderer sees that picture come to life. That experience changes the murderer, and the hardened criminal repents of his heinous crime. The picture gains fame for its life-like style as a result. After serving his sentence, the girl—now a woman—is waiting for Malloy, and they live happily ever after.

== Cast ==
- House Peters as Dan Malloy
- Marjorie Daw as The Girl
- Jack McDonald as The Sheirff
- Joseph Singleton as The Murderer
- John Gilbert (Undetermined Role (uncredited))

== Production ==
This film was the first ever to be directed by producer and director Clarence Brown.

== Preservation ==
With no prints of The Great Redeemer located in any film archives, it is considered a lost film.
