= Aunt Jane's Nieces Out West =

1914 novel by L. Frank Baum

- First edition
- Author: L. Frank Baum (as "Edith Van Dyne")
- Illustrator: James McCracken
- Language: English
- Series: Aunt Jane's Nieces
- Genre: Young adult fiction
- Publisher: Reilly & Britton
- Publication date: 1914
- Publication place: United States
- Media type: Print (Hardcover)
- Pages: 316 pp.
- Preceded by: Aunt Jane's Nieces on the Ranch
- Followed by: Aunt Jane's Nieces in the Red Cross

Aunt Jane's Nieces Out West is the penultimate novel in the Aunt Jane's Nieces series, written by L. Frank Baum as "Edith Van Dyne" and published in 1914.

In the novel, Beth de Graf and Patsy Doyle, staying in Hollywood, California after parting from their cousin's California ranch in the previous novel, stumble onto the set of a film depicting a collapsing building. Beth is horrified that they have become unwitting extras in a motion picture, for the films she has seen she found atrocious and contrived. Uncle John Merrick offers to let them meet a filmmaker before they form a lasting opinion on the medium, and this filmmaker turns out to be Otis Werner, the same director who shot the film. He argues that the building was falling apart and that the film uses a story to convey the dangers of the use of crumbling factories, for in the film, the factory owner's daughter is killed by a collapsing wall, and he is forced to rethink his life because he has done it all to provide for her.

Beth is convinced that films can have edifying messages, and along with Patsy and their cousins, Arthur Weldon and Louise Merrick Weldon, look into starting a venture of their own to produce films intended specifically for children. Uncle John is proud to support this measure.

While at a restaurant, they meet the starlet sisters Maud and Flo Stanton and their own Aunt Jane, who stay at the same hotel, the Continental, which is owned by Continental Pictures. On an afternoon off, they join the Stantons as the beach, where Maud saves a frail young man from drowning.

The man claims to be A. Jones, with no first name—a joke of his parents, his father being distantly related to John Paul Jones—a native of an island called Sangoa that his father purchased from Uruguay. He becomes devoted to the Stantons and the nieces, and claims to have the means to support a chain of twenty theatres for the girls, which will be more cost effective than the one or two that they had planned. Soon after, he presents them with pearls that he says are gathered from the island.

An jewel inspector named Isidore Le Drieux is convinced that A. Jones is the same as a jewel thief, and that Jones's pearls are stolen from a countess in Vienna. He thinks he can easily prove his case, although based on circumstantial evidence, and will soon have Jones extradited, though Uncle John and the others are quite certain, with the more information that they gather, that Le Drieux's case is full of holes and spend the rest of the novel working to prove Jones's innocence. To this effect, John Merrick hires a fresh young guitar-playing attorney, Fred A. Colby, a recent graduate of Penn Law School who has never fought a case and is eager to prove himself.

Otis Werner is a thinly veiled reference to Otis Turner, a director of The Fairylogue and Radio-Plays and a film version of John Dough and the Cherub. In this book, Baum also name-drops himself by having Uncle John make reference to fairytale authors whose work had been filmed. It also contains Edith Van Dyne's only assertion of herself in the series, stating that because she was not a pretty girl, her mother would tell her that those who have beauty have little else, which Mrs. Van Dyne uses to contrast with the brains and beauty of Maud Stanton.

The Stanton and Jones characters return in the next and final volume in the Aunt Jane's Nieces series, Aunt Jane's Nieces in the Red Cross.
