= Otis Turner =

American film director

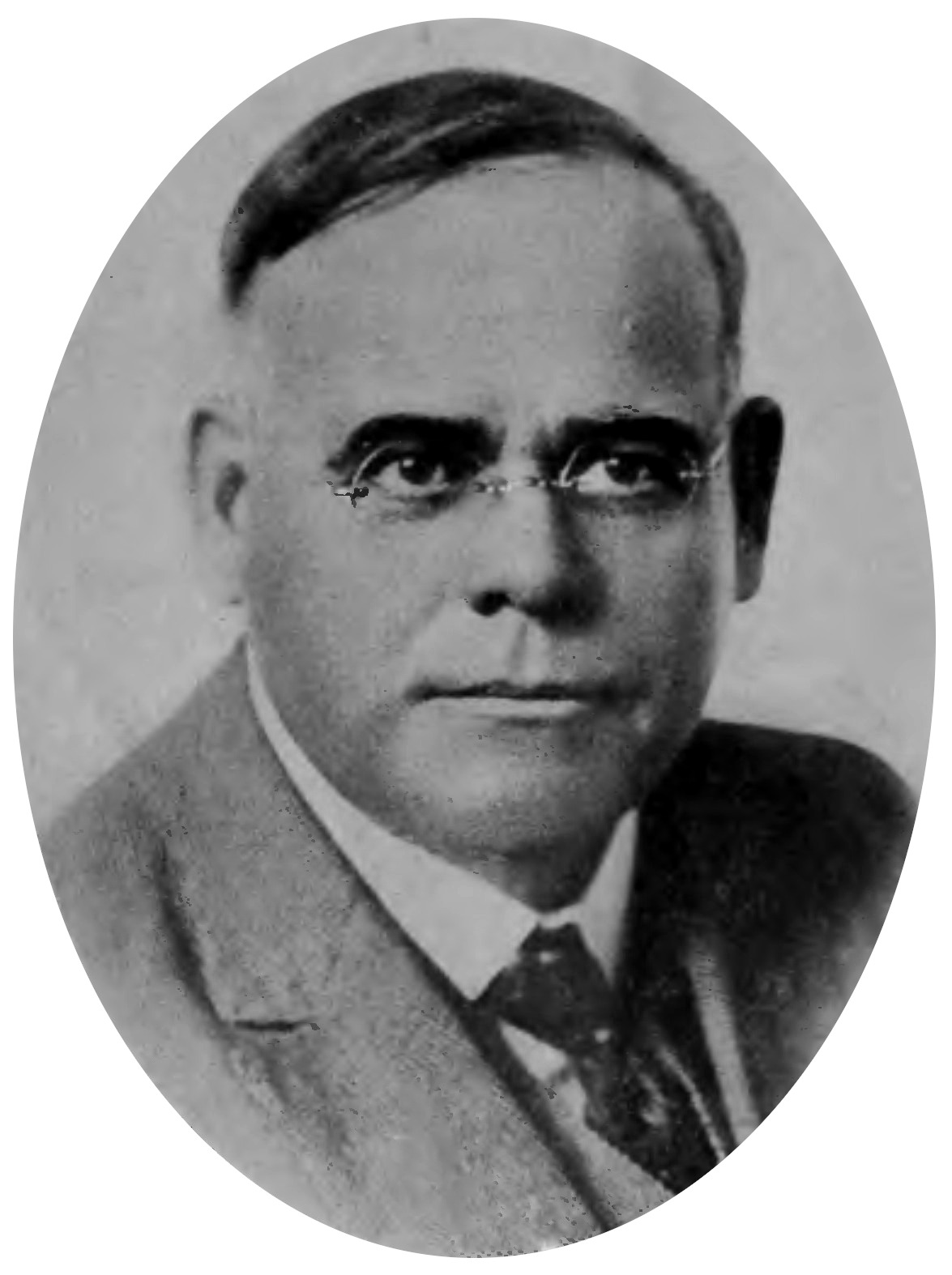
- Turner in 1915
- Born: November 29, 1862; Fairfield, Indiana, USA
- Died: March 28, 1918 (aged 55); Los Angeles, California, U.S.
- Occupation: Film director
- Years active: 1908–1918

Otis Turner (November 29, 1862 – March 28, 1918) was an American director, screenwriter and producer. Between 1908 and 1918, he directed more than 130 films and wrote 40 scenarios. He was born in Fairfield, Indiana, and died in Los Angeles in 1918, at age 55.

The producer/director Otis Werner in L. Frank Baum's Aunt Jane's Nieces Out West is a send-up of Turner, who had adapted Baum's works into films, first in collaboration with Baum, then legally but without Baum's approval.

== Selected filmography ==
- The Fairylogue and Radio-Plays (1908)
- Dr. Jekyll and Mr. Hyde (1908)
- The Cowboy Millionaire (1909)
- The Wonderful Wizard of Oz (1910)
- Human Hearts (1912 film), director
- Shon the Piper (1913)
- Called Back (1914)
- The Spy (1914)
- Damon and Pythias (1914)
- The Opened Shutters (1914)
- The Black Box (1915)
- From Italy's Shores (1915)
- Langdon's Legacy (1916)
- The Island of Desire (1917)
- Melting Millions (1917)
- The Book Agent (1917)
- The Soul of Satan (1917)
- To Honor and Obey (1917)
- Some Boy! (1917)
