= Opened Shutters =

1921 silent film

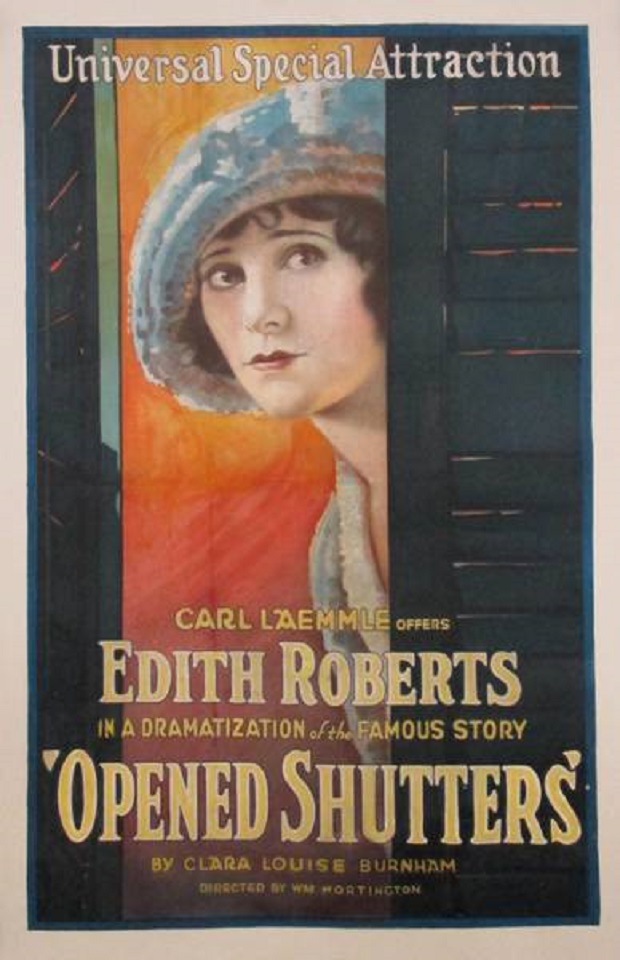
- Directed by: William Worthington
- Written by: Clara Louise Burnham (novel); Doris Schroeder
- Produced by: Carl Laemmle
- Starring: Edith Roberts; Josef Swickard; Joseph Singleton
- Cinematography: George Barnes
- Production company: Universal Pictures
- Distributed by: Universal Pictures
- Release date: August 12, 1921
- Running time: 50 minutes
- Country: United States
- Languages: Silent; English intertitles

Opened Shutters is a 1921 American silent drama film directed by William Worthington and starring Edith Roberts, Josef Swickard and Joseph Singleton. It is a remake of the 1914 film The Opened Shutters, based on a novel by Clara Louise Burnham.

== Cast ==
- Edith Roberts as Sylvia Lacey
- Josef Swickard as Sam Lacey
- Joseph Singleton as Nat Morris
- Mai Wells as Martha Lacey
- Clark Comstock as Judge Calvin Trent
- Edmund Burns as John Dunham
- Charles Clary as Jacob Johnson
- Floyce Brown as Mrs. Lem Foster
- Nola Luxford as Edna Derwent
- Andrew Waldron as Captain Lem Foster
- Lorraine Weiler as Minty

== Bibliography ==
- Connelly, Robert B. The Silents: Silent Feature Films, 1910-36, Volume 40, Issue 2. December Press, 1998.
