= Aunt Jane's Nieces at Work =

1909 novel by L. Frank Baum

- First edition
- Author: L. Frank Baum (as "Edith Van Dyne")
- Illustrator: Emile A. Nelson
- Language: English
- Series: Aunt Jane's Nieces
- Genre: Young adult fiction
- Publisher: Reilly & Britton
- Publication date: 1909
- Publication place: United States
- Media type: Print (hardcover)
- Pages: 298 pp.
- Preceded by: Aunt Jane's Nieces at Millville
- Followed by: Aunt Jane's Nieces in Society

Aunt Jane's Nieces at Work is a 1909 young adult novel, written by L. Frank Baum, famous as the creator of the Land of Oz. It is the fourth volume in the ten-book series Aunt Jane's Nieces, which was the greatest success of Baum's literary career after the Oz books themselves. Like the other books in the series, it was issued under the pen name "Edith Van Dyne," one of Baum's multiple pseudonyms.

== Synopsis ==
The novel carries forward the continuing story of the three cousins Louise Merrick, Beth De Graf, and Patsy Doyle, and their circle. The title is somewhat misleading; it could more accurately have been called Aunt Jane's Nieces in Politics. (Uncle John Merrick tells his nieces that politics is "work," which yields the title.)

The story begins three days after the end of the previous book, Aunt Jane's Nieces at Millville; the freckled and red-haired Patsy still sports a sunburn from her summer in the Adirondacks. She and Louise have received letters from their "cousin" Kenneth Forbes, the young man who inherited Aunt Jane's estate in the first book of the series. Kenneth has become involved in politics: he is running as the Republican candidate for the local seat in the New York State legislature, but thinks he is going to lose to his opponent. The family decide to go all out to help Kenneth win the election.

The cousins and Uncle John go to the rural district where Forbes's estate, Elmhurst, is located. The multi-millionaire Uncle John, the three attractive girls, and their two motorcars (rare in the district) create a sensation. Patsy campaigns among the local businessmen, Beth writes newspaper articles and press releases, and Louise concentrates on visiting the local farmers' wives. (The women cannot vote – but they will "tell their husbands how to vote.") Uncle John spreads his cash around, even buying positive coverage for Forbes in the local paper. (The fee is $250, with another $500 if and when Kenneth wins.) Kenneth's mercenary and cynical Democratic opponent, Erastus Hopkins, fights back vigorously – but, provoked by the three cousins, he intemperately takes an anti-female line that works against him. In the end, Kenneth wins easily in the normally Republican district.

Unlike most of the books in the series, Aunt Jane's Nieces at Work also possesses a significant subplot. Beth and Kenneth learn of a local girl named Lucy Rogers; after being falsely accused of theft, she suffered a mental breakdown and disappeared. Beth and Kenneth help to find the girl and get her effective psychological help. The subplot gives the book the emotional warmth, sentimentality, and human interest that is typical of the series, but somewhat lacking in the politics of the main plot.

== Party politics ==
Commentators have been divided on the significance of the party alignment in the book. Critic Fred Erisman notes that the book "specifically identifies the villains as Democrats" in keeping with "Baum's lifelong Republicanism...." Yet there is little evidence of party allegiance in Baum's life, books, or correspondence. Biographer Katharine Rogers observes that the text itself denies the significance of parties. In Baum's words, "There is no difference of importance" between the parties, "But the two parties are the positive and negative poles that provide the current of electricity for our nation, and keep it going properly. Also they safeguard our interests by watching one another."

Baum's choice to make the Democratic candidate a practitioner of "low politics" might be taken, to some degree, as a reflection of reality. Though the heyday of Boss Tweed was long passed by 1909, Tammany Hall, the New York Democratic Party political machine, was still strong at the time.

In the story, Kenneth Forbes is an idealistic and progressive reformer; one of his primary political issues is control of unrestrained commercial advertising. (Campaigns against billboards, associated with Lady Bird Johnson and the Highway Beautification Act, were not an entirely new development in the later twentieth century.)
