= Aunt Jane's Nieces on the Ranch =

1913 novel by L. Frank Baum

- First edition
- Author: L. Frank Baum (as "Edith Van Dyne")
- Illustrator: Emile A. Nelson
- Language: English
- Series: Aunt Jane's Nieces
- Genre: Young adult fiction
- Publisher: Reilly & Britton
- Publication date: 1913
- Publication place: United States
- Media type: Print (hardcover)
- Pages: 276 pp.
- Preceded by: Aunt Jane's Nieces on Vacation
- Followed by: Aunt Jane's Nieces Out West

Aunt Jane's Nieces on the Ranch is a 1913 novel by L. Frank Baum writing as "Edith Van Dyne". The novel depicts a story of racial tension on the California ranch owned by the progressive-minded Arthur Weldon and Louise Merrick Weldon, who have entrusted their baby, Jane, nicknamed "Toodlums," to a Mexican governess named Inez.

Louise's uncle, John Merrick, is not pleased with her choice and brings Mildred Travers, an American nurse from New York to serve as governess. Out of appreciation to Uncle John, the Weldons accept her as nominal head governess with Inez as an assistant, finding her of great value. Inez does not see it that way and becomes very possessive, as well as protective, of baby Jane.

The ranch was built by a Spanish lord and contains secret passages within some of the walls. Inez and some other Mexicans insist that the house is haunted, but the Weldons are convinced that the sounds are only of rats. Mildred, in fact, has a connection to the house, as her father was a friend of the former owner, who was delighted to show her the entrances to these passages that no one else has seen.
