= The Soul of Satan =

1917 film by Otis Turner

- Directed by: Otis Turner
- Written by: Randolph Lewis
- Produced by: William Fox
- Starring: Gladys Brockwell; Bertram Grassby; Charles Clary
- Production company: Fox Film
- Distributed by: Fox Film
- Release date: August 18, 1917
- Running time: 50 minutes
- Country: United States
- Languages: Silent; English intertitles

The Soul of Satan is a 1917 American silent drama film directed by Otis Turner and starring Gladys Brockwell, Bertram Grassby and Charles Clary.

== Plot ==
The lead character, Miriam Lee is leading a life of drudgery until she meets Joe Valdez who leads her down a dark road using her as the lure for his gambling where she becomes known as "the Queen of the Night."

== Cast ==
- Gladys Brockwell as Miriam Lee
- Bertram Grassby as Joe Valdez
- Charles Clary as 'Lucky' Carson
- William Burress as Alden Lee
- Josef Swickard as Chicago Stone
- Gerard Alexander as Fanny Stone
- Norbert A. Myles as Jim Calvert
- Lucille Young as Helen Valdez
- Frankie Lee as Miriam's Brother
- Marie Kiernan as Miriam's Sister

== Bibliography ==
- Solomon, Aubrey. The Fox Film Corporation, 1915-1935: A History and Filmography. McFarland, 2011.
