= To Honor and Obey =

- Advertisement for the film
- Directed by: Otis Turner
- Screenplay by: F. McGrew Willis
- Story by: Olga Printzlau
- Produced by: William Fox
- Starring: Gladys Brockwell; Bertram Grassby; Charles Clary; Josef Swickard
- Cinematography: Charles Kaufman
- Production company: Fox Film Corporation
- Distributed by: Fox Film Corporation
- Release date: July 15, 1917
- Running time: 5 reels
- Country: United States
- Language: Silent (English intertitles)

To Honor and Obey is a 1917 silent drama film directed by Otis Turner. It was produced and distributed by the Fox Film Corporation.

== Plot ==
Richard Hallam and Marc Patton both love Lorrie Hollis, a cabaret performer. Hallam and Lorrie are married and are very happy. Hallam finds himself almost ruined and asks Lorrie to go to Patton and ask him to manipulate the market so that Hallam will be reinbursed Lorrie does and with riches Hallam finds himself hating his wife. He finally turns to Kose Delvane. Hallam loses faith in his wire and drives her from his home. Patton becomes enraged and operates the market so that Hallam loses every cent. Rose will have nothing to do with him and Hallam commits suicide. Patton and Lorrie finally find happiness together.

== Cast ==
- Gladys Brockwell as Lorrie Hollis
- Bertram Grassby as Richard Hallam
- Charles Clary as Marc Patton
- Josef Swickard as James Hollis
- Willard Louis as Alphonse Kronin
- Jewel Carmen as Rose Delvane

== Reception ==
A contemporary review in Moving Picture World was positive, with the reviewer calling it the best film he had seen in "some weeks".

A review in the Plain Dealer was also positive, praising the film's directing and cinematography.
