= Fools in the Dark =

1924 film

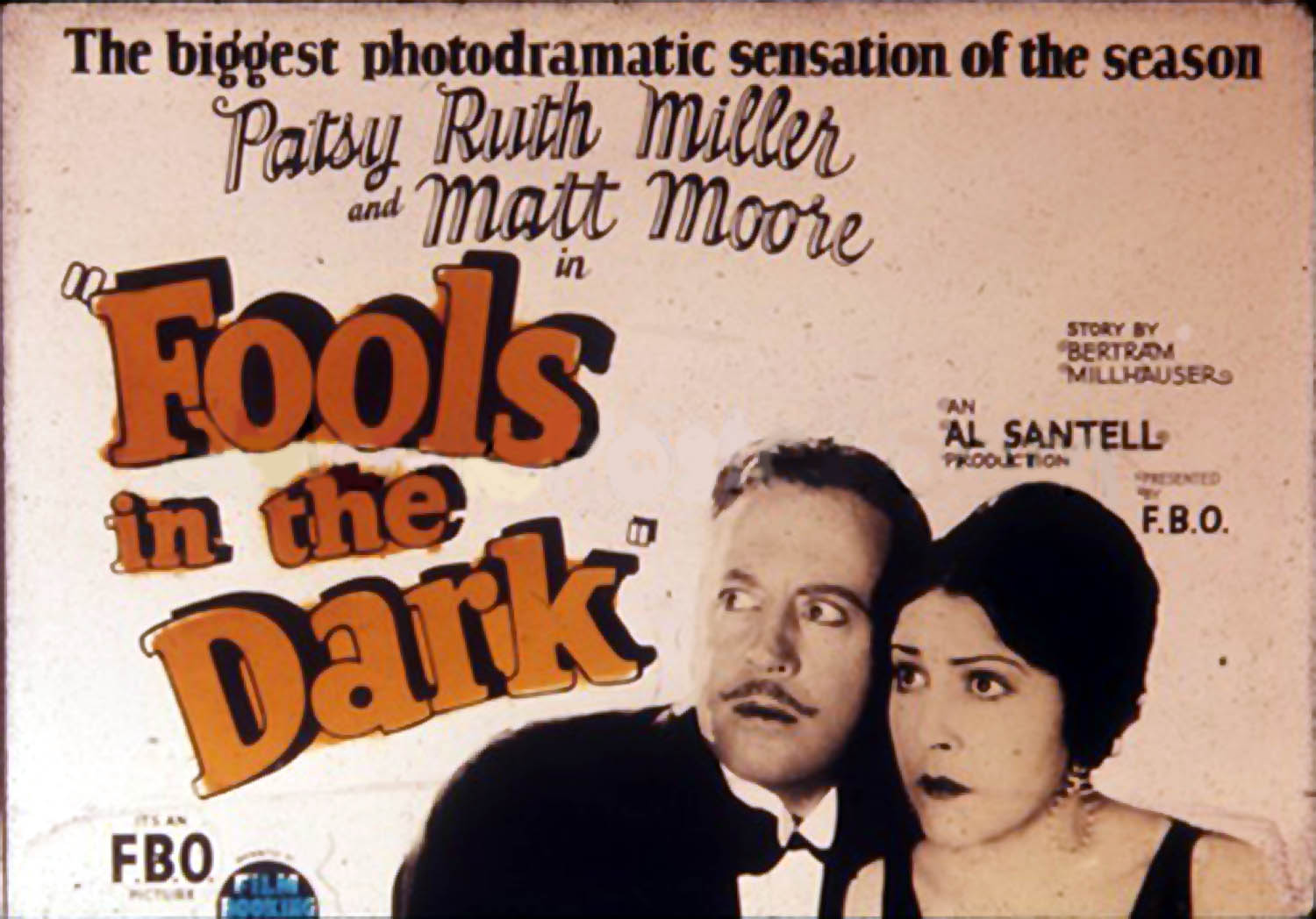
- Directed by: Alfred Santell
- Written by: Bertram Millhauser; John Grey
- Starring: Patsy Ruth Miller; Matt Moore; Bertram Grassby
- Cinematography: Leon Eycke; Blake Wagner
- Production company: Robertson-Cole Pictures Corporation
- Distributed by: Film Booking Offices of America
- Release date: August 4, 1924
- Running time: 70 minutes
- Country: United States
- Languages: Silent; English intertitles

Fools in the Dark is a 1924 American silent comedy film directed by Alfred Santell and starring Patsy Ruth Miller, Matt Moore and Bertram Grassby.

== Cast ==
- Patsy Ruth Miller as Ruth Rand
- Matt Moore as Percy Schwartz / Percy Primrose
- Bertram Grassby as Kotah - Dr. Rand's Servant
- Charles Belcher as Dr. Rand
- Tom Wilson as Diploma' - Percys Black Valet
- John Steppling as Julius Schwartz

== Bibliography ==
- Connelly, Robert B. The Silents: Silent Feature Films, 1910-36, Volume 40, Issue 2. December Press, 1998.
- Munden, Kenneth White. The American Film Institute Catalog of Motion Pictures Produced in the United States, Part 1. University of California Press, 1997.
