= The Signal Tower =

1924 film by Clarence Brown

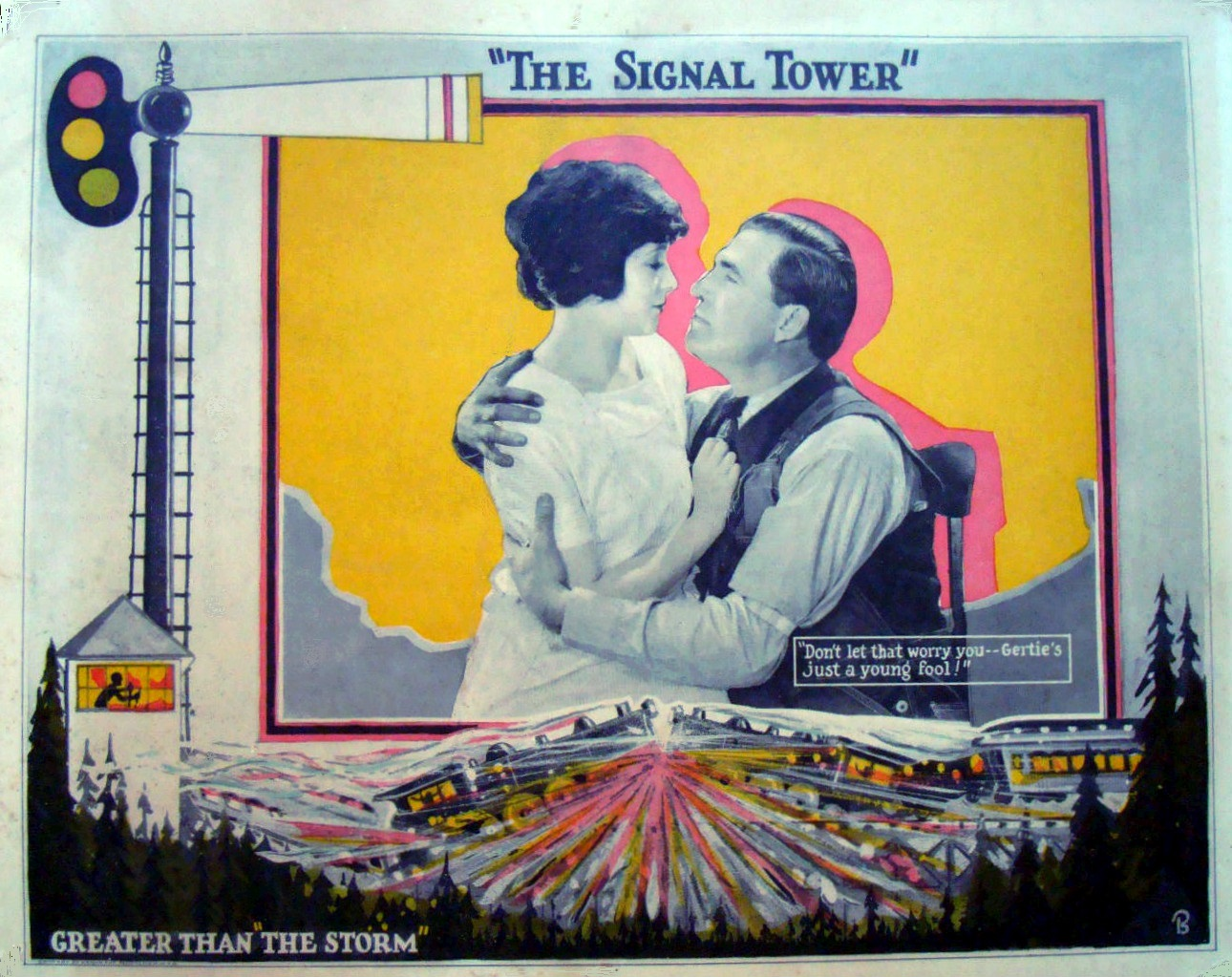
- Lobby card
- Directed by: Clarence Brown
- Written by: James O. Spearing (scenario)
- Based on: "The Signal Tower" by Wadsworth Camp
- Produced by: Carl Laemmle
- Starring: Virginia Valli; Rockliffe Fellowes; Wallace Beery
- Cinematography: Ben F. Reynolds
- Distributed by: Universal Pictures
- Release date: August 3, 1924
- Running time: 70 minutes
- Country: United States
- Language: Silent (English intertitles)

The Signal Tower is a 1924 American silent drama film directed by Clarence Brown and produced and distributed by Universal Pictures. It stars Virginia Valli, Rockliffe Fellowes and Wallace Beery.

== Cast ==
- Virginia Valli as Sally Taylor
- Rockliffe Fellowes as Dave Taylor
- Frankie Darro as Sonny Taylor
- Wallace Beery as Joe Standish
- James O. Barrows as Old Bill
- J. Farrell MacDonald as Pete
- Dot Farley as Cousin Gertie
- Clarence Brown as Switch Man
- Jitney the Dog as Jitney

== Preservation ==
A 16 mm copy of The Signal Tower is preserved by the UCLA Film & Television Archive.
