= The Toll Gate =

1920 film

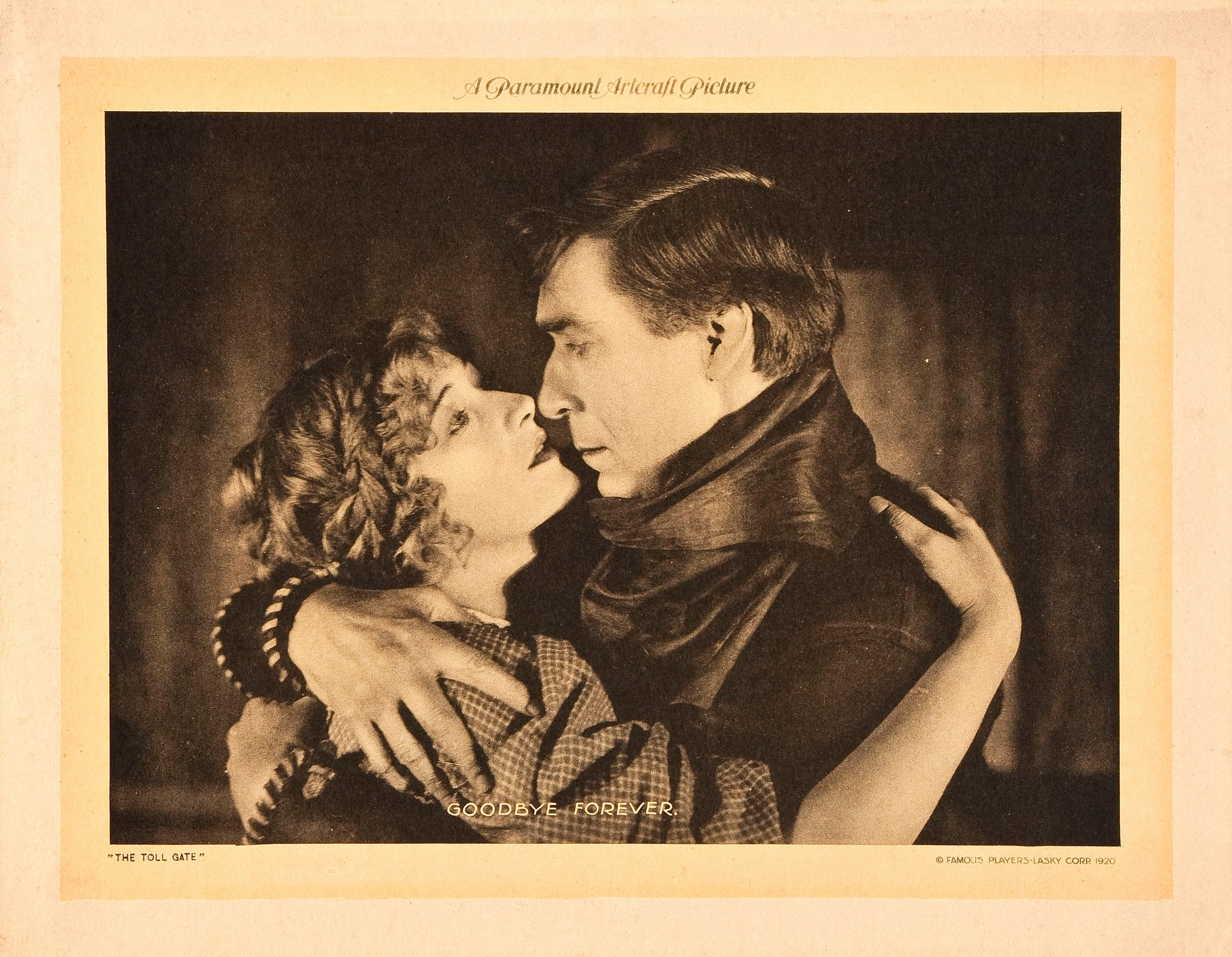
- Lobby card featuring Anna Q. Nilsson and William S. Hart
- Directed by: Lambert Hillyer
- Screenplay by: William S. Hart; Lambert Hillyer
- Produced by: William S. Hart
- Starring: William S. Hart; Anna Q. Nilsson; Joseph Singleton; Jack Richardson; Richard Headrick
- Cinematography: Joseph H. August
- Edited by: LeRoy Stone
- Production company: William S. Hart Productions
- Distributed by: Paramount Pictures
- Release date: April 15, 1920
- Running time: 73 minutes
- Country: United States
- Languages: Silent; English intertitles

The Toll Gate is a 1920 American silent Western film directed by Lambert Hillyer, written by Lambert Hillyer and William S. Hart, and starring William S. Hart, Anna Q. Nilsson, Joseph Singleton, Jack Richardson, and Richard Headrick. It was released on April 15, 1920, by Paramount Pictures.

== Plot ==
As described in a film magazine, bandit leader Black Deering leads his band on what he declares to be their last raid only to be captured when Tom Jordan, one of the members, betrays him to the authorities. Deering escapes and attempts to reach the Mexican border. However, hunger forces him to enter a western town. Here he meets Jordan, whose opposition results in a burning of the town and Deering's escape and pursuit by a posse. He takes shelter in the home of Mary Brown, a widow who lives in a lonely cabin with her little son. She willingly poses as Deering's wife, but the Sheriff is not convinced and asks permission to house his men in the cabin for the night. This brings about the situation where Deering, on his honor, must reveal his identity. News comes of a threatened attack by Jordan on members of the posse, and Deering requests the opportunity to die fighting and is given it. During the fight Deering kills Jordan, who is Mary Brown's missing husband. The Sheriff grants Deering his freedom.

== Cast ==
- William S. Hart as Black Deering
- Anna Q. Nilsson as Mary Brown
- Joseph Singleton as Tom Jordan
- Jack Richardson as The Sheriff
- Richard Headrick as The Little Feller
- Bill Patton as Hank Simmons (uncredited)
- Leo Willis as Soldier (uncredited)

== Preservation ==
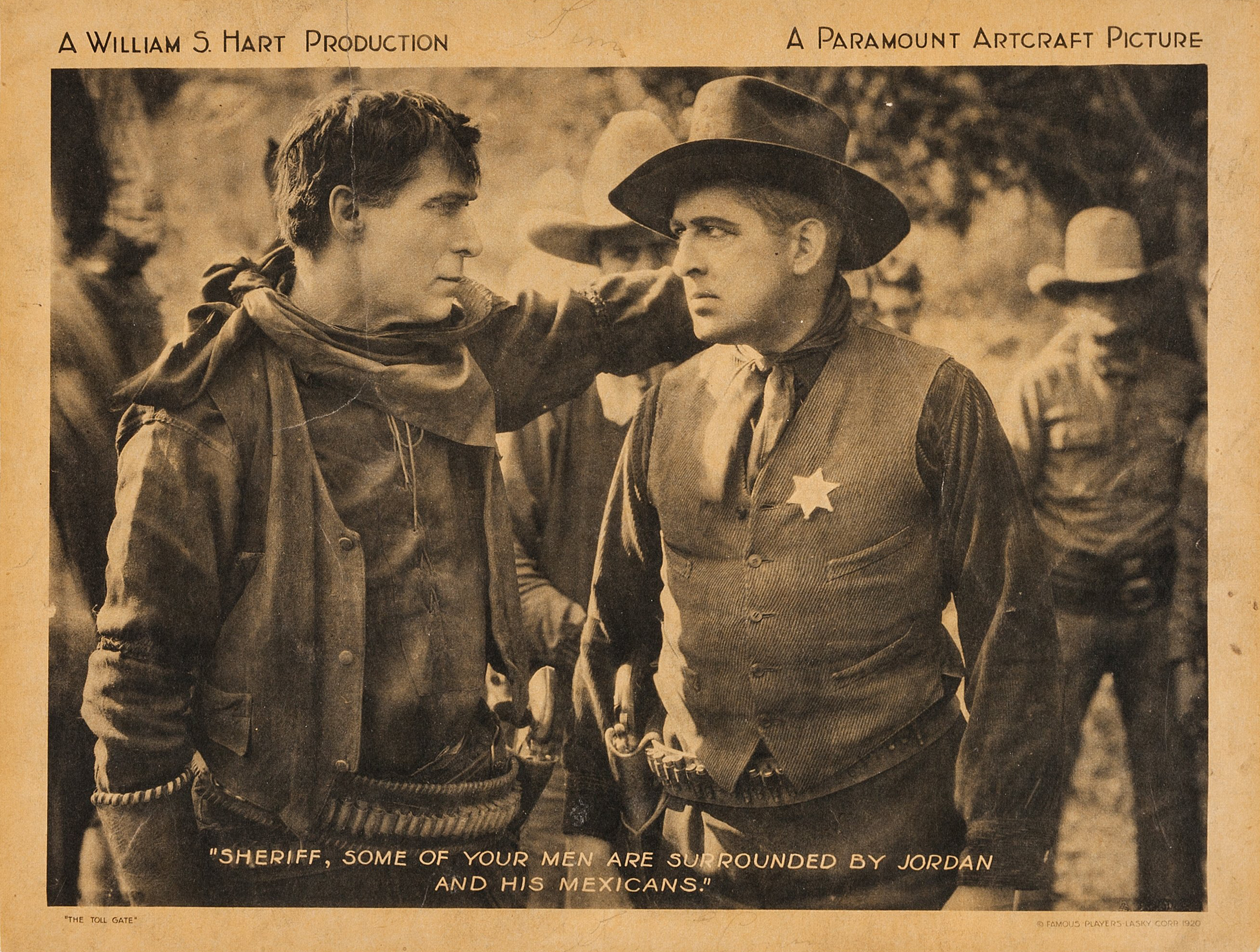
William S. Hart and Jack Richardson in The Toll Gate

Copies of The Toll Gate are in the Library of Congress, Museum of Modern Art film archive, and the George Eastman Museum Motion Picture Collection. The film has also been released on DVD.
