= Aunt Jane's Nieces at Millville =

1908 young adult novel written by L. Frank Baum

- First edition
- Author: L. Frank Baum (as "Edith Van Dyne")
- Illustrator: Emile A. Nelson
- Language: English
- Genre: Young adult fiction Detective fiction Satire; Comedy
- Publisher: Reilly & Britton
- Publication date: 1908
- Publication place: United States
- Media type: Print (hardcover)
- Pages: 306 pp.
- Preceded by: Aunt Jane's Nieces Abroad
- Followed by: Aunt Jane's Nieces at Work

Aunt Jane's Nieces at Millville is a 1908 young adult novel written by L. Frank Baum, famous as the creator of the Land of Oz. It is the third volume in "the successful Aunt Jane Series," following Aunt Jane's Nieces and Aunt Jane's Nieces Abroad. These books for adolescent girls constituted the second greatest success of Baum's literary career, after the Oz books. Like the other books in the series, the Millville volume was released under the pen name "Edith Van Dyne," one of Baum's multiple pseudonyms.

== Genre ==
Novels for adolescent readers can take many specific forms: after the family inheritance drama of Aunt Jane's Nieces and the travel adventure of Aunt Jane's Nieces Abroad, Baum cast his third book as a small-town drama with a bucolic atmosphere, in which a traditional society is contrasted with the world of the nouveau-riche rising business class. In this, the book resembles Baum's earlier novel Annabel (1906). In the view of Baum biographer Katharine Rogers, "the substance" of the Millville book "is humor at the expense of the local yokels."

The novel has other aspects too, however. Baum would spend much of the last decade of his writing career working in the girl-detective vein — in his books The Daring Twins and Phoebe Daring (1911–12) and in the first five books of the Mary Louise series (1916–20). Yet he made his first ventures in the genre in some of the Aunt Jane books, notably here in the third book of the series. His handling of the detective genre here is satiric, though; the three cousins are influenced in their detecting effort by the novels they have read – and their efforts are soon shown to be misguided and erroneous. (The plot does eventually resolve itself as something of a detective story, as the Merrick clan solves a mystery involving the fate of key supporting characters. The plot features a locked cabinet with a secret compartment – with another secret compartment inside that.)

Baum spreads his gentle and genial satire to other targets too, even to the popular fiction of his era. One character is a habitual reader of the "paper-covered novels" of the day, including one specific title, The Angel Maniac's Revenge.

== Synopsis ==
Aunt Jane's Nieces at Millville picks up the story of the three cousins, Patsy Doyle, Beth De Graf, and Louise Merrick, soon after their return from Europe in Aunt Jane's Nieces Abroad. As in that earlier book, their benign and eccentric millionaire Uncle John devotes much of his fortune to helping others – an effort managed by Patsy's father, Major Doyle. These efforts do not always yield fiscally sound results: in one case, Merrick and Doyle loaned a few thousand dollars to a young inventor named Joseph Wegg for a patent he was developing – but Wegg lost a patent lawsuit, and Merrick now owns the collateral on Wegg's loan, a farm in a remote region of upper New York State. In his capricious way, Merrick decides to take his nieces to the farm to escape the city's heat during the approaching summer; he arranges for a real-estate agent to get the farmhouse in good order and ships crates of furnishings to the place, sight unseen.

Merrick and his three nieces come north, and find the farmhouse a surprisingly appealing place. The local inhabitants of a tiny village in the northern foothills of the Adirondack Mountains are naturally interested in the new residents; they call Merrick "the nabob." The girls quickly become fascinated by the family of the previous owner. Joe Wegg's father had been a retired sea captain, and something of a recluse; his close friend Will Thompson went mad when Captain Wegg died, and both of their fortunes mysteriously disappeared. The girls meet and become friends with Thompson's daughter Ethel, the local schoolteacher. Also, the cousins (with Louise in the lead; she takes a more prominent role in this book than in the previous volumes) decide that Captain Wegg was murdered and robbed, and set about in search of suspects.

They pry into the local past with limited results; but matters begin to clear when Joe Wegg returns home to convalesce from a car accident. The girls are dispirited to learn that there was no murder and no robbery. It is Uncle John who unravels a genuine mystery, as to the fate to the Wegg and Thompson fortunes. He recovers a missing deed that ensures that Joe Wegg and Ethel Thompson can marry in comfort and security.

== City and country ==
As Rogers observed, Baum pokes fun at some of the small-minded habits of small-town people in this book. The real-estate agent is a comic stereotype of village crudity, pettiness, and envy; and one chapter is devoted to a bumpkin's inept attempt at finding a rich wife among the cousins. Yet Baum's view of urban and rural manners does not lean wholly one way. Baum approvingly contrasts the relative moral innocence or "simplicity" of the country with the "guile" of the city; and the three cousins are praised because they are "so simple," without being "cityfied" or "stuck up."

(The Aunt Jane's Nieces books have been studied for the light they cast on the "Progressive dilemma" of adapting "rural ideals to a complex urban society.")

== Commonalities ==
Elements of Baum's other books, and also of his biography, turn up in Aunt Jane's Nieces at Millville. The Wegg farm's servant Tom Hucks is described as

"A tall man, much bent at the shoulder and limping in one leg from an old hurt aggravated by rheumatism. His form was as gnarled as the tree-trunks in the apple orchard, and twisted almost as fantastically."

Readers of the Oz books will recognize him as a precursor of Dr. Pipt in The Patchwork Girl of Oz (1913). The Millville book repeatedly mentions Plymouth Rock poultry; Baum was a devotee of Hamburg poultry, and published a book on the subject in 1896.
