= The Moral Law =

1918 film by Bertram Bracken

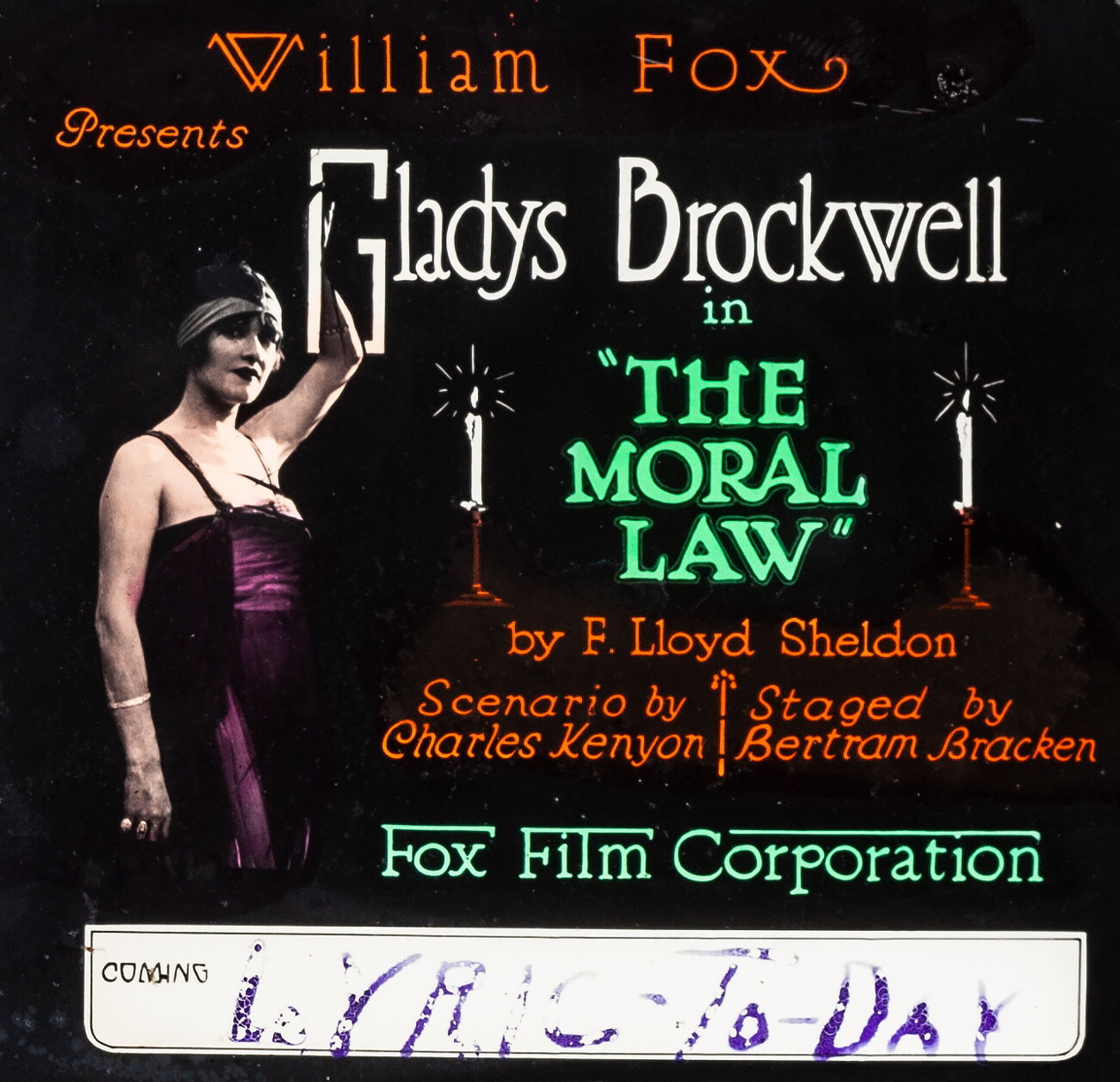
- Lantern slide
- Directed by: Bertram Bracken
- Written by: Charles Kenyon (scenario)
- Story by: E. Lloyd Sheldon
- Starring: Gladys Brockwell; Rosita Marstini; Joseph Singleton
- Cinematography: Charles Kaufman
- Production company: Fox Film Corporation
- Distributed by: Fox Film Corporation
- Release date: February 17, 1918
- Running time: 5 reels
- Country: United States
- Languages: Silent film (English intertitles)

The Moral Law is a 1918 American silent drama film directed by Bertram Bracken and starring Gladys Brockwell in a dual role, Rosita Marstini, and Joseph Singleton. The story was written by E. Lloyd Sheldon. The film was released by Fox Film Corporation on February 17, 1918, as a Fox Special Features release.

== Plot ==
According to a film magazine, the two girls were half-sisters and much alike in face and form, but the soul of one was pure and white and that of the other black with the dregs of sin. In New York, Isobel de Costa is kept unaware of her father’s previous marriage and the existence of his former wife and daughter until his death. She seeks to aid them and meets only treachery and deceit, nearly perishing in a South American prison.

== Cast ==
- Gladys Brockwell as Isobel de Costa / Anita de Costa
- Rosita Marstini as Maruja de Costa
- Joseph Singleton as Umberto
- Colin Chase as Robert Grant
- Bertram Grassby as Donn Pedro
- Cora Rankin Drew as Chinta

== Reception ==
The film was not well received with poor photography and descriptions of it as not pleasing.

== Preservation ==
It is unknown whether the film survives as no copies have been located, likely lost.
