= Joseph Singleton =

Australian actor (1879–1946)

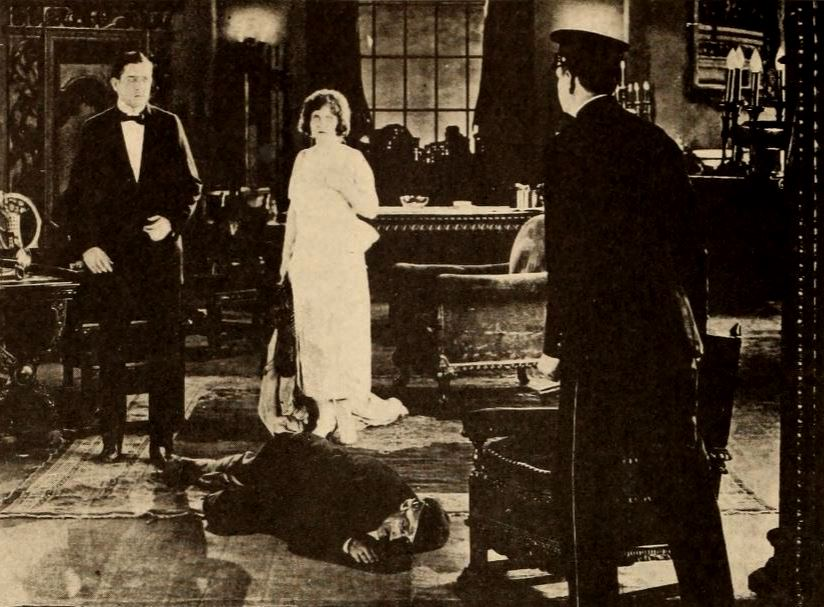
- Singleton dead on the floor in The Bait (1921)
- Born: Joseph Edward Victor Fairfield Daveran Singleton; 1 March 1879; Melbourne, Australia
- Died: 24 October 1946 (aged 67)
- Occupation: Actor
- Years active: 1913–25

Joseph Edward Victor Fairfield Daveran Singleton (1 March 1879 – 24 October 1946) was an actor of the silent era. An Australian, he appeared in 74 films between 1913 and 1925. He was born in Melbourne.

== Selected filmography ==
- Shon the Piper (1913)
- The Squaw Man (1914)
- Brewster's Millions (1914)
- Infatuation (1915)
- Judge Not; or The Woman of Mona Diggings (1915)
- Jordan Is a Hard Road (1915)
- Daphne and the Pirate (1916)
- The Good Bad-Man (1916)
- Betsy's Burglar (1917)
- Wild and Woolly (1917) (uncredited)
- A Girl of the Timber Claims (1917)
- Aladdin and the Wonderful Lamp (1917)
- Desert Law (1918)
- The Lady of the Dugout (1918)
- Inside the Lines (1918)
- The Moral Law (1918)
- The Enchanted Barn (1919)
- The Midnight Man (1919)
- The Mayor of Filbert (1919)
- Treasure Island (1920)
- The Toll Gate (1920)
- The Great Redeemer (1920)
- Opened Shutters (1921)
- The Fighting Lover (1921)
- Cameron of the Royal Mounted (1921)
- The Bait (1921)
- Skin Deep (1922)
- Secrets of the Night (1924)
