= Aunt Jane's Nieces on Vacation =

1912 novel by L. Frank Baum

- First edition
- Author: L. Frank Baum (as "Edith Van Dyne")
- Illustrator: Emile A. Nelson
- Language: English
- Genre: Young adult fiction
- Publisher: Reilly & Britton
- Publication date: 1912
- Publication place: United States
- Media type: Print (hardcover)
- Pages: 305 pp.
- Preceded by: Aunt Jane's Nieces and Uncle John
- Followed by: Aunt Jane's Nieces on the Ranch

Aunt Jane's Nieces on Vacation is a 1912 novel by L. Frank Baum, writing under the name "Edith Van Dyne". Baum's intended title was the more accurate Aunt Jane's Nieces in Journalism, but the publisher changed it without telling him, to his consternation.

The title is true enough to begin with. John Merrick and his nieces, return to their vacation home in Millville, in upstate New York. The three girls, Patsy Doyle, Beth De Graf, and Louise Merrick Weldon, become bored with vacationing and want to participate more in town life. Beth is a regular reader of newspapers, so with Uncle John's money, they decide to establish a newspaper of their own, with stereotype plates from the wire service liberally peppered with local news and gossip. The latter is primarily handled by Louise. Her husband, Arthur Weldon, has his name highest on the masthead (as was common with female-run organizations at the time), which gets him forced into a duel with one of the yokels.

The main plot, however, comes from the problems introduced by greedy mill owners in the area attempting to scam the town. Most of the employees are white ethnics whom the locals hold in contempt.

Baum fills the town with colorful characters, and the girls realize that all people are unique and quirky, and not to be judged as "the masses." He also brings back the character of private detective Quintus Fogerty, introduced in Aunt Jane's Nieces in Society, to help resolve plot complications.
