= Aunt Jane's Nieces Abroad =

1907 novel written by L. Frank Baum

- First edition
- Author: L. Frank Baum (as "Edith Van Dyne")
- Illustrator: Emile A. Nelson
- Language: English
- Genre: Young adult fiction
- Publisher: Reilly & Britton
- Publication date: 1907
- Publication place: United States
- Media type: Print (hardcover)
- Pages: 347 pp.
- Preceded by: Aunt Jane's Nieces
- Followed by: Aunt Jane's Nieces at Millville

Aunt Jane's Nieces Abroad is a young adult novel written by L. Frank Baum, famous as the creator of the Land of Oz. It was the second volume in the ten-novel series Aunt Jane's Nieces, which was, after the Oz books, the second greatest success of Baum's literary career. Like the other books in the series, the novel appeared under the pen name "Edith Van Dyne," one of Baum's multiple pseudonyms.

== Date ==
Though the original edition of Aunt Jane's Nieces Abroad bore the publication date "1906" (the same year as its predecessor book, Aunt Jane's Nieces), the book was actually published "late in 1907." (Baum's adult novel The Last Egyptian, issued in the same period, bears a copyright date of 1907 and a publication date of 1908.)

== Background ==
In writing the book, Baum faced the task of creating an effective sequel to a successful novel. He enriched his story with abundant real-world observation and local color. Baum and his wife had taken an extensive tour of Egypt and the Mediterranean region in the first six months of 1906; and Baum exploited the experiences of that trip for his book. The Baums had witnessed the eruption of Vesuvius on April 7, 1906; Baum used the eruption as a central event in his novel. The characters in Aunt Jane's Nieces Abroad follow some of the Baums' Italian itinerary closely, even staying at the same hotels as the Baums had done.

== Synopsis ==
The second book in the Aunt Jane's series picks up where the first left off. The eccentric and down-to-earth millionaire John Merrick decides to take his three beloved nieces – Patsy Doyle, Elizabeth de Graf, and Louise Merrick – on a tour of Europe. The parents of the three girls react variously, but don't oppose the trip; Mrs. Merrick, Louise's mother, wants to accompany them as chaperone, a prospect that Uncle John rejects out of hand. Still, Mrs. Merrick allows her daughter to go; she wants to separate Louise from Arthur Weldon, the young man who has been courting her. (The social-climbing Mrs. Merrick is desperate for Louise to land a rich husband. Weldon's father is a wealthy railroad magnate, but the father and son are in a clash of generations and the elder Weldon threatens to disown the younger.)

Uncle John and the three cousins embark for Europe, and make new acquaintances aboard ship. Among them is a somewhat sinister and mysterious man called Victor Valdi, who combines "refinement and barbarity" in his manner. Patsy goes out of her way to draw him out of his sullen silence, to "make him talk and 'be sociable'." The tourists reach Italy, where they witness an eruption by Vesuvius and cope with the public's fears and a layer of ash in the streets of Naples. They consider a detour, but decide to carry on intrepidly. They encounter a local aristocrat, the Count of Ferralti, who fancies Louise – though the clever Uncle John quickly realizes that he is only a pretend nobleman. John warns Louise of the young man's pretense, but otherwise allows the acquaintance, especially when Ferralti proves a courageous help in a near-disaster on the road.

At Taormina, the travelers meet Victor Valdi again; he appears more sinister and mysterious than ever in his native element, where he is called "Il Duca." There is much talk of the danger of "brigands" in Sicily — though the local people cheerfully insist that "There are no brigands" in Sicily, an ironic refrain that winds through the book. Quickly enough, both Uncle John and Ferralti are waylaid by Valdi, who is the chief local brigand, and makes a living for his family and followers by kidnapping tourists and holding them for ransom. Uncle John learns the ways of Valdi's curious establishment, which includes his ruthless mother and his daughter Tato, who masquerades as a boy to serve as her father's henchman.

After initial resistance, Uncle John reconciles himself to paying the ransom for his life and freedom; but his nieces and friends are unwilling to yield to bandits, and stage a bold and effective rescue of Uncle John and Ferralti. It is revealed that the false Count Ferralti is actually Arthur Weldon; he has come to Europe in disguise to be with Louise. Uncle John lets the two young people continue to see each other, as long as there is no talk of marriage yet. (News has arrived that Weldon's father has died in a railway accident, and that Arthur is now a wealthy heir.)

The Americans are surprised a few days later, when Valdi and Tato appear at their hotel. While Tato was acting as the go-between in the ransom plot, the girl and Patsy had become something like friends; with typical generosity of spirit, Patsy does not blame the girl for the actions of her family. Now, Valdi asks the Americans to take Tato under their charge for a time; Valdi is trying to leave brigandage behind and take up an honest life. The cousins naively accept Tato, and enjoy dressing her in a new wardrobe and teaching her manners. They are surprised again when Tato absconds with the ransom cash ($50,000 of Uncle John's money and $30,000 of Weldon's); the girl leaves a cheerful but mocking letter behind her, explaining the ruse.

Having learned their lesson, the travelers complete their tour through Italy, Switzerland, and France, and gratefully return home.

== Americans and guns ==
Throughout the book, the characters place great stress on their special nationality. This is most noticeable in their confrontation with Valdi and his kidnap plot. Beth puts it most blatantly when she cries, "It's a beastly shame that free born Americans should be enslaved by a crew of thieving Sicilians, and obliged to purchase their freedom!" — but the other characters are nearly as vocal. (The word "American," singular or plural, occurs 58 times in Baum's text.) Valdi is a supremely successful brigand, until he encounters the Americans' pride, courage, and resourcefulness; conversely, the Americans' frank and generous kindness leaves them open to victimization.

The patriotic self-satisfaction turns ugly only once, when Patsy "gleefully" tells her Uncle John after his rescue, "Did you think your nieces would let you be robbed by a bunch of dagoes?" (Perhaps momentary high spirits can excuse the normally better-behaved girl.)

The Americans are so formidable in part because they are so heavily armed. Beth carries her "pet revolver" and Uncle John has two in his trunks; "cousin" Kenneth Forbes and American friend Silas Watson carry guns when in Sicily. As the cousins prepare to rescue Uncle John and Ferralti/Weldon, Patsy sticks a "pop-gun" in "the bosom of her dress...." When Kenneth asks her if she can shoot, she replies, "No, but I suppose the pistol can. I know enough to pull the trigger."

== Characters ==
To make his sequel effective, Baum needed to develop and deepen his continuing characters. In the first book, Louise was willing to follow her mother's lead in searching for a rich husband; but in the second she favors Arthur Weldon even when he runs a risk of disinheritance, suggesting a greater sincerity, sensitivity, and independence. Beth is the most formidable of the cousins; she carries a revolver and is a crack shot. Yet in the climactic confrontation with Valdi, she faints when the bullet she fires hits Valdi's finger and draws blood; afterward she swears she will never fire a weapon again. This display of a softer side tends to balance out her personality. Even Kenneth Forbes, the cousin who actually inherited Aunt Jane's estate in the first book, reveals unexpected depths of pluck and spirit.
