= Enter Madame =

Enter Madame may refer to:

- Enter Madame (play)
- Enter Madame (1922 film)
- Enter Madame (1935 film)
