= Romance (1930 film) =

1930 American film

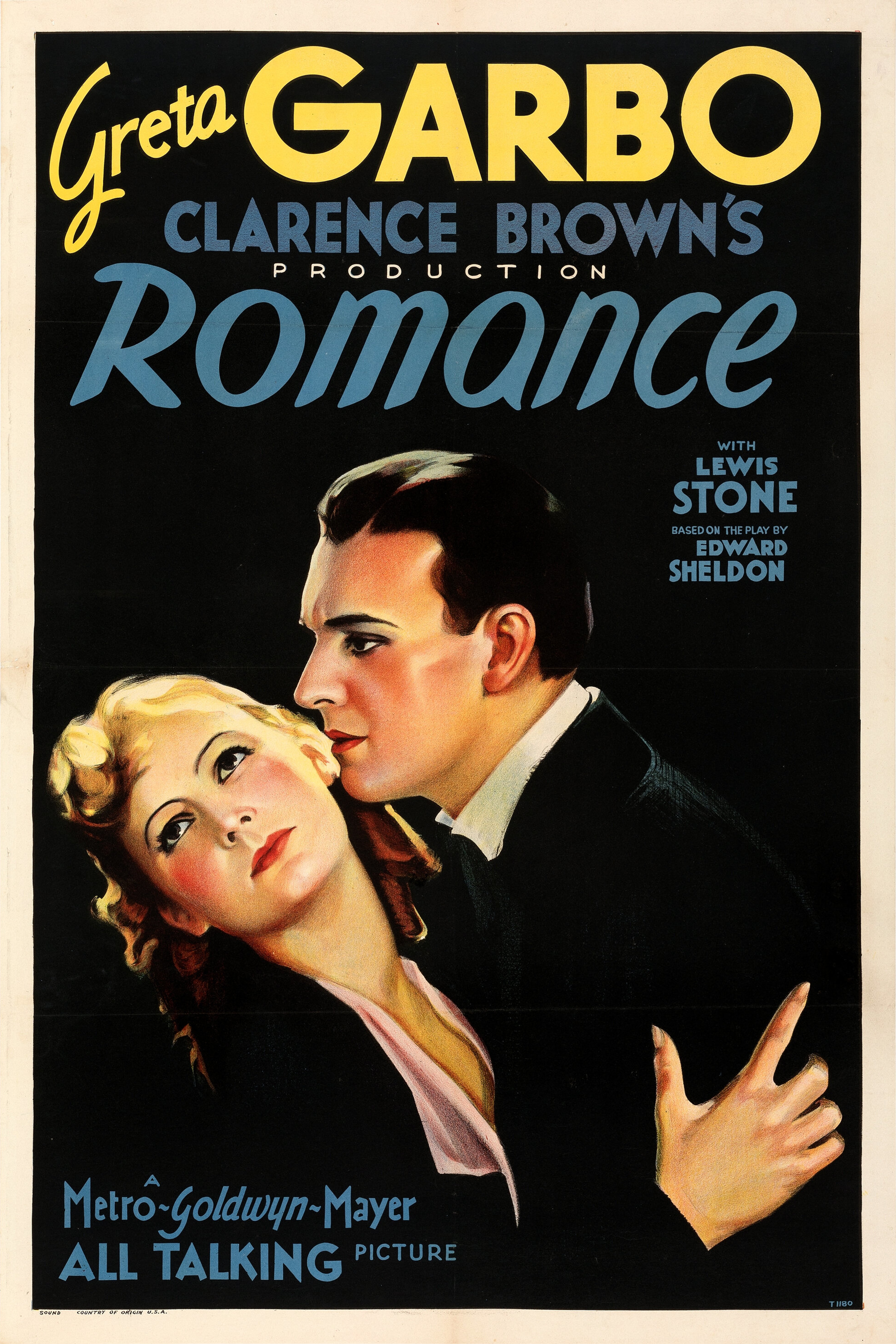
- Theatrical release poster
- Directed by: Clarence Brown
- Written by: Edwin Justus Mayer; Bess Meredyth
- Based on: Romance; 1913 play by Edward Sheldon
- Produced by: Clarence Brown
- Starring: Greta Garbo; Lewis Stone
- Cinematography: William H. Daniels
- Edited by: Hugh Wynn
- Music by: William Axt
- Distributed by: Metro-Goldwyn-Mayer
- Release date: August 22, 1930
- Running time: 76 minutes
- Country: United States
- Language: English

Romance is a 1930 American pre-Code film directed by Clarence Brown, and starring Greta Garbo, Lewis Stone, and Gavin Gordon. Based on the 1913 play by Edward Sheldon, the film was written by Edwin Justus Mayer and Bess Meredyth, and distributed by Metro-Goldwyn-Mayer.

The play was previously adapted as a 1920 silent film starring Doris Keane, the actress in Sheldon's 1913 play.

== Plot ==
Romance (1930)

On New Year's Eve, Harry tells his grandfather, a bishop, that he intends to marry an actress, even though that is frowned upon by his social class. However, his grandfather recounts via flashback a cautionary tale of a great love affair with a "fallen woman" during his own youth.

When he is 28 years old, Tom Armstrong, the son of an aristocratic family and the rector of St. Giles, meets the famous Italian opera star Rita Cavallini at an evening party given by Cornelius Van Tuyl. Tom falls in love with Rita even though there are rumors that she is Van Tuyl's mistress. Tom's family disapproves of Rita, but he continues to pursue her until he discovers that she has been lying to him about the true nature of her relationship with Van Tuyl. Though he forgives and loves her, their different lives and different social classes make an engagement untenable. Ultimately, Tom marries Harry's grandmother.

In a surprise ending, he counsels Harry to marry the woman he loves, regardless of the consequences.

== Cast ==
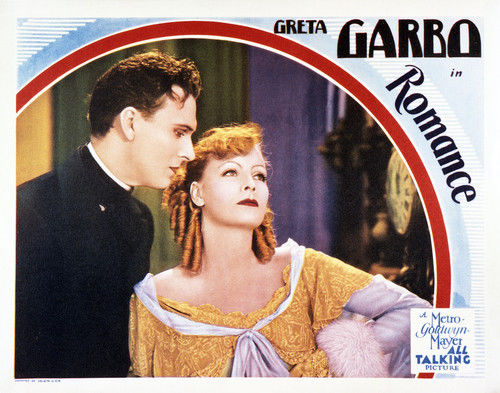

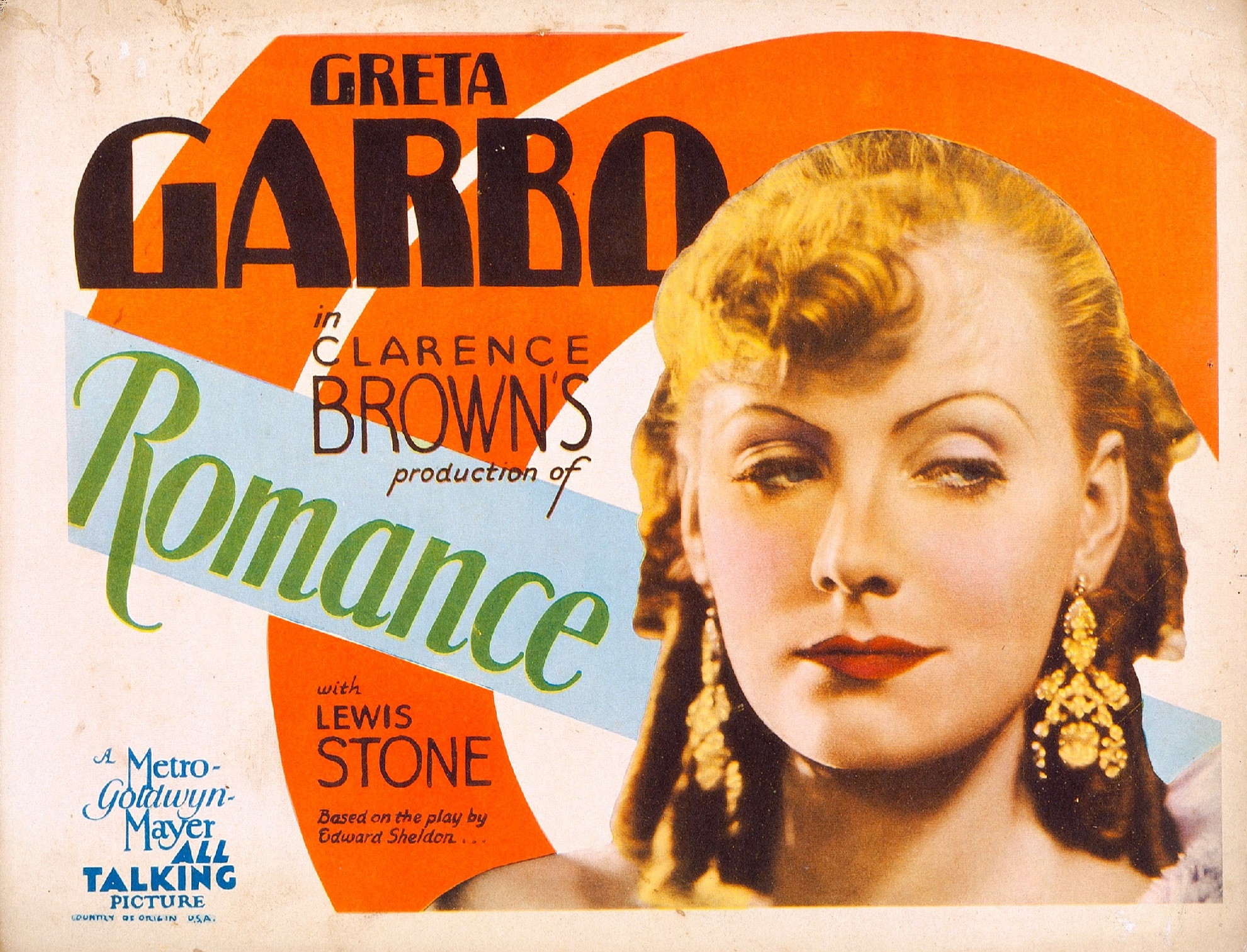

- Greta Garbo as Rita Cavallini
- Lewis Stone as Cornelius Van Tuyl
- Gavin Gordon as Tom Armstrong
- Elliott Nugent as Harry
- Florence Lake as Susan Van Tuyl
- Clara Blandick as Abigail Armstrong
- Henry Armetta as Beppo
- Mathilde Comont as Vannucci
- Rina De Liguoro as Nina (credited as Countess De Liguoro)

== Reception ==
Romance cost $496,000 and grossed $733,000 in the United States and $523,000 in other markets, the worldwide gross was $1,256,000, and it made a profit of $287,000.

Mordaunt Hall of The New York Times wrote that "Greta Garbo's performance in Romance is perhaps as good as anything she has done on the screen." Norbert Lusk of the movie magazine Picture Play wrote that Garbo's performance "is a thing of pure beauty, an inspiring blend of intellect and emotion, a tender, poignant, poetic portrait of a woman who thrusts love from her because she considers herself unworthy of the man who offers it."

== Accolades ==
Romance received two nominations at the 3rd Academy Awards: Best Director for Brown, and Best Actress for Garbo.
