= The Song of Songs (1933 film) =

1933 film by Rouben Mamoulian

- Theatrical release poster
- Directed by: Rouben Mamoulian
- Screenplay by: Leo Birinski and; Samuel Hoffenstein
- Based on: from the novel by Hermann Sudermann and the play by Edward Sheldon
- Starring: Marlene Dietrich; Brian Aherne; Lionel Atwill; Alison Skipworth
- Cinematography: Victor Milner
- Music by: Karl Hajos; Herman Hand; Bernhard Kaun; Milan Roder (all uncredited)
- Production company: Paramount Pictures
- Distributed by: Paramount Pictures
- Release date: July 19, 1933 (United States)
- Running time: 90 minutes
- Country: United States
- Language: English

The Song of Songs is a 1933 American pre-Code romantic drama film directed by Rouben Mamoulian and starring Marlene Dietrich. This Paramount picture is based on the Hermann Sudermann novel Das Hohe Lied (1908) and the play The Song of Songs (1914) by Edward Sheldon.

Song of Songs is a "romantic fable" with "tragic elements" in which an innocent peasant girl is transformed, step-by-step through the vicissitudes of love, into a disillusioned cynic. Most telling in this case is the use in German of the entire phrase to describe the "great song of love" or "ode to love" in Paul's First Epistle to the Corinthians. This creates a double layer of meaning to the title of the novel in German, one that could not be duplicated in an English rendition.

The 1914 play, The Song of Songs by Edward Sheldon, also contributed to this version. It is a remake of the 1918 silent film The Song of Songs starring Elsie Ferguson and the 1924 silent film Lily of the Dust with Pola Negri.

== Plot ==
An innocent peasant girl, Lily is bereft of family after the death of her elderly father. Her aunt, Mrs. Rasmussen who owns a bookshop, reluctantly takes in Lily, but treats her more as a servant than as a niece. The naturally affectionate girl attracts the attention of a local sculptor, Richard, who flirts with her and invites her to his atelier suggesting she pose for him. Lily demurs, but suffering under the scrutiny of her ill-willed aunt, she reconsiders and consents. In posing in the nude for Richard she discovers her womanhood, and incidentally, falls in love with the penurious artist. The artist finds himself ill-equipped to respond fully to Lily's overwhelming passion for him.

A suitor appears in the form of the wealthy Baron von Merzbach. A patron of Mrs. Rassmusen's book shop, he schemes to take Lily to his estate and make her his mistress, under the fiction that the mostly illiterate girl will serve as his secretary. The aunt accepts a cash bargain from the Baron, and casts her out. Lily flees to Robert's studio with the Baron in pursuit. To her dismay Richard hands her over to the Baron, believing she may be better off with a man who can provide for her. The Baron becomes infatuated with Lily and marries her, but expels her from his estate when, in despair, she attempts to seduce the Baron's riding master.

By chance, Richard encounters Lily, now working in a Berlin cabaret. She blames him for her degraded existence, but cynically praises him for disabusing her of her illusions, and allowing her to escape her naiveté and embrace the harsh realities of life. Remorsefully, Richard invites Lily to return to his studio. There she is confronted with the now completed marble statue she first posed for in her girlhood, an image of unspoiled innocence. In a calculated rage, she smashes the figure to pieces. After this catharsis, Lily and Richard reconcile and establish a genuine union.

== Cast ==
- Marlene Dietrich as Lily
- Brian Aherne as Richard Waldow
- Lionel Atwill as Baron von Merzbach
- Alison Skipworth as Mrs. Rasmussen
- Hardie Albright as Edward von Prell
- Helen Freeman as Miss von Schwertfeger

== Production ==
In the early 1930s, Paramount Pictures' premier female property was actress Marlene Dietrich. A genuine "screen goddess" of the Hollywood Golden Age, she rivaled Metro-Goldwyn-Mayer's Greta Garbo. Paramount director Josef von Sternberg had collaborated with Dietrich in five consecutive films and was instrumental in crafting her screen image. After their less than impressive Blonde Venus (1932), Paramount executives paired Dietrich with Mamoulian in Song of Songs.

Mamoulian, serving as both director and producer, assembled a talented crew, among them screenwriter Samuel Hoffenstein, art director Hans Dreier and cinematographer Victor Milner.

== Reception ==
New York Times reviewer A.D.S. bestows fulsome praise on the production. Though cautioning that The Song of Songs is "no dramatic bombshell", the visual elements are compared to Romantic poetry: "Mr. Mamoulian has the eye of a poet and his cameraman, Victor Milner, has the poet's skill". Indeed, the reviewer invokes Lord Byron's poem She Walks in Beauty (1814) to emphasize the point. Marlene Dietrich's outstanding portrayal of Lily in her devolution from innocent country girl to fallen "demimondaine" tends to obscure the "entirely excellent" supporting cast. The reviewer concludes that the play "could not have enjoyed a more satisfactory" cinematic treatment.

Rotten Tomatoes gives the film a score of 83% based on 6 interviews. (The New York Times' review is not among them.)

The film was a box office disappointment for Paramount.

== Censorship history ==
With the almost universal transition to sound movies in 1930, Paramount planned a remake of their 1924 silent feature Lily of the Dust (1924) starring Pola Negri. By July 1933, a scenario and script by Leo Birinski were prepared for The Song of Songs. Alerted that a remake was underway, the censors at the Hays Office, cautioned Paramount's production manager Jesse Lasky that the low "moral character" of the female protagonist in the silent film adaptation would not be tolerated in a sound version. Contrary to production code guidelines, Mamoulian and Paramount executives failed to submit a final shooting script for approval to the MPPDA, but forwarded a completed print of the film directly to the New York State Censorship Board, whose methods Paramount considered less draconian. Mamoulian personally appealed to the MPPDA administrators, and the film avoided wholesale cuts, - limited just to 1500 feet - before its 1933 release. In 1935, though "objectionable material" had been removed, The Song of Songs was denied reissue and "filed away for decades" as a film with a "social problem".
