= Romance (Sheldon play) =

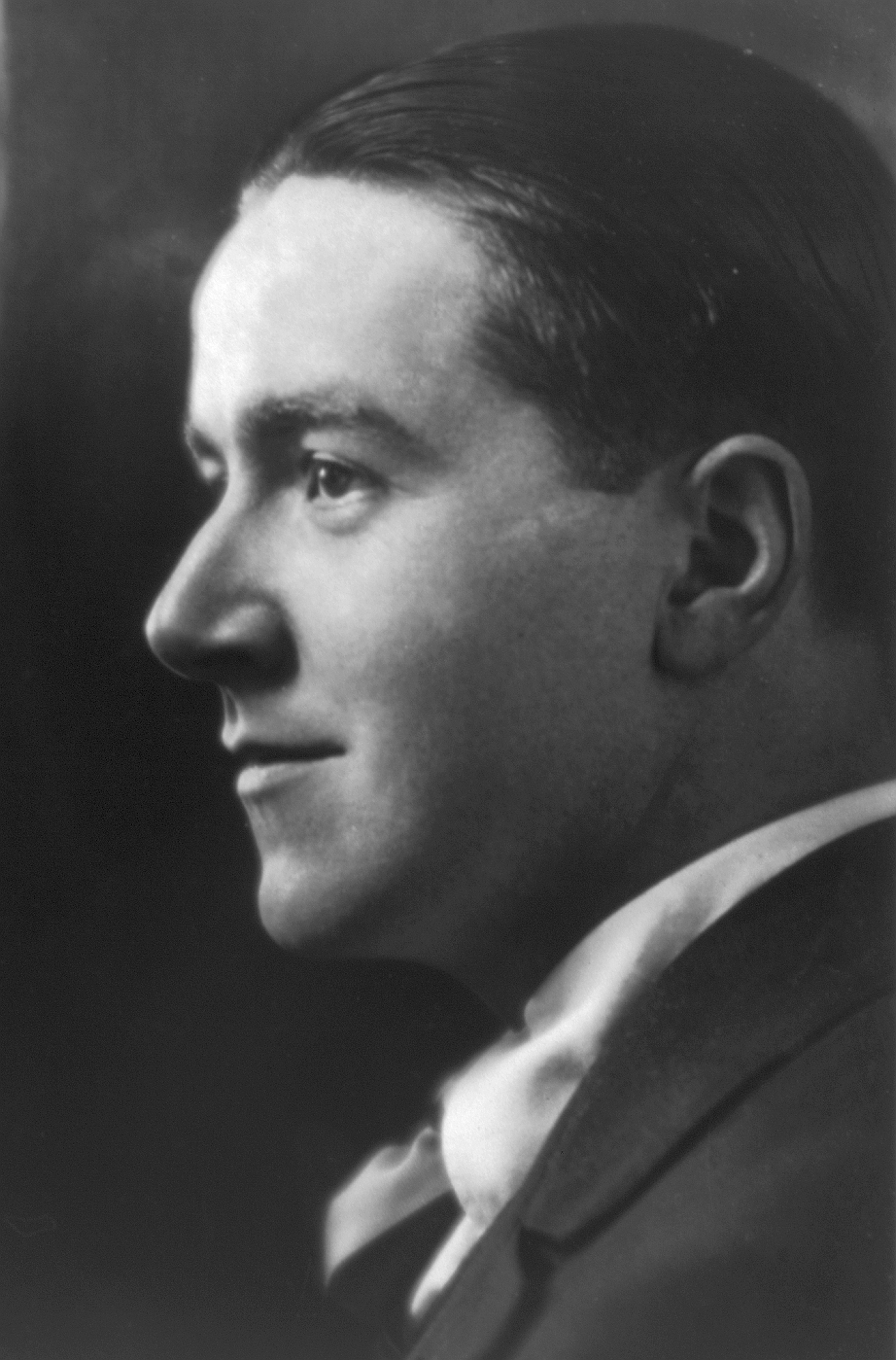
Edward Sheldon in 1914

Romance is a play by the American dramatist Edward Sheldon. It was first produced in New York in 1913, and a London production followed in 1915, which ran for 1,049 performances. Both productions featured Doris Keane as an opera star who has an intense affair with a young clergyman.

== Performance history ==
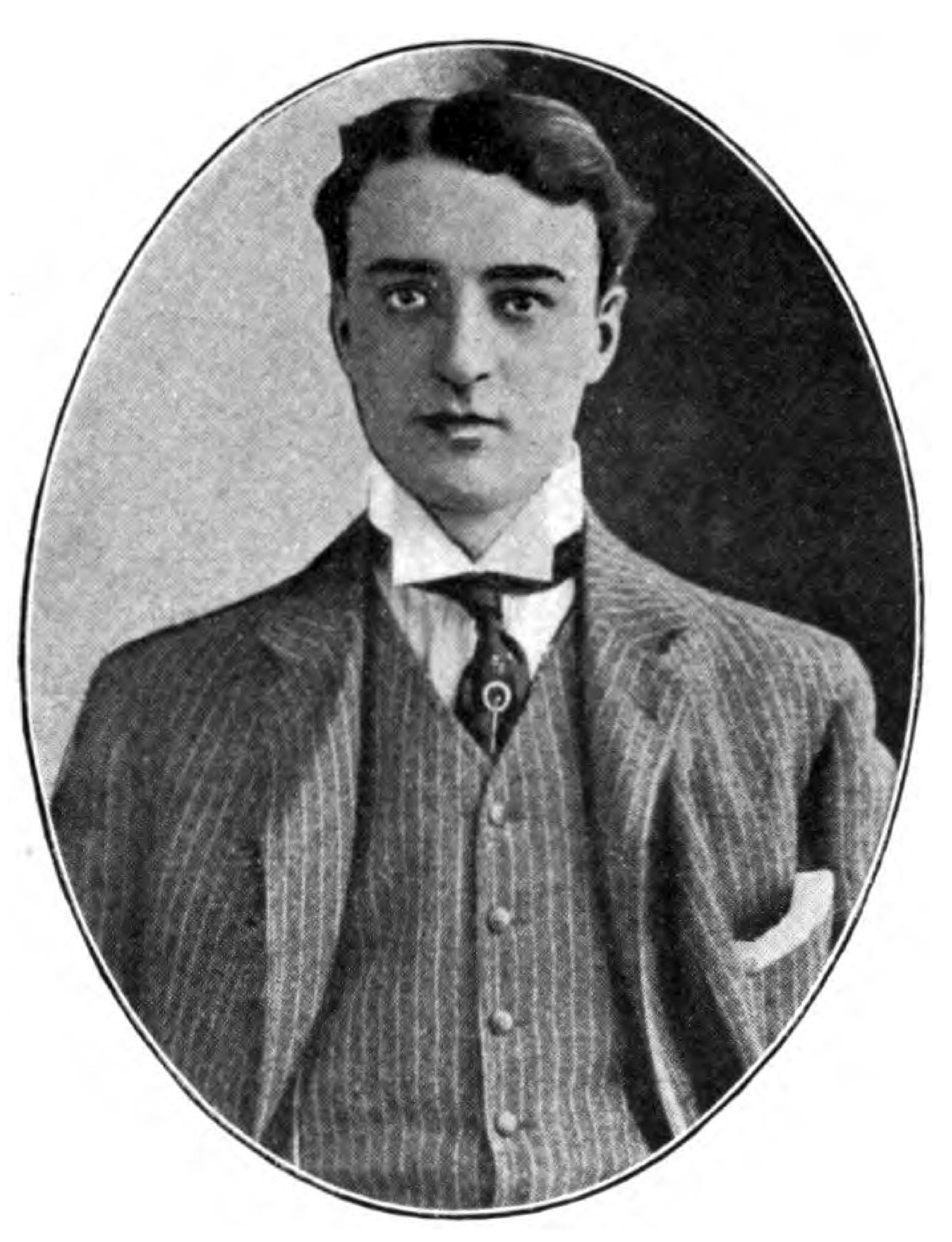
William Courtenay in 1909

The play opened at the Maxine Elliott Theatre, New York, on February 10, 1913. It featured Doris Keane as Mme Margherita Cavallini, William Courtenay as Thomas Armstrong and A. E. Anson as Cornelius van Tuyl. It ran for 160 performances.

In London, Romance opened at the Duke of York's Theatre on October 6, 1915. It featured Doris Keane as Mme Cavallini, Owen Nares as Armstrong and A. E. Anson, who produced the play, as van Tuyl. The play ran for 1,049 performances, transferring during the run to the Lyric Theatre.

The play was revived in 1921 at the Playhouse Theatre, New York, opening on February 28 and running for 106 performances. It featured Doris Keane as Mme Cavallini, Basil Sydney as Armstrong and A. E. Anson as van Tuyl.

== Synopsis ==
=== Prologue ===
In his library in Washington Square, New York, Bishop Armstrong learns with disquiet that his grandson Harry is engaged to be married to Lucille Anderson, an actress. Harry says that the bishop has never felt the way he does; in response, the bishop finds a box of mementos (a handkerchief and dried violets) from an affair of long ago, and starts to tell Harry a story. The following scenes are a representation of the story.

=== Act 1 ===
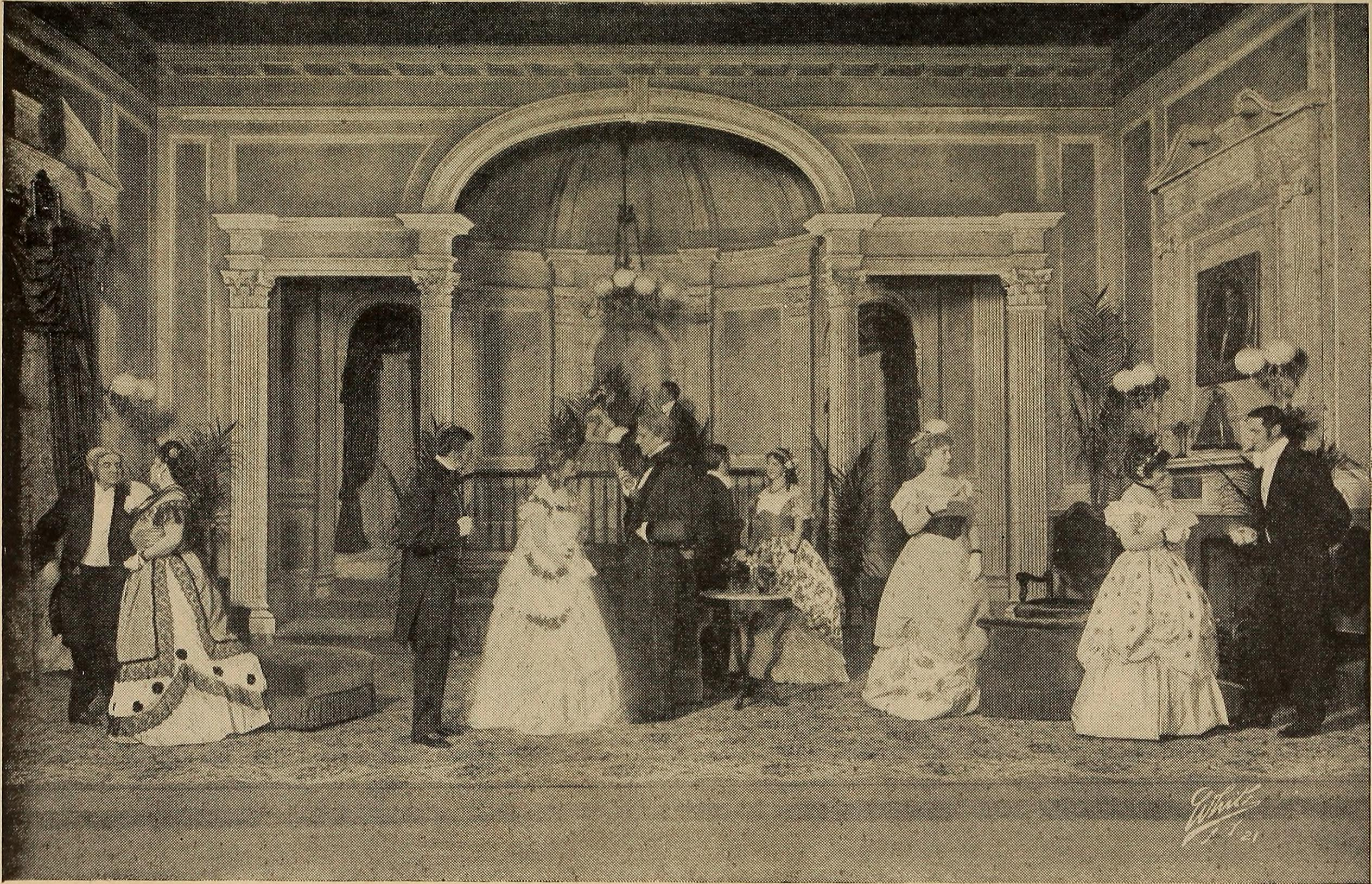
Scene from Romance. Maxine Elliott Theatre, 1913

About 1867, there is an evening reception at the house of Cornelius van Tuyl, a wealthy banker. The guests include Madame Margherita Cavallini, an Italian opera star. Tom, the rector of St Giles (the bishop in younger days) is a friend of van Tuyl, who supports his church work. Van Tuyl expects Tom to say he wants to marry his niece Susan; instead, Tom says he disapproves of his association with Mme Cavallini, who has a bad reputation.

When Mme Cavallini (Rita) enters with her admirers, she and Tom immediately notice each other. Tom awkwardly introduces himself to her, and she is interested in him. She says their moment together is like her bouquet of violets, to enjoy before they die. He wants to see her again, and she asks him to come to her hotel apartment. All this time he does not know who she is; as she leaves, she asks van Tuyl to tell him.

=== Act 2 ===
The scene is the study of St Giles' rectory, on the afternoon of New Year's Eve, a few weeks later. Miss Armstrong, Tom's aunt, is anxious about Tom's affair with Rita, and asks van Tuyl to "save him from that dreadful woman". When Rita arrives, van Tuyl tells her she is amusing herself at Tom's expense.

Tom arrives and the others go to tea; he talks to Rita. He says that love is finding the woman you want to live with all your life; she says it is like a little light in all the darkness. He asks her to marry him, but she says there is a reason she cannot. He tells her it will be all right if she repents of her sinful past. He is alarmed when he learns she had a relationship with van Tuyl, but she says it was not serious.

Tom announces to van Tuyl that they are engaged, and he congratulates them. But Rita says she was van Tuyl's mistress until she met Tom. Tom is appalled, and Rita leaves.

=== Act 3 ===
In her apartment later that evening, Rita is triumphant after her performance, and speaks from her balcony to the crowd below. Van Tuyl congratulates her. He tries to get her to eat the meal that has been prepared, but she is not hungry. She is going away the next day; he suggests that he goes away with her. She has a pistol, saying she will kill herself: that in the last weeks she has found something good in the world, but now cannot change.

Van Tuyl leaves by a back way as Tom arrives. Tom, seeing van Tuyl's card and two glasses, thinks they have had a passionate meeting. Tom passionately says he wants to save Rita from her sinful life, but then declares his love. Rita says she will kill herself if he touches her. Finally he hears the chimes of midnight and the church procession which he has organized; his manner changes and he leaves to join them.

=== Epilogue ===
The scene is as for the prologue; the bishop has finished his story. Harry, misunderstanding that the bishop's purpose was to sympathize with youthful impetuousness rather than encourage it, says he has been an ass to hesitate, and will marry Lucille. Harry's sister Suzette comes in; she sees in the paper an obituary of Mme Cavallini, and unaware of the connection with her grandfather, she reads it out; the opera singer never married.

== Critical reception ==
The critic Walter Prichard Eaton wrote about the original production:

This drama... achieves... a consistent and unfailing atmosphere, or perhaps it would be better to say mood. It is keyed to a certain emotional note, and it does not slump at any time into the merely sensational.

To be sure, some of the players, and more particularly one player, Mr. William Courteney, do their best to make it sensational, to drop it to quite another level.... Mr. Sheldon has here, it seems to us, come nearer to consistent, plausible, and really human characterization than in any work he has so far written.... They are real people, humanly felt, in "Romance", and they behave according to their natures.... Certainly the main story has coherence, charm, force and a real touch of romantic glamour, and it provides a very fine acting part for Miss Doris Keane....Cavallini is wayward, capricious, alternate smiles and moodiness.... So Miss Keane plays her, with a bewitching accent, with infectious fun, with delicious capriciousness, with true tenderness too....

In striking contrast to Mr. Courtenay's undisciplined exhibition is the acting of A. E. Anson as Van Tuyl, a gem of a performance.... Mr. Anson's complete command of the resources of his art is a treat to all lovers of acting, and his suave ease upon the stage a thing to be copied by many a player.

== Adaptations ==
- Romance (1913), a novel by Acton Davies (1870–1916).

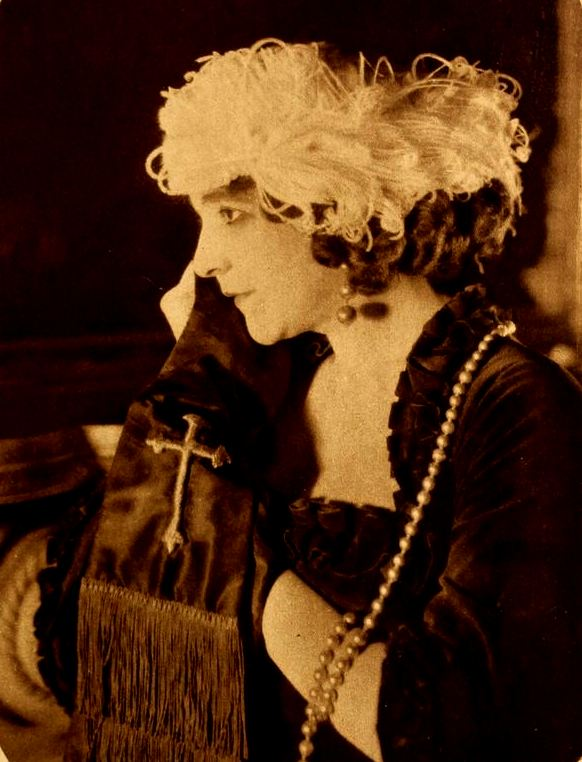
Doris Keane in the film Romance (1920)

- The 1920 film Romance, directed by Chester Withey: it featured Doris Keane as Mme Cavallini, Basil Sydney as Armstrong and Norman Trevor as van Tuyl.
- The 1930 film Romance, directed by Clarence Brown: it featured Greta Garbo as Mme Cavallini, Gavin Gordon as Armstrong and Lewis Stone as van Tuyl.
- The musical My Romance (1948): music by Sigmund Romberg, book and lyrics by Rowland Leigh, featuring Anne Jeffreys as Mme Cavallini and Lawrence Brooks as Armstrong. It opened on October 19, 1948 at the Shubert Theatre in New York, transferring during the run to the Adelphi Theatre and closing on January 8, 1949 (95 performances).
