= Forbidden Paradise =

1924 film by Ernst Lubitsch

- Theatrical poster
- Directed by: Ernst Lubitsch
- Written by: Agnes Christine Johnston; Hanns Kräly
- Based on: The Czarina by Edward Sheldon
- Produced by: Adolph Zukor; Jesse L. Lasky
- Starring: Pola Negri; Rod La Rocque; Adolphe Menjou; Pauline Starke
- Cinematography: Charles Van Enger
- Distributed by: Paramount Pictures
- Release date: November 30, 1924 (U.S.)
- Running time: 8 reels; 7,543 feet
- Country: United States
- Language: Silent (English intertitles)

Forbidden Paradise is a 1924 American silent drama film, directed by Ernst Lubitsch, produced by Famous Players–Lasky, and distributed by Paramount Pictures. The film is based on a 1922 Broadway play, The Czarina, by Edward Sheldon, who adapted the Hungarian-language book by Melchior Lengyel and Lajos Bíró. The play starred Doris Keane, in one of her last stage roles, as Catherine the Great. Basil Rathbone costarred with Keane. The film stars Pola Negri as Catherine the Great and Rod La Rocque in the Rathbone role. Clark Gable makes his second appearance on film.

== Plot ==
As described in a review in a film magazine, Catherine, the Czarina of a small European country, decides to give audience in person to the French Ambassador when she learns he is a favorite with the Parisian ladies. In the meantime, Alexei, a young officer in a border town discovers a revolution is in progress and hurries to the palace, forcing an entrance into the Czarina's presence. So impressed is she that she forgets the revolution and the Ambassador and bestows her favor on Alexei, who finds himself a popular favorite and is made captain of the royal guard. Alexei neglects his fiancé Anna, one of the queen's ladies-in-waiting. At a banquet he discovers four other officers wearing the insignia of the queen's favor and, when he reproaches her, she chides him to avoid scandal. Disillusioned, he joins the revolution and tells the queen she is under arrest. The Chamberlain has bought off the leaders and Alexei is court-martialed and sentenced to death. The Czarina, unable to win him back, graciously pardons him even knowing that he will marry Anna. The French Ambassador is ushered in and soon reappears wearing one of the telltale decorations.

== Cast ==
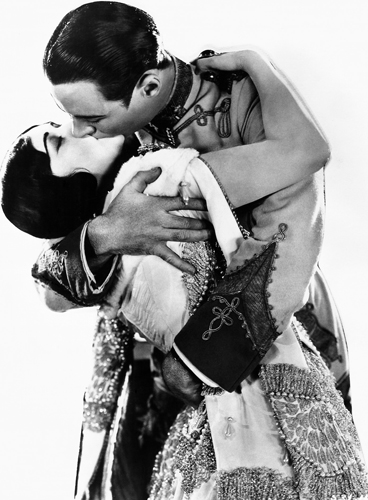
Pola Negri and Rod La Rocque

- Pola Negri as Catherine (the Czarina)
- Rod La Rocque as Capt. Alexei Czerny
- Adolphe Menjou as Chancellor
- Pauline Starke as Anna
- Fred Malatesta as French ambassador
- Nick De Ruiz as The General
- Carrie Daumery as Lady-in-Waiting
- Clark Gable as Soldier in Czarina's guard (uncredited)
- Carlton Griffin as Officer (uncredited)
- William Quinn (uncredited)
- Leo White as Driver (uncredited)

== Preservation ==
Complete prints of Forbidden Paradise are located in the George Eastman Museum Motion Picture Collection, Museum of Modern Art, Cinematek, and EYE Film Institute Netherlands.

== See also ==
- The House That Shadows Built (1931 promotional film by Paramount)
