= The Song of Songs (novel) =

1908 novel by Hermann Sudermann

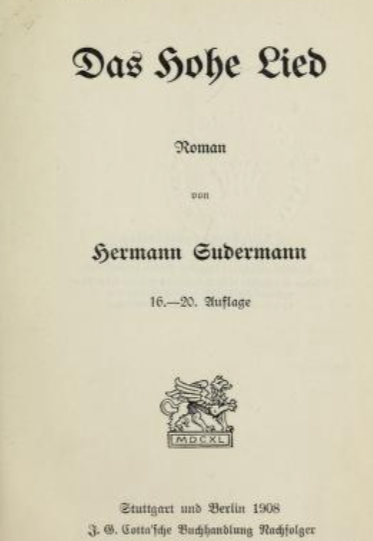
- Title page for original German language, Das hohe Lied (1908)
- Author: Hermann Sudermann
- Original title: Das hohe Lied
- Translator: Thomas Seltzer
- Language: German
- Publisher: J.G. Cotta
- Publication date: 1908
- Publication place: Germany
- English publication date: 1909
- Pages: 635

The Song of Songs (German: Das hohe Lied) is a 1908 novel by the German writer Hermann Sudermann. It was published in English in 1909, translated by Thomas Seltzer. A new translation by Beatrice Marshall was published in 1913.

== Adaptations ==
- 1914: The Song of Songs, play by Edward Sheldon
- 1918: The Song of Songs, film directed by Joseph Kaufman
- 1924: Lily of the Dust, film directed by Dimitri Buchowetzki
- 1933: The Song of Songs, film directed by Rouben Mamoulian
- 1973: The Song of Songs, BBC Television mini-series (with Penelope Wilton as Lily)
