= Varesi =

Varesi is a surname. Notable people with the surname include:

- Fabian Varesi, Italian musician
- Felice Varesi (1813–1889), French-born Italian opera singer
- Gilda Varesi (1887–1965), Italian-born actress and playwright
- Valerio Varesi, Italian author
