= Gilda Varesi =

American dramatist

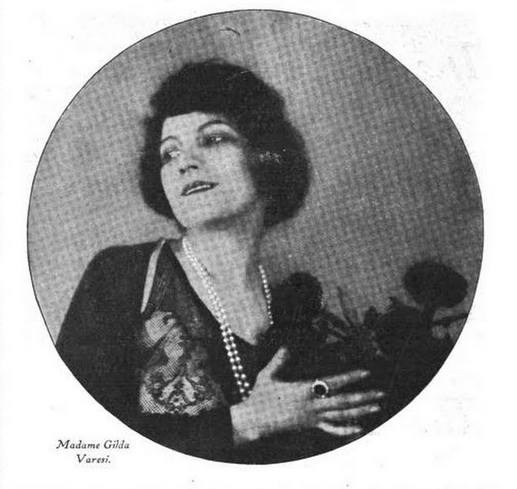
Gilda Varesi, from a 1921 publication.

Gilda Varesi (September 28, 1887 – May 27, 1965), also known as Gilda Varesi Archibald, was an Italian-born actress and playwright.

== Early life ==
Gilda Varesi was born in Milan, and adopted as the daughter of opera singer Elena Boccabadati Varesi. Her maternal grandparents Felice Varesi and Cecilia Boccabadati Gazzudo were also opera singers. Luigia Boccabadati was Gilda's great-grandmother. Gilda Varesi, who was named for a character in Verdi's Rigoletto, moved to Chicago as a child, with her family.

== Career ==
Varesi started on stage in Chicago, with the Ben Greet Players, before joining Helena Modjeska's troupe, then working with Minnie Maddern Fiske in Salvation Nell (1908) and Little Italy. She toured as the lead in War Brides in 1915. She covered John Barrymore's role for ten performances of The Jest when he was ill in 1920. She recalled her days as an understudy in her later work, saying, "No one ever lost a position by giving a lift to someone else. Remembering how helpful understudying was to me, I always try to give my own understudy at least one chance to appear publicly."

Varesi co-wrote (with Dolly Byrne) and starred in Enter Madame, a comedy about an opera singer based on her mother, who died months before the show opened on Broadway in 1920. Based on this performance, critic Maude Sperry Turner called Varesi, "the most gifted actress on Broadway," and Alexander Woollcott declared her "a first-rate actress, with a distinct tragic power and an inborn capacity to send chills up and down your spine."

Enter Madame was adapted for the screen twice, as a silent film in 1922, starring Clara Kimball Young and Elliott Dexter, and as a sound picture in 1935, with Cary Grant and Elissa Landi. It was also included in The Best Plays of 1920-1921 (1921).

She appeared in two silent films, The Man of Mystery (1917) and Romance (1920, now lost).

== Personal life ==
Gilda Varesi was introduced to English lawyer John Gordon Archibald by actress Doris Keane and playwright Alfred Sutro in London. They married in 1922. She died in 1965, aged 77 years, in London.
