= Sheldon v. Metro-Goldwyn Pictures Corp. =

- Supreme Court of the United States

Argued February 8–9, 1940 Decided March 25, 1940
- Full case name: Sheldon v. Metro-Goldwyn Pictures Corp.
- Citations: 309 U.S. 390 (more) 60 S. Ct. 681; 84 L. Ed. 825

Holding
- In the case of an unauthorized adaptation, courts may elect to award only a portion of an infringer's profits to the plaintiff. The proportion that the defendant is entitled to keep is in proportion to the amount of original creative work went into the adaptation, and the court may be assisted in determining that by expert witness testimony.

Court membership
- Chief Justice Charles E. Hughes Associate Justices James C. McReynolds · Harlan F. Stone; Owen Roberts · Hugo Black; Stanley F. Reed · Felix Frankfurter; William O. Douglas · Frank Murphy

Case opinion
- Majority: Hughes, joined by unanimous
- McReynolds took no part in the consideration or decision of the case.

Sheldon v. Metro-Goldwyn Pictures Corp., 309 U.S. 390 (1940), was a United States Supreme Court case in which the Court held, in the case of an unauthorized adaptation, courts may elect to award only a portion of an infringer's profits to the plaintiff. The proportion that the defendant is entitled to keep is in proportion to the amount of original creative work that went into the adaptation, and the court may be assisted in determining that by expert witness testimony. The Court found that awarding more to the plaintiff "would be to inflict an unauthorized penalty."

The case involved Metro-Goldwyn using material from the 1930 play Dishonored Lady by Edward Sheldon and Margaret Ayer Barnes for the 1932 film Letty Lynton. It was brought before various courts before ending up with the Supreme Court, which awarded one fifth of the profits.
