= Edward Sheldon =

American dramatist (1886–1946)

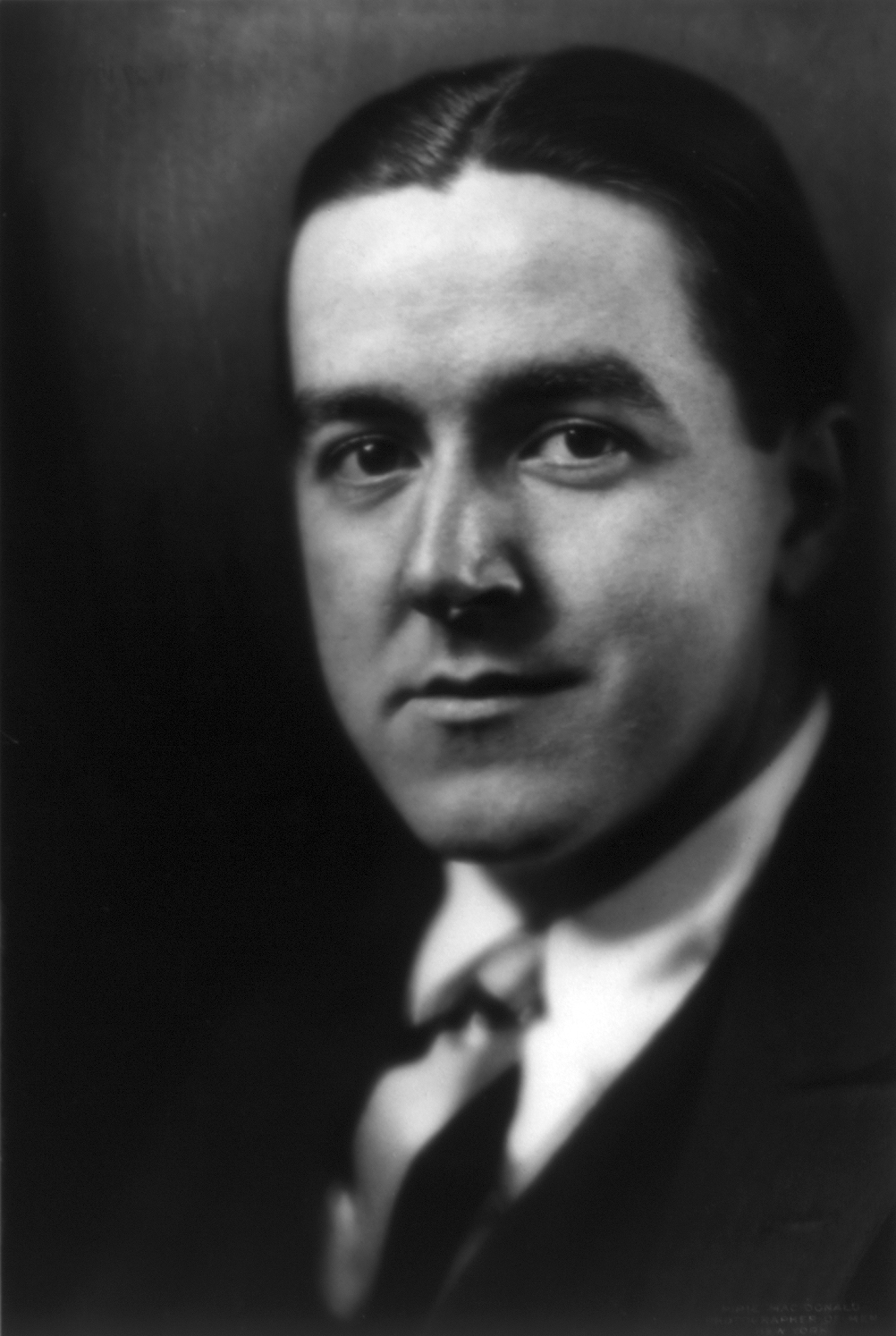
- Edward Sheldon in 1914
- Born: February 4, 1886; Chicago, Illinois, U.S.
- Died: April 1, 1946 (aged 60) (lymphatic cancer); New York City, New York, U.S.
- Education: Harvard College
- Occupation: playwright

Edward Brewster Sheldon (February 4, 1886, in Chicago, Illinois – April 1, 1946, in New York City) was an American dramatist. His plays include Salvation Nell (1908) and Romance (1913), which was made into a motion picture with Greta Garbo.

After becoming ill at age 29 with crippling rheumatoid arthritis, which eventually claimed his sight (around 1930), Sheldon became a source of emotional and creative support for his many friends, notably Minnie Maddern Fiske (he wrote Salvation Nell for her), Julia Marlowe, John Barrymore (his closest friend and confidante), Thornton Wilder, Alexander Woollcott, Anne Morrow Lindbergh, Ruth Gordon, and Helen Hayes. While in hospital his advice was received by those in the theatrical profession as gospel. Actress and librettist Dorothy Donnelly formed a close friendship with Sheldon, and after he became bedridden often assisted with transcribing, editing, and supporting his work.

In May 1915 Sheldon narrowly missed sailing on the Lusitania's infamous last voyage. He had been asked by theater impresario Charles Frohman to accompany him to England. A Harvard classmate of Sheldon's was getting married on May 11 and asked Sheldon to be best man. Sheldon then declined Frohman's offer.

A 1936 lawsuit against Metro-Goldwyn-Mayer for copyright infringement claimed that the script MGM used for the 1932 motion picture Letty Lynton plagiarized material from the play Dishonored Lady by Sheldon and Margaret Ayer Barnes. After being heard before various courts, the case ended up before the Supreme Court of the United States as Sheldon v. Metro-Goldwyn Pictures Corp.; in 1940 the Supreme Court awarded a fifth of the profits. The film is still unavailable today because of this lawsuit.

His life is detailed in The Man Who Lived Twice by Eric Wollencott Barnes. In this biography Barnes states that Sheldon was in love all his adult life with Doris Keane, the actress who starred in Romance in 1913.

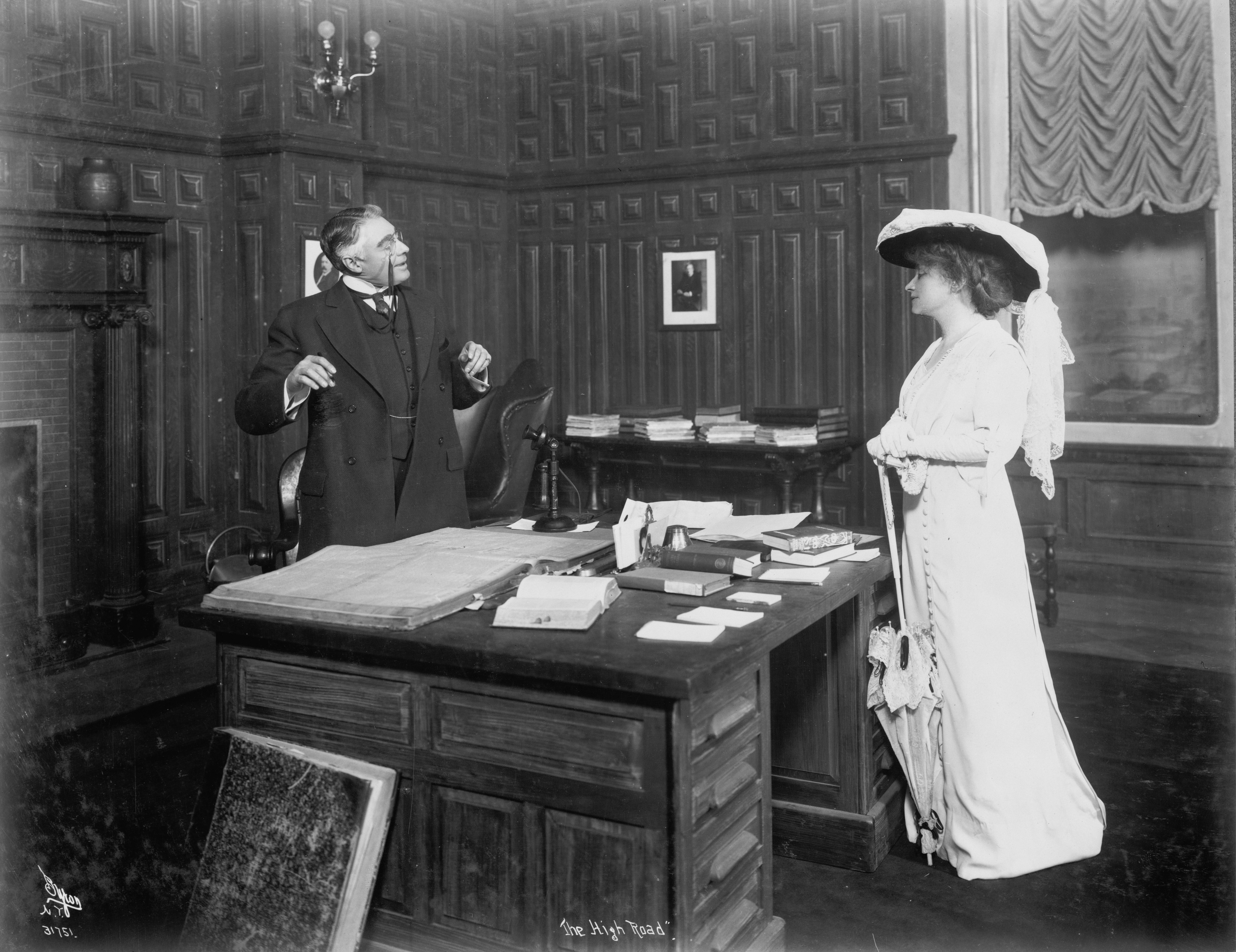
Minnie Maddern Fiske and Frederick Perry in The High Road (1912)

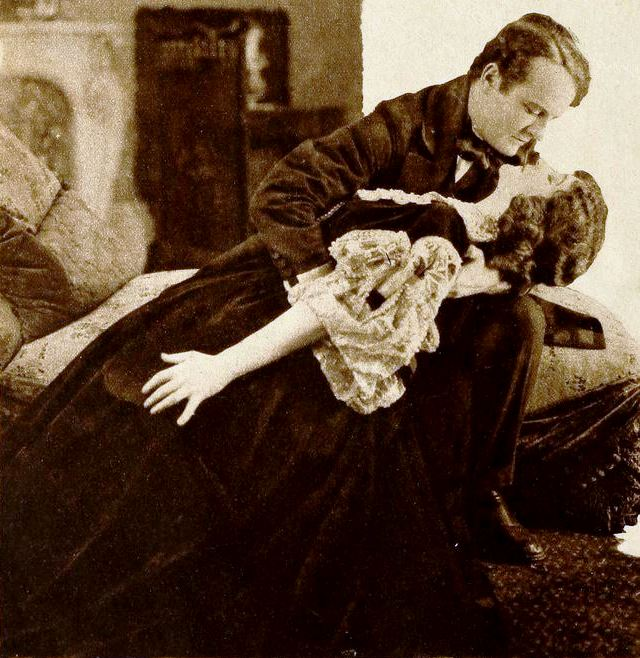
Basil Sydney and Doris Keane in the film Romance (1920)

== Plays ==
- Salvation Nell (1908), made into the 1915, 1921, and 1931 motion pictures of the same name
- The Nigger (1909), made into the 1915 motion picture of the same name (aka The New Governor or The Mystery of Morrow's Rest) produced by William Fox
- The Boss (1911), made into the 1915 motion picture of the same name
- The High Road (1912), made into the 1915 motion picture of the same name
- Romance (1913), notable for its London run of 1,049 performances. Made into a 1920 silent film by United Artists starring Doris Keane, the actress who appeared in the role on stage. Also made into a 1930 motion picture starring Greta Garbo. Produced in New York as a musical, My Romance, with music by Sigmund Romberg and book and lyrics by Rowland Leigh, in 1948.
- The Song of Songs (1914), dramatization of the novel by Hermann Sudermann, made into films in 1918 (The Song of Songs), 1924 (Lily of the Dust), and in 1933 (The Song of Songs, starring Marlene Dietrich, Brian Aherne, and Lionel Atwill)
- The Garden of Paradise (1914), from "The Little Mermaid" by Hans Christian Andersen
- The Call of Her People (1916), a silent film for Ethel Barrymore, from Sheldon's own play Egypt.
- The Jest (1919), adaptation from the Italian of Sem Benelli
- The Czarina (1922), adaptation of the Hungarian play by Melchior Lengyel and Lajos Bíró, made into the 1924 silent Forbidden Paradise with Pola Negri.
- Bewitched (1924), with Sidney Howard
- Lulu Belle (1926), with Charles MacArthur, starring Lenore Ulric; made into the 1948 motion picture of the same name, starring Dorothy Lamour
- My Princess (1927), with Luis Alberni
- Jenny (1929), with Margaret Ayer Barnes
- Dishonored Lady (1930), with Barnes, made into the 1947 motion picture of the same name, starring Hedy Lamarr and directed by Robert Stevenson (alternate title Sins of Madeleine)
