= Eric Wollencott Barnes =

American educator, diplomat, actor, and author

- Born: May 7, 1907; Little Rock, Arkansas, U.S.
- Died: December 31, 1962 (aged 55); Boston, Massachusetts, U.S.
- Occupation: Writer
- Writing career
- Period: 20th century
- Genres: History, fiction

(Frank) Eric Wollencott Barnes (May 7, 1907 – December 31, 1962) was an American educator, diplomat, actor, and writer.

== Education ==
Barnes attended public schools in Little Rock, Arkansas. He entered UCLA in 1925, and in 1926 transferred to L'École des Sciences Politiques in Paris, where he graduated in 1930. He received a diplome d'études superieures from the University of Paris in 1931, followed by a fellowship at the Sorbonne, then obtained a teaching post at the University of Paris in 1932.

In 1940 Barnes received a Doctor of Letters degree from the University of Paris.

== Career ==
In 1930 Barnes enlisted in the United States Foreign Service, and was appointed Vice Consul at Bucharest, Romania, and then in Sofia, Bulgaria. Returning to the U.S. in the mid-1930s he pursued an acting career in New York, where he appeared in several plays under the stage name Eric Wollencott.

In 1938 he took a position at Russell Sage College in Troy, New York, where he quickly rose to become an associate professor and chair of the English department. He became a full professor in 1945.

During World War II Barnes served as a civilian consultant to the Joint Chiefs of Staff and as a military information officer with the O.S.S. in Algiers.

After the war (September 1946) Barnes took a position at Dickinson College, as the Thomas Beaver Professor of English Literature and chair of the department.

Barnes left Dickinson officially in 1953 to head the Institution of American Studies at the Free University of Berlin, where he had been since 1951. He remained in Berlin until 1957, whereupon he returned to the U.S. to teach at the Loomis School in Windsor, Connecticut. He was the author of many academic works in both French and English, including a series of histories for grade-school students.

== Works ==
- Lady of Fashion: The Life and the Theatre of Anna Cora Mowatt (1954), biography of the Victorian actress and playwright
- The Man Who Lived Twice (1956), biography of Edward Sheldon, playwright
- The War Between the States (1959)
- Free Men Must Stand: The American War of Independence (1962)
- Free Men Must Stand: The War That Made a Nation (1964)

== Personal ==
On March 29, 1941, Barnes married Margaret Ingalls Marvin. They had two children, both boys: Eric Marvin Barnes (1942–1967) and Charles Taylor Barnes (1946–). He died in Boston on the final day of 1962.
