= Enter Madame (play) =

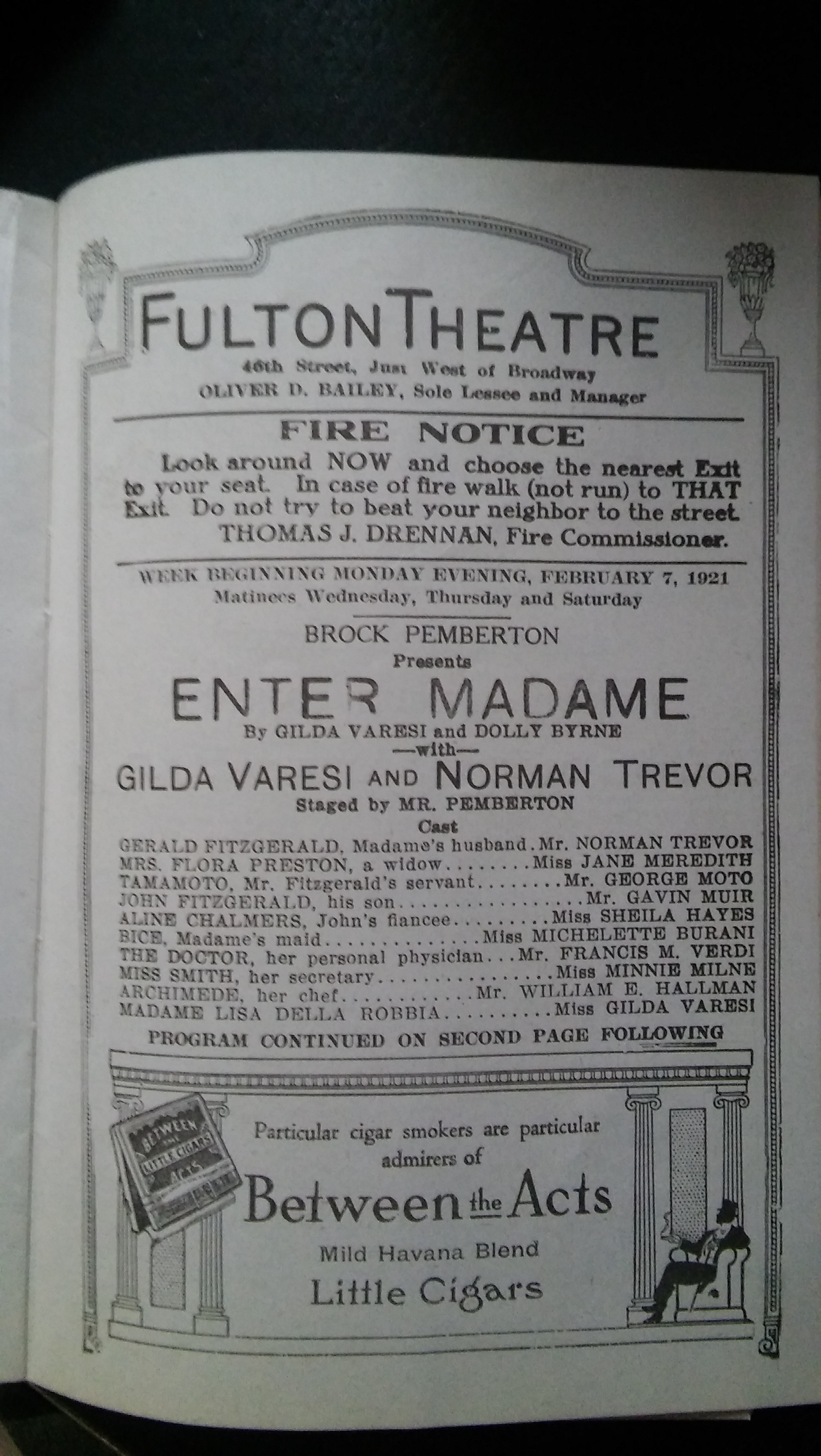
- Written by: Gilda Varesi and Dolly Byrne
- Original language: English
- Genre: Comedy
- Setting: Mr. Fitzgerald's apartment living room

Premiere
- Date premiered: August 16, 1920
- Place premiered: Garrick Theatre; New York City, New York

Enter Madame was a 1920 Broadway three-act comedy written by Gilda Varesi and Dolly Byrne, produced and directed by Brock Pemberton. Varesi also played the lead role of opera singer Madame Lisa Della Robia with Norman Trevor playing her husband Gerald Fitzgerald. It ran a total of 350 performances from August 16, 1920 to October 2, 1920 at the Garrick Theatre, from October 4, 1920 - May 21, 1921 at the Fulton Theatre, then May 23, 1921 - April 1922 at Theatre Republic. It was included in Burns Mantle's The Best Plays of 1920-1921.

It was adapted into two films of the same name Enter Madame(1922) and the 1935 remake starring Cary Grant.

== Cast ==
- Gilda Varesi as Madame Lisa Della Robia
- Norman Trevor as Gerald Fitzgerald
- Gavin Muir as John Fitzgerald
- Michellette Baroni as Bice
- William Hallman as Archimede
- Sheila Hayes as Aline Chalmers
- Jane Meredith as Mrs. Flora Preston
- Minnie Milne as Miss Smith
- George Moto as Tamamoto
- Francis M. Verdi as the doctor
