= Romance (1920 film) =

1920 American silent film by Chester Withey

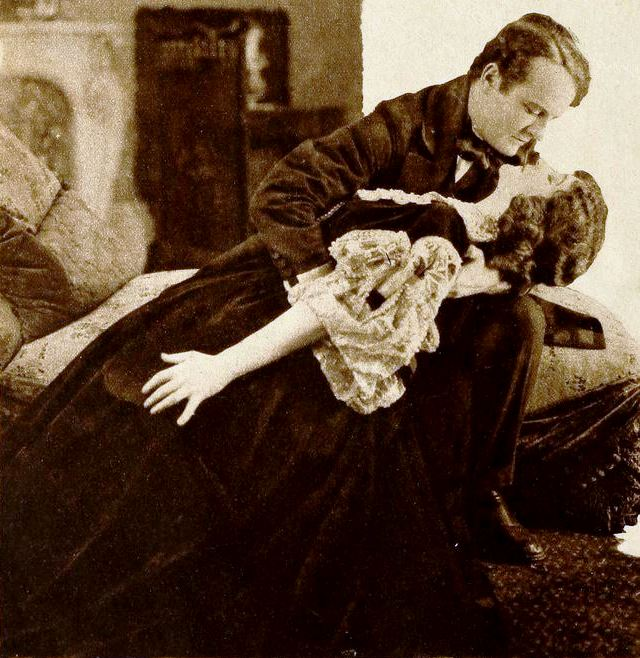
- Film still with Sydney and Keane
- Directed by: Chester Withey
- Written by: Wells Hastings (scenario)
- Based on: Romance; 1913 play by Edward Sheldon
- Produced by: D.W. Griffith
- Starring: Doris Keane; Basil Sydney
- Cinematography: Louis Bitzer
- Distributed by: United Artists
- Release date: May 30, 1920
- Running time: 70 minutes (7 reels)
- Country: United States
- Language: Silent (English intertitles)

Romance is a 1920 American silent drama film directed by Chester Withey and released through United Artists. The film is based on the 1913 play Romance by Edward Sheldon and stars Doris Keane, the actress who created the role in the play. This was Miss Keane's only motion picture. D. W. Griffith allowed the use of his Mamaroneck Studios for the production. The nephew of Griffith's favorite cameraman, Billy Bitzer, was the cinematographer. The story was later remade as Romance in 1930, an early talking vehicle for Greta Garbo.

No copies of Romance are known to survive making it a lost film.

== Plot ==
As described in a film publication, a youth (Arthur Rankin) in the prologue seeks advice from his grandfather (Sydney), who then recalls a romance of his own youth which is then shown as a flashback. A priest (Sydney) is in love with an Italian opera singer (Keane), and the drama involves the conflict between his efforts to rise above worldly things or to leave with her. The romance ends with a deep note of pathos.

== Cast ==
- Doris Keane as Madame Cavallini
- Basil Sydney as Bishop Armstrong / Bishop's nephew
- Norman Trevor as Cornelius Van Tuyl
- Betty Ross Clarke as Susan Van Tuyl
- Amelia Summerville as Miss Armstrong
- A.J. Herbert as Mr. Livingston
- Gilda Varesi as Vanucci (credited as Gilda Varesi Archibald)
- John Davidson as Beppo
- June Ellen Terry as Suzette Armstrong
- Arthur Rankin as Harry Armstrong
- Vangie Valentine as Marion Ward

== Production ==
The movie was based on a hit play and was financed by fledgling United Artists. $150,000 was spent on the story and Doris Keane's salary. It went $100,000 over budget and recorded a loss of $80,000.
