= The Song of Songs (1918 film) =

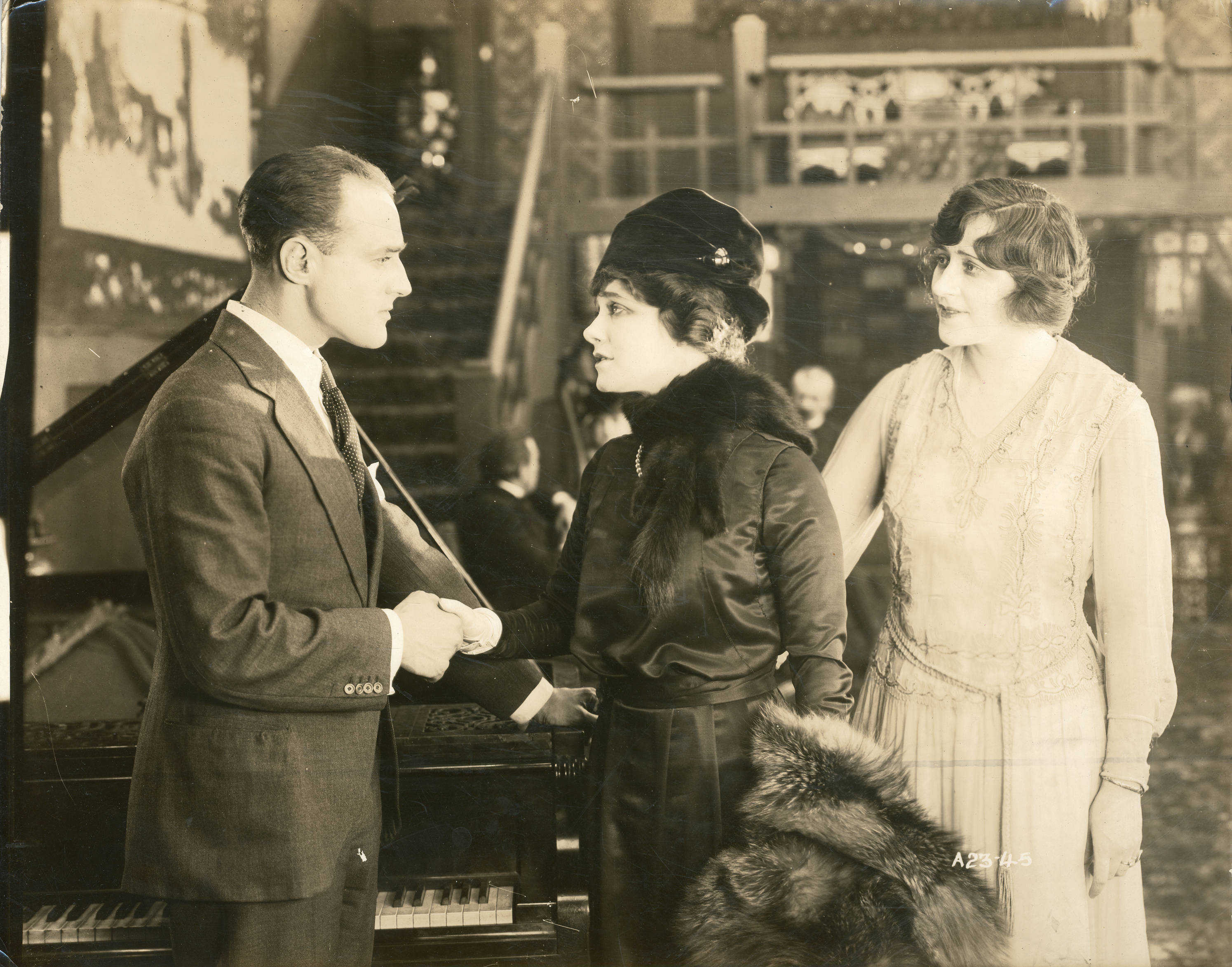
- Film still
- Directed by: Joseph Kaufman
- Written by: Charles Maigne (scenario)
- Based on: novel Das hohe Lied by Hermann Sudermann and play The Song of Songs by Edward Sheldon
- Produced by: Adolph Zukor; Jesse L. Lasky
- Starring: Elsie Ferguson
- Cinematography: William Marshall
- Production company: Famous Players–Lasky / Artcraft
- Distributed by: Paramount Pictures
- Release date: February 18, 1918
- Running time: 5 reels
- Country: United States
- Language: Silent (English intertitles)

The Song of Songs is a 1918 American silent drama film produced by Famous Players–Lasky and based on a 1914 stage play version by Edward Sheldon of the 1908 novel by Hermann Sudermann, The Song of Songs. This picture was directed by Joseph Kaufman and stars Elsie Ferguson. This was Kaufman's last film before his death on February 1, 1918, very early on during the 1918 flu pandemic.

This film is now considered a lost film.

The story was remade as Lily of the Dust (1924) with Pola Negri and Ben Lyon. Marlene Dietrich starred in the first sound version The Song of Songs (1933).

== Plot summary ==
Lily, an innocent young girl, is convinced to pose nude for a young sculptor. They fall in love, but the sculptor fears the effect of marriage on his work and neglects Lily. Ultimately, in despair, she marries a wealthy older man but does not find happiness there. Only near-tragedy and scandal are able, ironically, to bring her that happiness.

== Cast ==
- Elsie Ferguson as Lily Kardos
- Frank Losee as Senator Calkins
- Crauford Kent as Dick Laird
- Cecil Fletcher as Stephen Bennett
- Gertrude Berkeley as Mrs. Kardos
- Corene Uzzell as Ann Merkle (credited as Corinne Usell)
- Charles Wellesley as Mrs. Atwell
- Henry Leone as Anslem Kardos
- Robert Cummings as Phineas Bennett
- Ned Burton (unknown role)

== Reception ==
Like many American films of the time, The Song of Songs was subject to cuts and restrictions by city and state film censorship boards. For example, the Chicago Board of Censors issued the film an Adults Only permit.
