= The Song of Songs (play) =

Play by Edward Sheldon

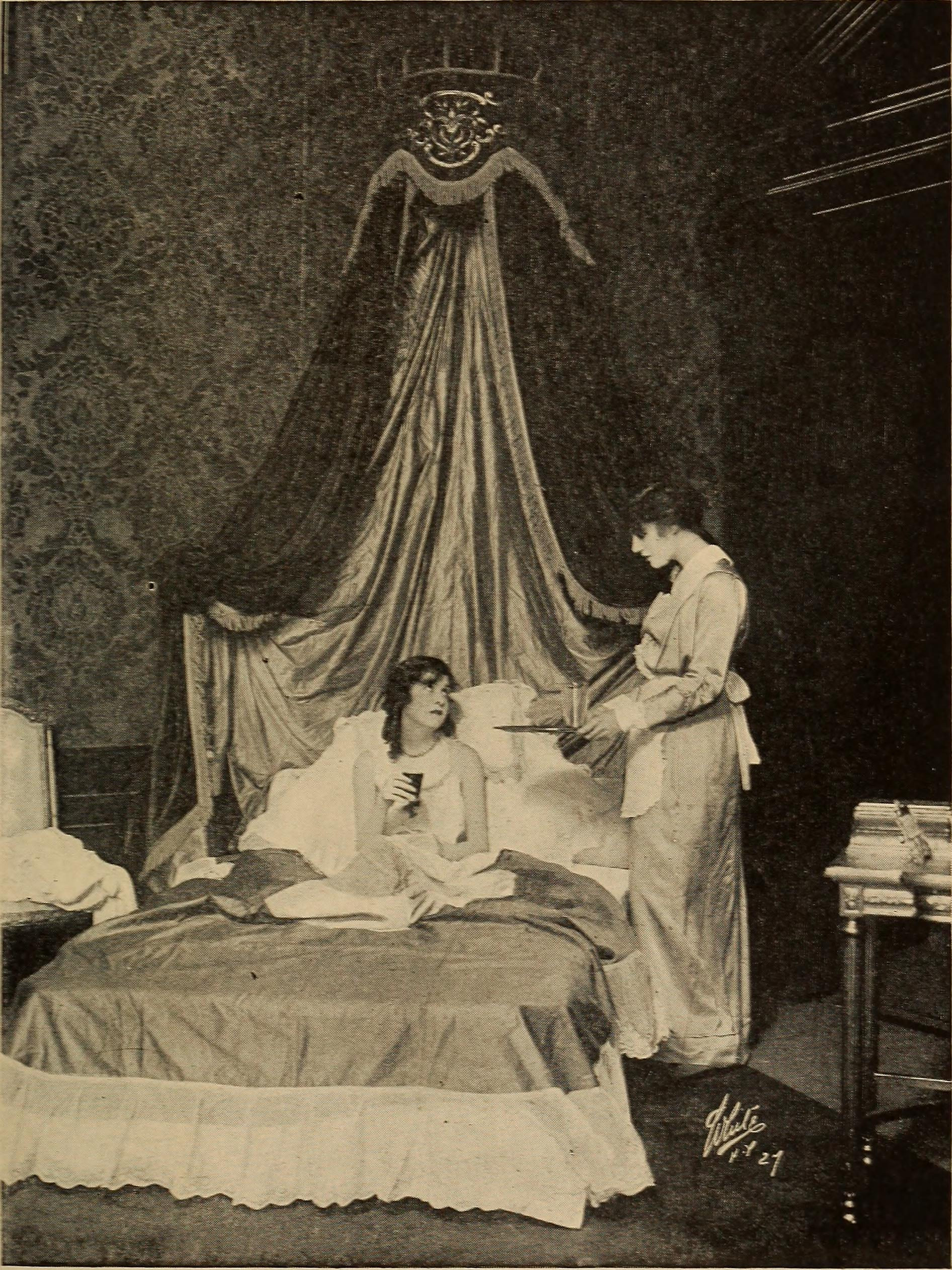
- Stage photograph of The Song of Songs (1914)
- Original language: English
- Written by: Edward Sheldon
- Based on: The Song of Songs by Hermann Sudermann
- Genre: Drama

Premiere
- Date: December 22, 1914
- Place: Eltinge Theatre

The Song of Songs is a 1914 play written by Edward Sheldon, based on the 1908 German novel The Song of Songs by Hermann Sudermann, which had been translated to English under the title The Song of Songs. Producer A. H. Woods staged the play on Broadway at his Eltinge 42nd Street Theatre, where it was a box office success. The play was the basis of several movie and radio adaptations.

== Plot ==
Shop girl Lily Kardos marries Senator Calkins, but secretly continues to see her ex-lover Richard Laird on the side. Calkins abandons Lily when he discovers her infidelity. Lily then begins a relationship with Stephen Bennett. Stephen's uncle Phineas, aware of Lily's reputation, gets her drunk at a party to reveal the truth about her to Stephen. Her inappropriate behavior causes Stephen to break up with her. In the final act, she returns to Richard Laird.

== Cast and characters ==
The characters and cast from the Broadway production are given below:

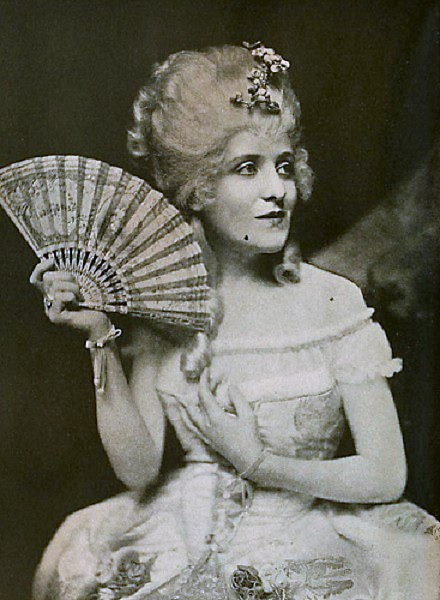
Irene Fenwick starred as Lily Kardos in the Broadway production.

Cast of the Broadway production
Character	Broadway cast
Ruby Purcell	Maud Allan
A Drummer	William Stone
A Customer	Eleanor Seybolt
Della Shay	Helena Rapport
Lily Kardos	Irene Fenwick
A Detroit Chap	Forrest Winant
A Messenger Boy	John Coss
Richard Laird	Cyril Keightley
Senator Daniel E. Calkins	John Mason
Anna Merklee	Dorothy Donnelly
Wilkins	H. C. Lewis
Jane	Josephine Robbins
Marcel	Francis M. Verdt
Lindsey McAlpin	James Lounsberry
Judge Atwell	R. A. Brandon
Stephen Bennett	Ernest Glendinning
Achille	A. Romaine Callender
Maurice	Claus Bogel
Phineas K. Bennett	Thomas A. Wise
Louise	Beatrice Clevenger
Emma	Grace Wall

== Reception ==
The play received a mixed reception from critics. The New York Times said the Broadway production was well-acted and "deeply interesting", but was also too long, flawed, and generally inferior to the novel. The Brooklyn Daily Eagle also complimented the acting, but said the play's primary draw was "sensationalism" that would "attract the mentally depraved".

The drama critic for Life magazine said the play served only to "pique depraved curiosity". Drama critic Walter Prichard Eaton said Sheldon made a critical error in moving the location of the story from Europe to America, thereby making some of the characters' actions less plausible.

== Adaptations ==
In 1918, Famous Players–Lasky produced a silent film adaptation of The Song of Songs, directed by Joseph Kaufman and starring Elsie Ferguson. This movie is now considered a lost film. In 1924, the same studio remade the story under the title Lily of the Dust, directed by Dimitri Buchowetzki and starring Pola Negri. This film is also lost.

In 1933, Paramount Pictures (the successor of Famous Players–Lasky) made a sound version of The Song of Songs, directed by Rouben Mamoulian and starring Marlene Dietrich. On December 20, 1937, Dietrich reprised her role in a radio play presented by the Lux Radio Theatre on the CBS Radio Network.
