= Black Beauty (1933 film) =

1933 film

- Directed by: Phil Rosen
- Written by: Anna Sewell (novel); Charles A. Logue
- Produced by: I.E. Chadwick; Trem Carr
- Starring: Esther Ralston; Alexander Kirkland; Gavin Gordon
- Cinematography: Charles J. Stumar
- Edited by: Carl Pierson
- Production company: Chadwick Pictures
- Distributed by: Monogram Pictures
- Release date: April 1, 1933
- Running time: 70 minutes
- Country: United States
- Language: English

Black Beauty is a 1933 American pre-Code drama film directed by Phil Rosen and starring Esther Ralston, Alexander Kirkland and Gavin Gordon. It is one of a number of adaptations of Anna Sewell's 1877 novel Black Beauty, with the setting moved from Victorian Britain to a plantation in Virginia.

== Cast ==
- Esther Ralston as Leila Lambert
- Alexander Kirkland as Henry Cameron
- Gavin Gordon as Captain Jordan
- Hale Hamilton as Harlan Bledsoe
- Don Alvarado as Renaldo
- George Walsh as Junk Man
- Theodore Lorch as Bledsoe, the Veterinary
- John Larkin as Eph
- Eddie Fetherston as Reporter
- Al Bridge as Hack Driver
- Bruce Covington as Doctor

== Bibliography ==
- Goble, Alan. The Complete Index to Literary Sources in Film. Walter de Gruyter, 1999.
