= Basil Sydney =

English actor (1894–1968)

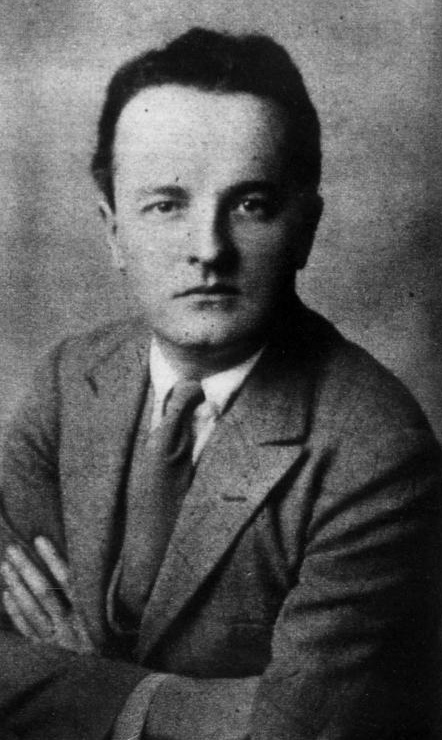
- Born: 23 April 1894; St Osyth, Essex, England
- Died: 10 January 1968 (aged 73); London, England
- Occupation: Actor
- Years active: 1920–1964
- Spouses: Doris Keane (m. 1918; div. 1925) Mary Ellis (m. 1929; div. 19??); Joyce Howard: (m. 1946; div. 19??)
- Children: 3

Basil Sydney (23 April 1894 – 10 January 1968) was an English stage and screen actor.

== Career ==
Basil Sydney and Doris Keane as Romeo and Juliet

Sydney made his name in 1915 in the London stage hit Romance by Edward Sheldon, with American Broadway star Doris Keane. He also costarred with Keane in the 1920 silent film of the play.

The couple married in 1918. When Keane revived Romance in New York City in 1921, Sydney made his Broadway debut in his lead role.

He and Keane divorced in 1925, but he stayed in New York for more than a decade playing a variety of roles, such as Mercutio in Romeo and Juliet (1922), Domin in R.U.R. (1922), Richard Dudgeon in The Devil's Disciple (1923), the title role in Hamlet (1923), Prince Hal in Henry IV, Part I (1926), and Petruchio in Taming of the Shrew (1927). In 1937 he starred in the murder mystery Blondie White in the West End.

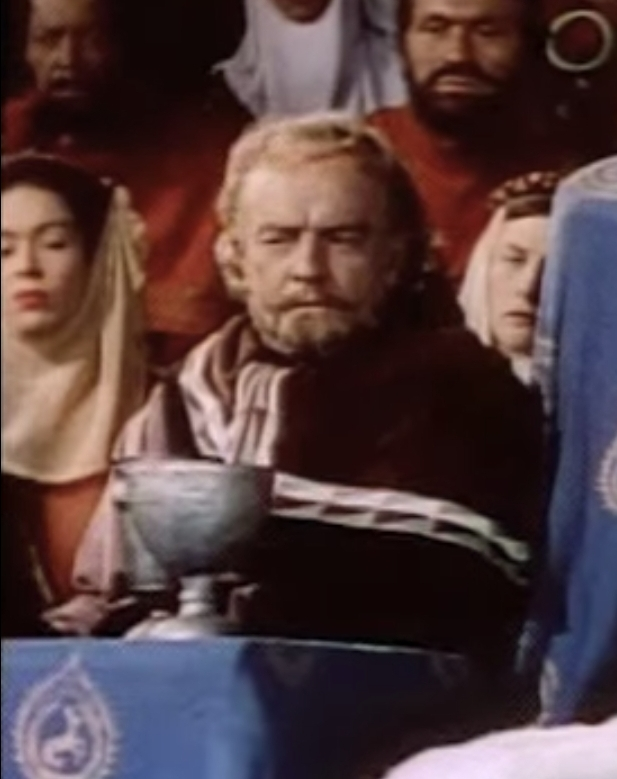
Trailer for Ivanhoe (1952)

Embracing the new art of movies, Sydney performed in more than 50 films, most memorably as Claudius in Laurence Olivier's 1948 film of Hamlet. He also appeared in classic films such as Treasure Island (1950), Ivanhoe (1952), and Around the World in Eighty Days (1956). Still, the focus of his career was always the stage, on both sides of the Atlantic.

In 1946 he starred with Flora Robson in A Man About the House at the Piccadilly Theatre.

== Personal life ==
Sydney divorced Keane in 1925. In 1929, he married actress Mary Ellis, and the couple moved to England. There he concentrated more on film than on theatre work. In the 1940s, he married English film actress Joyce Howard; they had three children.

A heavy smoker, Sydney died from pleurisy in 1968, aged 73.

== Filmography ==
- Romance (1920) as Armstrong
- Red Hot Romance (1922) as Rowland Stone
- The Midshipmaid (1932) as Cmdr. Fosberry
- The Third Clue (1934) as Reinhardt Conway
- Dirty Work (1934) as Hugh Stafford
- The Riverside Murder (1935) as Inspector Philip Winton
- White Lilac (1935) as Ian Mackie
- The Tunnel (1935) as Mostyn
- The Amateur Gentleman (1936) as Louis Chichester
- Rhodes of Africa (1936) as Dr. Jim Jameson
- Blind Man's Bluff (1936) as Dr. Peter Fairfax
- Crime Over London (1936) as 'Joker' Finnigan
- Talk of the Devil (1936) as Stephen Rindlay
- Accused (1936) as Eugene Roget
- The Four Just Men (1939) as Frank Snell
- Shadowed Eyes (1940) as Dr. Zander
- Spring Meeting (1941) as James
- The Farmer's Wife (1941) as Samuel Sweetland
- The Black Sheep of Whitehall (1942) as Costello
- Ships with Wings (1942) as Capt. Fairfax
- The Big Blockade (1942) Bit Part (uncredited)
- The Next of Kin (1942) as Naval captain
- Went the Day Well? (1942) as Major Ortler
- Caesar and Cleopatra (1945) as Rufio
- Meet Me at Dawn (1947) as Georges Vermorel
- The Man Within (1947) as Sir Henry Merriman
- Jassy (1947) as Nick Helmar
- Hamlet (1948) as Claudius - The King
- The Angel with the Trumpet (1950) as Francis Alt
- Treasure Island (1950) as Captain Smollett
- The Magic Box (1951) as William Fox-Talbot
- Ivanhoe (1952) as Waldemar Fitzurse
- Salome (1953) as Pontius Pilate
- Hell Below Zero (1954) as Bland
- Star of India (1954) as King Louis XIV
- Three's Company (1954) as Dr. Graham (segment "The Surgeon's Story")
- Simba (1955) as Mr. Crawford
- The Dam Busters (1955) as Air Chief Marshal Sir Arthur Harris
- Around the World in 80 Days (1956) as Reform Club Member #2
- Sea Wife (1957) as Bulldog
- Island in the Sun (1957) as Julian Fleury
- A Question of Adultery (1958) as Sir John Loring
- John Paul Jones (1959) as Sir William Young
- The Devil's Disciple (1959) as Lawyer Hawkins
- The 3 Worlds of Gulliver (1960) as Emperor of Lilliput
- The Hands of Orlac (1960) as Maurice Seidelman
- A Story of David (1961) as King Saul
