= Gavin Gordon (actor) =

American actor (1901–1983)

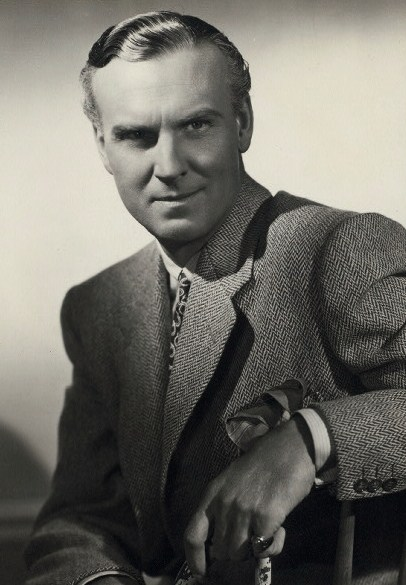
- Gordon in 1950
- Born: April 7, 1901; Chicora, Mississippi, U.S.
- Died: April 7, 1983 (aged 82); Canoga Park, California, U.S.
- Resting place: Magnolia Cemetery (Mobile, Alabama)
- Occupation: Actor
- Years active: 1929–1968
- Partner: Edward Everett Horton

Fred Gavin Gordon (April 7, 1901 – April 7, 1983) was an American film, television, and radio actor.

== Life and career ==
=== Early years ===
Born on April 7, 1901, in Chicora, Mississippi, Gordon moved to Mobile, Alabama while in his late teens. He wanted to be an actor, but he was told that his southern accent would limit his stage opportunities, so he studied stenography. He then moved to Chicago, where he found a job, took speech lessons, and tried to lose his accent. While working as a stenographer, Gordon met actor Grant Mitchell, who offered to help Gordon get started in acting when he was ready.

=== Stage ===
In 1922, Mitchell helped Gordon begin his stage career in Detroit with the Jessie Bonstelle Players. He went on to act in Jane Cowl's production of Romeo and Juliet, after which he performed in stock theater in Bethlehem, Pennsylvania. His Broadway credits included The Outsider, as well as Celebrity (1927), Sh, the Octopus (1928), Crashing Through (1928), The Gentleman From Athens (1947), The Devil's Disciple (1950), and Buy Me Blue Ribbons (1951). In 1928 Gordon joined the Stuart Walker Company.

=== Film ===
He began getting small roles at studios including at Fox Film and Paramount Pictures in 1927. After a film test, Gordon starred as Greta Garbo's leading man in Romance (1930). Garbo biographer Robert Dance called Gordon "the least remembered of all the men who supported Garbo. ...Gordon was good-looking, rather than handsome, and had a strong, rich speaking voice. But he was either utterly miscast or appallingly directed: it is hard to say even after ninety years."

An automobile accident that injured Gordon as he was to have begun shooting almost resulted in his being replaced. Although he went to set, he was too injured to work and was hospitalized for two weeks. Garbo insisted that he not be replaced and shooting continued until he could resume work.

Dance noted that Gordon's film career largely consisted of small and/or uncredited roles. With his distinctive voice, Gordon acted in numerous radio dramas. Gordon's final film appearance was in 1963's The Nutty Professor.

== Personal life and death ==
In Eccentrics of Comedy, Film historian Anthony Slide concludes his chapter on Edward Everett Horton by noting that the actor "never stopped working and never hid from the public eye.

Despite the last, Edward Everett Horton did manage to maintain a private gay relationship with actor Gavin Gordon, Garbo's leading man in Romance (1930). What a strange couple the two very different men must have made—almost as strange and eccentric a relationship as Edward Everett Horton and his mother.

Gordon died on his 82nd birthday in Canoga Park, California. He is interred in Magnolia Cemetery, Mobile, Alabama.

== Partial filmography ==
- The Medicine Men (1929; short)
- Chasing Through Europe (1929) - Don Merrill
- His First Command (1929) - Lieutenant Freddie Allen
- Romance (1930) - Tom Armstrong
- The Silver Horde (1930) - Fred Marsh
- The Great Meadow (1931) - Evan Muir
- Shipmates (1931) - Mike
- Secret Service (1931) - Mr. Arlesford
- American Madness (1932) - Cyril Cluett
- Two Against the World (1932) - Victor H. 'Vic' Linley
- The Phantom of Crestwood (1932) - Will Jones
- The Bitter Tea of General Yen (1932) - Bob
- Man Against Woman (1932) - George Perry
- Hard to Handle (1933) - John Hayden (uncredited)
- Mystery of the Wax Museum (1933) - George Winton
- Black Beauty (1933) - Captain Jordan
- I Adore You (1933) - Alphonso Bouillaboise
- Female (1933) - Briggs
- Lone Cowboy (1933) - Jim Weston
- The Scarlet Empress (1934) - Captain Gregori Orloff
- Wake Up and Dream (1934) - Seabrook
- Happiness Ahead (1934) - 'Jellie' Travis
- Bordertown (1935) - Brook Manville
- Grand Old Girl (1935) - The President
- The Good Fairy (1935) - Meredith, on-screen actor (uncredited)
- Women Must Dress (1935) - Philip Howard
- Red Hot Tires (1935) - Robert Griffin
- Bride of Frankenstein (1935) - Lord Byron
- Stranded (1935) - Jack
- Love Me Forever (1935) - Mitchell (uncredited)
- Page Miss Glory (1935) - Reporter Metz
- The Leavenworth Case (1936) - Henry Clavering
- Ticket to Paradise (1936) - Tony Bates
- High Hat (1937) - Gregory Dupont
- They Gave Him a Gun (1937) - Army Captain (uncredited)
- The Toast of New York (1937) - Southern Major (uncredited)
- Windjammer (1937) - J. Montague Forsythe
- I See Ice (1938) - Night Club Singer
- Paper Bullets (1941) - Kurt Parrish
- Murder by Invitation (1941) - Garson Denham
- Mr. Celebrity (1941) - Travers
- Suspicion (1941) - Dr. Bertram Sedbusk (uncredited)
- I Killed That Man (1941) - J. Reed
- The Lone Star Vigilantes (1942) - Major Halland Clark, a.k.a. Keller
- Centennial Summer (1946) - Trowbridge (uncredited)
- Notorious (1946) - Ernest Weylin (uncredited)
- Three on a Ticket (1947) - Pearson - a.k.a. Barton
- Philo Vance's Gamble (1947) - Oliver Tennant
- Knock on Wood (1954) - Car Salesman
- White Christmas (1954) - General Harold G. Carlton (uncredited)
- There's No Business Like Show Business (1954) - Geoffrey (uncredited)
- High Society (1955) - Frisbie the Butler
- A Life at Stake (1955) - Sam Pearson
- Alfred Hitchcock Presents (1955) (Season 1 Episode 8: "Our Cook's a Treasure") - George Brooks
- Alfred Hitchcock Presents (1956) (Season 2 Episode 9: "Crack of Doom") - Card Player
- Pardners (1956) - Businessman (uncredited)
- The Vagabond King (1956) - Majordomo
- The Ten Commandments (1956) - Trojan Ambassador (uncredited)
- Alfred Hitchcock Presents (1957) (Season 3 Episode 3: "The Perfect Crime") - Ernest West
- Johnny Tremain (1957) - Colonel Smith
- Chicago Confidential (1957) - Alan Dixon
- King Creole (1958) - Mr. Primont - Druggist (uncredited)
- The Matchmaker (1958) - Rudolph
- The Bat (1959) - Lieutenant Andy Anderson
- All in a Night's Work (1961) - Mr. Carruthers (uncredited)
- Pocketful of Miracles (1961) - Mr. Cole
- Girls! Girls! Girls! (1962) - Mr. Peabody - Hat Shop Manager (uncredited)
- The Nutty Professor (1963) - Clothing Salesman (uncredited)
- The Patsy (1964) - Executive on Golf Course
- Sylvia (1965) - Butler (uncredited)

== TV roles ==
Gordon also appeared on such television programs as Alfred Hitchcock Presents, The Adventures of Ozzie and Harriet, Perry Mason, Playhouse 90, The Real McCoys, The Red Skelton Show, Green Acres, The Beverly Hillbillies, and Petticoat Junction.
