= Enter Madame (1922 film) =

1922 film by Wallace Worsley

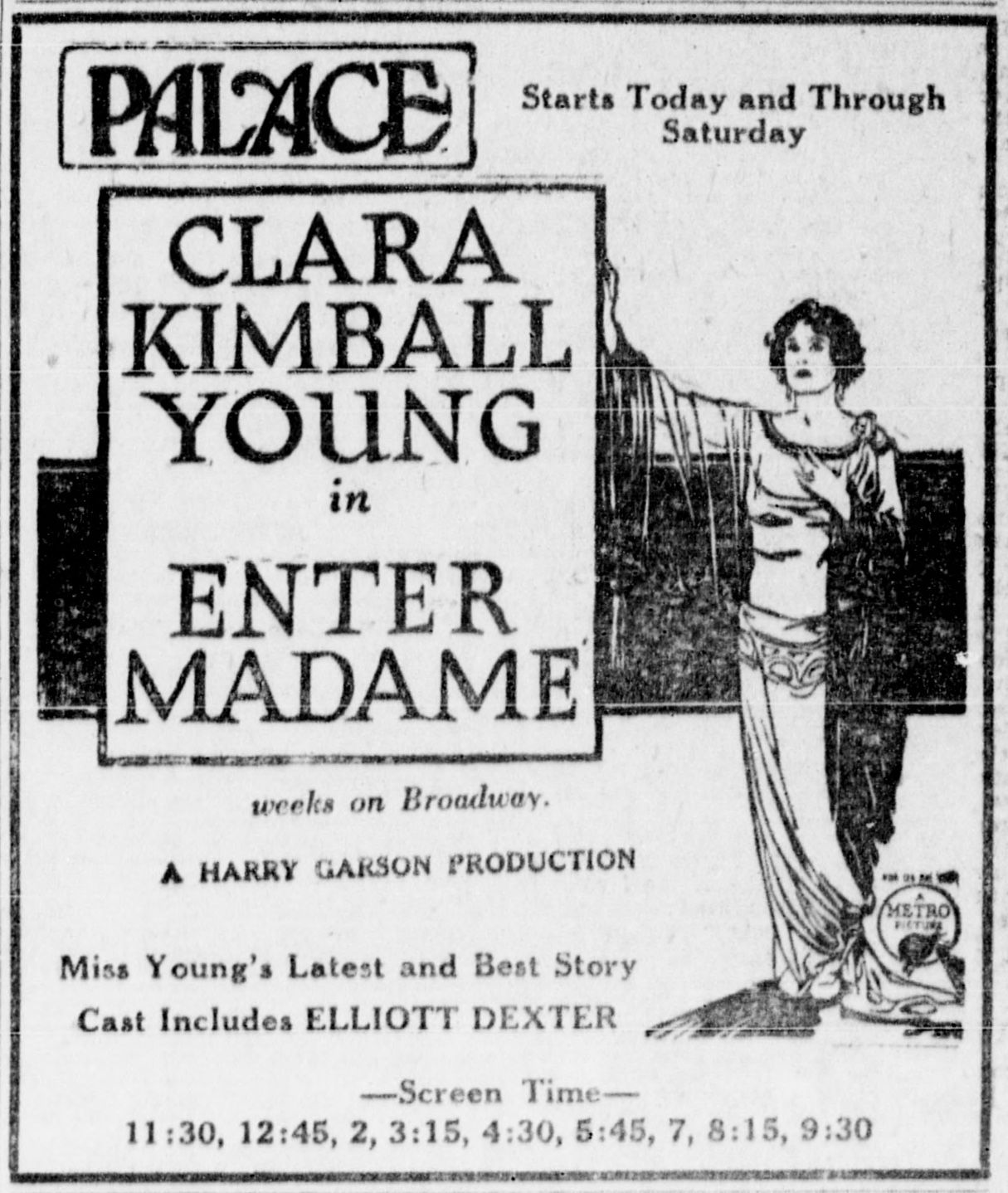
- Newspaper advertisement
- Directed by: Wallace Worsley
- Based on: Enter Madame by Dolly Byrne and Gilda Varesi
- Produced by: Harry Garson
- Starring: Clara Kimball Young; Louise Dresser
- Cinematography: L. William O'Connell
- Distributed by: Metro Pictures
- Release date: November 13, 1922
- Running time: 7 reels; (6,500 feet)
- Country: United States
- Language: Silent

Enter Madame is a 1922 American silent romantic comedy film produced by Harry Garson for his star Clara Kimball Young. Wallace Worsley directed. The film was based on a 1920 Broadway play of the same name by Dolly Byrne and Gilda Varesi. Prints of the film exist in two or three European archives. The film was remade under the same name in 1935.

== Cast ==
- Clara Kimball Young as Prima Donna Lisa Della Robio
- Elliott Dexter as Gerald Fitzgerald
- Louise Dresser as Mrs. Flora Preston
- Lionel Belmore as Archimede
- Wedgwood Nowell as Doctor (*Wedgewood Nowell)
- Rosita Marstini as Bice
- Ora Devereaux as Miss Smith
- Arthur Rankin as John Fitzgerald
- Mary Jane Sanderson as Aline Chalmers
- George Kuwa as Tomamoto
