= Lily of the Dust =

1924 film by Dimitri Buchowetzki

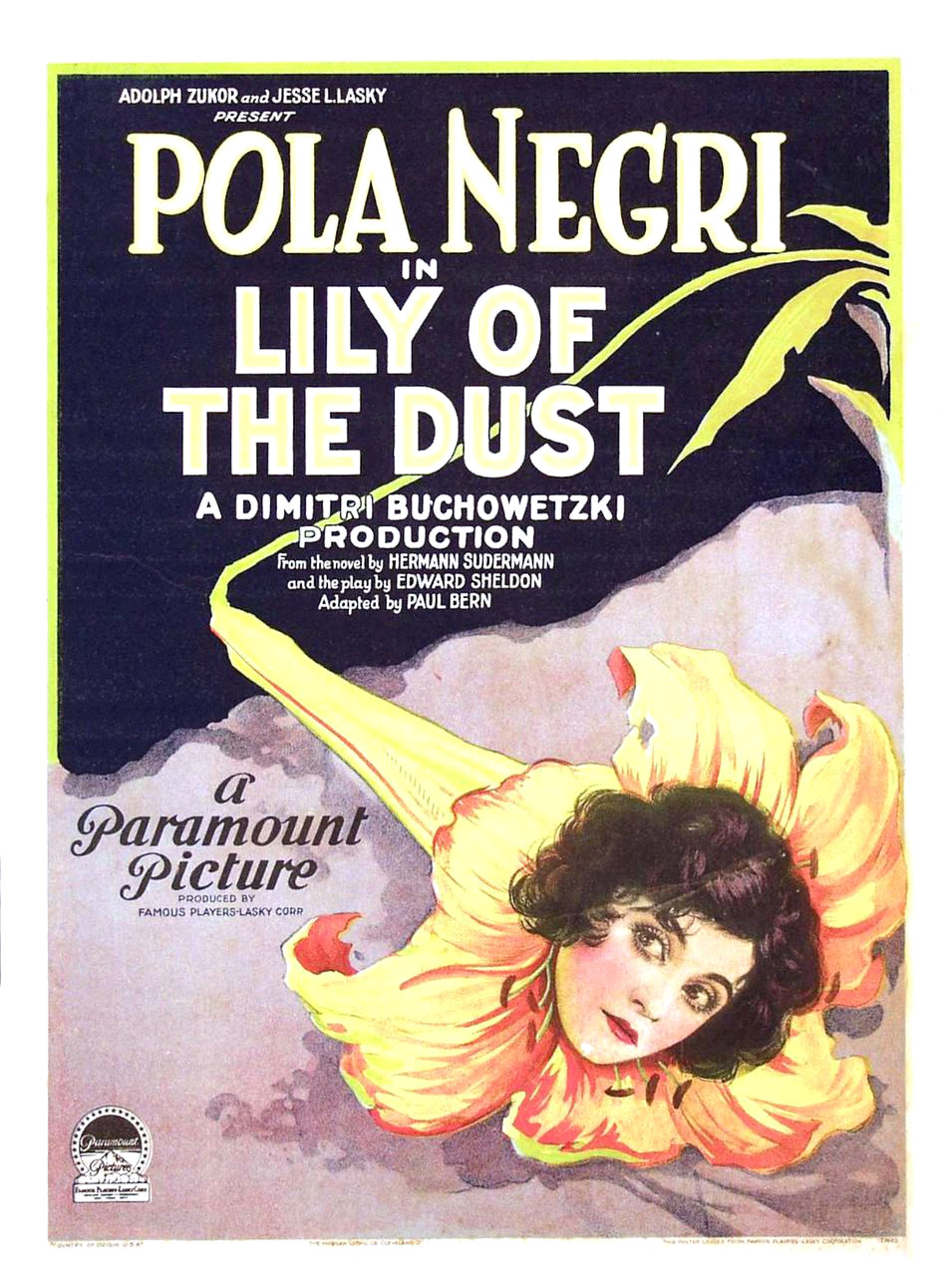
- Film poster
- Directed by: Dimitri Buchowetzki
- Written by: Paul Bern (scenario)
- Based on: Das hohe Lied (novel) by Hermann Sudermann The Song of Songs (play) by Edward Sheldon
- Produced by: Adolph Zukor; Jesse L. Lasky
- Starring: Pola Negri; Ben Lyon
- Cinematography: Alvin Wyckoff
- Production company: Famous Players–Lasky
- Distributed by: Paramount Pictures
- Release date: August 24, 1924
- Running time: 7 reels, 6,811 feet
- Country: United States
- Language: Silent (English intertitles)

Lily of the Dust is a 1924 American silent drama film directed by Dimitri Buchowetzki, starring Pola Negri, produced by Famous Players–Lasky, and distributed by Paramount Pictures. This movie was based on the 1908 novel The Song of Songs (German: Das hohe Lied) by Hermann Sudermann and the 1914 Broadway play The Song of Songs by Edward Sheldon.

This film is a remake of the American silent film The Song of Songs (1918).

== Cast ==
- Pola Negri as Lily
- Ben Lyon as Lieutenant Prell
- Noah Beery as Colonel Mertzbach
- Raymond Griffith as Karl Dehnecke
- Jeanette Daudet as Julia
- William J. Kelly as Walter von Prell
- Alan George in an Undetermined Secondary Role (uncredited)

== Production ==
Negri was happy working with director Buchowetzki, who had also directed her in Men (1924) and in the German film Sappho (1921), which had been released in the U.S. as Mad Love, as her performances turned out well in his films. Buchowetzki would later direct her once more in the romantic drama film The Crown of Lies (1926).

== Censorship ==
Before the film could be exhibited in Kansas, the Kansas Board of Review required the elimination of the scene where a man's corset is being laced up.

== Preservation ==
With no copies of Lily of the Dust located in any film archives, it is a lost film.
