= Enter Madame (1935 film) =

1935 film by Elliott Nugent

- Theater poster, 1935
- Directed by: Elliott Nugent
- Written by: Gilda Varesi Archibald (play Enter Madame); Charles Brackett (screenplay)
- Starring: Cary Grant; Elissa Landi
- Cinematography: Theodor Sparkuhl
- Music by: Heinz Roemheld
- Distributed by: Paramount Pictures
- Release date: January 4, 1935
- Running time: 83 minutes
- Country: United States
- Language: English

Enter Madame is a 1935 American romantic comedy film directed by Elliott Nugent, starring Elissa Landi and Cary Grant, and released by Paramount Pictures.

The film is based on a three-act play of the same name that ran from August 16, 1920, to April 1922 at the Garrick Theatre in New York City for a total of 350 performances. The stage version was directed by Brock Pemberton. The 1935 movie was a remake of a 1922 silent film starring Clara Kimball Young and Louise Dresser.

== Cast ==
- Elissa Landi as Lisa Della Robbia
- Cary Grant as Gerald Fitzgerald
- Lynne Overman as Mr. Farnum
- Sharon Lynn as Flora Preston
- Michelette Burani as Bice
- Paul Porcasi as Archimede
- Adrian Rosley as Doctor
- Cecilia Parker as Aline Chalmers
- Frank Albertson as John Fitzgerald
- Wilfred Hari as Tamamoto
- Torben Meyer as Carlson
- Harold Berquist as Bjorgenson
- Diana Lewis as Operator
- Richard Bonelli as Scarpia in 'La Tosca'
- Ann Sheridan as Flora's Shipboard Friend (as Clara Lou Sheridan)

== Production credits ==
- Elliott Nugent - director
- Benjamin Glazer - producer
- Gladys Lehman - screenplay
- Charles Brackett - screenplay
- Nathaniel Finston - musical direction
- Travis Banton - costume design
- Theodor Sparkuhl - photography
- William C. Mellor - photography
- Ernst Fegté - art director
