= Doris Keane =

American actress (1881–1945)

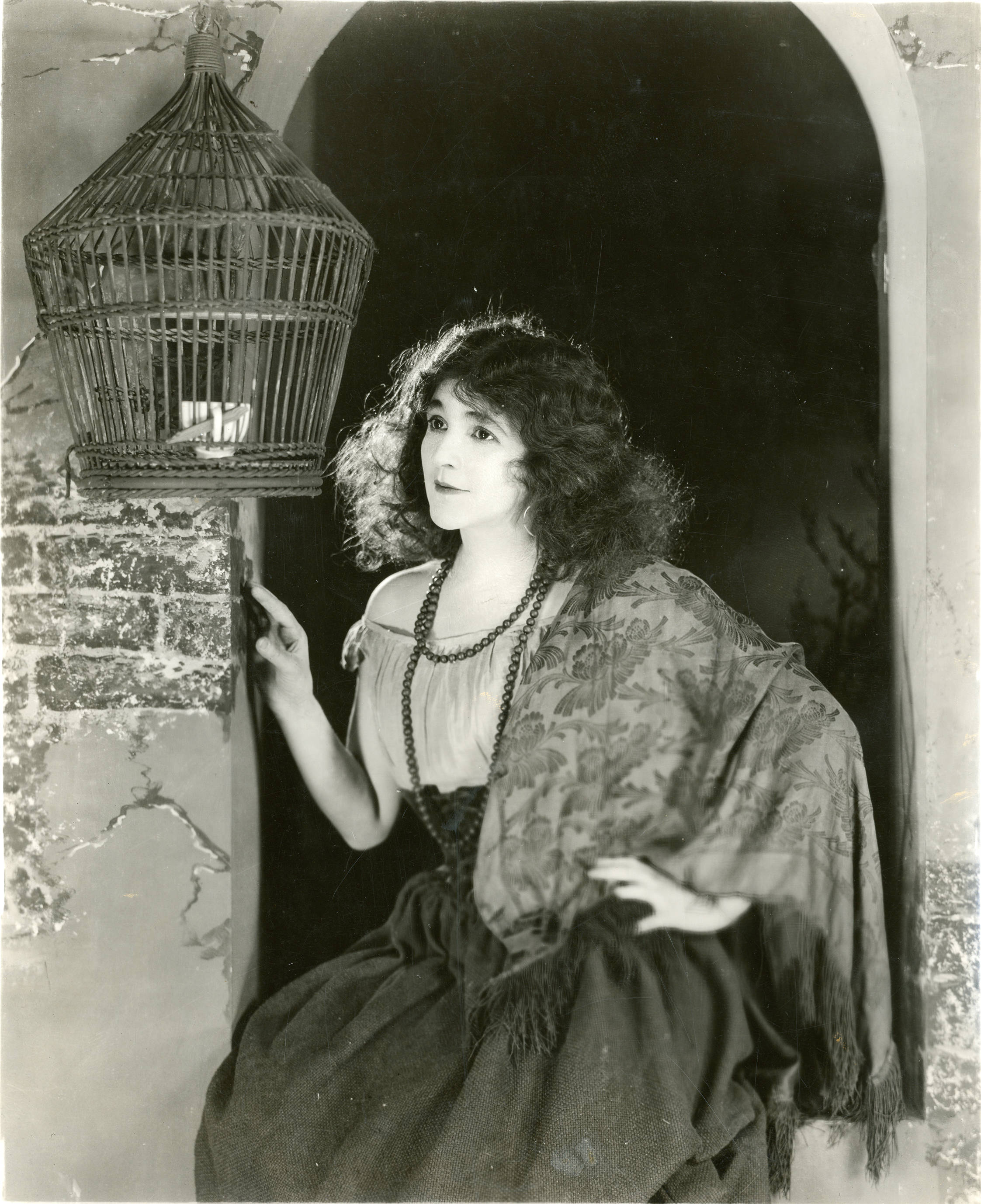
- Keane in 1925
- Born: December 12, 1881; St. Joseph, Michigan, U.S.
- Died: November 25, 1945 (aged 63); New York City, U.S.
- Resting place: Tower Hill Cemetery, Edgartown Dukes County Massachusetts
- Occupation: Actress
- Years active: 1903–1925
- Spouse: Basil Sydney (m. 1918; div. 1925)
- Children: 1

Doris Keane (December 12, 1881 – November 25, 1945) was an American actress, primarily in live theatre. She played the lead role in Edwaed Sheldon's "Romance" for more than five years, in both the United States, London and Europe, and also in film.

== Early life and family ==
Keane was born in Michigan to Joseph Keane and Florence Winter. She was educated privately in Chicago, New York, Paris, and Rome and at the American Academy of Dramatic Arts.

== Career ==
Her first professional role was in Whitewashing Julia in 1903. This was a small role, but she went on to play leading roles in The Happy Marriage in 1909 and The Lights o' London in 1911.

In 1913, she played Margherita Cavallini in Edward Sheldon's Romance. Her leading man in this long-running play was William Courtenay, who played the part of a priest. Sheldon originally had offered the male lead to his friend John Barrymore, but Barrymore turned it down, preferring to continue to perform comedies. Sheldon reportedly fell in love with Keane and yearned for her all his life.

She played the part of Cavallini in the United States and Europe, particularly with long runs in London, for the next five years. She returned to it in revivals that were produced regularly during the 1920s.

In 1918 at the Lyric Theatre, London, Keane was the star of Roxana, a comedy by Avery Hopwood. She played the role of Roxana Clayton opposite a younger English actor, Basil Sydney.

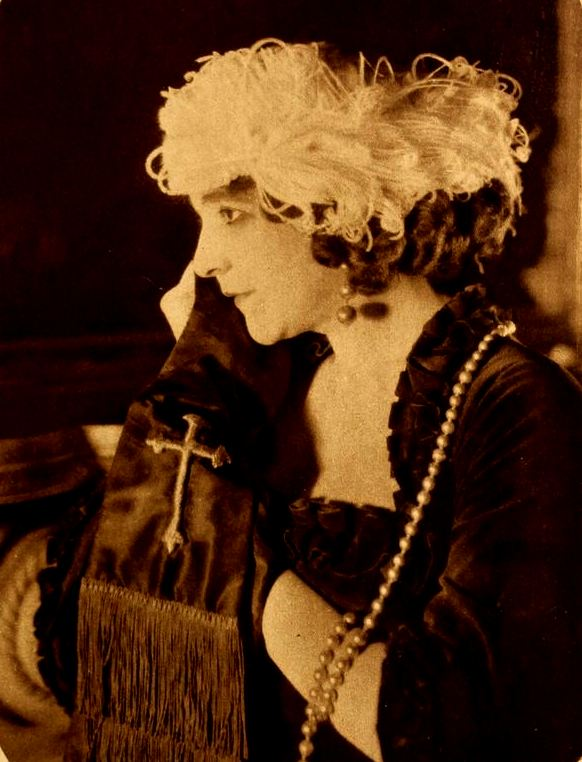
Keane in the film Romance (1920)

In 1920, she made a silent film of Romance; it was distributed by the newly formed United Artists. Her male lead in the film was again Basil Sydney. She played Catherine the Great in Czarina in 1922 after Sheldon had revised the play especially for her.

== Personal life ==
Basil Sydney and Doris Keane as Romeo and Juliet

Keane became pregnant and her daughter Ronda Keane (1915–2008) while unmarried. The girl was born in Cannes, France, in the period when Keane was performing in Europe. Ronda's father was wealthy American financier and socialite Howard Gould, whom Keane likely had met in New York. He acknowledged his paternity but never married Doris. In 1951 Ronda married Dr Carl Muschenheim, a New York-based thoracic specialist.

While acting with Basil Sydney in London in 1918, Keane and he fell in love and married that year. They divorced in 1925.

Doris Keane was an avid reader, and left an extensive library at her death. It included a copy of The Upanishads.

Known from her theatre and film work, she became a favorite subject of contemporary artists, among them sculptor Jacob Epstein and portraitist De Laszlo.

In a more popular line, the Royal Doulton company produced at lesst two bone china figurines of her. One version of Keane holds a monkey, the type that was notable in the play Romance.

== Death ==
On November 25, 1945, Keane died of cancer in New York City at the LeRoy Sanitarium.
