= Vanity Fair (1911 film) =

1911 film produced by Vitagraph Studios

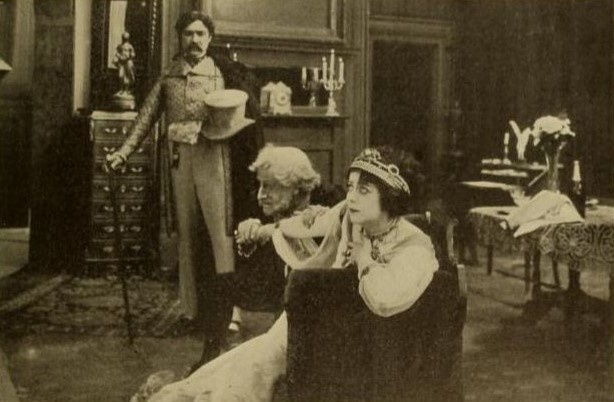
- Scene still taken from The Moving Picture World
- Directed by: Charles Kent
- Written by: Eugene Mullin
- Based on: Vanity Fair; 1848 novel by William Makepeace Thackeray
- Starring: Helen Gardner; Leo Delaney; Rose E. Tapley
- Production company: Vitagraph Studios
- Release date: December 19, 1911
- Running time: 35 minutes
- Country: United States
- Language: Silent (English intertitles)

Vanity Fair is a 1911 silent film adaptation of William Makepeace Thackeray's 1848 novel of the same name. Produced by Vitagraph Studios, it was one of the company's first three-reel productions, along with A Tale of Two Cities (1911).

== Plot ==
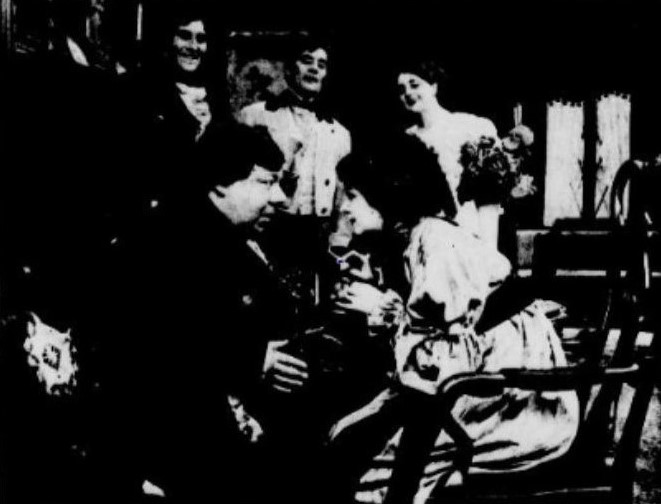
Becky Sharp charms Jos Sedley

=== Reel 1 ===
Amelia Sedley, accompanied by Miss Becky Sharpe, returns from boarding school. Becky is a natural born flirt. Bashful Joseph Sedley falls desperately in love with her. He takes her to Vauxhall Gardens, where he makes an ass of himself, is very much ashamed, and refuses to keep his appointment with Becky the next day, sailing for Scotland to escape her wiles. Amelia, with her gentle sweetness, hands Becky a letter from Sir Pitt Crawley, requesting her to repair to Queen's Crawley at once. The next morning, bright and early, she takes her departure to enter Sir Pitt's household as a governess, where she meets Rawdon Crawley, youngest son of Sir Pitt, who falls captive to her charms, bringing upon himself the displeasure of the whole Pitt family. He, notwithstanding, marries Becky.

=== Reel 2 ===
After their marriage, Becky Sharpe and Rawdon Crawley take up elegant lodgings at Mayfair. Rawdon, who is a captain in the English Army, is resplendent in his uniform. They are visited by their military friends; Captain Dobbin is there with Amelia Osborne and her husband, Lieutenant Osborne, who is fascinated by Mrs. Crawley. A week later they sail for Brussels. At Brussels they attend a ball given by the Duchess of Richmond, at which Becky meets the Marquis of Steyn and where they receive notice of the Battle of Waterloo. All is excitement and the others are soon on their way to the field of action, where Lieutenant Osborne is killed. A month after the battle, Becky Crawley turns to the ensnaring of Lord Steyne, who with crafty and villainous intent, lays siege to the overthrow of Captain Crawley in order that he may continue his alliance with his wife. Crawley gets heavily in debt at the gaming tables of Lory Steyne, is unable to pay and the unscrupulous Steyne throws him into prison.

=== Reel 3 ===
Colonel Rawdon Crawley writes a note to his wife to raise money to secure his release. She replies falsely that she is sick but will implore Lord Steyne to show Rawdon leniency, signing herself, "Yours affectionately, Becky." Colonel Crawley, in despair, sends to his brother for assistance. Pitt hastens to his brother's succor. Rawdon immediately goes to big wife's apartments and finds her with Lord Steyne, whom he throttles, and leaves Becky forever. Major William Dobbin marries Amelia Osborne. Amelia and Major Dobbin learn of Becky's downfall. They visit her in her misfortune and find her dissipated but unconquered. She refuses aid from Mr. and Mrs. Dobbin and is left by her friends to her own waywardness.

== Cast ==
Vanity Fair reportedly made use of Vitagraph's entire company of stock players. The following cast members are named by The Moving Picture World:

- Helen Gardner as Becky Sharp
- William V. Ranous as Lord Steyne
- Harry Northrup as Rawdon Crawley
- Alec B. Francis as Pitt Crawley
- John Bunny as Jos Sedley
- Leo Delaney as George Osborne
- Tefft Johnson as Captain Dobbin
- Kate Price as Miss Crawley
- William Shea as Sir Pitt Crawley
- Charles Kent as John Sedley
- B. F. Clinton as Mrs. Sedley
- Rose E. Tapley as Amelia Sedley

== Production ==
The Moving Picture World reported in October 1911 that the film was nearly completed. The film was directed by Charles Kent.

== Release and reception ==
The film was released on December 19, 1911. In contrast to A Tale of Two Cities (1911), all three reels of Vanity Fair were released on the same day.

According to The Moving Picture World, the film "comes nearer to being a flawless adaptation than anything else that has appeared in moving pictures".

Vitagraph continued making three-reelers based on classic literature throughout the 1910s.
