= Vanity Fair (1915 film) =

1915 film

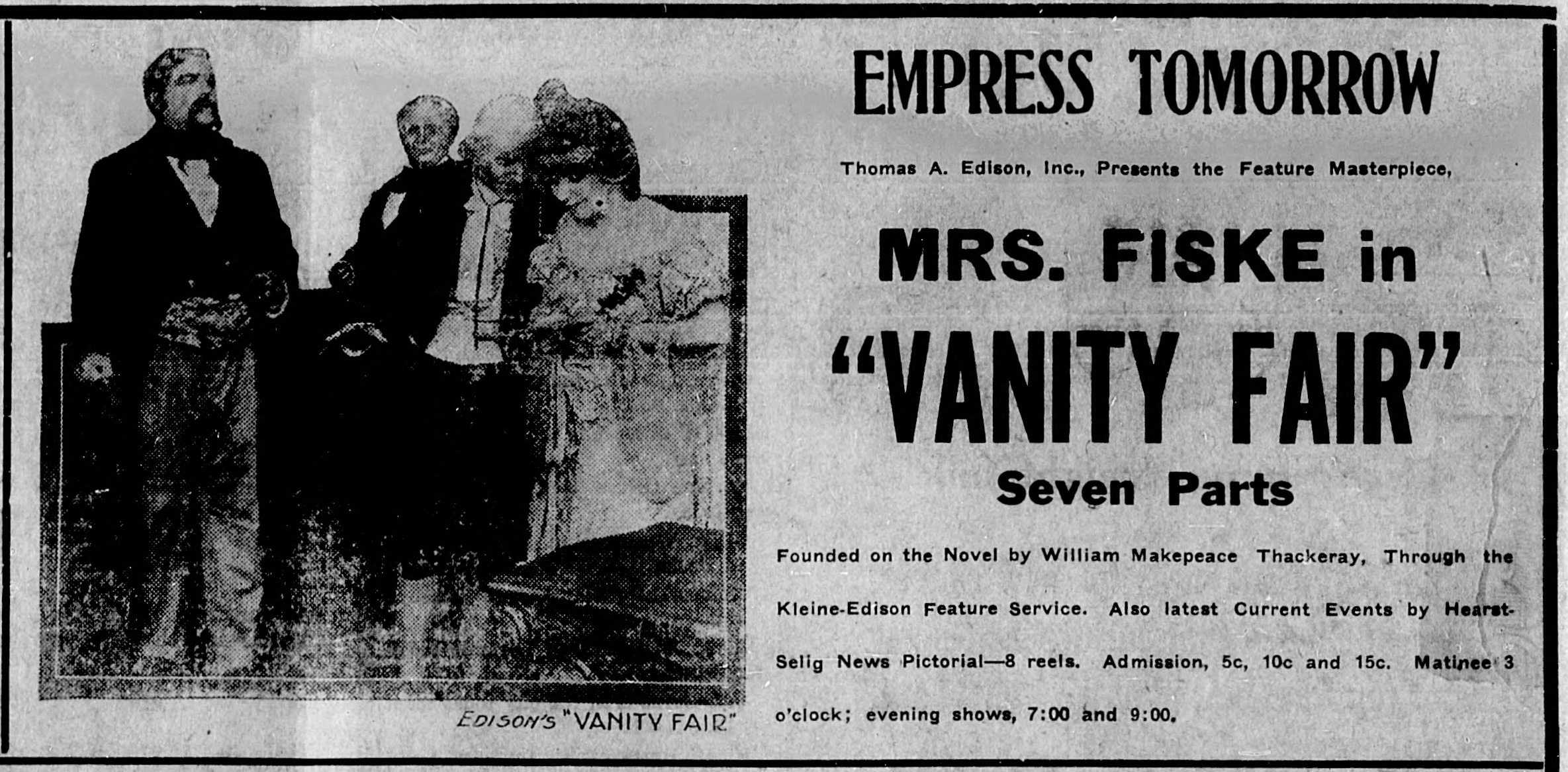
- Contemporary advertisement
- Directed by: Eugene Nowland; Charles Brabin
- Written by: Charles Sumner Williams; Eugene Nowland
- Based on: Vanity Fair; 1848 novel by William Makepeace Thackeray
- Produced by: Edison Company; George Kleine
- Starring: Mrs. Fiske
- Cinematography: Otto Brautigan
- Distributed by: Kleine-Edison Feature Service
- Release date: October 6, 1915
- Running time: 7 reels
- Country: USA
- Language: silent..English titles

Vanity Fair is a 1915 American silent drama film directed by Eugene Nowland and Charles Brabin and starring Mrs. Fiske, a renowned Broadway stage actress. The Edison Company produced and released the film. Mrs. Fiske had starred in the 1899 hit Broadway play Becky Sharp based on William Thackeray's 1848 novel of the same name. Here she recreates the role for Edison's cameras. This film marks Mrs. Fiske's second feature film as she had starred in Tess of the d'Urbervilles for Adolph Zukor in 1913. Despite the popularity of Vanity Fair, Mrs. Fiske never made another motion picture.

An earlier version was made in 1911 with Helen Gardner. A British feature appeared in 1922 and in 1923 Goldwyn Pictures made Vanity Fair.

The film is preserved in the Library of Congress collection.

Excerpt from the film

== Cast ==
- Mrs. Fiske - Becky Sharp
- Shirley Mason - Becky as a child (*as Leonie Flugrath)
- Yale Benner - Rakedell Sharp
- Helen Fulton - Amelia Sedley
- William Wadsworth - Joseph Sedley
- Richard Tucker - George Osborne
- Robert Brower - Mr. Osborne
- Frank McGlynn Sr. - Captain William Dobbin
- Bigelow Cooper - Rawdon Crawley
- George A. Wright - Lord Steyne
- Maurice Steuart - George Sedley Osborne (as Maurice Stewart Jr.)
- Helen Strickland - Lady Steyne
- Philip Quinn - Napoleon
- John Sturgeon - Major O'Dowd
- Arthur Row - Pitt Crawley
