= Cleopatra (1912 film) =

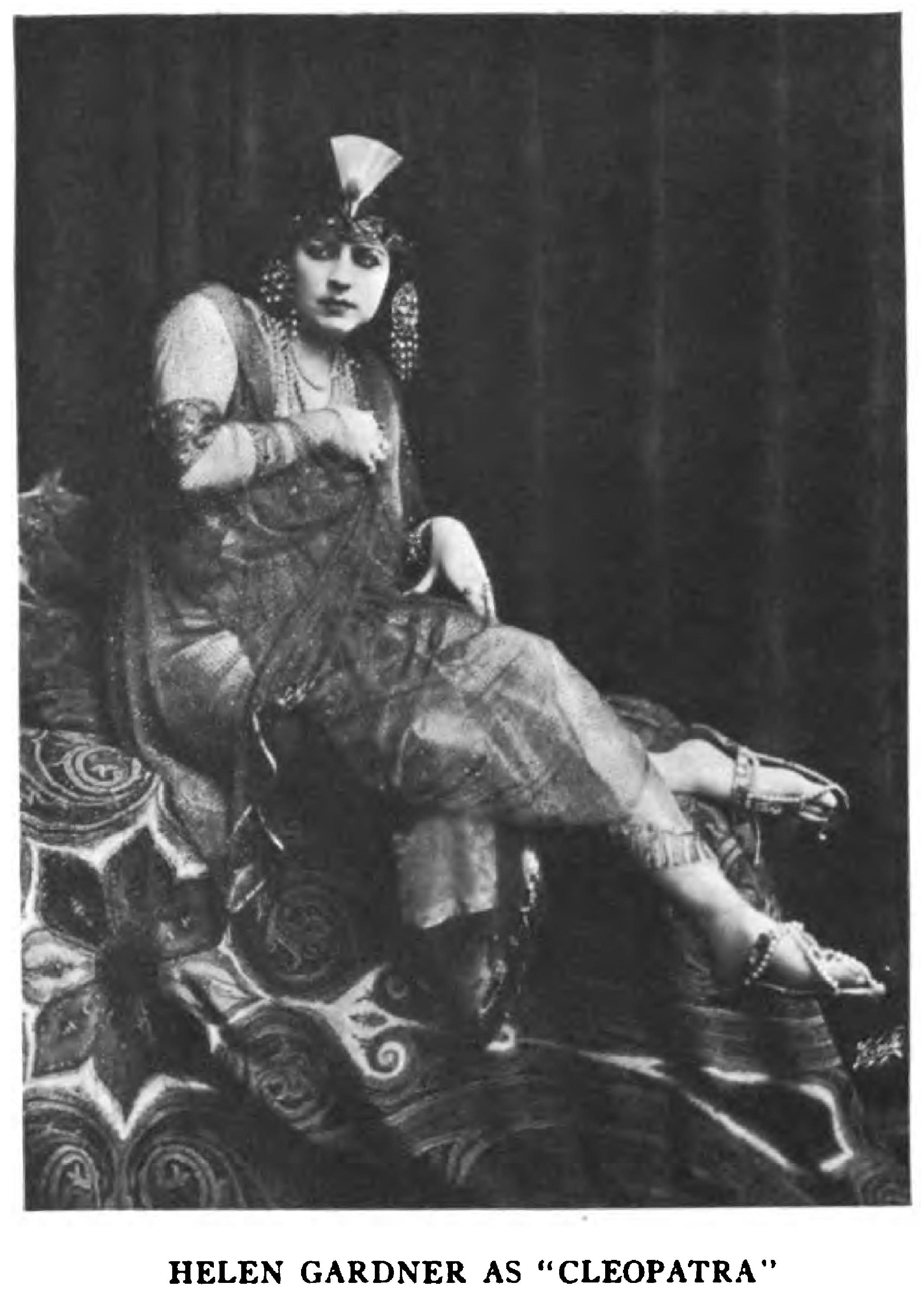
- Directed by: Charles L. Gaskill
- Screenplay by: Charles L. Gaskill (uncredited)
- Based on: Cléopâtre; 1890 play by Victorien Sardou
- Produced by: Helen Gardner
- Starring: Helen Gardner
- Cinematography: Lucien Tainguy
- Edited by: Helen Gardner (uncredited)
- Production company: The Helen Gardner Picture Players
- Distributed by: United States Film Co.
- Release date: November 13, 1912
- Running time: 87 minutes
- Country: United States
- Budget: $45,000 ($1,411,636 today)

Cleopatra

Cleopatra is a 1912 American silent historical drama film starring Helen Gardner in the title role and directed by Charles L. Gaskill, based on the 1890 play written by Victorien Sardou. It was the first film to be produced by The Helen Gardner Picture Players.

Cleopatra is one of the early six-reel feature films produced in the United States. Promoted as "The most beautiful motion picture ever made", it was the first to offer a feature-length depiction of Cleopatra, although there had been a short film about Antony and Cleopatra two years earlier.

== Synopsis ==
In a series of staged tableaux, Cleopatra presents the dramatic arc of the Egyptian queen’s life through richly designed scenes that emphasize spectacle and visual storytelling. The narrative begins with Cleopatra's romantic involvement with Pharon, a handsome fisherman and slave, who captures her attention with his strength and sincerity. Their brief but passionate affair highlights Cleopatra’s impulsive nature and her fascination with both power and vulnerability.

However, as political tensions rise and her responsibilities as queen grow more pressing, Cleopatra ultimately casts Pharon aside, prioritizing ambition over emotion. The story then shifts to her more historically renowned relationship with Mark Antony, the Roman general. Their union is portrayed as a consuming and tragic romance—filled with political intrigue, shared decadence, and a deep emotional bond.

As the film progresses, the grandeur of their love is matched by the opulence of the sets and costumes, creating a heightened sense of drama. Through Cleopatra’s relationships—first with the humble Pharon and later with the mighty Antony—the film explores her complex character: a woman torn between passion, power, and the looming shadow of fate.

== Cast ==
- Helen Gardner as Cleopatra (credited as Miss Gardner)
- Pearl Sindelar as Iras, an attendant (credited as Miss Sindelar)
- Miss Fielding as Charmian, an attendant [First name unknown]
- Miss Robson as Octavia, wife of Antony [First name unknown]
- Helene Costello as Nicola, a child (credited as Miss Helene)
- Charles Sindelar as Antony, a triumvir and general (credited as Mr. Sindelar)
- Mr. Howard as Pharon, a Greek slave and fisherman [First name unknown]
- James R. Waite as Venditius, a Roman soldier (credited as Mr. Waite)
- Mr. Osborne as Diomedes, a rich Egyptian [First name unknown]
- Harry Knowles as Kephren, captain of guards to the queen (credited as Mr. Knowles)
- Mr. Paul as Octavius, a triumvir and general [First name unknown]
- Mr. Brady as Serapian, an Egyptian priest [First name unknown]
- Mr. Corker as Ixias, servant to Ventidius [First name unknown]

== Production ==
Cleopatra was the first film produced by The Helen Gardner Picture Players, Helen Gardner's production company, located in Tappan, New York. Gardner created the company in 1910 after finding success in a series of early 1900s Vitagraph shorts.

The film's budget was $45,000 (approximately $1,555,000 today) and featured lavish sets and costumes (Gardner also served as the film's costume designer and editor). Gardner used the natural Tappan scenery for outdoor shots in addition to sets.

== Releases ==
Upon its release, Cleopatra played in opera houses and theatres. The film was also featured in a theatrical roadshow accompanied by a publicist, manager and a lecturer/projectionist.

In 1918, Gardner filmed additional scenes and re-issued the film to compete with the 1917 adaptation released by Fox starring Theda Bara.

== Reception ==
Film critic Dennis Schwartz described it as "energetic", giving it a B− rating.

== Censorship ==
Like many American films of the time, Cleopatra was subject to cuts by city and state film censorship boards. For the 1918 release, the Chicago Board of Censors required a cut of the two intertitles "If I let you live and love me ten days, will you then destroy yourself?" and "Suppose Anthony were told that she [Cleopatra] had just left the embraces of the slave Pharon".

== Retrospective appraisal ==
Literary and film critic Edward Wagenknecht reports that he had “much desired” to see Gardner’s 1912 six-reel production of Sardou’s Cleopatra when he was a 12-year-old boy. Not until 1961 did Wagenknecht have an opportunity to view the feature:

I am sorry that it did not turn out to be worth waiting forty-nine years for, since Miss Gardner was as inexplicably bad in Cleopatra, in which she did an unsuccessful imitation of Sarah Bernhardt, as she was good in Vanity Fair (1911).

== Status and restorations ==
The 1912 version of Cleopatra still exists in its entirety. In 2000, Turner Classic Movies had the print restored, using an earlier 1960s restoration, and commissioned a new musical score from the husband and wife team of Chantal Kreviazuk and Raine Maida. The restored version, complete with color tinting, first aired on TCM in August 2000.
