= The Blue Envelope Mystery =

1916 film by Wilfrid North

- Directed by: Wilfrid North
- Written by: Helen Duey
- Based on: Blue Envelope (novel) by Sophie Kerr
- Produced by: Vitagraph Company of America
- Starring: Lillian Walker
- Cinematography: Tom Malloy
- Distributed by: Greater Vitagraph (V-L-S-E)
- Release date: October 23, 1916
- Running time: 5 reels
- Country: USA
- Language: Silent (English intertitles)

The Blue Envelope Mystery is a lost 1916 silent film drama directed by Wilfrid North and starring Lillian Walker. It was produced by the Vitagraph Company of America. Future star Adolphe Menjou has one of his earliest appearances in the film.

== Cast ==
- Lillian Walker - Leslie Brennan
- John Drew Bennett - Ewen Kennedy (*John D. Bennet)
- Bob Hay - Harry Heath
- Charles Kent - Uncle Bob
- Josephine Earle - Miss Lacy
- Harry Northrup - Fischer
- Florence Radinoff - Mrs. Davis
- Isabel West - Mrs. Harris (*Isabelle West)
- William Shea - George
- Adolphe Menjou - bit part
