= Twelfth Night (1910 film) =

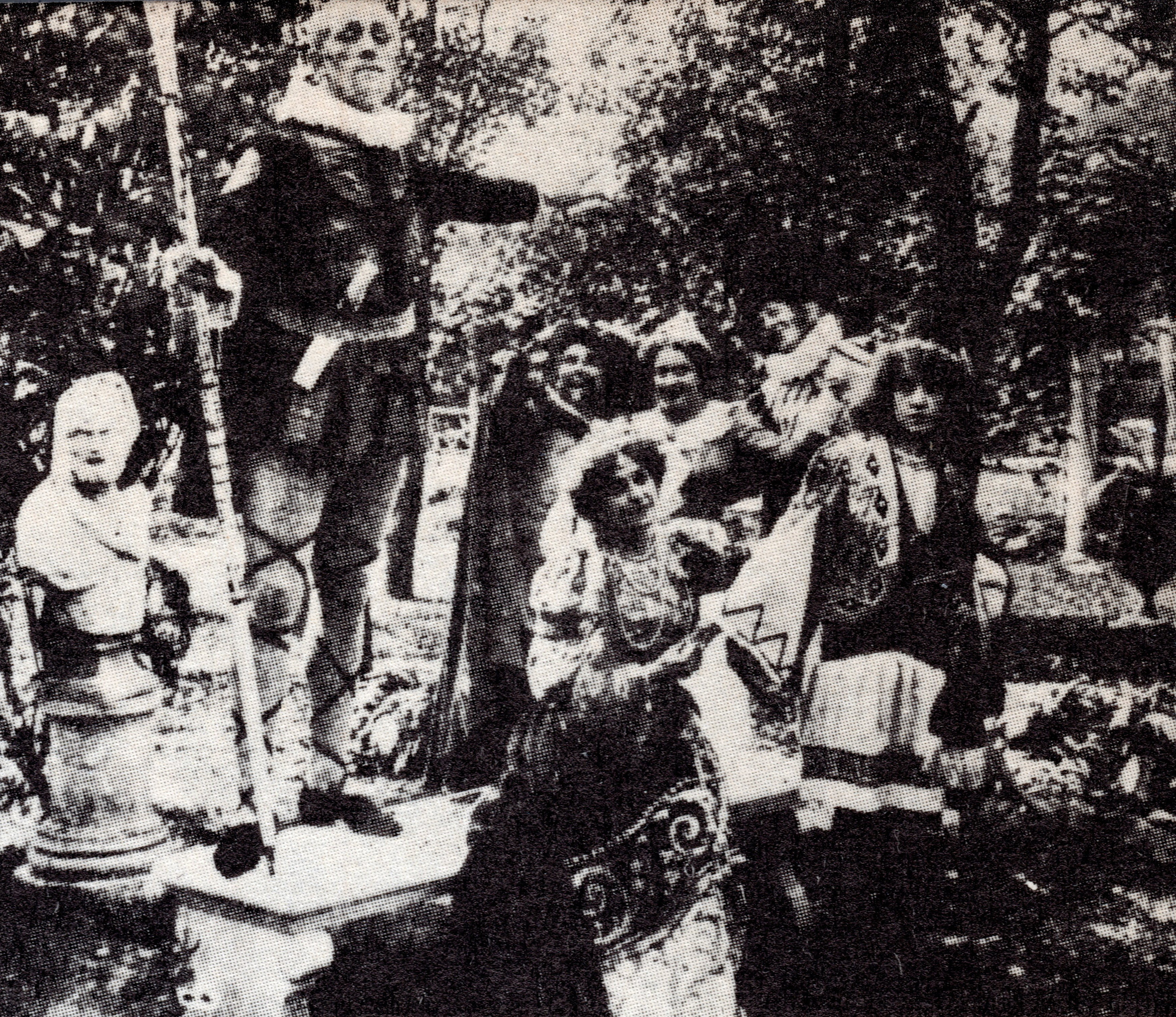
- Directed by: Eugene Mullin; Charles Kent; William V. Ranous
- Written by: Eugene Mullin
- Based on: play Twelfth Night by William Shakespeare
- Produced by: Vitagraph Company; J. Stuart Blackton
- Starring: Julia Swayne Gordon
- Distributed by: Vitagraph Company
- Release date: February 5, 1910
- Running time: 12 minutes; 1 reel
- Country: USA
- Language: Silent..English titles

Twelfth Night is a 1910 silent short film directed by Eugene Mullin and Charles Kent. It is based on William Shakespeare's play Twelfth Night. It was produced and distributed by the Vitagraph Company of America.

== Cast ==
- Julia Swayne Gordon - Olivia
- Charles Kent - Malvolio
- Florence Turner - Viola
- Edith Storey - Sebastian
- Tefft Johnson - Orsino
- Marin Sais - Maria
- William J. Humphrey - Sir Toby Belch
- James Young - Sir Andrew Aguecheek

== Synopsis ==
Twelfth Night (1910)

Viola and her twin brother Sebastian, while on a sea voyage, are shipwrecked. Viola is rescued and Sebastian is supposed to have been lost. Among the wreckage on the coast Sebastian's trunk is found by Viola. When she opens it and sees her brother's clothing, she decides to disguise herself as a boy. Learning that she is within the realm of the young Duke Orsino, she repairs to his castle, where she is employed as his page.

The Duke is apparently very much in love with Olivia, a rich countess. Nothing daunted, Viola falls in love with the Duke, who adds to her discomfiture by sending her, as his page, with a message of love to Olivia. As soon as Olivia beholds the handsome young page, she falls in love with Viola, thinking that she is a boy. She presents the page with a jewel, and later, through her pompous steward, Malvolio, with a ring.

Sebastian, in search for his sister, meets Viola by chance at the house of Olivia and the two are once more united. Explanations follow, and Olivia finds it an easy matter to transfer her affections to Sebastian, who falls madly in love with Olivia.

Orsino finds Olivia in the embrace of Sebastian. Viola now appears before the Duke as herself -a sweet and attractive girl. She tells him of her impersonation of her brother and the page. Orsino is so struck by her beauty and cleverness that he declares his love for her and asks her to become his wife. Each one comes into his own. "All's well that ends well" and everybody is happy.

== Preservation status ==
- Copies are held at BFI National Film and Television Archive and the Library of Congress.
