= His Sister's Children =

1911 American silent film short

- Starring: Dolores Costello; Helene Costello; John Bunny
- Production company: Vitagraph Company of America
- Distributed by: General Film Company
- Release date: September 26, 1911 (U.S.)
- Country: United States

His Sister's Children is a 1911 American silent black and white comedy film produced by Vitagraph Company of America and distributed by General Film Company.

== Cast ==
- Dolores Costello as Buster aka Budge - One of the Children
- Helen Costello as Boxer aka Toodle - One of the Children
- John Bunny
- Maurice Costello as Harry Burton - the Children's Uncle
- Rose E. Tapley as Helen Manton - Harry's Sweetheart
- Tefft Johnson as Harry's Sister's Husband
- Miss E. Dominicus as Harry's Sister
