= A Tale of Two Cities (1911 film) =

1911 film produced by Vitagraph Studios

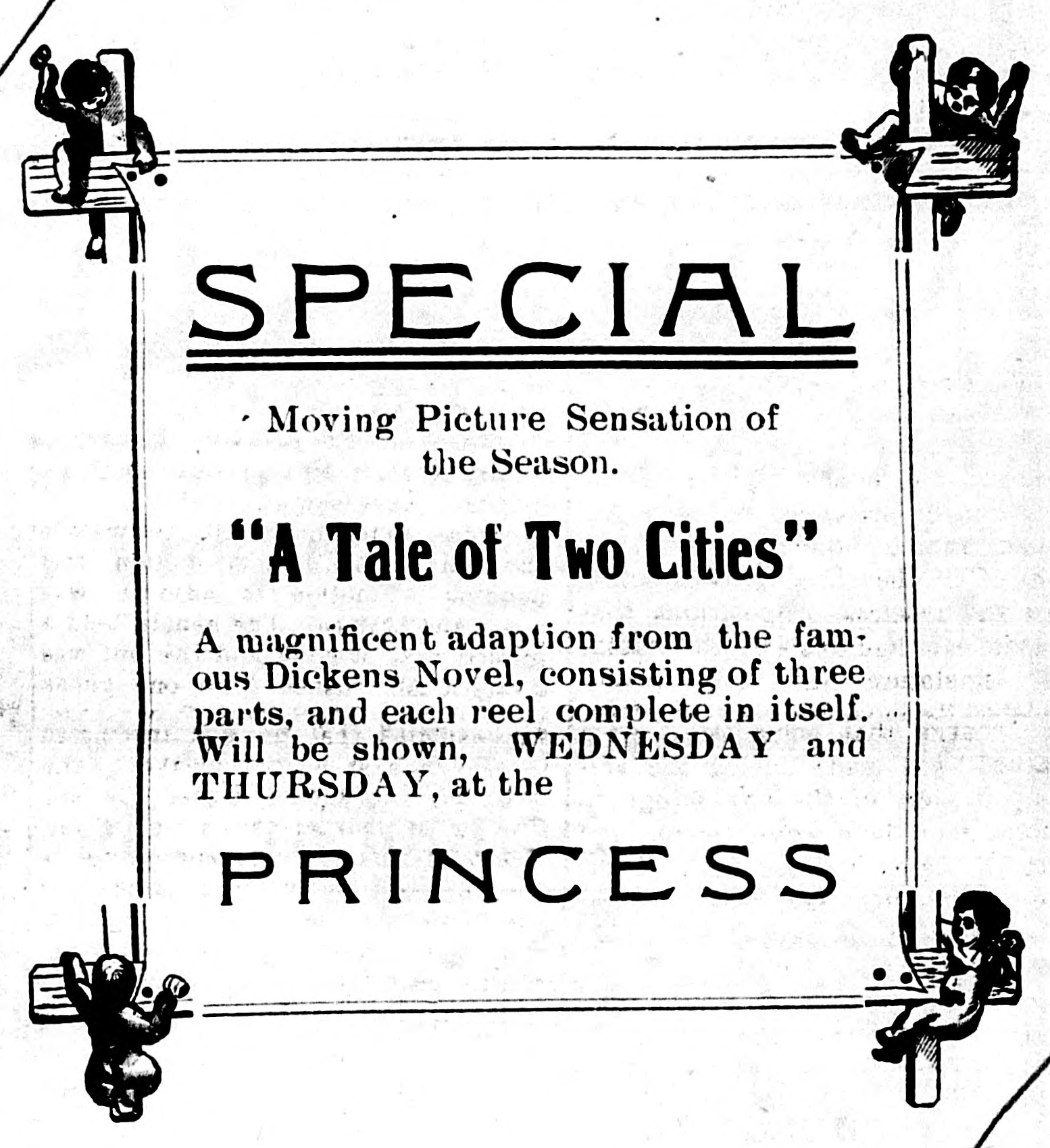
- Newspaper advertisement.
- Directed by: William J. Humphrey
- Written by: Eugene Mullin (scenario)
- Based on: A Tale of Two Cities; 1859 novel by Charles Dickens
- Produced by: J. Stuart Blackton
- Starring: Maurice Costello; Florence Turner; Charles Kent
- Production company: Vitagraph Studios
- Distributed by: General Film Company
- Release dates: February 21, 1911 (reel 1); February 24, 1911 (reel 2); February 25, 1911 (reel 3)
- Running time: 30 minutes
- Country: United States
- Language: Silent (English intertitles)

Reels two and three of the film

A Tale of Two Cities is a 1911 silent film produced by Vitagraph Studios, loosely based on the 1859 novel by Charles Dickens.

== Cast ==
- Maurice Costello as Sydney Carton
- Florence Turner as Lucie Manette
- John Bunny
- Norma Talmadge as The Seamstress (Note: Talmadge's performance as the unnamed seamstress who accompanies Sydney Carton to the guillotine was the first role that brought her to public attention. According to the early film historian Terry Ramsaye, A Tale of Two Cities is sometimes cited as Talmadge's first screen appearance due to the film's "forceful character", although she appeared in several earlier films such as The Household Pest and The First Violin. For an extended account of her role, see Talmadge 1924, pp. 98–106.)
- William J. Humphrey as The Duke D'Evremonde
- Florence Foley as The Woodcutter's Child
- Kenneth Casey as Duke's Son
- Ralph Ince
- James W. Morrison as Peasant Brother
- Julia Swayne Gordon
- Charles Kent as Dr. Manette
- Tefft Johnson
- Leo Delaney as Darnay
- William Shea as Jarvis Lorry
- Mabel Normand
- Earle Williams
- Edith Storey
- Lillian Walker as Peasant Sister
- Helen Gardner
- Dorothy Kelly
- Edwin R. Phillips
- Eleanor Radinoff
- Anita Stewart
- Lydia Yeamans Titus

== Release and reception ==
The film's three reels were respectively released on February 21, 24, and 25, 1911. Many film exhibitors at this time were hesitant to screen pictures of more than one reel, believing that audiences would not tolerate anything longer. The Moving Picture World, however, called for all three reels of A Tale of Two Cities to be screened back-to-back, which possibly inspired Vitagraph to issue its future multi-reel pictures as a single release.

According to The Moving Picture World, the staging of the first reel "is little short of sumptuous. There is shown a care in the attention to details which stamps the picture as an unusually faithful reproduction and affords opportunity for those who have read and loved Dickens in the books to see his story move before them, much, perhaps, as it moved before him during its composition." The magazine later listed A Tale of Two Cities among a group of films that adapted classic subjects, positing that these adaptations represented an upward trend of artistic quality in the film industry.

The director Rex Ingram wrote in 1922: "In 1913, when I was studying drawings and sculpture at the Yale School of Fine Arts, a motion picture play, founded upon Charles Dickens' famous story A Tale of Two Cities, came to New Haven. It followed in the wake of many cut and dried one-reel subjects, and while this picture was necessarily full of imperfections, common to all pioneer films, it marked a tremendous step ahead in the making of them...I left the theatre greatly impressed; absolutely convinced that it would be through the medium of the film play, to the production of which the laws that govern the fine arts had been applied, that a universal understanding and appreciation of art finally would be reached."

Due to the film's enormous success, Vitagraph reissued A Tale of Two Cities in 1913.

== Survival status ==
Only reels two and three of the film survive.

== See also ==
- Vanity Fair (1911 film), another three-reel book adaptation by Vitagraph
