= Mills of the Gods =

Mills of the Gods may refer to

- The mills of the gods, a proverbial expression that originated in Ancient Greece
- The Mills of the Gods, a 1912 film directed by Ralph Ince
- Mills of the Gods, a 1934 film directed by Roy William Neill
- The Mills of the Gods: Viet Nam, a 1965 Canadian documentary directed by Beryl Fox
