= A Reformed Santa Claus =

1911 American silent film

- Production company: Vitagraph Company of America
- Distributed by: General Film Company
- Release date: December 22, 1911 (U.S.)
- Country: United States

A Reformed Santa Claus is a 1911 American silent black-and-white family-drama film starring Charles Kent and Helen Gardner.

== Cast ==
- Charles Kent as Harrison
- Helen Gardner as The Widow
- Dolores Costello as The Widow's 1st Child
- Helene Costello as The Widow's 2nd Child
- George Stewart
- Alec B. Francis
- Leo Delaney
- Charles Eldridge
