= The Strange Story of Sylvia Gray =

- Directed by: Charles L. Gaskill
- Written by: Charles L. Gaskill
- Starring: Helen Gardner; Charles Kent; Mary Charleson
- Production company: Vitagraph
- Release date: October 26, 1914 (US)
- Running time: 4 reels
- Country: United States
- Language: English

The Strange Story of Sylvia Gray is a 1914 American silent film written and directed by Charles L. Gaskill and stars Helen Gardner, Charles Kent and Mary Charleson.

== Plot ==
Henry and Sylvia Gray live in poverty with their baby daughter, Silvery, and the baby's nurse, Margy. Henry is a struggling playwright, who is pinning all their financial future on the sale of his latest play. When notice comes that the play has been rejected by a manager, they are devastated. Tired of poverty, Sylvia leaves, taking Silvery and Margy with her, and goes to live with a wealthy clubman. After she leaves, but before he realizes it, another play manager arrives and pays Henry $5000 for his play. He hides the money in the wall of their apartment, then goes to tell Sylvia. When he discovers that she has deserted him, he goes out of his mind, causing him to go blind and lose his memory. He then becomes a wanderer.

Sylvia and her lover, Lennox, have moved to a different city. When she discovers that he intends to leave her for a younger woman, Lucy Reynolds, she becomes irate and kills him in a fit of anger. She is arrested, and Margy flees with Silvery. She brings the young child back to her father's apartment, but finds him gone. She decides to raise the child as her own.

Twenty years pass, and Silvery has now grown up to a beautiful young woman, who works as an artist's model. She is also in love with her artist boss, Vanveldt. Things are progressing nicely between them, until she meets a hypnotist, Dr. Frankenstein, who she begins working for on the side, much to the chagrin of his jealous wife, Vivette. Frankenstein puts Silvery under his spell, forcing her to leave Vanveldt and be with him. Meanwhile, Henry returns home from his wanderings, and coincidently so does Sylvia, who has served her time in prison. She begins to care for Henry, who still has no memory of the missing $5000. When Silvery and Frankenstein visit her parents, he learns of the missing money, and concocts a plan to steal the funds if Henry can remember where he put it. As Sylvia continues her ministrations, Henry's memory returns.

Frankenstein hypnotizes Silvery to force her to stab her father to death, and take the money. However, just as she is about to perform the dead, Vivette arrives and kills Frankenstein in a jealous rage, breaking his hold over Silvery. Released from Frankenstein's spell, she returns to Vanveldt, and the two become engaged, while Sylvia and Henry are reconciled to one another.

== Cast list ==
- Helen Gardner as Sylvia Gray/Silvery Gray
- Charles Kent as Henry Gray
- Mary Charleson as Margy
- Charles Eldridge as Uncle Adam
- Gladden James as Mr. Lennox
- Charles Dietz as Dr. Frankenstein
- Arthur H. Ashley as Vanveldt
- Evelyn Dumo as Vivette
- Phyllis Grey as Lucy Reynolds
- Edward Elkas as Mr. Cohen

== Reception ==
Variety did not like the film, calling it a "travesty". They found the plot full of absurdities, and finished their review with, ""Strange" is a mild way to describe the story of Sylvia Gray".
