= Madonna of Avenue A =

1929 film

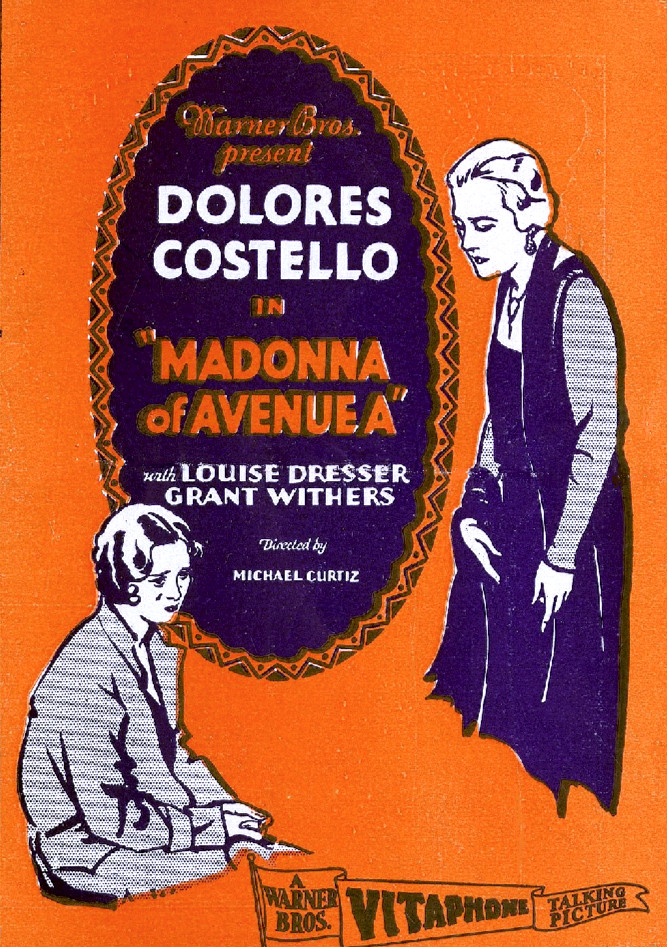
- Motion Picture Herald advertisement
- Directed by: Michael Curtiz
- Written by: Ray Doyle; Francis Powers
- Story by: "Mark Canfield" by Darryl Zanuck
- Starring: Dolores Costello; Grant Withers
- Cinematography: Byron Haskin
- Edited by: Ray Doyle
- Music by: Louis Silvers
- Production company: Warner Bros. Pictures
- Distributed by: Warner Bros. Pictures
- Release date: June 22, 1929 (US)
- Running time: 71 minutes
- Country: United States
- Languages: Sound (part-talkie); English intertitles

Madonna of Avenue A is a 1929 American sound part-talkie pre-Code drama film directed by Michael Curtiz. It was produced and distributed by Warner Bros. Pictures. It starred Dolores Costello in one of her first sound films. In addition to sequences with audible dialogue or talking sequences, the film features a synchronized musical score and sound effects along with English intertitles. According to the film review in Variety, 60 percent of the total running time featured dialogue. This film was the last "part-talkie" produced by the studio. It is now considered lost.

== Plot ==
Maria Morton is a bright, carefree young woman attending a private boarding school for girls. Despite her cheerful demeanor, a shadow hangs over her life—her mysterious mother, Georgia Morton, who visits occasionally but never allows Maria to spend vacations with her in New York. The true reason remains unknown to Maria.

One day, while walking alone on a beach, Maria notices two men following her—one a sailor, the other a rakish adventurer named Slim Shayne. Slim charms her and, claiming to be a U.S. naval officer, invites her for a moonlit ride on his boat. Eager for adventure and thinking it harmless fun, Maria accepts.

Unbeknownst to her, Slim's boat is actually a rum-runner. While he entertains her, a revenue cutter intercepts them. A gunfight breaks out; Slim escapes by diving into the sea. Maria, terrified, faints and is taken back to school—only to be promptly expelled for the scandal.

Determined to reunite with her mother, Maria travels to New York and goes to the address she has always used for correspondence. Instead of a home, she finds a dingy bird shop—and a jeering parrot mocking, “Who let you in?” The shopkeeper informs her that her mother only picks up mail there and provides a different address.

That evening, Maria enters a bustling nightclub and is stunned to discover that her mother is not the socialite she imagined, but a weary nightclub hostess. Both women are shocked by the reunion. In a private corner, Georgia confesses the truth: years ago she ran off with a lover, fell on hard times, and was forced into a life she never wanted. She vows to turn over a new leaf and sell the club.

Their conversation is interrupted by none other than Slim, who is revealed to be involved in the same criminal racket. Slim apologizes to Maria for abandoning her during the raid, but Maria is shattered by the revelation. She breaks from her mother and plunges into New York's fast life, drinking and partying with Slim. However, she quickly realizes she is not cut out for this lifestyle. Deep down, she wants something better.

Appealing to Slim's better nature, Maria begs him to change. They marry, and Slim sincerely tries to go straight, looking for honest work. Unaware of the marriage, Georgia arranges for Slim to be framed to keep him away from her daughter. One of her criminal associates, Scareface, secretly plants a gun on Slim. He is arrested and put on trial, facing serious prison time.

When Georgia learns of the marriage, she is horrified. Rushing to an underworld lawyer, she begs him to defend Slim. He demands $10,000. Unable to raise the money, Georgia takes out a life insurance policy for that amount, naming the lawyer as beneficiary. She then poisons herself so her daughter's husband may go free.

Slim is exonerated and returns to Maria, who learns of her mother's ultimate sacrifice. The reunited couple begin a new life, forever changed by Georgia's final act of love.

== Cast ==
- Dolores Costello as Maria Morton
- Grant Withers as "Slim" Shayne
- Douglas Gerrard as Arch Duke
- Louise Dresser as Georgia Morton
- Otto Hoffman as Monk
- Lee Moran as Gus
- Rhoda Cross
- Susanne Ransom as Child (uncredited)
- William Russell (uncredited)

== Music ==
The film featured a theme song entitled "My Madonna" with music by Louis Silvers and Fred Fisher and lyrics by Billy Rose. The song is introduced in reel two when Grant Withers sings the song in the moonlight accompanied by a guitar. The song is subsequently played frequently as background music by the Vitaphone orchestra throughout the film.

== Censorship ==
Like many American films of the time, Madonna of Avenue A was subject to cuts by city and state film censorship boards. In Kansas the film, with a plot involving prostitution, illegitimacy, and suicide, was banned by the Board of Review.

== See also ==
- List of early sound feature films (1926–1929)
- List of early Warner Bros. sound and talking features
