= The Doctor's Secret (1913 film) =

- Directed by: Van Dyke Brooke
- Written by: W. A. Tremayne
- Produced by: Vitagraph Company of America
- Starring: Van Dyke Brooke; Norma Talmadge; Leo Delaney
- Distributed by: General Film Company
- Release date: October 23, 1913
- Running time: short
- Country: USA
- Language: Silent..English titles

The Doctor's Secret is a 1913 silent film short directed by and starring Van Dyke Brooke with Norma Talmadge and Leo Delaney. It was produced by the Vitagraph Company of America and released by the General Film Company.

This film is lost.

== Cast ==
- Van Dyke Brooke - Dr. Von Metz
- Norma Talmadge - Elsa
- Leo Delaney -
- William Shea -
- Charles Kent - Dr. Bergmann
- Frank Mason -
- Helene Costello - Elsa, as a child
- Charles Slaten -
