= The Chattel =

1916 film by Frederick A. Thomson

The Chattel (aka:The Chattle)
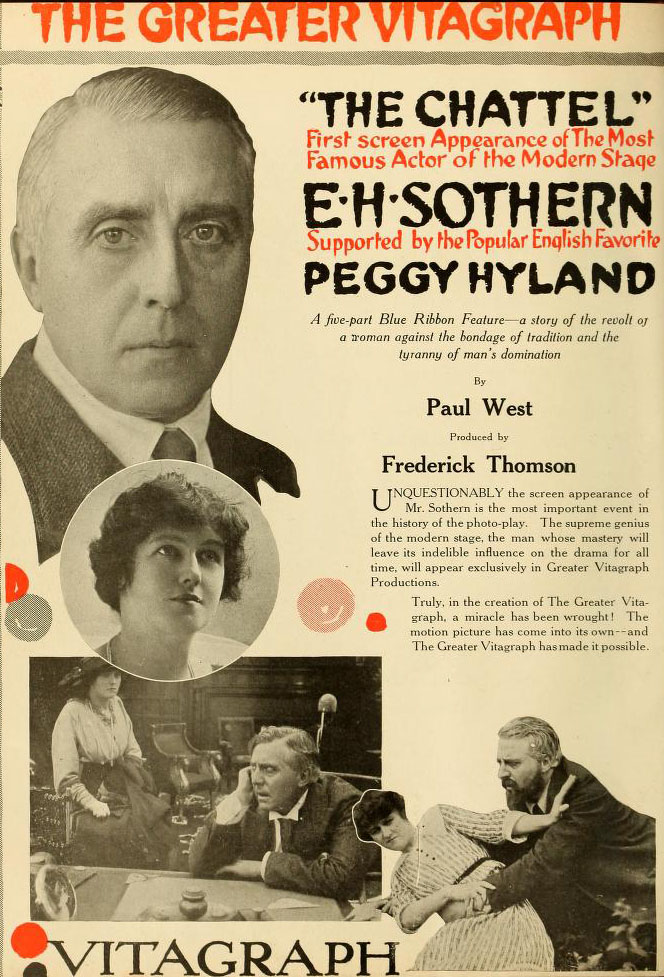
- Directed by: Frederick A. Thomson
- Written by: Paul West
- Produced by: Vitagraph Company of America
- Starring: E. H. Sothern
- Cinematography: Charles Davis
- Distributed by: V-L-S-E
- Release date: September 25, 1916
- Running time: 5 reels
- Country: USA
- Language: Silent..English titles

The Chattel is a lost 1916 silent film drama directed by Frederick A. Thomson and starring stage actor E. H. Sothern. It was produced and distributed by the Vitagraph Company of America.

== Cast ==
- E. H. Sothern - Blake Waring
- Peggy Hyland - Leila Bard
- Rose Tapley - Mrs. Delavan (*as Rose E. Tapley)
- Charles Kent - Mr. Bard
- Lark Taylor - Walter Horley
- Florence Radinoff - Maid
