= Hearts and the Highway =

1915 film

- Directed by: Wilfrid North
- Written by: Col. Jasper Ewing Brady
- Based on: novel Hearts and the Highway by Cyrus Townsend Brady c.1911
- Produced by: Vitagraph Company of America, Blue Ribbon branding
- Distributed by: V-L-S-E
- Release date: January 17, 1915
- Running time: 5 reels
- Country: USA
- Language: Silent..English titles

Hearts and the Highway is a 1915 silent film historical drama directed by Wilfrid North and produced by the Vitagraph Company of America. It is based on a novel of the same title by Cyrus Townsend Brady.

The film is now lost with no archival holdings.

== Cast ==
- Lillian Walker - Lady Katherine
- Darwin Karr - Sir Harry Richmond
- Donald Hall - King James II
- L. Rogers Lytton - Lord Jeffries
- Charles Kent - Earl of Clanaranald
- Charles Eldridge - Master Dunn
- Charles Wellesley - General Ramesey
- Anders Randolf - Chief Justice of Scotland
- Ned Finley - General Feversham
- Harry Northrup - Lord Stenwold
- William Gilson - Alison McLeod
- Rose Tapley - Dame McLeod
