= Striving for Fortune =

1926 film

- Directed by: Nat Ross
- Written by: Merle Johnson
- Produced by: Samuel Zierler
- Starring: George Walsh; Beryl Roberts; Tefft Johnson
- Production company: Excellent Pictures
- Distributed by: Excellent Pictures
- Release date: December 20, 1926
- Running time: 60 minutes
- Country: United States
- Languages: Silent; English intertitles

Striving for Fortune is a 1926 American silent drama film directed by Nat Ross and starring George Walsh, Beryl Roberts and Tefft Johnson.

== Synopsis ==
In Newport News, Virginia, a shipbuilder working on a new vessel has to thwart attempts at sabotage by a rival company.

== Cast ==
- George Walsh as Tom Sheridan
- Beryl Roberts as Hope Loring
- Tefft Johnson
- Joseph Burke
- Louise Carter
- Dexter McReynolds

== Bibliography ==
- Munden, Kenneth White. The American Film Institute Catalog of Motion Pictures Produced in the United States, Part 1. University of California Press, 1997.
