= The Child Crusoes =

1911 American silent film short

- Directed by: Van Dyke Brooke
- Written by: Marison Ziegfeld (scenario)
- Production company: Vitagraph Company of America
- Distributed by: General Film Company
- Release date: September 13, 1911 (U.S.)
- Country: United States

The Child Crusoes is a 1911 American silent black and white adventure film directed by Van Dyke Brooke, written by Marison Ziegfeld and starring Norma Talmadge, and Helene and Dolores Costello.

== Cast ==
- Tefft Johnson as Captain Rhines
- Kenneth Casey as Jack - A Young Stowaway
- Adele DeGarde as May - The Captain's Daughter
- Leo Delaney
- Norma Talmadge
- Ralph Ince
- Edith Storey
- Helene Costello
- Dolores Costello
- William Shea
