= Hearts in Exile (1929 film) =

1929 film

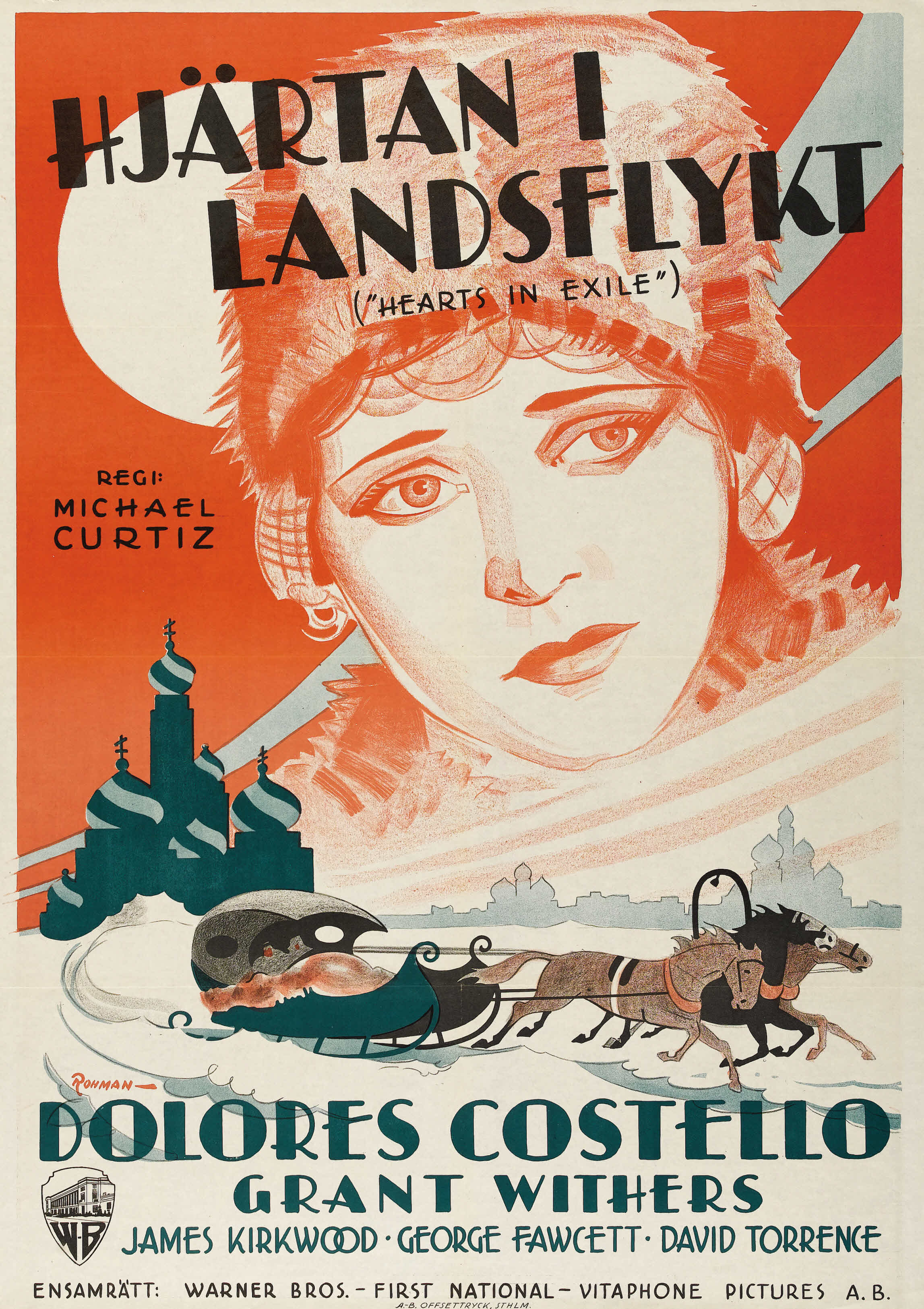
- 1929 Swedish release poster
- Directed by: Michael Curtiz
- Written by: Harvey Gates (scenario); De Leon Anthony (titles)
- Based on: Hearts in Exile (1904 novel) by John Oxenham
- Starring: Dolores Costello; Grant Withers
- Cinematography: William Rees
- Edited by: Thomas Pratt
- Music by: Cecil Copping
- Production company: Warner Bros. Pictures
- Distributed by: Warner Bros. Pictures
- Release date: September 14, 1929
- Running time: 82 minutes
- Country: United States
- Language: English
- Budget: $538,000
- Box office: $653,000

Hearts in Exile is a 1929 American pre-Code romance film produced and distributed by Warner Bros. Pictures and directed by Michael Curtiz. It was also released in a silent version with music and effects. It starred Dolores Costello in a story based on the 1904 novel by John Oxenham. An earlier 1915 film starring Clara Kimball Young was also produced, and is extant, but the 1929 version is considered to be a lost film.

== Plot ==
Vera Ivanova lives modestly in the slums of Moscow with her father, Dmitri Ivanov, a humble fish merchant. They reside above the market where they work, and they share their living quarters with a roomer, Paul Pavloff, a once-promising university student whose studies have been derailed by his drinking and gambling. Paul is in love with Vera, but she regards him only as a friend.

One day, Baron Serge Palma, a nobleman fallen on hard times due to a disputed inheritance, visits the fish market. Upon seeing Vera, he becomes immediately enamored and begins returning daily under the pretense of buying fish, just to catch glimpses of her. Eventually, he speaks to Dmitri of his feelings and is invited upstairs to formally propose marriage.

Paul, drunk and bitter, overhears the proposal from his adjoining room and erupts with jealousy. Nevertheless, Serge and Vera marry the next day, and Vera is taken to Serge's ancestral home, which he has just reclaimed through a court battle. Only now does he reveal that he delayed proposing until he had secured his rightful inheritance.

Tragedy soon strikes when a cousin of the Czar is assassinated. Serge, who is in St. Petersburg on business, is arrested and condemned to twenty years of hard labor in Siberia for alleged ties to revolutionary societies—though he had believed them to be purely educational in nature. Vera hears nothing for weeks, until officials confiscate her home in the Czar's name. Only then does she learn of Serge's fate.

Meanwhile, Paul, now arrested for his own revolutionary activities, is among a group of political prisoners also being transported to Siberia. During a rest stop, the two prisoner groups cross paths. Out of love for Vera, Paul secretly swaps places and identities with Serge, reasoning that Serge's shorter sentence and lighter punishment will increase his chances of escape and reunion with Vera.

Vera, unaware of the switch, entrusts her loyal servant Marya with her affairs and takes her young child—Serge's son—on a harrowing journey across thousands of miles by train to reach the Siberian camp where she believes Serge is imprisoned. The child dies from exposure en route.

Upon arrival, Vera is stunned to discover that the man known in the settlement as Dr. Serge Palma is actually Paul. The real Serge is being held at a camp two thousand miles closer to St. Petersburg. With winter snows halting all travel, Vera decides to maintain the pretense of being Paul's wife to protect him until spring.

She is welcomed by the local governor and learns that Paul, having finally reformed and earned a medical degree from Moscow, is the only doctor in the camp. He is living in a communal cabin with other exiles, including housekeeper Anna Reskova. Vera secures a private room in the same cabin, but keeps her distance from Paul, even though camp residents believe they are husband and wife.

When a deadly typhus outbreak hits the camp, Paul proves indispensable, even saving the governor's life. In gratitude, the governor promises him a pardon and sends the necessary recommendation to St. Petersburg.

As spring arrives and Vera prepares to leave to reunite with her real husband, she and Paul struggle with rekindled feelings. On the eve of her planned departure, they confess their enduring love and resolve to remain together.

Suddenly, Lieutenant Vinsky arrives, accompanied by two Cossack soldiers, bearing orders from St. Petersburg: the man known as Serge Palma is not to be pardoned, but transferred to a stricter prison camp. But in a shocking twist, Vinsky is revealed to be the real Baron Serge Palma. He has orchestrated this ruse to assist Paul and Vera in escaping together and has brought two confederates posing as guards.

Although his unexpected appearance creates tension between the three, they agree to leave together in a sleigh. That night, they stop at a remote inn. During the journey, Serge grows suspicious of Vera's feelings for Paul but tries to ignore them.

At the inn, Paul feigns drunkenness and announces he no longer wishes to escape. He says he prefers to return to Siberia, knowing that leaving with Vera will only cause her suffering. Serge sees through the act and, realizing the depth of Vera and Paul's love, takes a tragic but noble course: he walks outside into the snow and shoots himself, choosing to die so that the two lovers may live freely.

Just then, the governor arrives, having received a telegram clarifying the situation. Seeing the sacrifice Serge has made, he tells his men to return to the fort and allows Vera and Paul to go free, finally granting them a chance at happiness.

== Cast ==
- Dolores Costello as Vera Zuanova
- Grant Withers as Paul Pavloff
- James Kirkwood, Sr. as Baron Serge Palma
- George Fawcett as Dmitri Ivanov
- David Torrence as Governor
- Olive Tell as Anna Reskova
- Lee Moran as Professor Rooster
- Tom Dugan as Orderly
- Rose Dione as Marya
- William Irving as Rat Catcher
- Carrie Daumery as Baroness Veimar

== Music ==
The film features a theme song entitled "Like a Breath of Springtime" with lyrics by Al Dubin and music by Joseph A. Burke. Also featured was a secondary theme song entitled "Mother’s Little Sweetheart" which was composed by the same authors.

== Box office ==
According to Warner Bros the film earned $424,000 domestically and $229,000 foreign.

== See also ==
- List of lost films
- List of early sound feature films (1926–1929)
- List of early Warner Bros. sound and talking features
