= As You Like It (1912 film) =

1912 film

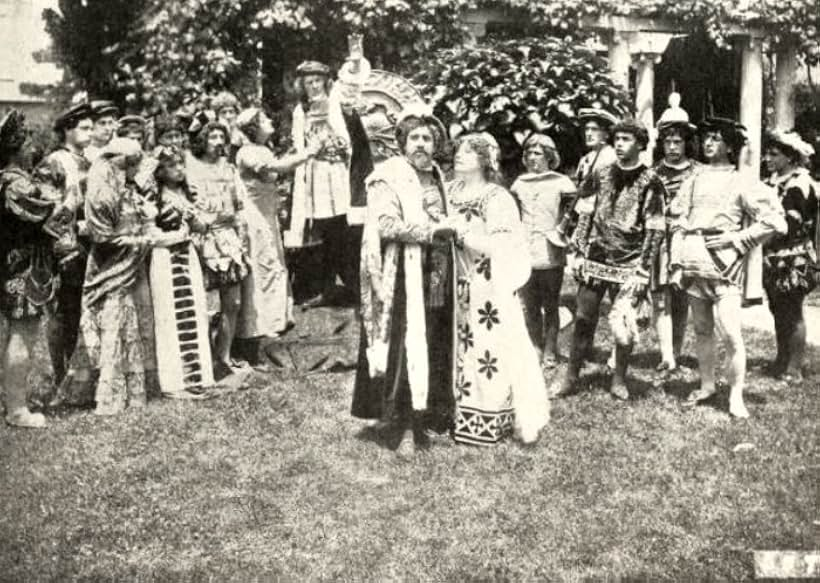
- Directed by: Charles Kent; J. Stuart Blackton; James Young
- Based on: As You Like It by William Shakespeare
- Produced by: Kenean Buel; Charles Kent; J. Stuart Blackton
- Starring: Maurice Costello; Rose Coghlan
- Production company: Vitagraph Company of America
- Distributed by: General Film Company
- Release date: October 7, 1912
- Running time: 3 reels
- Country: United States
- Language: Silent (English intertitles)

As You Like It is a 1912 American silent film based on the play of the same name by William Shakespeare. It was directed by J. Stuart Blackton, Charles Kent, and James Young, and was produced by the Vitagraph Company. The film brings stage star Rose Coghlan to the screen to costar alongside Maurice Costello. At 61 or 62 Coghlan is an older Rosalind than usual.

== Cast ==
- Maurice Costello as Orlando
- Rose Coghlan as Rosalind
- Rosemary Theby as Celia
- Rose Tapley as Phoebe, a Shepherdess
- Kate Price as Audrey
- Harry T. Morey as Duke Frederick
- Tefft Johnson as Exiled Duke
- Charles Kent as Jacques
- Frank Currier as Undetermined Role
- George Ober as Adam
- George Randolph as Charles the Wrestler (as George C. Randolph)
- Robert Gaillard as Oliver
- James Young as Sir Rowland De Bois
- William Shea as Undetermined Role
- James Morrison as Silvius Shepherd
- Frank Mason as Amiens
- Hughie Mack as William (Billed as Hugh McGowan)
- Leo Delaney as Jacques De Bois
- Robert McWade, Sr. as Touchstone, a Jester *(McWade (1835–1913) was the father of better known Robert McWade b.1872)
- Charles Eldridge as Corin, a Shepherd

== Preservation status ==
A print of this film survives in 16 mm format.
