= Dolores Costello =

American actress (1903–1979)

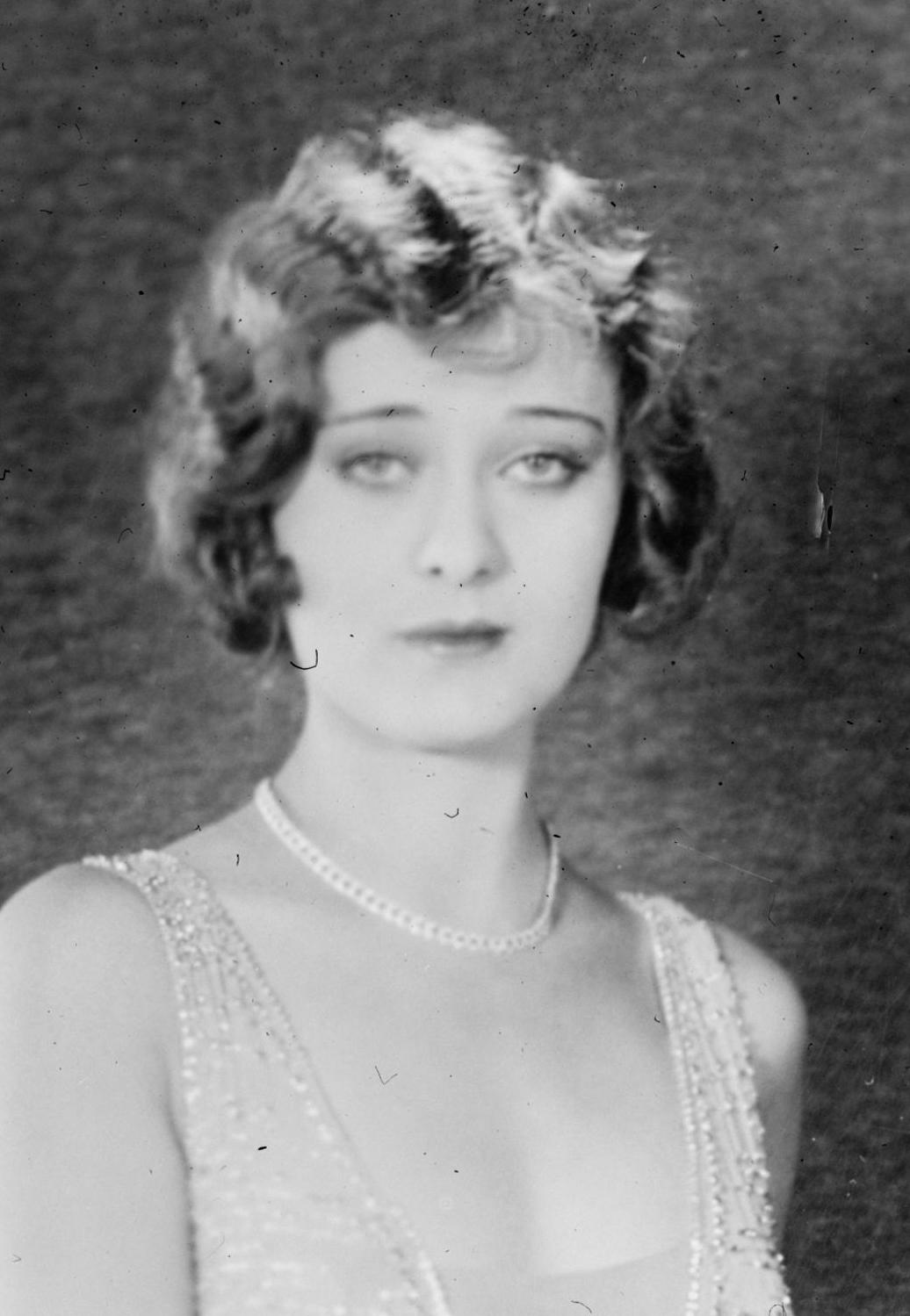
- Costello in 1926
- Born: September 17, 1903; Pittsburgh, Pennsylvania, U.S.
- Died: March 1, 1979 (aged 75); Fallbrook, California, U.S.
- Resting place: Calvary Cemetery (East Los Angeles, California)
- Occupation: Actress
- Years active: 1909–1943
- Spouses: John Barrymore (m. 1928; div. 1934) John Vruwink (m. 1939; div. 1950)
- Children: 2, including John
- Parent(s): Maurice Costello; Mae Costello
- Relatives: Helene Costello (sister); John Blyth Barrymore (grandson); Drew Barrymore (granddaughter)

Dolores Costello (September 17, 1903 – March 1, 1979) (Note: Costello's obituary in The New York Times says that she was born on September 17, 1905.) was an American film actress who achieved her greatest success during the era of silent movies. She was nicknamed "The Goddess of the Silent Screen" by her first husband, the actor John Barrymore. She was the mother of John Drew Barrymore and grandmother of actress and talk show host Drew Barrymore.

== Early years ==
Dolores Costello was born in Pittsburgh, Pennsylvania, the daughter of actors Maurice Costello and Mae Costello (née Altschuh). She was of Irish and German descent. She had a younger sister, Helene, and the two made their early film appearances from 1909 to 1915 as child actresses for the Vitagraph Film Company. They played supporting roles in several films starring their father, who was a popular matinee idol at the time.

== Film career ==
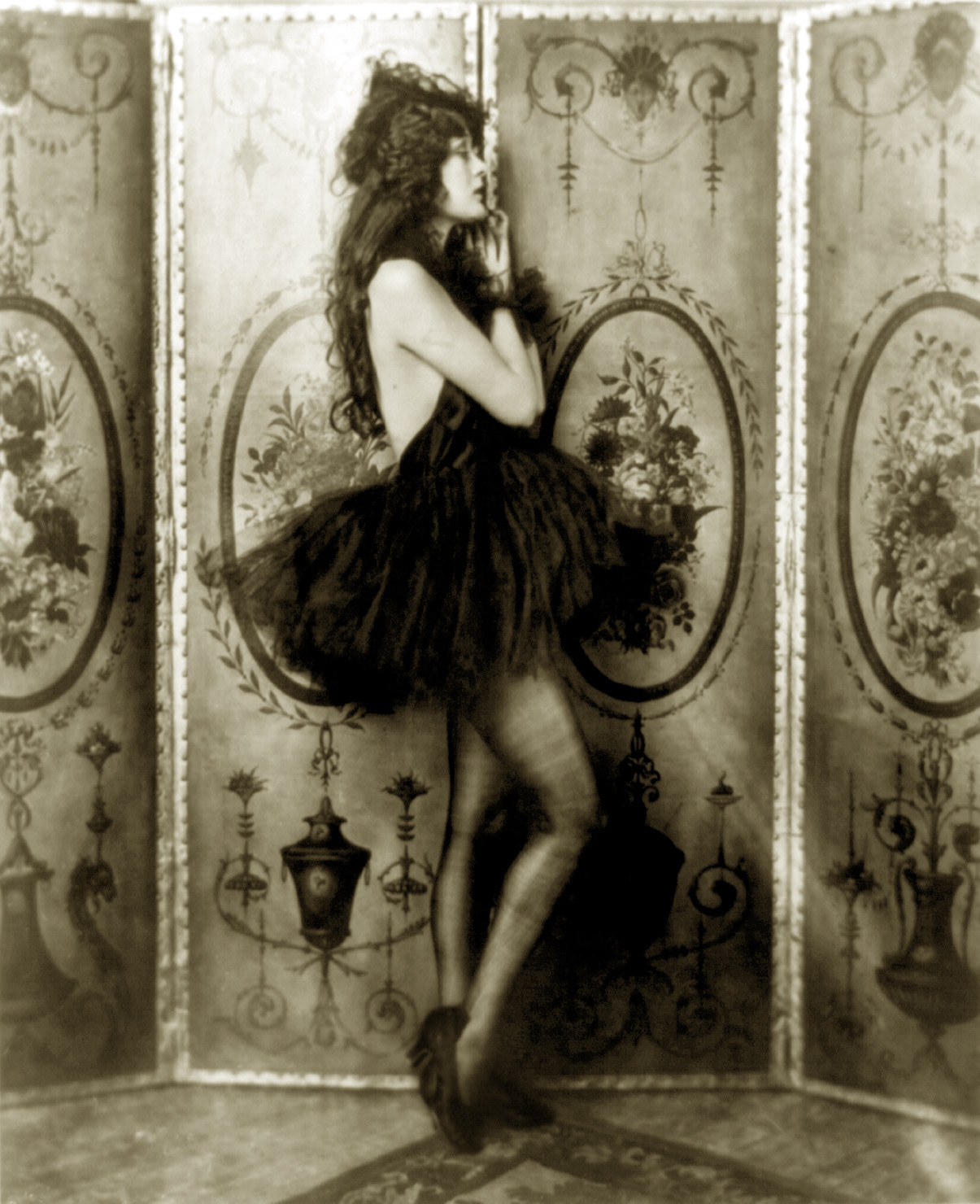
Costello, age 20, as a Ziegfeld girl, c. 1923

A few scenes of Dolores Costello acting in the 1927 silent film Old San Francisco.

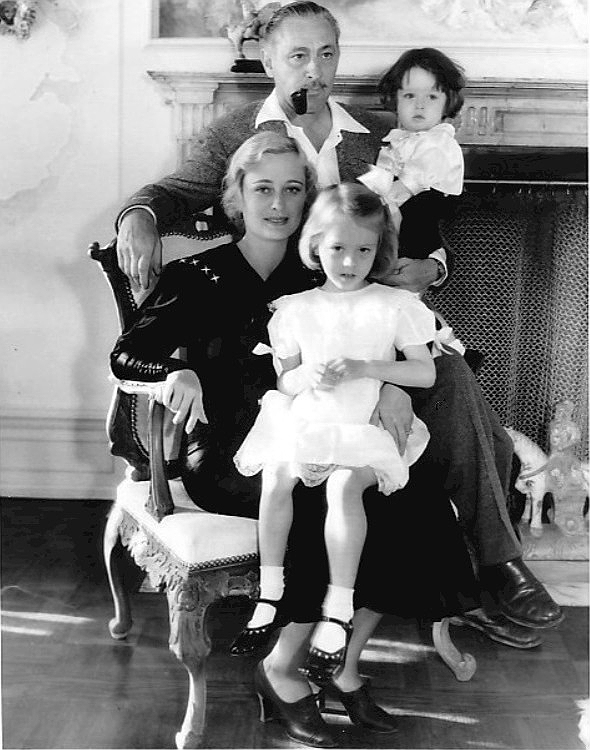
Costello with husband John Barrymore and their children, John Drew and Dolores, 1934

The two sisters appeared on Broadway together as chorus line dancers, and their success resulted in contracts with Warner Bros. Pictures. In 1926, following small parts in feature films, Dolores Costello was selected by John Barrymore to star with him in The Sea Beast, a loose adaptation of Herman Melville's Moby-Dick, after which Warner soon began starring her in her own vehicles. Meanwhile, she and Barrymore became involved romantically, and married in 1928.

Within a few years of achieving stardom, Costello had become a film personality in her own right. As a young adult, her career developed to the degree that in 1926, she was named a WAMPAS Baby Star, and had acquired the nickname "The Goddess of the Silver Screen".

Warners alternated Costello between films with contemporary settings and elaborate costume dramas. In 1927, she was re-teamed with John Barrymore in When a Man Loves, an adaptation of Manon Lescaut. In 1928, she co-starred with George O'Brien in Noah's Ark, a part-talkie epic directed by Michael Curtiz.

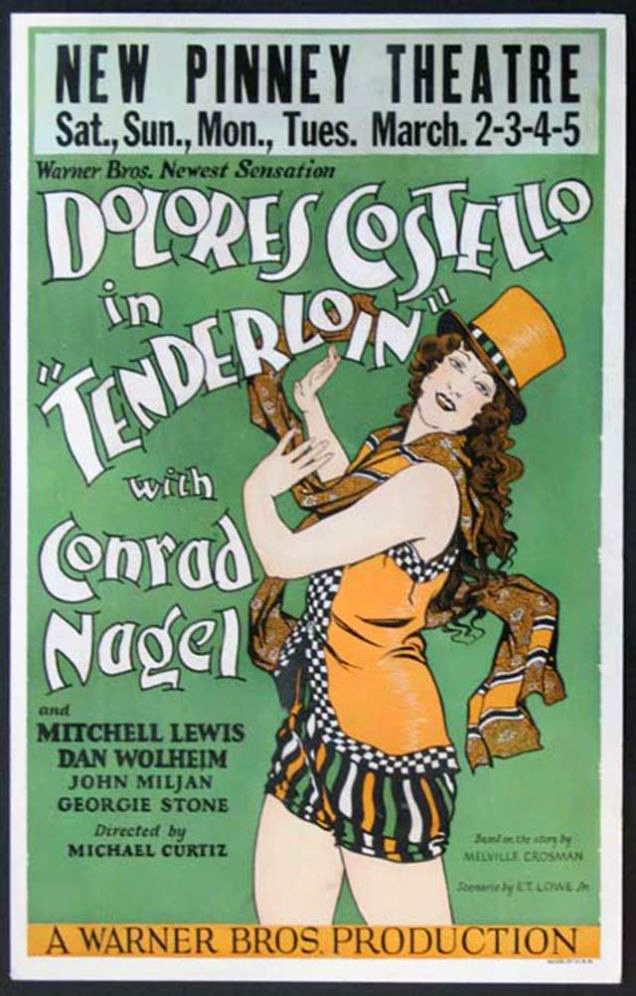
Theater poster for Tenderloin (1928) starring Dolores Costello

Costello spoke with a lisp and found it difficult to make the transition to talking pictures, but after two years of voice coaching she was comfortable speaking before a microphone. One of her early sound film appearances was with her sister Helene in the Warner Bros. all-star extravaganza The Show of Shows (1929).

Her acting career became less of a priority for her following the birth of her first child, Dolores Ethel Mae "DeeDee" Barrymore, on April 8, 1930, and she retired from the screen in 1931 to devote time to her family. Her second child, John Drew Barrymore, was born on June 4, 1932, but the marriage proved difficult due to her husband's increasing alcoholism, and they divorced in 1935.

She resumed her career a year later and achieved some successes, most notably in Little Lord Fauntleroy (1936), and The Magnificent Ambersons (1942). She retired permanently from acting following her appearance in This Is the Army (1943), again under the direction of Michael Curtiz.

Making a rare radio appearance, Costello appeared as the Danish Countess Elsa on the radio program Suspense on August 28, 1943. The title of the episode was The King's Birthday, written by Corporal Leonard Pellitier, U.S. Army.

== Later years ==
Costello's final film was This Is the Army (1943). The destructive effects of early film makeup, which affected her complexion too severely to camouflage, is blamed for the end of her film career. In 1939, she married Dr. John Vruwink, an obstetrician who was her physician during her pregnancies; they divorced in 1950. She died of emphysema in California in early March 1979 at age 75. Costello has a star on the Hollywood Walk of Fame for her contributions to motion pictures at 1645 Vine Street.

== Filmography ==
=== Child roles ===
Costello appeared as a child actress in many films made from 1909 to 1915. Among them are:

Year	Film	Source
1909	A Midsummer Night's Dream	
1910	The Telephone	
1911	Consuming Love, or St. Valentine's Day in Greenaway Land a Geranium	
1911	The Child Crusoes	
1911	His Sister's Children	
1911	A Reformed Santa Claus	
1911	Some Good in All	
1912	Captain Jenks' Dilemma	
1912	The Meeting of the Ways	
1912	For the Honor of the Family	
1912	She Never Knew; Lulu's Doctor	
1912	The Troublesome Step-Daughters	
1912	The Money Kings	
1912	A Juvenile Love Affair	
1912	Wanted...a Grandmother	
1912	Vultures and Doves	
1912	Her Grandchild	
1912	Captain Barnacle's Legacy	
1912	Bobby's Father	
1912	The Irony of Fate	
1912	The Toymaker	
1912	Ida's Christmas	
1913	A Birthday Gift	
1913	The Hindoo Charm	
1913	In the Shadow	
1913	Fellow Voyagers	
1914	Some Steamer Scooping	
1914	Etta of the Footlights	
1914	Too Much Burglar	
1915	The Evil Men Do	

=== Adult roles ===
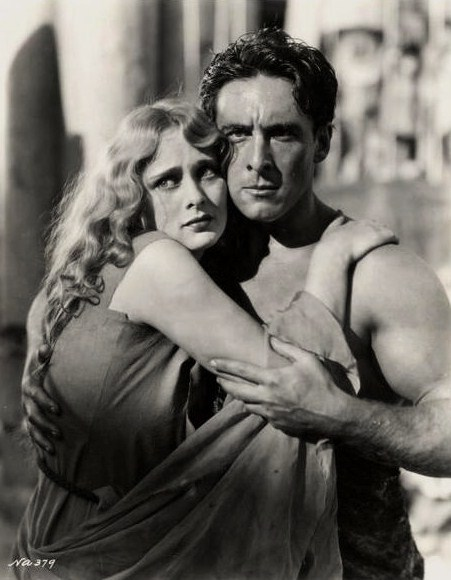
Costello and George O'Brien in Noah's Ark (1928)

She restarted her movie career in 1923 after spending several years modeling in New York.

Year	Film	Role	Director	Notes
1923	The Glimpses of the Moon	bit part	Allan Dwan	Lost film
1923	Lawful Larceny	Nora the maid	Allan Dwan	Lost film
1925	Greater Than a Crown	Isabel Frances / Princess of Lividia	Roy William Neill	
1925	Bobbed Hair	Bit part	Alan Crosland	
1926	Mannequin	Joan Herrick	James Cruze	
1926	The Sea Beast	Esther Harper	Millard Webb	
1926	Bride of the Storm	Faith Fitzhugh	J. Stuart Blackton	Lost film
1926	The Little Irish Girl	Dot Walker	Roy Del Ruth	
1926	The Third Degree	Annie Daly	Michael Curtiz	A copy is preserved at the Library of Congress
1927	When a Man Loves	Manon Lescaut	Alan Crosland	
1927	A Million Bid	Dorothy Gordon	Michael Curtiz	An incomplete copy is held at the Library of Congress with Italian intertitles
1927	Old San Francisco	Dolores Vasquez	Alan Crosland	Copies held at the Library of Congress, George Eastman House and Wisconsin Center for Film and Theater Research
1927	The Heart of Maryland	Maryland Calvert	Lloyd Bacon	An incomplete copy is held at the Library of Congress
1927	The College Widow	Jane Witherspoon	Archie Mayo	Lost film
1928	Tenderloin	Rose Shannon	Michael Curtiz	Lost film
1928	Glorious Betsy	Betsy Patterson	Alan Crosland	Preserved at the Library of Congress, while its Vitaphone track survives incomplete at the UCLA Film & Television Archive
1928	Noah's Ark	Marie/Miriam	Michael Curtiz	Film survives as a partially restored 108 minute version; the original 138 minute version is lost
1929	The Redeeming Sin	Joan Billaire	Howard Bretherton	Lost film
1929	Glad Rag Doll	Annabel Lee	Michael Curtiz	Lost film Trailer survives
1929	Madonna of Avenue A	Maria Morton	Michael Curtiz	Lost film
1929	Hearts in Exile	Vera Zuanova	Michael Curtiz	Lost film
1929	The Show of Shows	Meet My Sister number	John G. Adolfi	Survives in black and white copy, fragments of color segments exist
1930	Second Choice	Vallery Grove	Howard Bretherton	Lost film
1931	Expensive Women	Constance "Connie" Newton	Hobart Henley	Preserved at the Library of Congress
1936	Little Lord Fauntleroy	"Dearest" Erroll	John Cromwell	
1936	Yours for the Asking	Lucille Sutton	Alexander Hall	
1938	The Beloved Brat	Helen Cosgrove	Arthur Lubin	
1938	Breaking the Ice	Martha Martin	Edward F. Cline	
1939	King of the Turf	Eve Barnes	Alfred E. Green	
1939	Whispering Enemies	Laura Crandall	Lewis D. Collins	
1939	Outside These Walls	Margaret Bronson	Ray McCarey	
1942	The Magnificent Ambersons	Isabel	Orson Welles	
1943	This Is the Army	Mrs. Davidson	Michael Curtiz	
1980	Hollywood: A Celebration of the American Silent Film	Herself		her scenes broadcast posthumously
