= Leo Delaney =

American actor (1885–1920)

- Born: March 15, 1885; Swanton, Vermont, US
- Died: February 4, 1920 (aged 34); New York City, US
- Occupation: Film actor
- Years active: 1907-1920

Leo Delaney (1879 or 1885–1920) was an American stage and silent film actor. He was born in Vermont and died in New York City, a victim of pneumonia. A popular early film actor, he began in 1907 with the Vitagraph Company in New York and spent the majority of his career with them.

== Select filmography ==
- Foul Play; or, A False Friend (1907) short
- The Wrong Flat; or, A Comedy of Errors (1907) short
- Launcelot and Elaine (1909) short
- Rose Leaves (1910) short
- Ransomed; or, A Prisoner of War (1910) short
- The Telephone (1910) short
- Jean Goes Fishing (1910) short
- Love, Luck and Gasoline (1910) short
- A Tin-Type Romance (1910) short
- Jean Rescues (1911) short
- The League of Mercy (1911) short
- A Tale of Two Cities (1911) short
- Betty Becoming a Maid (1911) short
- Proving His Love; or, The Ruse of a Beautiful Woman (1911) short
- The Stumbling Block (1911) short
- Tested by the Flag (1911) short
- Cherry Blossoms (1911) short
- The Child Crusoes (1911) short
- By Woman's Wit (1911) short
- In the Philippines; or, By the Campfire's Flicker (1911) short
- The Answer of the Roses (1911) short
- The Cabin Boy (1911) short
- Madge of the Mountains (1911) short
- Their Charming Mama (1911) short
- Vanity Fair (1911) short
- A Reformed Santa Claus (1911) short
- Testing His Courage (1911) short
- The Meeting of the Ways (1912) short
- Love Will Find a Way (1912) short
- Where the Money Went (1912) short
- Her Boy (1912) short
- The Love of John Ruskin (1912) short
- The Governor Who Had a Heart (1912) short
- The Unknown Violinist (1912) short
- At Scrogginses' Corner (1912) short
- Old Love Letters (1912) short
- The Days of Terror; or, In the Reign of Terror (1912) short
- The Extension Table (1912) short
- Fate's Awful Jest (1912) short
- The Money Kings (1912) short
- A Lively Affair (1912) short
- The Light of St. Bernard (1912)
- The Adventure of the Italian Model (1912) short
- The Signal Fire (1912) short
- As You Like It (1912) short
- None But the Brave Deserve the Fair (1912) short
- Mills of the Gods (1912) short
- The Awakening of Bianca (1912) short
- Days of Terror (1912) short
- The Volunteer Strike Breakers (1913) short
- The Vengeance of Durand; or, The Two Portraits (1913) short
- The Skull (1913) short
- Just Show People (1913) short
- Mr. Ford's Temper (1913) short
- Tim Grogan's Foundling (1913) short
- O'Hara's Godchild (1913) short
- The One Good Turn (1913) short
- The Mouse and the Lion (1913) short
- O'Hara and the Youthful Prodigal (1913) short
- A Window on Washington Park (1913) short
- His Life for His Emperor (1913) short
- Bunny and the Bunny Hug (1913) short
- The Heart of Mrs. Robins (1913) short
- His Tired Uncle (1913) short
- The Silver Cigarette Case (1913) short
- Arriet's Baby (1913) short
- Solitaires (1913) short
- O'Hara as a Guardian Angel (1913) short
- Better Days (1913) short
- When Glasses Are Not Glasses (1913) short
- The Other Woman (1913) short
- Under the Daisies; or, As a Tale That Is Told (1913) short
- The Doctor's Secret (1913) short
- The Next Generation (1913) short
- Father's Hatband (1913) short
- His Silver Bachelorhood (1913) short
- An Elopement at Home (1913) short
- Fanny's Conspiracy (1913) short
- The Blue Rose (1913) short
- The Honorable Algernon (1913) short
- Officer John Donovan (1913) short
- The Vavasour Ball (1914) short
- The Slightly Worn Gown (1915) short
- The Island of Regeneration (1915)
- For Another's Crime (1915) short
- Hearts to Let (1915) short
- The Millionaire's Hundred Dollar Bill (1915) short
- The Radium Thieves (1915) short
- The Return of Maurice Donnelly (1915) short
- The Way of the Transgressor (1915) short
- Life's Yesterdays (1915) short
- The Tigress (1915) short
- Hearts Ablaze (1915) short
- The Butterfly's Lesson (1915) short
- Wasted Lives (1915) short
- The Flower of the Hills (1915) short
- The Secret Seven (1916) short
- The Surprises of an Empty Hotel (1916)
- Beaned by a Beanshooter (1916) short
- The Vital Question (1916)
- Susie Snowflake (1916)
- Whoso Findeth a Wife (1916)
- Pride and the Devil (1917)
- Love's Law (1917)
- The Slacker (1917)
- The Great Victory, Wilson or the Kaiser? The Fall of the Hohenzollerns (1919)
- False Gods (1919)
- The Moonshine Trail (1919)
- Circumstantial Evidence (1920)
- The Unseen Witness (1920)
- The Scrap of Paper (1920)
- The Wall Street Mystery (1920)
- A Flash in the Dark (1922) short (posthumous)
