= James Young (director) =

American film director (1872–1948)

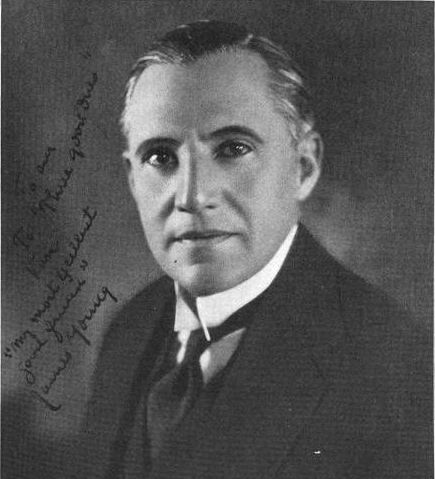
- Born: January 1, 1872; Baltimore, Maryland, U.S.
- Died: June 9, 1948 (aged 76); New York City, New York, U.S.
- Occupations: Film director; actor; screenwriter; writer
- Years active: 1905–1928
- Spouses: Rida Johnson Young (m. 1904; div. 1910) Clara Kimball Young (m. 1910; div. 1919)

James Young (January 1, 1872 – June 9, 1948) was an American film director, actor, and screenwriter of the silent era. Before films, Young had a successful career as a stage actor appearing on Broadway and throughout the country, and was the author of a notable 1905 book on theatrical makeup. Young directed more than 90 films between 1912 and 1928. He also appeared as an actor in 60 films between 1909 and 1917.

His first wife was librettist Rida Johnson Young who often composed with Victor Herbert. His second wife was film actress Clara Kimball Young, 18 years his junior, who kept his surname after they divorced.

James Young died in New York City on June 9, 1948.

== Selected filmography ==
- Twelfth Night (1910)
- Lady Godiva (1911)
- Mockery (1912)
- As You Like It (1912)
- Beau Brummel (1913)
- Jerry's Mother-In-Law (1913)
- Beauty Unadorned (1913)
- My Official Wife (1914) (director)
- The Violin of Monsieur (1914)
- The Heart of the Blue Ridge (1915)
- The Deep Purple (1915)
- Oliver Twist (1916)
- Unprotected (1916)
- On Trial (1917)
- Rose o' Paradise (1918)
- Mickey (1918)
- A Daughter of Two Worlds (1920)
- The Notorious Miss Lisle (1920)
- Curtain (1920)
- The Devil (1921)
- Without Benefit of Clergy (1921)
- The Masquerader (1922)
- The Infidel (1922)
- Omar the Tentmaker (1922)
- Ponjola (1924) co-directed with Donald Crisp
- The Unchastened Woman (1925) starring Theda Bara
- The Bells (1926)
- Driven from Home (1927)
- Midnight Rose (1928)
