= The Telephone (1910 film) =

1910 American silent film short

- Production company: Vitagraph Company of America
- Distributed by: General Film Company
- Release date: October 29, 1910
- Country: United States

The Telephone is a 1910 American silent black and white drama film produced by Vitagraph Company of America.

== Cast ==
- Leo Delaney as The Husband
- Rose Tapley as The Wife
- Dolores Costello as The Child
