= The Violin of Monsieur =

1914 silent short film

- Directed by: James Young
- Written by: William Addison Lathrop
- Starring: Clara Kimball Young
- Production company: Vitagraph Studios
- Distributed by: General Film Company
- Release date: August 1, 1914
- Running time: 20 minutes
- Country: USA
- Language: Silent..English titles

The Violin of Monsieur is a 1914 American silent short drama film directed by James Young and starring his then-wife Clara Kimball Young. It was produced by the Vitagraph Company of America and distributed by the General Film Company.

== Plot ==
According to a film magazine, "Yvonne, his daughter, and Napoleon, his dog, would creep to his side and drink in the exquisite melody of the fine old Cremona. France was then on the verge of war. An old collector hears of Pere's wonderful Cremona and offers him four thousand francs for it, which is refused. War breaks out, the Prussians capture the town and one, pushing old Pere aside, chucks little Yvonne under the chin. The old man, unable to restrain himself, smashes his precious violin over the soldier's head. Yvonne and her lover, Jean, escape, but Pere Gerome is taken prisoner. After years of suffering in the Prussian prison, he is released and revisits the little town, but does not know a soul, nor can anyone tell him where Yvonne and Jean are. At seventy, penniless and alone in the world, the poor old man is in despair, until he finds his old dog. He secures a cheap violin and one day, while playing it in a little by-street of Paris, a child smiles at him, from a window. Pere smiles back and plays' once more "The Last Rose of Summer." The old days appear to him in a vision. As the last strain quivers on the air, there before his eyes is Yvonne in the flesh, and behind her, big Jean, himself. With a prayer of joyful thanksgiving, the old man greets his loved ones, and is soon welcomed by his loved ones. Many evenings thereafter Yvonne and little Yvonne kneel by the fireside and stroke Napoleon's shaggy coat while grandpa plays the old familiar song."

== Cast ==
- Etienne Girardot - Pere Gerome
- Clara Kimball Young - Yvonne - Gerome's Daughter
- James Young - Jean - Yvonne's Sweetheart
- Helen Connelly - Little Yvonne
- Shep the Dog - Napoleon, the dog

== Preservation ==
A Save America's Treasures grant funded preservation of the film; a 35 mm print is held by George Eastman House.
