= A Midsummer Night's Dream (1909 film) =

1909 American film directed by Charles Kent and J. Stuart Blackton

- PLAY film; runtime 00:11:07
- Directed by: Charles Kent; J. Stuart Blackton (co-director)
- Written by: Eugene Mullin (scenario); William Shakespeare (play)
- Based on: A Midsummer Night's Dream; 1600 play by William Shakespeare
- Produced by: J. Stuart Blackton
- Starring: Walter Ackerman; Charles Chapman; Dolores Costello; Helene Costello
- Distributed by: Vitagraph Studios
- Release date: December 25, 1909
- Running time: 1 reel
- Country: United States
- Language: Silent film

A Midsummer Night's Dream is a 1909 American film directed by Charles Kent and J. Stuart Blackton, and starring Walter Ackerman and Charles Chapman. It was the first film adaptation of the eponymous play by William Shakespeare. The movie was made during summer 1909, but not released until December 25.

== Plot ==
The Duke of Athens decrees that Hermia (Rose Tapley) shall forsake Lysander (Maurice Costello) in favour of her father's choice, Demetrius (Walter Ackerman). The lovers elope into the woods, quickly followed by Demetrius and his love, Helena (Julia Swayne Gordon).

Meanwhile, the town tradesmen rehearse a play in honour of the duke's betrothal to Hippolyta. Back in the forest, Titania, Queen of Fairies (Florence Turner), quarrels with Penelope (Clara Kimball Young), who avenges herself by sending Puck (Gladys Hulette) away with a magic herb. When dabbed on the eyes of a sleeping person, the herb shall make the "victim" fall in love with the first person to appear after awakening.

Soon, Lysander and Demetrius are smitten with the wrong women, and Titania has fallen in love with Bottom, the egotistical leader of the tradesmen, whom Puck has turned into an ass (donkey). When Penelope discovers all this mischief, she lifts the spell, and the wedding of the duke and Hippolyta can proceed.

== Cast ==
- Walter Ackerman as Demetrius
- Dolores Costello as a fairy
- Helene Costello as a fairy
- Maurice Costello as Lysander
- Rose Tapley as Hermia
- Julia Swayne Gordon as Helena
- Florence Turner as Titania
- Clara Kimball Young as Penelope
- Gladys Hulette as Puck
- Elita Proctor Otis as Hippolyta
- William Humphrey
- William V. Ranous as Bottom
- William Shea as Mechanical
- Charles Chapman as Quince
- Charles Kent as Theseus
