= The Mills of the Gods (1912 film) =

1912 film by Ralph Ince

- Directed by: Ralph Ince
- Written by: George P. Dillenback (story)
- Starring: Rosemary Theby
- Distributed by: Vitagraph
- Release date: November 4, 1912
- Country: United States
- Languages: Silent; English intertitles

The Mills of the Gods is an American silent film. It was the first three-reel "feature" directed by Ralph Ince; production company Vitagraph entrusted him with this longer project after being impressed by his work on the two-reel Double Danger.

== Cast ==
- L. Rogers Lytton as Lorenzo
- Leo Delaney as Miguel
- Rosemary Theby as Giulia
- Zena Keefe as Maria, Giulia's Sister
- George Cooper as Tano, an Instrument of Lorenzo's
- Tefft Johnson as Piche, Miguel's Brother
- Adele DeGarde as Rosa, Miguel's Daughter
- Harry Northrub as DeWaldis, Giulia's Lawyer
- Evelyn Dominicus as The She-Wolf
- Mrs. Maurice Costello as The Nurse

== Release ==
The Mills of the Gods was released domestically on November 4, 1912. The novel by George P. Dillenback was reissued by Grosset & Dunlap in a hardcover printing featuring stills from the film.

The film played in Rotterdam at the Parisien Theater from January 24 to 30, 1913, followed by a run at Amsterdam's Cinema Palace from February 28 to March 6. At the same time, at least one print was working its way through New Zealand, where it played in Sydenham in late February, in Whanganui in March, and in North Otago in May.
