= A Daughter of Two Worlds =

1920 film by James Young

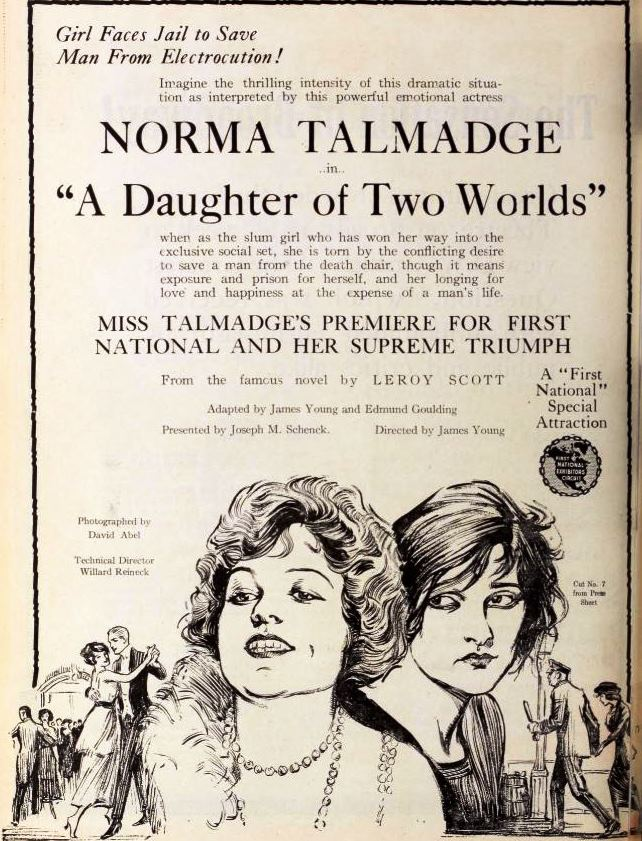
- Advertisement
- Directed by: James Young
- Written by: James L. Young; Edmund Goulding
- Based on: A Daughter of Two Worlds by Leroy Scott
- Produced by: Joseph M. Schenck; Norma Talmadge
- Starring: Norma Talmadge
- Cinematography: David Abel
- Production company: Norma Talmadge Film Corporation
- Distributed by: First National
- Release date: January 5, 1920
- Running time: 72 minutes
- Country: United States
- Language: Silent (English intertitles)

A Daughter of Two Worlds is a surviving 1920 American silent adventure drama film directed by James Young and starring Norma Talmadge, Jack Crosby, and Virginia Lee.

== Plot ==
As described in a film magazine, Jennie Malone, daughter of prominent underworld figure Black Jerry Malone, is arrested for forgery. A friend of her father's pays her bail, and she is sent to boarding school, jumping the bail. There she is educated and becomes a lady. At the home of her friend Sue Harrison, a daughter of wealth, she meets and falls in love with Kenneth Harrison, and they become engaged. Then Harry Edwards, an acquaintance and would be sweetheart of her former world, appears and urges her to return to his element. Slim Jackson, a dancer, to shield whom Jennie had shouldered the charge of forgery, seeks to collect money from her on threat of exposure. Her father thrashes the young man and bids him to leave her alone. A detective is murdered and Harry Edwards is convicted of the crime and sentenced to death. Jennie alone can save him by telling the truth that he was with her when the shot was fired. She confesses the truth to the Harrisons and saves Edwards, and then returns to her father's house to live. It is at this point the happy ending comes with the Harrisons reaching through the social barrier between them.

== Cast ==
- Norma Talmadge as Jennie Malone
- Jack Crosby as Kenneth Harrison
- Virginia Lee as Sue Harrison
- William Shea as Slim Jackson
- Frank Sheridan as Black Jerry Malone
- Joseph W. Smiley as Sam Conway
- Gilbert Rooney as Harry Edwards
- Charles Slattery as Sergeant Casey
- E. J. Ratcliffe as John Harrison
- Winifred Harris as Mrs. Harrison
- Millicent Martin as Gloria Raymon
- Ned Burton as Uncle George

== Preservation status ==
Prints are housed at the Library of Congress and the UCLA Film & Television Archive.
