= Seeing Double (1913 film) =

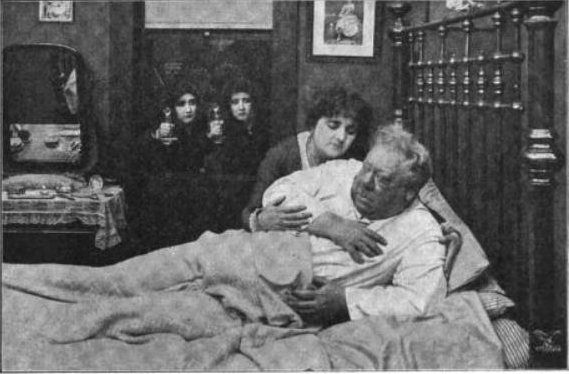
- Directed by: Wilfrid North
- Written by: Beta Breuil
- Starring: John Bunny; Rose Tapley; Edna Nash; Alice Nash; Charles Edwards; Frank Mason
- Distributed by: Vitagraph
- Release date: April 19, 1913
- Running time: 662 ft
- Country: United States
- Languages: Silent; English intertitles

Seeing Double is an American silent comedy film.

== Release ==
Seeing Double was released on April 19, 1913, in the United States, where it was released as a split-reel presentation with the documentary subject Jean and Her Family. It was released in London August 11, 1913.
