= One Can't Always Tell =

1913 film

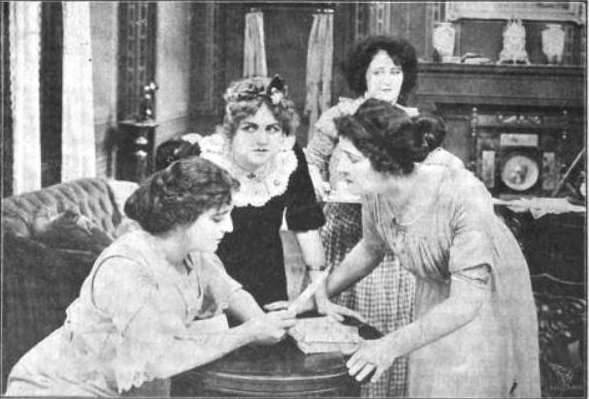
- Directed by: Van Dyke Brooke
- Written by: Marguerite Bertsch
- Starring: Mary Maurice; Kate Price; Lillian Walker; Rosemary Theby; Rose Tapley; Louise Beaudet
- Distributed by: Vitagraph
- Release date: May 31, 1913
- Running time: 613 ft
- Country: United States
- Languages: Silent; English intertitles

One Can't Always Tell is a short American silent comedy film.

== Release ==
One Can't Always Tell was released on May 31, 1913, in the United States, where it was presented as a split-reel with If Dreams Came True; or, Who'd Have Thunk It?, another Vitagraph comedy. It reached Ashland, Oregon, in July, 1913, and Ocala, Florida, in August. It was released in England on September 18, 1913, reached Christchurch, New Zealand, a month later, and Dunedin in November.
