= Isabel West =

American film actress

- Born: 1858; Unknown
- Died: July 22, 1942 (aged 83–84); Brentwood, Long Island, New York, US
- Occupation: Actress
- Years active: 1916–1925

Isabel West, also known as Isabelle West (1858 – July 22, 1942) was an American film actress in the late 1910s and early 1920s. She began her career in 1916 as Mrs. Harris in The Blue Envelope Mystery.

She died in Brentwood, Long Island, New York, US.

== Filmography ==
- The Blue Envelope Mystery (1916) as Mrs. Harris (as Isabelle West)
- Kitty MacKay (1917) as Lady Inglehart
- The Weavers of Life (1917) as Hal's Mother
- The Firing Line (1919) as Mrs. Cardross
- The Price of Possession (1921) as Mrs. Poore
- A Sainted Devil (1924) as Doña Encarnación
- Old Home Week (1925) as Mrs. Clark
