= The Surprises of an Empty Hotel =

- Directed by: Theodore Marston
- Written by: Jasper Ewing Brady
- Based on: the novel, The Princess of Copper by Archibald Clavering Gunter
- Starring: Charles Richman; Charles Eldridge; Leo Delaney
- Production company: Vitagraph
- Distributed by: General Film Company
- Release date: February 7, 1916 (US)
- Running time: 4 reels
- Country: United States
- Language: English

The Surprises of an Empty Hotel is a 1916 American silent film written by Jasper Ewing Brady, directed by Theodore Marston, and starring Charles Richman, Charles Eldridge and Leo Delaney.

== Cast list ==
- Charles Richman as Francis Trehurn Marchmont
- Leo Delaney as Charles Manders
- Charles Eldridge as Thomas Cadwallader Bennt
- William Dunn as Alfred the Count
- Robert Gaillard as Henry Barclay
- Arline Pretty as Lucie Bennt
- Ethel Corcoran as Birdie Jameson

== Production ==
Production on the film had begun by October 1915. For one of the scenes, Vitagraph blew up a motor yacht off of Staten Island in Princess Bay. The 100-foot yacht, the Wayward had been a racing yacht, having won several races in Bermuda. In early January 1916 it was announced that the picture would be released on January 10.
