= Tefft Johnson =

American actor

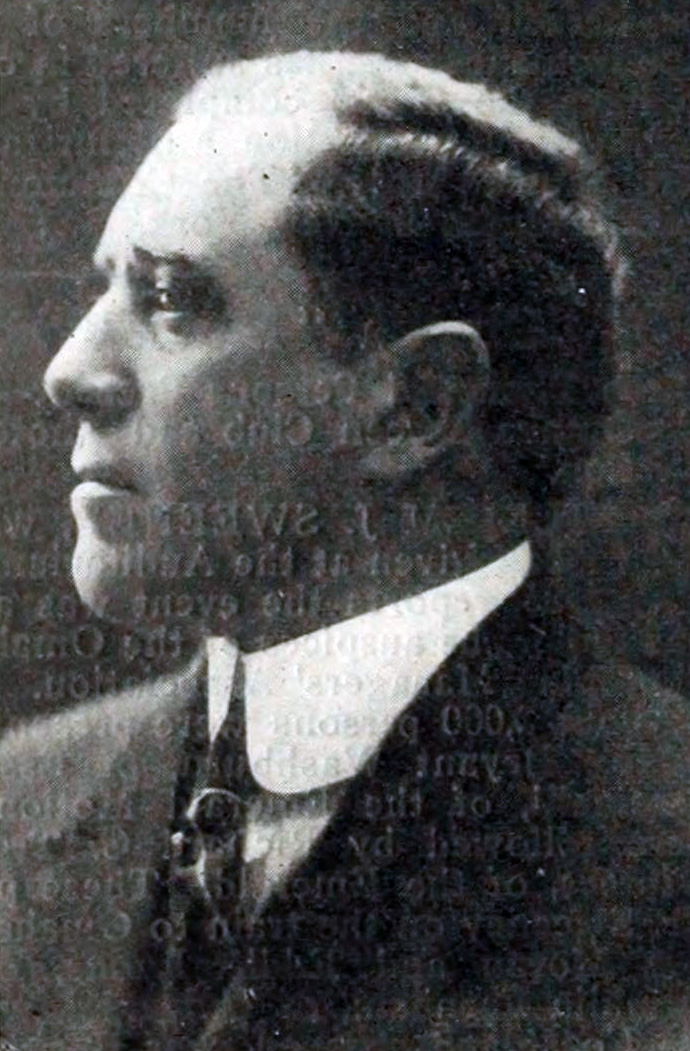
- Johnson in 1916
- Born: William Tefft Johnson, Jr. September 23, 1883; Washington, D.C., U.S.
- Died: October 15, 1956 (aged 73)
- Occupation: Actor
- Years active: 1898–1926

Sonny Jim and the Amusement Company Ltd. (Tefft Johnson, 1915). Jimmy organises a Circus at his Sunday school featuring a Buffalo Bill. Collection EYE Film Institute Netherlands.

William Tefft Johnson Jr. (September 23, 1883 – October 15, 1956), better known as Tefft Johnson, was an American stage and film actor, and film director and screenwriter. He appeared in 131 films between 1909 and 1926.

== Biography ==
Johnson was born in Washington, D.C., on September 23, 1883, to William Tefft Johnson and his wife, Anne Wheeler Johnson. He had two sisters and a brother. His father was a soldier and chaplain who was born in Cooperstown, New York in 1834. His father served in the Union Army during the American Civil War, and was wounded at the Battle of Chancellorsville. Discharged because of his wounds, his father sought and won recommission in the army. After the war, his father studied law and was admitted to practice before the D.C. and federal bar.

Johnson was already an actor, traveling across the United States, at the age of 15. His father died in 1898, and his mother in 1926. His mother largely disinherited him, leaving her $50,000 estate (which consisted primarily of a house in Washington, D.C.) to his sister, Abby. Johnson sued in 1927 to receive one-third of the estate, but a court of equity denied his claim in 1930.

After a long career on the stage, he joined the Edison Studios film company. He moved to the Vitagraph Company in 1911. He played in Vitagraph's 1911 version of Vanity Fair with John Bunny, Leo Delaney, Rose Tapley and Helen Gardner. In 1912 he appeared in the film Henry VIII as Cardinal Thomas Wolsey with co-stars Clara Kimball Young, Julia Swayne Gordon, and Hal Reid. While at Vitagraph, Johnson became a film director, helming more than 50 films. These included many of the "Sonny Jim" comedies (about a mischievous child). He also wrote three films.

In 1932, he posed as George Washington for two artistic efforts. The first was for painter Hattie Elizabeth Burdette. Johnson posed in a Masonic apron wearing the same jewel Washington himself had worn. The chair in the painting also belonged to Washington, and the pedestal and background cloth belonged to the Alexandria-Washington Lodge (which Washington had once led). The painting was used to advertise the Washington Bicentennial in 1932. The second occurred on September 17, 1932, when he portrayed Washington during a re-enactment of Washington laying the cornerstone of the United States Capitol. The cornerstone ceremony re-enactment was filmed by the Washington Bicentennial Commission.

Tefft Johnson died on October 15, 1956.

== Selected filmography ==
- Twelfth Night (1910)*short
- The Child Crusoes (1911)*short
- His Sister's Children (1911)*short
- Cardinal Wolsey (1912)*short
- As You Like It (1912)*short
- The Lion's Bride (1913)*short
- C.O.D. (1914)
- Buddy's First Call (1914)
- The Battle Cry of Peace (1915)
- Love's Law (1917)
- Home Wanted (1919)
- Striving for Fortune (1926)
