= Lillian Walker =

American actress

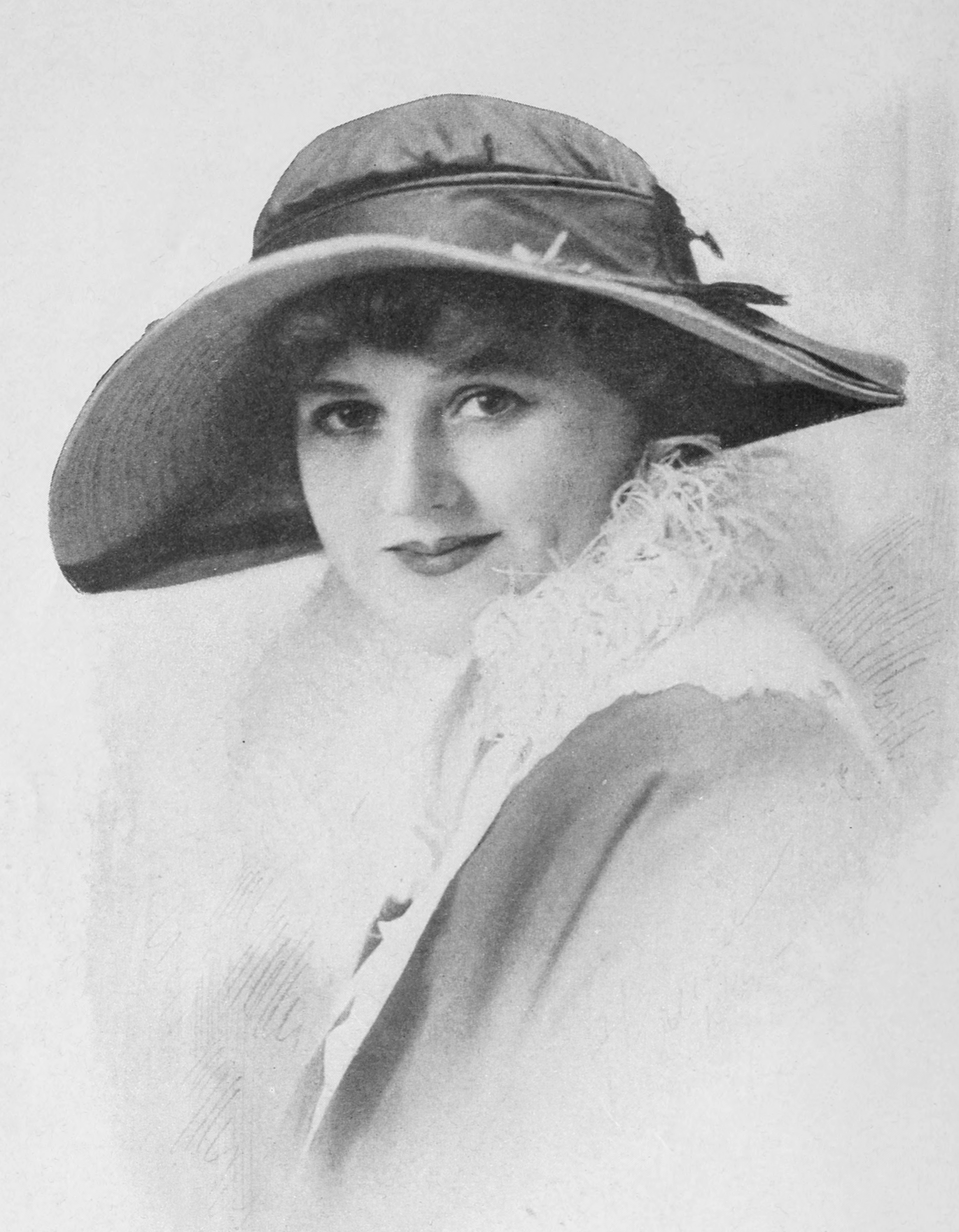
- Walker, c. 1915
- Born: April 21, 1887; Brooklyn, New York, U.S.
- Died: October 10, 1975 (aged 88); Trinidad, West Indies
- Other name: Dimples
- Occupation: Actress
- Years active: 1909–1934

Lillian Walker (April 21, 1887 – October 10, 1975), born Lillian Wolke, was an American film actress of the silent era. She appeared in more than 170 films, most of them shorts, between 1909 and 1934.

== Biography ==
Photoplay magazine's trade publication Stars of the Photoplay 1916 stated:

"Lillian Walker is a feminine confection composed of dimples, golden hair and curves. She was born in Brooklyn and as an artist's model by her beauty attracted attention and she got her opportunity on the stage. All her picture appearances have been Vitagraph productions, and she is best known for her work in Cinderella's Slipper [1915] and the "Miss Tomboy" series [1914].

In 1918, she set up her own production company, Lillian Walker Pictures Corporation, to make films in which she starred. At least one transpired, The Embarrassment of Riches (1918), released via the W. W. Hodkinson Corporation. Walker died in Trinidad in 1975.

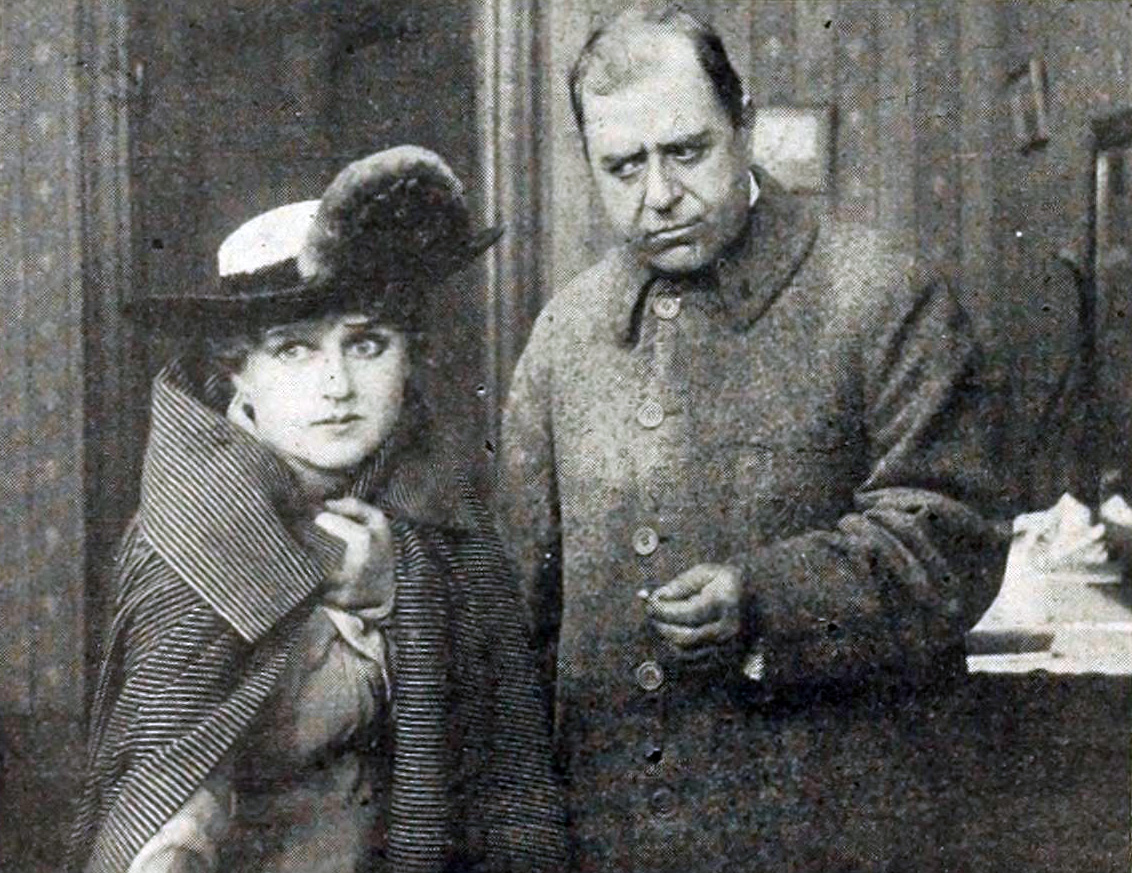
The Man Behind the Curtain (1916)

== Selected filmography ==
- C.Q.D.; or, Saved by Wireless; a True Story of the Wreck of the Republic (1909)
- Love's Awakening (1910)
- A Tale of Two Cities (1911)
- The Wild Cat Well (1911)
- A Widow Visits Springtown (1911)
- The Inherited Taint (1911)
- The Show Girl (1911)
- Teaching McFadden to Waltz (1911)
- In the Arctic Night (1911)
- The Second Honeymoon (1911)
- The Prince and the Pumps (1911)
- A Friendly Marriage (1911)
- The Willow Tree (1911)
- Cherry Blossoms (1911)
- The Tired, Absent-Minded Man (1911)
- The Wager (1911)
- By Way of Mrs. Browning (1911)
- Their Charming Mama (1911)
- The Husking Bee (1911)
- Testing His Courage (1911)
- Alma's Champion (1912)
- Caught in the Rain (1912)
- Tom Tilling's Baby (1912)
- Winning Is Losing (1912)
- The Hobo's Redemption (1912)
- Stenographers Wanted (1912)
- The Diamond Brooch (1912)
- Cinderella's Slipper (1913)
- One Can't Always Tell (1913)
- Our Wives (1913)
- Love, Luck and Gasoline (1914)
- Miss Tomboy and Freckles (1914)
- Hearts and the Highway (1915)
- Mrs. Dane's Danger (1916)
- The Man Behind the Curtain (1916)
- Indiscretion (1917)
- The Princess of Park Row (1917)
- The Embarrassment of Riches (1918)
- The Grain of Dust (1918)
- The Better Wife (1919)
- The Joyous Liar (1919)
- The Love Hunger (1919)
- A White Man's Chance (1919)
- The $1,000,000 Reward (1920)
- A Woman of No Importance (1921)
- The Woman God Changed (1921)
- Love's Boomerang (1922)
- Pusher-in-the-Face (1929)
- Broadway Gossip No. 3 (1932)
- Enlighten Thy Daughter (1934)
