= Charles Eldridge =

American actor

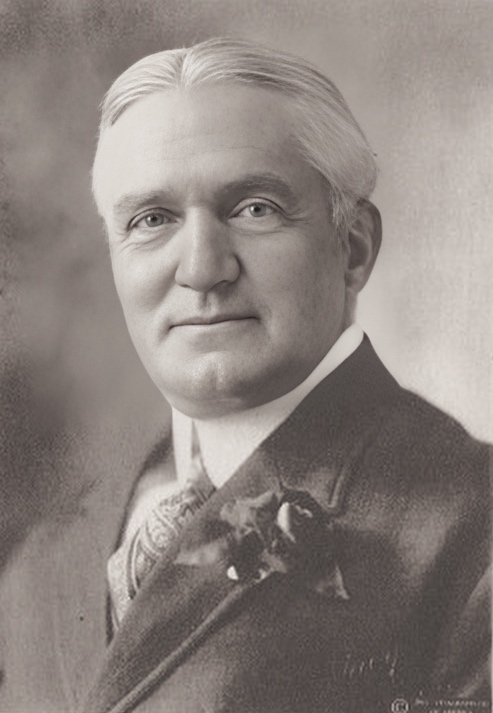
- 1911
- Born: July 25, 1854; Saratoga Springs, New York, United States
- Died: October 29, 1922 (aged 68); New York City, New York, United States
- Occupation: Actor
- Years active: 1870s–1922
- Spouse: Addie Dunant

Charles Eldridge (September 25, 1854 – October 29, 1922) was an American stage and screen actor of the late 19th and early 20th centuries.

He appeared in over 150 films, although the majority of those were film shorts. He began on the stage during the 1870s, and appeared in at least one Broadway play, Charles Frohman's 1899 production of Because She Loved Him So. His first appearance in film was in a 1910 short, The Legacy, in which he starred. His first appearance in a feature film was in The Strange Story of Sylvia Gray. In addition to the over 100 shorts he was in, Eldridge appeared in 27 feature films between 1914 and 1922. In his roles in full-length films, he would usually appear in a supporting role, although occasionally be given a lead, as in 1917's Polly of the Circus, 1920's Broken Hearts, and 1922's Ashamed of Parents. Polly of the Circus was notable for being the first film released by Goldwyn Pictures, which was shot in Fort Lee, New Jersey, mostly at rented space at the studios owned by Universal Studios.

His final screen appearance was in a supporting role in the 1922 film, No Trespassing, which starred Irene Castle of the famous dancing team, Vernon and Irene Castle. No Trespassing was released on June 11, 1922, and Eldridge died soon after, on October 29, 1922, in New York City.

Eldridge was married to actress Addie Dunant for 32 years until her death in 1914.

== Filmography ==
(Per AFI database)

- Captain Jenks' Dilemma (1912)*short
- The Cross-Roads (1912)*short
- As You Like It (1912)*short
- Bunny as a Reporter (1913)
- The Strange Story of Sylvia Gray (1914)
- Hearts and Diamonds (1914)
- The Man Who Couldn't Beat God (1915)
- The Wheels of Justice (1915)
- Crooky (1915)
- The Caveman (1915)
- Hearts and the Highway (1915)
- The Pretenders (1916)
- The Wheel of the Law (1916)
- The Surprises of an Empty Hotel (1916)
- As in a Looking Glass (1916)
- The End of the Tour (1917)
- The Duchess of Doubt (1917)
- His Father's Son (1917)
- Polly of the Circus (1917)
- The Challenge Accepted (1918)
- Eye for Eye (1918)
- The Grain of Dust (1918)
- Sunshine Nan (1918)
- Sporting Life (1918)
- Redhead (1919)
- Broken Hearts (1920)
- The Birth of a Soul (1920)
- The Woman Game (1920)
- The Gauntlet (1920)
- Made in Heaven (1921)
- Ashamed of Parents (1921)
- No Trespassing (1922)
