= Charles Kent (actor) =

British-American actor and director

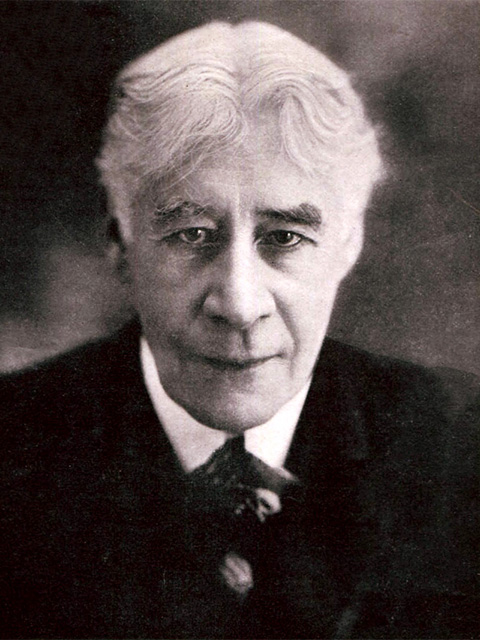
- Kent in Photoplay, 1916
- Born: 18 June 1852; London, England
- Died: 21 May 1923 (aged 70); Brooklyn, New York, U.S.
- Years active: 1878–1923

Charles Kent (18 June 1853 – 21 May 1923) was a British-American stage actor and silent film actor and director. He appeared in more than 140 films between 1908 and 1923. He also directed 36 films between 1908 and 1913.

== Personal life ==
Kent was born on 18 June, 1853 in London to Frederick Kent, an Englishman, and Martha Kent, a French woman. He came to the United States in 1875 at the age of 23, and died on May 21, 1923, after a long-lasting illness, and was buried in Evergreen Cemetery.

== Career ==
Kent was "a veteran stage actor" before he began working in films having been on stage for 50 years. He began working with Vitagraph Studios in 1908.

== Death ==
Kent died on May 21, 1923, in a hospital in Brooklyn, aged 70.

== Partial filmography ==
- Antony and Cleopatra (1908)
- Macbeth (1908)
- The Life of Moses (1909)
- A Midsummer Night's Dream (1909)
- Twelfth Night (1910)
- Jean the Match-Maker (1910)
- A Tale of Two Cities (1911)
- A Reformed Santa Claus (1911)
- As You Like It (1912)
- The Doctor's Secret (1913)
- A Florida Enchantment (1914)
- The Strange Story of Sylvia Gray (1914)
- Hearts and the Highway (1915)
- The Battle Cry of Peace (1915)
- The Tarantula (1916)
- The Chattel (1916)
- The Scarlet Runner (1916)
- The Blue Envelope Mystery (1916)
- The Enemy (1916)
- Kennedy Square (1916)
- Whom the Gods Destroy (1916)
- The Marriage Speculation (1917)
- The Money Mill (1917)
- Wild Primrose (1918)
- Tangled Lives (1918)
- Thin Ice (1919)
- Counterfeit (1919)
- The Birth of a Soul (1920)
- Man and His Woman (1920)
- The Forbidden Valley (1920)
- Human Collateral (1920)
- The Single Track (1921)
- The Charming Deceiver (1921)
- Rainbow (1921)
- The Prodigal Judge (1922)
- The Leopardess (1923)
- The Ragged Edge (1923)
- The Purple Highway (1923)
