= William Shea (actor) =

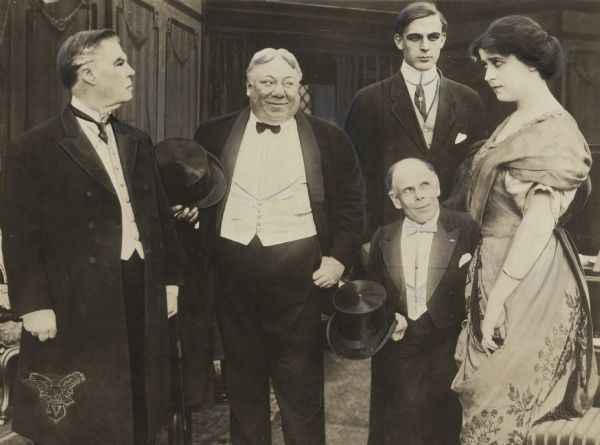
- Shea at left in Chumps (1912)
- Born: 6 October 1856; Dumfries, Scotland
- Died: 5 November 1918 (aged 62); Brooklyn, United States
- Occupation: Actor
- Years active: 1905-1918

William James O' Shea (6 October 1856 – 5 November 1918) was a Scottish-born actor. He was born in Dumfries, Scotland and was brought to the United States when he was one-year old. His father, Thomas Shea, was a civil engineer who fought with David Farragut in the Battle of New Orleans during the American Civil War.

Shea got his start acting at the age of 18 in Col. John W. Albaugh's stock company in Albany, New York. During the 1880s, he also became known as an Irish dancer and singer. He was said to be the first real actor Vitagraph ever hired, having appeared over 4,000 roles in more than one hundred films from 1905 to 1918.

Shea died of heart disease at his home on November 5, 1918. Obituaries at the time listed Shea as the oldest movie actor in the United States, although most list his age at time of death as 56 years old. Shea is buried in Holy Cross Cemetery, Brooklyn.

== Selected filmography ==
Year	Title	Role	Notes
1908	Romeo and Juliet	Peter	
1909	A Midsummer Night's Dream		
1911	A Tale of Two Cities	Jarvis Lorry	
1911	The Child Crusoes		
1912	As You Like It		
1913	The Doctor's Secret		
1914	Hearts and Diamonds	Uncle William	
1916	My Lady's Slipper	Bucknail(per Variety)	
1916	The Blue Envelope Mystery	George	
1920	A Daughter of Two Worlds	Slim Jackson	
1920	Headin' Home		
