= Eugene Mullin =

American screenwriter

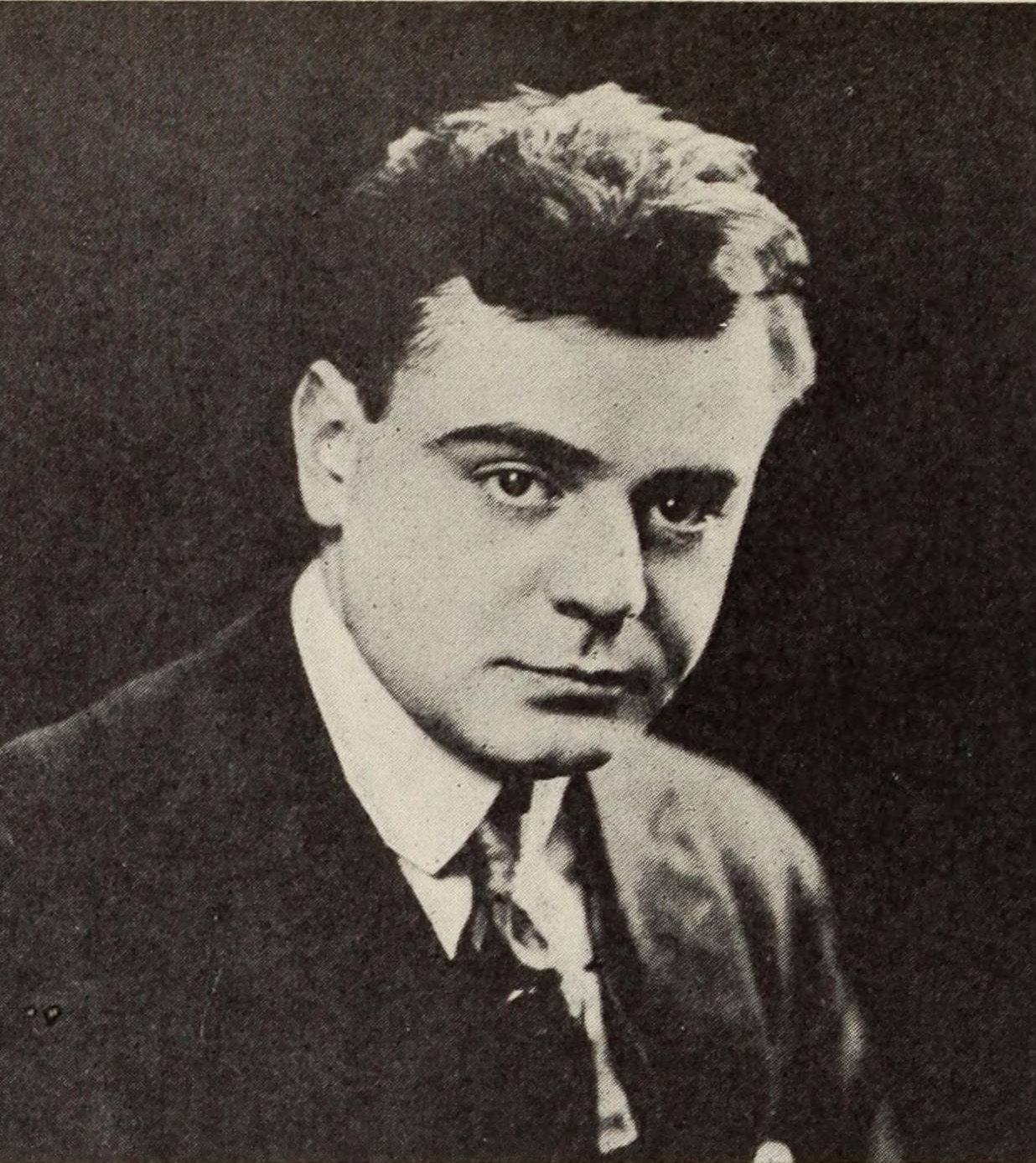
- Born: December 18, 1894; Brooklyn, New York
- Died: April 15, 1967 (aged 72); Long Island, New York
- Occupations: Screenwriter, film director
- Years active: 1909-1925

Eugene Mullin (December 18, 1894 – April 15, 1967) was an American screenwriter and film director of the silent era. He was hored by Vitagraph to write and direct. He wrote for 66 films between 1909 and 1925. He also directed seven films between 1910 and 1921. He was born in Brooklyn, New York and died in Long Island, New York.

He wrote screenplays for Heights of Hazard, On Her Wedding Night and Green Stockings.

== Partial filmography ==
- A Midsummer Night's Dream (1909)
- A Tale of Two Cities (1911)
- Lady Godiva (1911)
- The Pickwick Papers (1913)
- A Florida Enchantment (1914)
- The Bottom of the Well (1917)
- The Cambric Mask (1919)
- The Third Degree (1919)
- The Lane That Had No Turning (1922)
- Never the Twain Shall Meet (1925)
