= Helen Gardner (actress) =

American actress

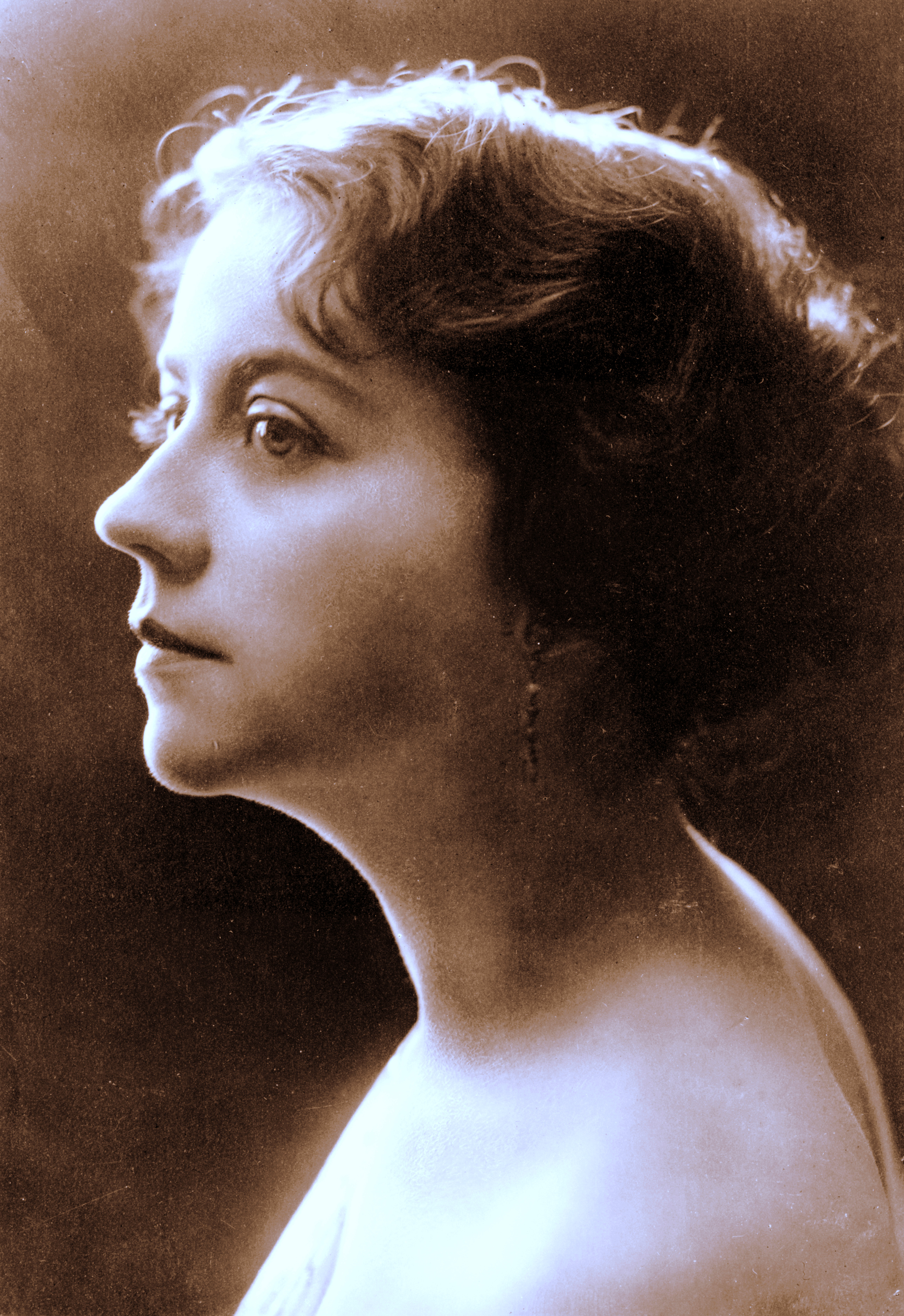
- 1911
- Born: Helen Louise Gardner; September 2, 1884; Binghamton, New York, U.S.
- Died: November 20, 1968 (aged 84); Orlando, Florida, U.S.
- Other name: Miss Gardner
- Education: American Academy of Dramatic Arts
- Occupations: Actor, film producer, screenwriter, costume designer
- Years active: 1910–1924
- Spouse(s): Duncan Clarkson Pell, Sr. (m. 1902; died 1964)
- Children: 1

Helen Louise Gardner (September 2, 1884 – November 20, 1968) was an American stage and film actress, screenwriter, film producer and costume designer. She was the first film actor to form her own production company. Her productions were primarily feature-length films, making her one of the earliest adopters of the feature film. Gardner's work was distinct for frequently centering female characters. Gardner is also considered one of the screen's first vamps.

== Career ==
Gardner was born to a wealthy family in Binghamton, New York. She spent much of her youth in European boarding schools, taking an interest in performance and often participating in private theatricals. Gardner continued pursuing theater while attending the American Academy of Dramatic Arts. After graduating, she studied under Broadway actress and playwright Maude Fulton. In 1910 she became a Vitagraph Studios player. Her breakthrough role came in 1911, when she portrayed Becky Sharp in the film version of the novel Vanity Fair. Gardner received widespread critical acclaim for her performance.

=== The Helen Gardner Picture Players ===
In 1912, following her success with Vitagraph Studios, Gardner formed her own production company: The Helen Gardner Picture Players. The company was established in Tappan, New York with capital provided by Gardner's mother. It was the first film production company to be owned by an individual actor. Gardner hired former Vitagraph collaborator Charles L. Gaskill as a director and scenarist. Gardner's first production was Cleopatra (1912), one of the first American full-length films. Following Cleopatra's success, Gardner continued to release popular films, specializing in feature-length motion pictures of at least five or six reels in length.

Gardner frequently acted in her own productions. Trained as a dancer, Gardner was known for her physically expressive performances. Her sensual, commanding portrayal of female characters was entirely new at the time, leading to her classification as the screen's first vamp, predating Theda Bara, Valeska Suratt and Louise Glaum. Beyond personal performance, Gardner's work was frequently centered on female stories. Her three most popular films — Cleopatra, A Sister to Carmen and A Daughter of Pan — all center female protagonists.

Gardner produced eleven feature films through The Helen Gardner Picture Players. In 1914, competition from better funded studios forced her to permanently close her production company. In 1915, she returned to Vitagraph briefly before signing with Universal. By this time, her popularity began to wane and she retired from acting in 1924.

== Personal life ==
Before Gardner embarked on an acting career, she married socially prominent businessman Duncan Clarkson Pell Sr., on October 16, 1902, in West Haven, Connecticut. The marriage took place shortly after Gardner's 18th birthday and one week after Pell's divorce from his first wife, Anna. Duncan and Anna Pell's divorce was covered in the gossip columns of The New York Times. The couple had one child in 1904. Gardner left Pell in 1906 to continue her acting career but they never divorced. They remained married until Pell's death in 1964.

Some sources state that Gardner married for a second time to Charles Gaskill, the director of many of her films. Gardner's granddaughter and biographer, Dorin Gardner Schumacher, states that this is incorrect and that Gardner never divorced Duncan C. Pell Sr.

== Later years and death ==
In the 1950s, Gardner returned to Orlando, Florida where she had previously lived with her estranged husband. Gardner died in Orlando on November 20, 1968, at the age of 84.

== Selected filmography ==
Short subject
Year	Title	Role	Notes
1910	How She Won Him	Muriel Hanson	
1911	A Tale of Two Cities		Uncredited
1911	The Inherited Taint	The nurse	
1911	The Wooing of Winifred	Winifred	
1911	The Show Girl	Audrey, an actress	
1911	For Her Brother's Sake	Bessie Black - the Sister	
1911	Barriers Burned Away	John's wife	
1911	A Quaker Mother	Lois Pearson Harmon - A Quaker Wife	
1911	She Came, She Saw, She Conquered	Rose Leigh - a Young Schoolteacher	
1911	The Death of King Edward III	Alice Ferrers	
1911	For Love and Glory	Rose Seaton	
1911	By Woman's Wit	The wife	
1911	Ups and Downs	The Young Wife	
1911	Regeneration	Elfie - Ross' sweetheart	
1911	Madge of the Mountains	Madge of the Mountains	
1911	Arbutus	The Mountain Woman	
1911	The Girl and the Sheriff	The Mountain Girl	
1911	Freshet	Meg Matthews	
1911	Vanity Fair	Becky Sharp	
1911	A Reformed Santa Claus	The Widow	
1912	Where the Money Went	Mrs. Fred Hart - the Jealous Wife	
1912	She Came, She Saw, She Conquered	Rose Leigh - a Young Schoolteacher	
1912	A Problem in Reduction	Mrs. Smartly - a Woman Who Wants to Reduce	
1912	Her Boy	Sue - Harry's Sweetheart	
1912	The Love of John Ruskin	The wife	
1912	The Love of John Ruskin	Mrs. John Ruskin	
1912	The Old Silver Watch		Credited as Miss Gardner
1912	The Illumination	Sabina	
1912	The Serpents	Linda	
1912	An Innocent Theft	Malcolm's mother	
1912	Yellow Bird	Song Bird, a Young Indian	
1912	The Miracle	Abbasah, the Caliph's Wife	
1912	The Heart of Esmeralda	Louise Lennox - a Novelist	
1912	The Party Dress	Lydia Borne	
1913	Becky, Becky	Becky	Writer
1913	Alixe; or, The Test of Friendship	Alixe	
1913	Eureka!	The Castaway	
1913	Vampire of the Desert	Lispeth, Vampire of the Desert	
1913	The Wife of Cain	Save - the Wife of Cain	Producer
1913	A Daughter of Pan	Dusa - a Daughter of Pan	Producer
1914	The Girl with the Hole in Her Stocking		Producer
1914	Fleur de Lys		Producer
1914	And There Was Light		Producer
1914	Butterfly	Nancy North - the Butterfly	
1914	Underneath the Paint	Tryphena Winter	
1914	The Strange Story of Sylvia Gray	Sylvia Gray/Silvery Gray	
1915	The Breath of Araby	Clothilde	
1915	The Still, Small Voice	Musa	
1915	Snatched from a Burning Death	Joan Le Grande	
1915	Miss Jekyll and Madame Hyde	Madeleine Jekyll/Madame Hyde	

Features
Year	Title	Role	Notes
1912	Cleopatra	Cleopatra - Queen of Egypt	Producer, costume designer, editor (uncredited); Credited as Miss Gardner
1913	A Sister to Carmen	Margo	Producer
1913	A Princess of Bagdad	Princess Ojira	Producer
1914	Pieces of Silver: A Story of Hearts and Souls	Sister Berenice	Producer
1914	The Strange Story of Sylvia Gray	Sylvia Gray/Silvery	
1914	The Moonshine Maid and the Man	Nancy - the Moonshine Maid	
1920	The Sleep of Cyma Roget	Cyma Roget	
1924	Sandra	La Flamme's wife	
