= Rose Tapley =

American actress

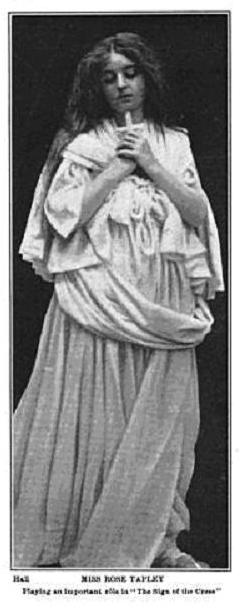
- Promotion of The Sign of the Cross in Theatre Magazine, 1904
- Born: Rose Elizabeth Tapley; June 30, 1881; Salem, Massachusetts, U.S.
- Died: February 23, 1956 (aged 74); Woodland Hills, Los Angeles, California, U.S.
- Other names: Miss Rose Tapley; Rose E. Tapley; Mother of Movies
- Education: Boston University
- Occupation: Actress
- Years active: 1900–1931
- Spouse: Frank E. Holahan (m. 1906; died 1955)
- Children: 1
- Relatives: Robert Bartlett

Rose Elizabeth Tapley (June 30, 1881 – February 23, 1956) was an American actress of the stage and an early heroine of silent films.

== Early life ==
Tapley was born in Salem, Massachusetts. She was the cousin of Captain Robert Bartlett, commander of the S.S. Roosevelt and the S.S. Karluk. All of her relatives on her father's side for generations were sailors. Her grandfather's generation included nine sailing masters or captains. Tapley's mother's name was Elizabeth Stagg Riker. She was the granddaughter of Abram Polhemus, one of the founders of the old Dutch Reformed Church in New York City. He was a merchant marine prince as a young man. Tapley was educated in the public schools of Malden, Massachusetts and at Boston University.

== Career ==
Tapley performed on stage from 1900 to 1909. Her first theatrical engagement was with the Myron B. Rice Company, as Bernice, in My Friend From India. During the season of 1900 she played every other woman's part in this play. She starred with popular actors of the era such as Richard Mansfield, Chauncey Olcott, E.H. Sothern, and J.H. Stoddard. With Mansfield, Rose acted in Beau Brummel, Monsieur Beaucaire, A Parisian Romance, and First Violin. One of her most noted roles was in The Sign of the Cross.

Her first motion picture appearance was in 1905. Tapley was featured in the Thomas Alva Edison film, Wanted a Wife. Soon after she performed in the first standard two reeler, The Money Kings. She signed a contract with the old Vitagraph Company in May 1909, making her the first leading lady of movies. She was also the first star of the stage to begin a film career. She acted with Vitagraph, Famous Players–Lasky, and for Fox Film until her retirement in 1931. Her credits number 175 films. Some of the titles are The Way of the Cross (1909), A Midsummer Night's Dream (1909), The Cave Man (1912), Every Inch A Man (1912), Seeing Double (1913), One Can't Always Tell (1913), Mr. Jarr and the Society Circus (1915), Her Majesty (1922), God's Great Wilderness (1927), His First Command (1929), and Resurrection (1931).

Tapley was frequently called the Mother of Movies. She served as official hostess at a number of motion picture expositions at different locales throughout the country. In 1916–1917 Rose toured America as a representative of the film industry. She made appearances in front of state legislatures, businesses, and women's clubs. All of this to promote interest in the quality of movies.

On Broadway, Tapley appeared in Robert Burns (1905), Zombie (1932), and Satellite (1935).

== Personal life and death ==
Tapley was married on March 20, 1906, to New York City attorney Frank E. Holahan who died in October 1955.

She died at age 74 at the Motion Picture & Television Country Home and Hospital in Woodland Hills, California, in 1956. She was survived by a daughter, Rosemary Holahan, and three sisters. Her funeral was conducted at Our Lady of the Valley Catholic Church, Canoga Park, California. She was buried at San Fernando Mission Cemetery.

== Selected filmography ==
- A Midsummer Night's Dream (1909)
- The Telephone (1910)
- A Cure for Pokeritis (1912)
- Her Choice (1912)
- As You Like It (1912)
- Seeing Double (1913)
- One Can't Always Tell (1913)
- My Official Wife (1914)
- Hearts and the Highway (1915)
- The Chattel (1916)
- Her Majesty (1922)
- Java Head (1923)
- The Man Who Fights Alone (1924)
- The Redeeming Sin (1925)
- The Scarlet Honeymoon (1925)
- The Pony Express (1925)
- The Prince of Pilsen (1926)
- Morganson's Finish (1926)
- God's Great Wilderness (1927)
- Out of the Past (1927)
- His First Command (1929)
- Paris Bound (1929)
- Resurrection (1931)
- Sex Madness (1938)
