= Mae Costello =

American actress (1882–1929)

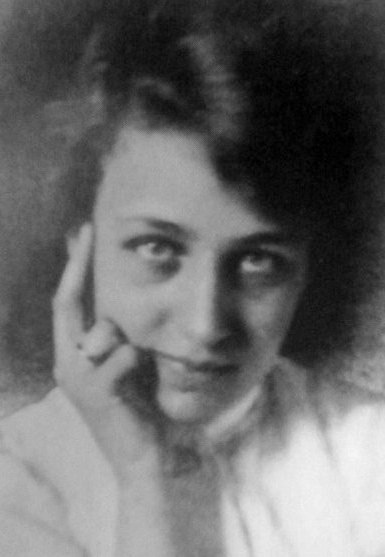
- Costello, c. 1910
- Born: Mae Altschuh; August 13, 1882; Brooklyn, New York City, U.S.
- Died: August 2, 1929 (aged 46); Los Angeles, California, U.S.
- Resting place: Calvary Cemetery, East Los Angeles
- Occupation: film actress
- Years active: 1911–1917
- Spouse: Maurice Costello (m. 1902; div. 1927)
- Children: Dolores Costello; Helene Costello

Mae Costello (born Maria Josephina Altschuh; August 13, 1882 – August 2, 1929) was an American silent film actress of the early twentieth-century who is best known as the matriarch of the Costello family of actors. She made 17 films with Vitagraph Studios between 1911 and 1917, using the name Mrs. Maurice Costello, following her marriage to actor Maurice Costello at age 19 in 1902. The couple had two daughters, the actresses Dolores Costello and Helene Costello, who both began performing in films as children for Vitagraph in 1909 where her husband was employed.

Costello's film career faltered due to the turbulent nature of her marriage; Maurice was abusive and an alcoholic. Her last film role was 1917's The Money Mill, directed by John S. Robertson. The following year, Maurice Costello abandoned the family and she was forced to pawn most of the family's possessions and sell the family house in the early 1920s. While Maurice returned and his career rebounded, the relationship to his family was never the same, and ultimately the marriage ended in divorce in 1927, two years before Mae's death of heart disease in 1929.

== Early life ==
The daughter of Lewis Altschuh and Catherine Altschuh (née Callender), Maria "Mae" Josephina Altschuh was born in Brooklyn, New York on August 13, 1882. Her father was from Alsace, France and had immigrated to the United States after German soldiers had destroyed his Alsatian vineyard. He maintained a deep-seated hatred of Germans until his death shortly after Mae was born. Her mother remarried, and she grew up in New York City in the conservative home of her step-father, the merchant Vincent Tresham. Tresham, like Mae's mother, was originally from England and was a strict devout Catholic who had a strong moral stance against the theatrical world.

== Marriage and motherhood ==
In the spring of 1902 Mae was introduced to the actor Maurice Costello by the playwright Augustus McHugh when she was 19 years old. They had a whirlwind romance which was kept secret because of her step-father's disapproval of Maurice. They married on June 6, 1902, at Holy Innocents Church. Both of Mae's parents were unhappy about the marriage as they viewed actors as immoral people. A major conflict ensued between Maurice and her step-father, which resulted in a severing of Mae's relationship with her parents.

In the early part of their marriage, Mae traveled with Maurice while he was performing on tour with the Boyle Stock Company. The struggles of adjusting from her comfortable upper-middle-class background into a life as the wife of a poor itinerant performer brought conflicts into the marriage early on; particularly as the realities of what life on the road meant became increasingly harder for Mae to bare in combination with Maurice's alcoholism. While on tour in Nashville, Tennessee she discovered she was pregnant. Unable to support Mae and their forthcoming baby, Maurice sent her to live with his mother and step-father in their boarding house in the slums of Pittsburgh, Pennsylvania. There she gave birth to her eldest daughter, Dolores Costello, on September 17, 1903.

Maurice did not meet his baby daughter until the spring of 1904. He went back on the road, but returned in mid 1904 to move Mae and Dolores into nicer premises in Harlem, New York City to be near where he was currently employed. Mae became pregnant with their second daughter, Helene Costello, not long after she moved into her Harlem home. By this time, Maurice's stage career was on an upward trajectory and his prospects both financially and professionally were improved as he began to get traction as a successful actor on the New York stage. Simultaneously he began working part time in films as an uncredited actor as was standard at that point in film history when film actors were not given billing. Maurice's identity as the leading actor in his early films was carefully hidden until 1910 when the anonymous film actor system was replaced with the cultivated movie star model.

The Costello's second daughter, Helene (originally spelled Helen), was born in New York on June 21, 1906, in what was a difficult breech birth lasting approximately sixteen hours and requiring attentions from a medical team of nurses and three doctors. Maurice, who had wanted boys and not girls, was doubly upset that not only was his second child a girl but that the complications from the pregnancy made it impossible for Mae to have more children, ending the hopes of having a son. The year after Helene's birth Maurice transitioned into working full time as a film actor for Vitagraph Studios bringing much needed financial stability to the Costello family as well as consistent employment without the difficulties of life as a gig actor. This enabled the family to purchase their first home in Brooklyn at 1769 E. 14th St. Both of their daughters began working in films as well in 1909 when Dolores was six and Helene a toddler.

== Film and fame ==
On October 5, 1910, the Costello family's life forever changed when the New York Dramatic Mirror was the first to reveal to the world the identity of Maurice Costello, the film star. This was followed by the first coordinated campaign to promote a film actor in the history of cinema in the United States, making Maurice Costello arguably America's first movie star. This impacted the entire Costello family in a way they never anticipated, as Maurice's name was suddenly being put up on marquises outside of movie theater's all across America, something that had never been done before. The rapid fame resulted in continuous deluges of fan mail, and turned Maurice into a household name across the country almost over night. Maurice's fame spread even further with the international success of A Tale of Two Cities (1911) in which he was the lead actor; making him a household name in Europe.

Her husband's rising fame led to increasing pressures on the Costello's marriage that led to a worsening relationship between Mae and Maurice. This was compounded by worsening behaviors related to Maurice's alcoholism including incidents of domestic violence in which Mae was assaulted. In an effort to please his wife and improve their marriage, Maurice advocated to Vitagraph Studios that they hire Mae to appear as an actress in films. His position as the company's big star had significant weight at Vitagraph, and they agreed to his proposal without opposition even though Mae had no experience as an actress. Her first film was Her Crowning Glory (1911) in which she portrayed the nurse.

In December 1912 the entire Costello family embarked upon a global trip around the world with Vitagraph Studios. They would not arrive back in the United States until the following June, and spent almost six months either making or supporting the making of silent films in countries around the world. A large group of actors and supporting film crew went on this trip, which included films made in China, India, Egypt, France, England, Italy, and Hawaii among other locations. At this point, Maurice was both directing and acting in films for Vitagraph and worked in both capacities on this trip. The pressures of the travel and the filming schedule further worsened the problems in the Costello's marriage, and by the time the tour reached Cairo, the couple were barely speaking to one another.

As an actress, Mae was billed as Mrs. Maurice Costello. She only worked for Vitagraph Studios during her career; making pictures through 1917. Films she made for the company included When a Woman Loves (1915, as Mrs. King), Her Right to Live (1917, as Mrs. Biggs), and The Money Mill (1917, as Mrs. King). She appeared opposite such actors as John Bunny, Flora Finch, Wallace Reid, Florence Turner, Antonio Moreno, Bobby Connelly and Clara Kimball Young, as well as her husband and daughters.

== Later life ==
The problem's in the Costello's marriage made global headlines after the Brooklyn Eagle published a news report on November 25, 1913, detailing Maurice's arraignment in a Long Island Court for beating his wife and reporting the testimony from the court room of his punching his wife, knocking her down, and kicking her in the head while under the influence of alcohol. Mae pled for a reduced sentence for her husband, and expressed her desire that all she wanted was that her husband stop drinking. The charge was suspended, and he was placed on probation. The ensuing years were increasingly unhappy ones as Maurice's alcoholism worsened, marital fights in the home increased, and eventually Maurice's career imploded. By 1918 the Costellos were destitute, Maurice had abandoned his family, and Mae and his girls had pawn most of what they had to make ends meet. They ultimately were forced to sell the family home in the early 1920s.

Mae and Maurice Costello divorced in 1927. In 1929, Mae died of heart disease and was interred at the Calvary Cemetery, East Los Angeles, California.

== Partial filmography ==
- The Money Mill - Mrs. King (1917)
- Her Right to Live - Mrs. Biggs (1917)
- When a Woman Loves - Mrs. King (1915)
- The Taming of Betty - Mrs. Cutler (1913)
- The Spirit of the Orient (1913)
- The One Good Turn (1913)
- The Mills of the Gods - The Nurse (1912)
- Diamond Cut Diamond - The Telephone Operator (1912)
- Her Crowning Glory - The Nurse (1911)
