= List of actors with Hollywood Walk of Fame motion picture stars =

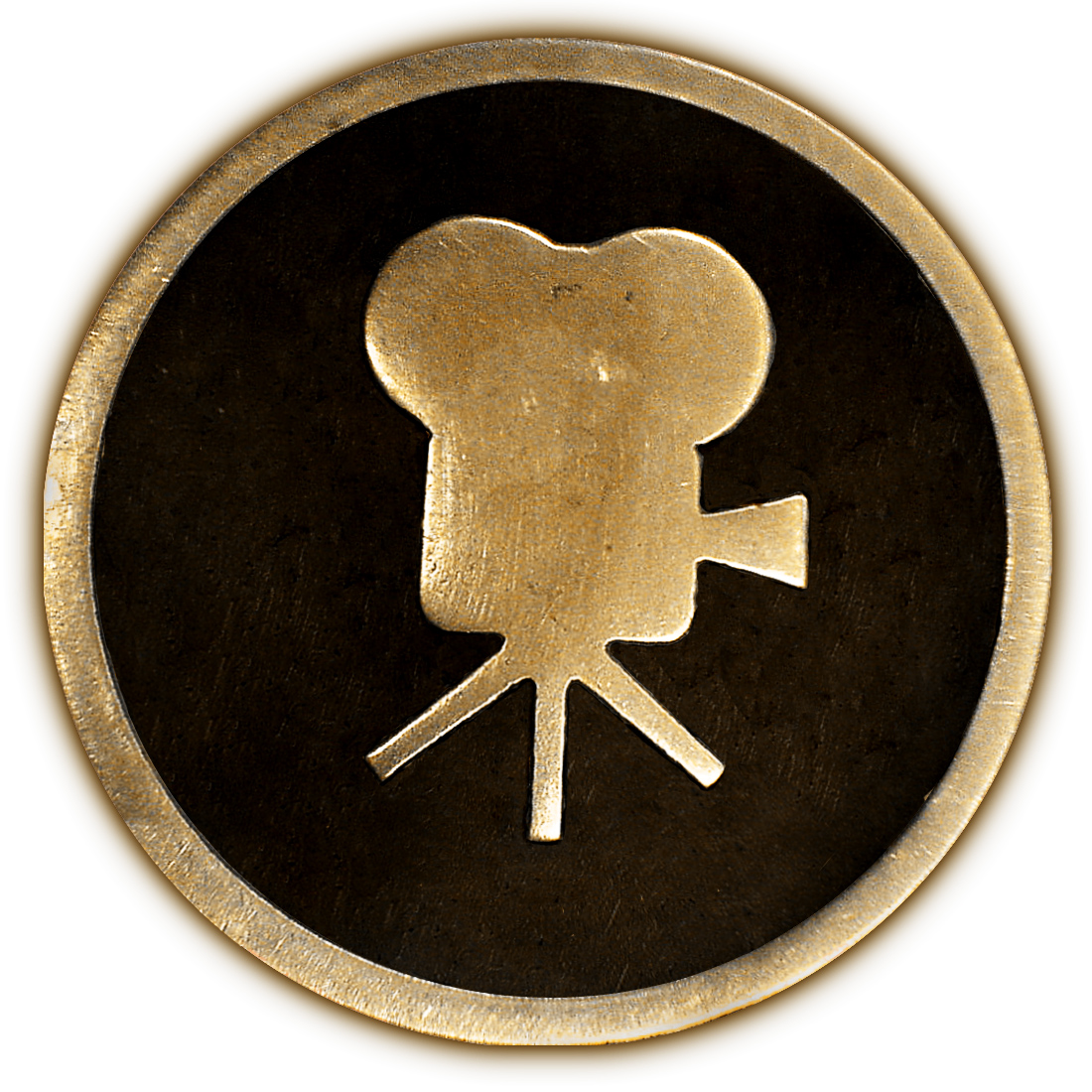
Film camera icon included on all motion picture stars on the Hollywood Walk of Fame

This list of actors with Hollywood Walk of Fame motion picture stars includes all actors who have been inducted into the Hollywood Walk of Fame in the category of motion pictures. This list does not include any non-acting professionals with motion picture stars, nor does it include any directors or producers with acting credits that are minor when compared to their directing and producing credits. This list also excludes all actors with television or live theatre stars on the Walk of Fame, as well as all animal actors and fictional characters.

The star locations and the years of the induction ceremonies are available on the official Hollywood Walk of Fame website maintained by the Hollywood Chamber of Commerce. The years of birth and death are available in the biographical articles on the Los Angeles Times Hollywood Star Walk website, with more accurate birth years from government records—such as birth certificates, census and military records—for some actors via their Wikipedia article sources.

== Statistics ==
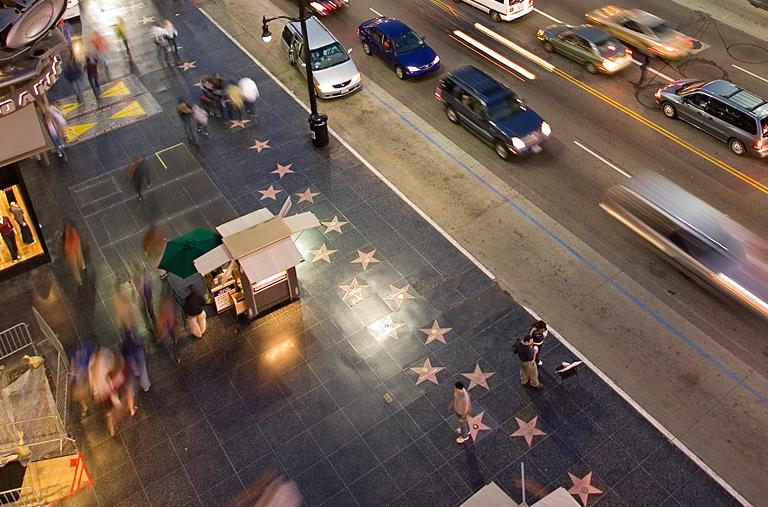
Walk of Fame stars on the sidewalk along Hollywood Boulevard

A total of 929 actors appear in the list—514 males and 415 females. A total of 184 Academy Award winners for acting appear in the list—90 males and 94 females—and 184 non-winning nominees—102 males and 82 females. A total of 564 actors with no Academy Award nominations for acting appear in the list—323 males and 241 females. A comedy duo of the late 19th–early 20th century, Mr. and Mrs. Sidney Drew, is listed here three times—once for Sidney and twice more for his two wives, Gladys Rankin and Lucille McVey—therefore, subtract two from this list's total for the actual count of motion picture category stars.

The youngest living male in the list is Daniel Radcliffe while the youngest living female is Scarlett Johansson. The oldest living female, and the oldest at induction, is Lisa Lu. The oldest living male is Mel Brooks. The youngest at induction is Patty McCormack at 15 years of age, while Bobby Driscoll was the youngest male actor, inducted at 23 years of age. The average age at induction is about 54, with males averaging about 57 and females averaging about 51. Posthumously-awarded stars are not included in the average calculations.

Since the initial star installations of 1958–60 when 665 film actors (the Drews, as noted above, being three of them) received stars—169 being posthumously inducted—there have been 18 additional posthumous stars awarded to film actors: Paul Robeson in 1978, Dorothy Dandridge in 1983, Philip Ahn and Eleanor Powell in 1984, Smiley Burnette and Steve McQueen in 1986, Natalie Wood in 1987, Bruce Lee in 1993, Cleavon Little and Spanky McFarland in 1994, John Belushi in 2004, Chris Farley in 2005, Pedro Gonzalez Gonzalez in 2008, Richard Burton in 2013, Toshiro Mifune in 2016, Carrie Fisher and Ray Liotta in 2023, and Chadwick Boseman in 2025.

As of 2025, more than 2,829 stars are on the Hollywood Walk of Fame among all five categories: motion pictures, television, recording, radio and live performance. Stars for motion picture actors comprise about one third of all Walk of Fame stars.

== Table key ==
Table key
	sort Male / Female by clicking on 2nd column heading
Address	6xxx/7xxx Hollywood Boulevard, 1xxx Vine Street
Inducted †	Year of induction ceremony
At age	Age at induction, or ~ if posthumous
Oscar ‡	Academy Award for acting: Won, Nominee, or ~ if no acting nominations

† four actors—Alice Calhoun, Patty McCormack, Henry O'Neill and Helen Twelvetrees—have no induction year specified on the official site, while Joyce Compton is missing a profile page on the official website, though she appears on the Los Angeles Times website; in all those cases, the year is presumed to be 1960 which was the year of the initial placement of 1,558 stars.
‡ only standard Academy Awards for acting are considered in this list, not lifetime, juvenile, or any non-acting achievements, such as for directing, producing, writing, etc.; Academy Award information is available on the official Academy of Motion Picture Arts and Sciences database website via dynamically-generated lists.

== List of actors ==
The list is designed to be sortable by clicking on any of the column headings; however, sorting is only possible if JavaScript is enabled in your web browser. If viewing on a mobile device, switch to the desktop view to enable sorting (click on the word Desktop at the bottom of the page).

The initial sort order is by actor surnames. Clicking the same column heading a second time sorts in the reverse order. For example:

- to see the actors in order along Hollywood Boulevard and Vine Street, click on the Address column heading; reverse the order by clicking the same column heading a second time
- to group the actors with males separated from females, click the second column heading; click once for females first or twice for males first
- to see all the actors sorted from youngest to oldest, click the Age column heading once; click again to reverse the order.

Actor		Born	Died	Age	Address	Inducted	At age	Oscar
Bud Abbott	M	1897	1974	76	1611	1960	63	~
Art Acord	M	1890	1931	40	1709	1960	~	~
Amy Adams	F	1974	~	52	6280	2017	43	Nom
Renee Adoree	F	1898	1933	35	1601	1960	~	~
Philip Ahn	M	1905	1978	72	6211	1984	~	~
Frank Albertson	M	1909	1964	55	6754	1960	51	~
Ben Alexander	M	1911	1969	58	6433	1960	48	~
Rex Allen	M	1920	1999	78	6821	1975	55	~
Tim Allen	M	1953	~	73	6834	2004	51	~
Kirstie Alley	F	1951	2022	71	7000	1995	44	~
June Allyson	F	1917	2006	88	1537	1960	43	~
Don Alvarado	M	1904	1967	62	6504	1960	56	~
Adrienne Ames	F	1907	1947	39	1612	1960	~	~
Bronco Billy Anderson	M	1882	1971	88	1651	1960	78	~
Mary Anderson	F	1918	2014	96	1645	1960	42	~
Julie Andrews	F	1935	~	91	6901	1979	44	Won
Heather Angel	F	1909	1986	77	6301	1960	51	~
Jennifer Aniston	F	1969	~	57	6270	2012	43	~
Ann-Margret	F	1941	~	85	6501	1973	32	Nom
Roscoe Arbuckle	M	1887	1933	46	6701	1960	~	~
Alan Arkin	M	1934	2023	89	6914	2019	85	Won
Richard Arlen	M	1899	1976	76	6755	1960	61	~
George Arliss	M	1868	1946	77	6648	1960	~	Won
Desi Arnaz	M	1917	1986	69	6325	1960	43	~
Jean Arthur	F	1900	1991	90	6333	1960	60	Nom
Fred Astaire	M	1899	1987	88	6756	1960	61	Nom
Nils Asther	M	1897	1981	84	6705	1960	63	~
Mary Astor	F	1906	1987	81	6701	1960	54	Won
Gene Autry	M	1907	1998	91	6644	1960	53	~
Agnes Ayres	F	1896	1940	44	6504	1960	~	~
Lew Ayres	M	1908	1996	88	6385	1960	52	Nom
Lauren Bacall	F	1924	2014	89	1724	1960	36	Nom
Kevin Bacon	M	1958	~	68	6356	2003	45	~
Lloyd Bacon	M	1890	1955	65	7011	1960	~	~
King Baggot	M	1879	1948	68	6312	1960	~	~
Fay Bainter	F	1893	1968	74	7021	1960	67	Won
Carroll Baker	F	1931	~	95	1725	1960	29	Nom
Lucille Ball	F	1911	1989	77	6436	1960	49	~
Antonio Banderas	M	1960	~	66	6801	2005	45	Nom
Tallulah Bankhead	F	1902	1968	66	6141	1960	58	~
Vilma Banky	F	1898	1991	93	7021	1960	62	~
Theda Bara	F	1890	1955	64	6307	1960	~	~
Javier Bardem	M	1969	~	57	6834	2012	43	Won
Lynn Bari	F	1913	1989	75	6116	1960	47	~
Binnie Barnes	F	1903	1998	95	1501	1960	57	~
Mona Barrie	F	1909	1964	54	6140	1960	51	~
Wendy Barrie	F	1912	1978	65	1708	1960	48	~
Bessie Barriscale	F	1884	1965	80	6652	1960	76	~
Drew Barrymore	F	1975	~	51	6925	2004	29	~
Ethel Barrymore	F	1879	1959	79	7001	1960	~	Won
John Barrymore	M	1882	1942	60	6667	1960	~	~
Lionel Barrymore	M	1878	1954	76	1724	1960	~	Won
Richard Barthelmess	M	1895	1963	68	6755	1960	65	Nom
Freddie Bartholomew	M	1924	1992	67	6663	1960	36	~
Billy Barty	M	1924	2000	76	6922	1981	57	~
Richard Basehart	M	1914	1984	70	6276	1960	46	~
Kim Basinger	F	1953	~	72	7021	1992	39	Won
Lina Basquette	F	1907	1943	87	1529	1960	~	~
Angela Bassett	F	1958	~	68	7000	2008	50	Nom
Jason Bateman	M	1969	~	57	6533	2017	48	~
Kathy Bates	F	1948	~	78	6927	2016	68	Won
Anne Baxter	F	1923	1985	62	6741	1960	37	Won
Warner Baxter	M	1889	1951	62	6284	1960	~	Won
Beverly Bayne	F	1894	1982	87	1752	1960	66	~
William Beaudine	M	1892	1970	78	1777	1960	68	~
Wallace Beery	M	1885	1949	64	7001	1960	~	Won
Kristen Bell	F	1980	~	46	6225	2019	39	~
Madge Bellamy	F	1899	1990	90	6517	1960	61	~
John Belushi	M	1949	1982	33	6355	2004	~	~
Robert Benchley	M	1889	1945	56	1724	1960	~	~
Annette Bening	F	1958	~	68	6927	2006	48	Nom
Belle Bennett	F	1891	1932	41	1511	1960	~	~
Constance Bennett	F	1904	1965	60	6250	1960	56	~
Joan Bennett	F	1910	1990	80	6300	1960	50	~
Jack Benny	M	1894	1974	80	6650	1960	66	~
Edgar Bergen	M	1903	1978	75	6766	1960	57	~
Ingrid Bergman	F	1915	1982	67	6759	1960	45	Won
Sarah Bernhardt	F	1844	1923	78	1751	1960	~	~
Halle Berry	F	1966	~	60	6801	2007	41	Won
Edna Best	F	1900	1974	74	6124	1960	60	~
Charles Bickford	M	1891	1967	76	6780	1960	69	Nom
Constance Binney	F	1896	1989	93	6301	1960	64	~
Jack Black	M	1969	~	57	6441	2018	49	~
Sidney Blackmer	M	1895	1973	78	1625	1960	65	~
Carlyle Blackwell	M	1884	1955	71	6340	1960	~	~
Cate Blanchett	F	1969	~	57	6712	2008	39	Won
Emily Blunt	F	1983	~	43	6930	2026	43	Nom
Joan Blondell	F	1906	1979	73	6311	1960	54	Nom
Orlando Bloom	M	1977	~	49	6927	2014	37	~
Monte Blue	M	1887	1963	76	6290	1960	73	~
Ann Blyth	F	1927	2026	98	6733	1960	32	Nom
Betty Blythe	F	1893	1972	78	1708	1960	67	~
Eleanor Boardman	F	1898	1991	93	6928	1960	62	~
Humphrey Bogart	M	1899	1957	57	6322	1960	~	Won
Mary Boland	F	1882	1965	83	6150	1960	78	~
John Boles	M	1895	1969	73	6530	1960	65	~
Ray Bolger	M	1904	1987	83	6788	1960	56	~
Beulah Bondi	F	1889	1981	91	1718	1960	71	Nom
Shirley Booth	F	1898	1992	94	6850	1960	62	Won
Olive Borden	F	1906	1947	41	6801	1958	~	~
Ernest Borgnine	M	1917	2012	95	6324	1960	43	Won
Frank Borzage	M	1894	1962	68	6300	1960	66	~
Chadwick Boseman	M	1976	2020	43	6904	2025	~	Nom
Hobart Bosworth	M	1867	1943	76	6522	1960	~	~
Clara Bow	F	1905	1965	60	1500	1960	55	~
John Bowers	M	1885	1936	50	1709	1960	~	~
William Boyd	M	1895	1972	77	1734	1960	65	~
Charles Boyer	M	1899	1978	78	6300	1960	61	Nom
Alice Brady	F	1892	1939	46	6201	1960	~	Won
Marlon Brando	M	1924	2004	80	1765	1960	36	Won
Walter Brennan	M	1894	1974	80	6501	1960	66	Won
Evelyn Brent	F	1901	1975	73	6548	1960	59	~
George Brent	M	1904	1979	75	1709	1960	56	~
Mary Brian	F	1906	2002	96	1559	1960	54	~
Fanny Brice	F	1891	1951	59	6415	1960	~	~
Jeff Bridges	M	1949	~	76	7065	1994	45	Won
Matthew Broderick	M	1962	~	64	6801	2006	44	~
Charles Bronson	M	1921	2003	81	6901	1980	59	~
Mel Brooks	M	1926	~	100	6712	2010	84	~
Pierce Brosnan	M	1953	~	73	7021	1997	44	~
Joe E. Brown	M	1892	1973	81	1680	1960	68	~
Johnny Mack Brown	M	1904	1974	70	6101	1960	56	~
Tom Brown	M	1913	1990	77	1648	1960	47	~
Vanessa Brown	F	1928	1999	71	1621	1960	32	~
Tod Browning	M	1880	1962	82	6225	1960	80	~
Yul Brynner	M	1920	1985	65	6162	1960	40	Won
Sandra Bullock	F	1964	~	62	6801	2005	41	Won
John Bunny	M	1863	1915	51	1715	1960	~	~
Billie Burke	F	1884	1970	85	6617	1960	76	Nom
Smiley Burnette	M	1911	1967	55	6125	1986	~	~
Bob Burns	M	1890	1956	65	1601	1960	~	~
George Burns	M	1896	1996	100	1639	1960	64	Won
Richard Burton	M	1925	1984	58	6336	2013	~	Nom
Mae Busch	F	1891	1946	54	7021	1960	~	~
Francis X. Bushman	M	1883	1966	83	1651	1960	77	~
David Butler	M	1894	1979	84	6561	1960	66	~
Charles Butterworth	M	1896	1946	49	7036	1960	~	~
Spring Byington	F	1886	1971	84	6507	1960	74	Nom
James Caan	M	1940	2022	82	6648	1978	38	Nom
Nicolas Cage	M	1964	~	62	7021	1998	34	Won
James Cagney	M	1899	1986	86	6504	1960	61	Won
Alice Calhoun	F	1900	1966	65	6815	1960	60	~
Rory Calhoun	M	1922	1999	76	7007	1960	38	~
Dyan Cannon	F	1937	~	89	6608	1983	46	Nom
Judy Canova	F	1913	1983	69	6821	1960	47	~
Cantinflas	M	1911	1993	81	6438	1980	69	~
Eddie Cantor	M	1892	1964	72	6648	1960	68	~
Yakima Canutt	M	1895	1986	90	1500	1985	90	~
Steve Carell	M	1962	~	64	6708	2016	54	Nom
Harry Carey	M	1878	1947	69	1521	1960	~	Nom
Kitty Carlisle	F	1910	2007	96	6611	1960	50	~
Mary Carlisle	F	1914	2018	104	6679	1960	46	~
Sue Carol	F	1906	1982	75	1639	1982	76	~
Leslie Caron	F	1931	~	95	6153	2009	78	Nom
John Carradine	M	1906	1988	82	6240	1960	54	~
Leo Carrillo	M	1880	1961	81	1635	1960	80	~
Madeleine Carroll	F	1906	1987	81	6707	1960	54	~
Nancy Carroll	F	1903	1965	61	1725	1960	57	Nom
Walter Catlett	M	1889	1960	71	1713	1960	71	~
Jackie Chan	M	1954	~	72	6801	2002	48	~
Jeff Chandler	M	1918	1961	42	1770	1960	42	Nom
Lon Chaney	M	1883	1930	47	7046	1960	~	~
Charles Chaplin	M	1889	1977	88	6751	1972	83	Nom
Cyd Charisse	F	1922	2008	86	1601	1960	38	~
Charley Chase	M	1893	1940	46	6630	1960	~	~
Chevy Chase	M	1943	~	83	7021	1993	50	~
Ilka Chase	F	1900	1978	77	6361	1960	60	~
Jessica Chastain	F	1977	~	49	6258	2025	48	Won
Ruth Chatterton	F	1892	1961	68	6263	1960	68	Nom
Virginia Cherrill	F	1908	1996	88	1545	1960	52	~
Morris Chestnut	M	1969	~	57	6353	2022	53	~
Maurice Chevalier	M	1888	1972	83	1651	1960	72	Nom
Ina Claire	F	1893	1985	91	6150	1960	67	~
Marguerite Clark	F	1883	1940	57	6300	1960	~	~
Ethel Clayton	F	1882	1966	83	6936	1960	78	~
Montgomery Clift	M	1920	1966	45	6104	1960	40	Nom
Glenn Close	F	1947	~	79	7000	2009	62	Nom
Andy Clyde	M	1892	1967	75	6758	1960	68	~
Charles Coburn	M	1877	1961	84	6268	1960	83	Won
James Coburn	M	1928	2002	74	7055	1994	66	Won
Steve Cochran	M	1917	1965	48	1750	1960	43	~
George M. Cohan	M	1878	1942	64	6734	1960	~	~
Claudette Colbert	F	1903	1996	92	6812	1960	57	Won
Constance Collier	F	1878	1955	77	6231	1960	~	~
William Collier Jr.	M	1902	1987	84	6340	1960	58	~
Ronald Colman	M	1891	1958	67	6801	1960	~	Won
Betty Compson	F	1897	1974	77	1751	1960	63	Nom
Joyce Compton	F	1907	1997	90	7000	1960	53	~
Chester Conklin	M	1886	1971	85	1560	1960	74	~
Heinie Conklin	M	1886	1959	73	1776	1960	~	~
Jack Conway	M	1886	1952	66	1500	1960	~	~
Jackie Coogan	M	1914	1984	69	1654	1960	46	~
Clyde Cook	M	1891	1984	92	6531	1960	69	~
Donald Cook	M	1901	1961	60	1718	1960	59	~
Gary Cooper	M	1901	1961	60	6243	1960	59	Won
Jackie Cooper	M	1922	2011	88	1507	1960	38	Nom
Ricardo Cortez	M	1899	1977	77	1500	1960	61	~
Dolores Costello	F	1903	1979	75	1645	1960	57	~
Helene Costello	F	1906	1957	50	1500	1960	~	~
Lou Costello	M	1906	1959	52	6438	1960	~	~
Maurice Costello	M	1877	1950	73	6515	1960	~	~
Kevin Costner	M	1955	~	71	6801	2003	48	Nom
Joseph Cotten	M	1905	1994	88	6382	1960	55	~
Daniel Craig	M	1968	~	58	7007	2021	53	~
Broderick Crawford	M	1911	1986	74	6901	1960	49	Won
Joan Crawford	F	1904	1977	73	1752	1960	56	Won
Laird Cregar	M	1913	1944	31	1716	1960	~	~
Richard Crenna	M	1926	2003	76	6714	1988	62	~
Laura Hope Crews	F	1879	1942	62	6251	1960	~	~
Donald Crisp	M	1882	1974	91	1628	1960	78	Won
Richard Cromwell	M	1910	1960	50	1627	1960	50	~
Bing Crosby	M	1903	1977	74	1611	1960	57	Won
Scatman Crothers	M	1910	1986	76	6712	1981	71	~
Russell Crowe	M	1964	~	62	6801	2010	46	Won
Tom Cruise	M	1962	~	64	6912	1986	24	Nom
Penelope Cruz	F	1974	~	52	6834	2011	37	Won
James Cruze	M	1884	1942	58	6922	1960	~	~
Billy Crystal	M	1948	~	78	6925	1991	43	~
Macaulay Culkin	M	1980	~	46	6353	2023	43	~
Benedict Cumberbatch	M	1976	~	50	6918	2022	45	Nom
Constance Cummings	F	1910	2005	95	6201	1960	50	~
Irving Cummings	M	1888	1959	70	6816	1960	~	~
Robert Cummings	M	1910	1990	80	6667	1960	50	~
Alan Curtis	M	1909	1953	43	7021	1960	~	~
Jamie Lee Curtis	F	1958	~	67	6600	1998	40	Won
Tony Curtis	M	1925	2010	85	6817	1960	35	Nom
John Cusack	M	1966	~	60	6644	2012	46	~
Willem Dafoe	M	1955	~	71	6284	2024	68	Nom
Arlene Dahl	F	1925	2021	96	1624	1960	35	~
Dorothy Dalton	F	1893	1972	78	1560	1960	67	~
Matt Damon	M	1970	~	56	6801	2007	37	Nom
Viola Dana	F	1897	1987	90	6541	1960	63	~
Dorothy Dandridge	F	1922	1965	42	6719	1983	~	Nom
Karl Dane	M	1886	1934	47	6140	1960	~	~
Bebe Daniels	F	1901	1971	70	1716	1960	59	~
Linda Darnell	F	1923	1965	41	1631	1960	37	~
Jane Darwell	F	1879	1967	87	6735	1960	81	Won
Keith David	M	1956	~	70	6225	2026	70	~
Marion Davies	F	1897	1961	64	6326	1960	63	~
Bette Davis	F	1908	1989	81	6225	1960	52	Won
Joan Davis	F	1907	1961	53	1521	1960	53	~
Viola Davis	F	1965	~	61	7013	2017	52	Won
Doris Day	F	1922	2019	97	6735	1960	38	Nom
Laraine Day	F	1920	2007	87	6676	1960	40	~
James Dean	M	1931	1955	24	1719	1960	~	Nom
Yvonne De Carlo	F	1922	2007	84	6124	1960	38	~
Frances Dee	F	1909	2004	94	7080	1994	85	~
Carter DeHaven	M	1886	1977	90	1742	1960	74	~
Gloria DeHaven	F	1925	2016	91	6933	1960	35	~
Olivia de Havilland	F	1916	2020	104	6762	1960	44	Won
Marguerite De La Motte	F	1902	1950	47	6902	1960	~	~
Dolores del Rio	F	1904	1983	78	1630	1960	56	~
Dom DeLuise	M	1933	2009	75	1765	1985	52	~
William Demarest	M	1892	1983	91	6667	1979	87	Nom
Reginald Denny	M	1891	1967	75	6657	1960	69	~
Johnny Depp	M	1963	~	63	7018	1999	36	Nom
Eugenio Derbez	M	1961	~	65	7013	2016	55	~
Bruce Dern	M	1936	~	90	6270	2010	74	Nom
Laura Dern	F	1967	~	59	6270	2010	43	Won
Elliott Dexter	M	1870	1941	71	1751	1960	~	~
Cameron Diaz	F	1972	~	54	6712	2009	37	~
Vin Diesel	M	1967	~	59	7000	2013	46	~
Marlene Dietrich	F	1901	1992	90	6400	1960	59	Nom
Richard Dix	M	1893	1949	56	1608	1960	~	Nom
Robert Donat	M	1905	1958	53	6420	1960	~	Won
Marie Doro	F	1882	1956	74	1725	1960	~	~
Kirk Douglas	M	1916	2020	103	6263	1960	44	Nom
Melvyn Douglas	M	1901	1981	80	6423	1960	59	Won
Michael Douglas	M	1944	~	82	6259	2018	74	Won
Paul Douglas	M	1907	1959	52	1648	1960	~	~
Billie Dove	F	1903	1997	94	6351	1960	57	~
Frances Drake	F	1912	2000	87	6821	1960	48	~
Louise Dresser	F	1878	1965	85	6538	1960	82	Nom
Marie Dressler	F	1868	1934	65	1731	1960	~	Won
Ellen Drew	F	1915	2003	88	6901	1960	45	~
Mr. and Mrs. Sidney Drew (Sidney Drew)	M	1863	1919	55	6901	1960	~	~
Mr. and Mrs. Sidney Drew (Gladys Rankin)	F	1870	1914	43	6901	1960	~	~
Mr. and Mrs. Sidney Drew (Lucille McVey)	F	1890	1925	35	6901	1960	~	~
Richard Dreyfuss	M	1947	~	78	7021	1996	49	Won
Bobby Driscoll	M	1937	1968	31	1560	1960	23	~
Patty Duke	F	1946	2016	69	7000	2004	58	Won
Bill Duke	M	1943	~	83	6201	2026	83	~
Faye Dunaway	F	1941	~	85	7021	1996	55	Won
James Dunn	M	1901	1967	65	6555	1960	59	Won
Irene Dunne	F	1898	1990	91	6440	1960	62	Nom
Mildred Dunnock	F	1901	1991	90	6613	1960	59	Nom
Kirsten Dunst	F	1982	~	44	7076	2019	37	Nom
Jimmy Durante	M	1893	1980	86	1606	1960	67	~
Deanna Durbin	F	1921	2013	91	1724	1960	39	~
Charles Durning	M	1923	2012	89	6504	2008	85	Nom
Robert Duvall	M	1931	2026	95	6801	2003	72	Won
Ann Dvorak	F	1912	1979	68	6321	1960	48	~
Buddy Ebsen	M	1908	2003	95	1765	1960	52	~
Nelson Eddy	M	1901	1967	65	6311	1960	59	~
Robert Edeson	M	1868	1931	62	1628	1960	~	~
Zac Efron	M	1987	~	39	6426	2023	36	~
Faye Emerson	F	1917	1983	65	6529	1960	43	~
Robert Englund	M	1947	~	79	6644	2025	78	~
Leon Errol	M	1881	1951	70	6801	1960	~	~
Madge Evans	F	1909	1981	71	1752	1960	51	~
Douglas Fairbanks Jr.	M	1909	2000	90	6318	1960	51	~
Douglas Fairbanks	M	1883	1939	56	7022	1960	~	~
Chris Farley	M	1964	1997	33	6366	2005	~	~
Richard Farnsworth	M	1920	2000	80	1560	1992	72	Nom
Dustin Farnum	M	1874	1929	55	6635	1960	~	~
William Farnum	M	1876	1953	76	6322	1960	~	~
Geraldine Farrar	F	1882	1967	85	1620	1960	78	~
Charles Farrell	M	1900	1990	90	7021	1960	60	~
Glenda Farrell	F	1904	1971	66	6524	1960	56	~
William Faversham	M	1868	1940	72	1724	1960	~	~
Frank Fay	M	1891	1961	69	6282	1960	69	~
Alice Faye	F	1915	1998	83	6930	1960	45	~
Julia Faye	F	1892	1966	73	6501	1960	68	~
Louise Fazenda	F	1895	1962	66	6801	1958	63	~
Helen Ferguson	F	1900	1977	76	6153	1960	60	~
Will Ferrell	M	1967	~	59	6767	2015	48	~
Jose Ferrer	M	1912	1992	80	6541	1960	48	Won
Mel Ferrer	M	1917	2008	90	6268	1960	43	~
Stepin Fetchit	M	1902	1985	83	1751	1960	58	~
Sally Field	F	1946	~	79	6767	2014	68	Won
W. C. Fields	M	1880	1946	66	7004	1960	~	~
Flora Finch	F	1867	1940	72	6673	1960	~	~
Colin Firth	M	1960	~	66	6714	2011	51	Won
Carrie Fisher	F	1956	2016	60	6840	2023	~	~
Barry Fitzgerald	M	1888	1961	72	6252	1960	72	Won
Geraldine Fitzgerald	F	1913	2005	91	6353	1960	47	Nom
Rhonda Fleming	F	1923	2020	97	6660	1960	37	~
Errol Flynn	M	1909	1959	50	6654	1960	~	~
Nina Foch	F	1924	2008	84	6322	1960	36	Nom
Henry Fonda	M	1905	1982	77	1601	1960	55	Won
Peter Fonda	M	1940	2019	79	7018	2003	63	Nom
Joan Fontaine	F	1917	2013	96	1645	1960	43	Won
Glenn Ford	M	1916	2006	90	6933	1960	44	~
Harrison Ford	M	1884	1957	73	6665	1960	~	~
Harrison Ford	M	1942	~	84	6801	2003	61	Nom
Jodie Foster	F	1962	~	63	6927	2016	54	Won
Michael J. Fox	M	1961	~	65	7021	2002	41	~
Jamie Foxx	M	1967	~	58	6801	2007	40	Won
Eddie Foy	M	1856	1928	71	1725	1960	~	~
Kay Francis	F	1905	1968	63	6766	1960	55	~
James Franco	M	1978	~	48	6838	2013	35	Nom
William Frawley	M	1887	1966	79	6322	1960	73	~
Pauline Frederick	F	1883	1938	55	7000	1960	~	~
Morgan Freeman	M	1937	~	89	7021	2003	66	Won
Annette Funicello	F	1942	2013	70	6834	1993	51	~
Betty Furness	F	1916	1994	78	1533	1960	44	~
Clark Gable	M	1901	1960	59	1608	1960	59	Won
Gal Gadot	F	1985	~	39	6840	2025	39	~
Greta Garbo	F	1905	1990	84	6901	1960	55	Nom
Andy Garcia	M	1956	~	70	7000	1995	39	Nom
Ava Gardner	F	1922	1990	67	1560	1960	38	Nom
John Garfield	M	1913	1952	39	7065	1960	~	Nom
Judy Garland	F	1922	1969	47	1715	1960	38	Nom
Jennifer Garner	F	1972	~	54	6920	2018	46	~
Peggy Ann Garner	F	1932	1984	52	6604	1960	28	~
Greer Garson	F	1904	1996	91	1651	1960	56	Won
Janet Gaynor	F	1906	1984	77	6284	1960	54	Won
Mitzi Gaynor	F	1931	2024	93	6288	1960	29	~
Giancarlo Giannini	M	1942	~	84	6361	2023	80	Nom
Hoot Gibson	M	1892	1962	70	1765	1960	68	~
Billy Gilbert	M	1894	1971	77	6263	1960	66	~
John Gilbert	M	1899	1936	36	1755	1960	~	~
Dorothy Gish	F	1898	1968	70	6385	1960	62	~
Lillian Gish	F	1893	1993	99	1720	1960	67	Nom
Louise Glaum	F	1888	1970	82	6834	1960	72	~
James Gleason	M	1882	1959	76	7038	1960	~	Nom
Paulette Goddard	F	1910	1990	79	1652	1960	50	Nom
Whoopi Goldberg	F	1955	~	70	6801	2001	46	Won
Jeff Goldblum	M	1952	~	73	6656	2018	65	~
Pedro Gonzalez Gonzalez	M	1925	2006	80	1555	2008	~	~
Cuba Gooding Jr.	M	1968	~	58	6834	2002	34	Won
John Goodman	M	1952	~	74	6767	2017	65	~
Louis Gossett Jr.	M	1936	2024	87	7000	1992	56	Won
Jetta Goudal	F	1891	1985	93	6333	1960	69	~
Betty Grable	F	1916	1973	56	6525	1960	44	~
Gloria Grahame	F	1923	1981	57	6522	1960	37	Won
Cary Grant	M	1904	1986	82	1610	1960	56	Nom
Bonita Granville	F	1923	1988	65	6607	1960	37	Nom
Gilda Gray	F	1901	1959	58	6620	1960	~	~
Kathryn Grayson	F	1922	2010	88	1600	1960	38	~
Mitzi Green	F	1920	1969	48	6430	1960	40	~
Jane Greer	F	1924	2001	76	1634	1960	36	~
Corinne Griffith	F	1894	1979	84	1560	1960	66	Nom
Raymond Griffith	M	1890	1957	67	6124	1960	~	~
Texas Guinan	F	1884	1933	49	1765	1960	~	~
Alec Guinness	M	1914	2000	86	1559	1960	46	Won
Steve Guttenberg	M	1958	~	68	6411	2011	53	~
Edmund Gwenn	M	1877	1959	81	1755	1960	~	Won
William Haines	M	1900	1973	73	7012	1960	60	~
Alan Hale	M	1892	1950	57	6532	1960	~	~
Creighton Hale	M	1882	1965	83	6915	1960	78	~
Monte Hale	M	1919	2009	89	7000	2004	85	~
Jon Hall	M	1915	1979	64	1724	1960	45	~
Mark Hamill	M	1951	~	75	6834	2018	66	~
George Hamilton	M	1939	~	87	7021	2009	70	~
Lloyd Hamilton	M	1891	1935	43	6141	1960	~	~
Neil Hamilton	M	1899	1984	85	6634	1960	61	~
Tom Hanks	M	1956	~	70	7000	1992	36	Won
Ann Harding	F	1902	1981	79	6201	1960	58	Nom
Sir Cedric Hardwicke	M	1893	1964	71	6201	1960	67	~
Oliver Hardy	M	1892	1957	65	1500	1960	~	~
Jean Harlow	F	1911	1937	26	6910	1960	~	~
Ed Harris	M	1950	~	75	6712	2015	65	Nom
Mildred Harris	F	1901	1944	42	6307	1960	~	~
Rex Harrison	M	1908	1990	82	6904	1960	52	Won
William S. Hart	M	1864	1946	81	6363	1960	~	~
Signe Hasso	F	1915	2002	86	7080	1994	79	~
Anne Hathaway	F	1982	~	43	6927	2019	36	Won
Raymond Hatton	M	1887	1971	84	1708	1960	73	~
June Haver	F	1926	2005	79	1777	1960	34	~
June Havoc	F	1912	2010	97	6618	1960	48	~
Goldie Hawn	F	1945	~	80	6201	2017	72	Won
Sessue Hayakawa	M	1889	1973	84	1645	1960	71	Nom
Salma Hayek	F	1966	~	60	6901	2021	55	Nom
Helen Hayes	F	1900	1993	92	6258	1960	60	Won
Louis Hayward	M	1909	1985	75	1500	1960	51	~
Susan Hayward	F	1917	1975	57	6251	1960	43	Won
Rita Hayworth	F	1918	1987	68	1645	1960	42	~
Eileen Heckart	F	1919	2001	82	6140	1960	41	Won
Tippi Hedren	F	1930	~	96	7060	2003	73	~
Van Heflin	M	1908	1971	62	6311	1960	52	Won
Chris Hemsworth	M	1983	~	40	6819	2024	40	~
Sonja Henie	F	1912	1969	57	6101	1960	48	~
Paul Henreid	M	1908	1992	84	6366	1960	52	~
Taraji P. Henson	F	1970	~	56	6212	2019	48	Nom
Audrey Hepburn	F	1929	1993	63	1652	1960	31	Won
Katharine Hepburn	F	1907	2003	96	6284	1960	53	Won
Hugh Herbert	M	1884	1952	67	6251	1960	~	~
Jean Hersholt	M	1886	1956	69	6501	1960	~	~
Irene Hervey	F	1909	1998	89	6336	1960	51	~
Charlton Heston	M	1923	2008	84	1628	1960	37	Won
William Holden	M	1918	1981	63	1651	1960	42	Won
Judy Holliday	F	1921	1965	43	6901	1960	39	Won
Celeste Holm	F	1917	2012	95	1500	1960	43	Won
Phillips Holmes	M	1907	1942	35	6908	1960	~	~
Taylor Holmes	M	1878	1959	81	6821	1960	~	~
Jack Holt	M	1888	1951	62	6313	1960	~	~
James Hong	M	1929	~	97	6931	2022	93	~
Bob Hope	M	1903	2003	100	6541	1960	57	~
Anthony Hopkins	M	1937	~	88	6801	2003	66	Won
Miriam Hopkins	F	1902	1972	69	1709	1960	58	Nom
Dennis Hopper	M	1936	2010	74	6712	2010	74	Nom
Hedda Hopper	F	1885	1966	80	6313	1960	75	~
Lena Horne	F	1917	2010	92	6282	1960	43	~
Edward Everett Horton	M	1886	1970	84	6427	1960	74	~
Leslie Howard	M	1893	1943	50	6550	1960	~	Nom
Ron Howard	M	1954	~	72	6931	2015	61	~
Rochelle Hudson	F	1916	1972	55	6200	1960	44	~
Rock Hudson	M	1925	1985	59	6116	1960	35	Nom
Josephine Hull	F	1877	1957	80	6502	1960	~	Won
Holly Hunter	F	1958	~	68	7000	2008	50	Won
Kim Hunter	F	1922	2002	79	1617	1960	38	Won
Ruth Hussey	F	1911	2005	93	1551	1960	49	Nom
Anjelica Huston	F	1951	~	75	6270	2010	59	Won
John Huston	M	1906	1987	81	1765	1960	54	Nom
Walter Huston	M	1883	1950	67	6624	1960	~	Won
Betty Hutton	F	1921	2007	86	6259	1960	39	~
Jill Ireland	F	1936	1990	54	6751	1989	53	~
Hugh Jackman	M	1968	~	58	6931	2012	44	Nom
Samuel L. Jackson	M	1948	~	77	7018	2000	52	Nom
Dean Jagger	M	1903	1991	87	1623	1960	57	Won
Emil Jannings	M	1884	1950	65	1630	1960	~	Won
Isabel Jewell	F	1907	1972	64	1560	1960	53	~
Scarlett Johansson	F	1984	~	41	6931	2012	28	Nom
Ben Johnson	M	1918	1996	77	7083	1994	76	Won
Dwayne Johnson	M	1972	~	54	6801	2017	45	~
Van Johnson	M	1916	2008	92	6600	1960	44	~
Al Jolson	M	1886	1950	64	6622	1960	~	~
Buck Jones	M	1891	1942	50	6834	1960	~	~
Jennifer Jones	F	1919	2009	90	6429	1960	41	Won
Shirley Jones	F	1934	~	92	1541	1986	52	Won
Tommy Lee Jones	M	1946	~	80	6925	1994	48	Won
Michael B. Jordan	M	1987	~	39	6201	2023	36	Won
Victor Jory	M	1902	1982	79	6605	1960	58	~
Leatrice Joy	F	1896	1985	88	6517	1960	64	~
Katy Jurado	F	1924	2002	78	7065	1994	70	Nom
Boris Karloff	M	1887	1969	81	1737	1960	73	~
Danny Kaye	M	1911	1987	76	6563	1960	49	~
Buster Keaton	M	1895	1966	70	6619	1960	65	~
Michael Keaton	M	1951	~	75	6931	2016	65	Nom
Howard Keel	M	1919	2004	85	6253	1960	41	~
Ruby Keeler	F	1909	1993	83	6730	1960	51	~
Annette Kellerman	F	1887	1975	88	6608	1960	73	~
De Forest Kelley	M	1920	1999	79	7021	1991	71	~
Gene Kelly	M	1912	1996	83	6153	1960	48	Nom
Grace Kelly	F	1929	1982	52	6329	1960	31	Won
Nancy Kelly	F	1921	1995	73	7021	1960	39	Nom
Patsy Kelly	F	1910	1981	71	6669	1960	50	~
Arthur Kennedy	M	1914	1990	75	6681	1960	46	Nom
Edgar Kennedy	M	1890	1948	58	6901	1960	~	~
George Kennedy	M	1925	2016	91	6356	1991	66	Won
Madge Kennedy	F	1891	1987	96	1600	1960	69	~
Deborah Kerr	F	1921	2007	86	1709	1960	39	Nom
J. M. Kerrigan	M	1884	1964	79	6621	1960	76	~
Norman Kerry	M	1894	1956	61	6724	1960	~	~
Nicole Kidman	F	1967	~	59	6801	2003	35	Won
Ben Kingsley	M	1943	~	82	6931	2010	67	Won
Kevin Kline	M	1947	~	78	7000	2004	57	Won
June Knight	F	1913	1987	74	6247	1960	47	~
Theodore Kosloff	M	1882	1956	74	1617	1960	~	~
Kurt Kreuger	M	1916	2006	89	1560	1960	44	~
Otto Kruger	M	1885	1974	89	1734	1960	75	~
Barbara La Marr	F	1896	1926	29	1621	1960	~	~
Laura La Plante	F	1904	1996	91	6378	1960	56	~
Rod La Rocque	M	1898	1969	70	1580	1960	62	~
Alan Ladd	M	1913	1964	50	1601	1960	47	~
Diane Ladd	F	1935	2025	90	6270	2010	75	Nom
Alice Lake	F	1895	1967	72	1624	1960	65	~
Veronica Lake	F	1922	1973	50	6918	1960	38	~
Hedy Lamarr	F	1914	2000	85	6247	1960	46	~
Dorothy Lamour	F	1914	1996	81	6332	1960	46	~
Burt Lancaster	M	1913	1994	80	6801	1958	45	Won
Martin Landau	M	1928	2017	89	6801	2001	73	Won
Elissa Landi	F	1904	1948	43	1611	1960	~	~
Carole Landis	F	1919	1948	29	1765	1960	~	~
Nathan Lane	M	1956	~	70	6801	2005	49	~
Harry Langdon	M	1884	1944	60	6927	1960	~	~
Frances Langford	F	1913	2005	92	1500	1960	47	~
Angela Lansbury	F	1925	2022	96	6623	1960	35	Nom
Mario Lanza	M	1921	1959	38	6821	1960	~	~
Queen Latifah	F	1970	~	56	6915	2006	36	Nom
Charles Laughton	M	1899	1962	63	7021	1960	61	Won
Stan Laurel	M	1890	1965	74	7021	1960	70	~
Jude Law	M	1972	~	51	6840	2024	51	Nom
Francis Lederer	M	1899	2000	100	6902	1960	61	~
Anna Lee	F	1913	2004	91	6777	1993	80	~
Bruce Lee	M	1940	1973	32	6933	1993	~	~
Gypsy Rose Lee	F	1911	1970	59	6351	1960	49	~
Lila Lee	F	1901	1973	72	1716	1960	59	~
Janet Leigh	F	1927	2004	77	1777	1960	33	Nom
Vivien Leigh	F	1913	1967	53	6773	1960	47	Won
Jack Lemmon	M	1925	2001	76	6357	1960	35	Won
Jerry Lewis	M	1926	2017	91	6821	1960	34	~
Beatrice Lillie	F	1894	1989	94	6404	1960	66	~
Elmo Lincoln	M	1889	1952	63	7042	1960	~	~
Eric Linden	M	1909	1994	84	7098	1960	51	~
Margaret Lindsay	F	1910	1981	70	6318	1960	50	~
Ray Liotta	M	1954	2022	67	6201	2023	~	~
Cleavon Little	M	1939	1992	53	7080	1994	~	~
Harold Lloyd	M	1893	1971	77	1503	1960	67	~
Gene Lockhart	M	1891	1957	65	6307	1960	~	Nom
June Lockhart	F	1925	2025	100	6323	1960	35	~
Kathleen Lockhart	F	1894	1978	83	6241	1960	66	~
Gina Lollobrigida	F	1927	2023	95	6361	2018	90	~
Carole Lombard	F	1908	1942	33	6930	1960	~	Nom
Sophia Loren	F	1934	~	92	7060	1994	60	Won
Peter Lorre	M	1904	1964	59	6619	1960	56	~
Anita Louise	F	1915	1970	55	6821	1960	45	~
Bessie Love	F	1898	1986	87	6777	1960	62	Nom
Edmund Lowe	M	1890	1971	81	6363	1960	70	~
Myrna Loy	F	1905	1993	88	6685	1960	55	~
Lisa Lu	F	1927	~	98	1708	2025	98	~
Ludacris	M	1977	~	49	6426	2023	45	~
Bela Lugosi	M	1882	1956	73	6340	1960	~	~
Paul Lukas	M	1894	1971	77	6821	1960	66	Won
Keye Luke	M	1904	1991	86	7000	1990	86	~
Ida Lupino	F	1918	1995	77	6821	1960	42	~
Diana Lynn	F	1926	1971	45	1625	1960	34	~
Ben Lyon	M	1901	1979	78	1724	1960	59	~
Bert Lytell	M	1885	1954	69	6417	1960	~	~
Jeanette MacDonald	F	1903	1965	61	6157	1960	57	~
Katherine MacDonald	F	1881	1956	74	6759	1960	~	~
Ali MacGraw	F	1939	~	87	7057	2021	81	Nom
Helen Mack	F	1913	1986	72	6310	1960	47	~
Shirley MacLaine	F	1934	~	92	1617	1960	26	Won
Fred MacMurray	M	1908	1991	83	6421	1960	52	~
Jeanie MacPherson	F	1887	1946	59	6150	1960	~	~
William H. Macy	M	1950	~	76	7072	2012	62	Nom
Anna Magnani	F	1908	1973	65	6385	1960	52	Won
Mako	M	1933	2006	72	7095	1994	61	Nom
Karl Malden	M	1912	2009	97	6231	1960	48	Won
Dorothy Malone	F	1924	2018	93	1716	1960	36	Won
Hank Mann	M	1887	1971	84	6300	1960	73	~
Jayne Mansfield	F	1933	1967	34	6328	1960	27	~
Fredric March	M	1897	1975	77	1620	1960	63	Won
Mae Marsh	F	1894	1968	73	1600	1960	66	~
Herbert Marshall	M	1890	1966	75	6200	1960	70	~
Dean Martin	M	1917	1995	78	6519	1960	43	~
Marion Martin	F	1909	1985	76	6915	1960	51	~
Tony Martin	M	1913	2012	98	6436	1960	47	~
Ilona Massey	F	1910	1974	64	1623	1960	50	~
Raymond Massey	M	1896	1983	86	1719	1960	64	Nom
Marlee Matlin	F	1965	~	61	6667	2009	44	Won
Walter Matthau	M	1920	2000	79	6357	1982	62	Won
Victor Mature	M	1913	1999	86	6780	1960	47	~
Ken Maynard	M	1895	1973	77	6751	1960	65	~
Paul Mazursky	M	1930	2014	84	6667	2013	83	~
May McAvoy	F	1899	1984	84	1731	1960	61	~
Rachel McAdams	F	1978	~	47	6922	2026	47	Nom
Mercedes McCambridge	F	1916	2004	87	1720	1960	44	Won
Melissa McCarthy	F	1970	~	56	6927	2015	45	Nom
Matthew McConaughey	M	1969	~	56	6931	2014	45	Won
Patty McCormack	F	1945	~	81	6312	1960	15	Nom
Tim McCoy	M	1891	1978	86	1600	1960	69	~
Joel McCrea	M	1905	1990	84	6901	1960	55	~
Hattie McDaniel	F	1893	1952	59	1719	1960	~	Won
Malcolm McDowell	M	1943	~	83	6714	2012	69	~
George McFarland	M	1928	1993	64	7095	1994	~	~
Ewan McGregor	M	1971	~	54	6840	2024	53	~
Dorothy McGuire	F	1916	2001	85	6933	1960	44	Nom
Victor McLaglen	M	1886	1959	72	1735	1960	~	Won
Steve McQueen	M	1930	1980	50	6834	1986	~	Nom
Donald Meek	M	1878	1946	68	1752	1960	~	~
George Meeker	M	1904	1984	80	6101	1960	56	~
Chris Meledandri	M	1959	~	67	6357	2026	67	Nom
Thomas Meighan	M	1879	1936	57	1719	1960	~	~
Adolphe Menjou	M	1890	1963	73	6826	1960	70	Nom
Burgess Meredith	M	1907	1997	89	6904	1987	80	Nom
Una Merkel	F	1903	1986	82	6262	1960	57	Nom
Ethel Merman	F	1908	1984	76	7044	1960	52	~
Toshiro Mifune	M	1920	1997	77	6912	2016	~	~
Ray Milland	M	1907	1986	79	1621	1960	53	Won
Ann Miller	F	1923	2004	80	6914	1960	37	~
Mary Miles Minter	F	1902	1984	82	1724	1960	58	~
Carmen Miranda	F	1909	1955	46	6262	1960	~	~
Helen Mirren	F	1945	~	81	6714	2013	68	Won
Thomas Mitchell	M	1892	1962	70	1651	1960	68	Won
Robert Mitchum	M	1917	1997	79	6240	1984	67	Nom
Tom Mix	M	1880	1940	60	1708	1960	~	~
Marilyn Monroe	F	1926	1962	36	6774	1960	34	~
Robert Montgomery	M	1904	1981	77	6440	1960	56	Nom
Colleen Moore	F	1899	1988	88	1549	1960	61	~
Constance Moore	F	1921	2005	84	6270	1960	39	~
Dudley Moore	M	1935	2002	66	7000	1987	52	Nom
Grace Moore	F	1898	1947	48	6274	1960	~	Nom
Juanita Moore	F	1914	2014	99	6100	2024	~	Nom
Julianne Moore	F	1960	~	65	6250	2013	53	Won
Matt Moore	M	1888	1960	72	6301	1960	72	~
Owen Moore	M	1886	1939	52	6727	1960	~	~
Roger Moore	M	1927	2017	89	7007	2007	80	~
Terry Moore	F	1929	~	97	7076	1994	65	Nom
Tom Moore	M	1883	1955	71	1640	1960	~	~
Victor Moore	M	1876	1962	86	6834	1960	84	~
Agnes Moorehead	F	1900	1974	73	1719	1960	60	Nom
Polly Moran	F	1883	1952	68	6300	1960	~	~
Antonio Moreno	M	1887	1967	79	6651	1960	73	~
Rita Moreno	F	1931	~	94	7080	1995	64	Won
Frank Morgan	M	1890	1949	59	1708	1960	~	Nom
Michèle Morgan	F	1920	2016	96	1645	1960	40	~
Ralph Morgan	M	1883	1956	72	1617	1960	~	~
Pat Morita	M	1932	2005	73	6633	1994	62	Nom
Jack Mulhall	M	1887	1979	91	1724	1960	73	~
Paul Muni	M	1895	1967	71	6433	1960	65	Won
Ona Munson	F	1903	1955	51	6250	1960	~	~
Audie Murphy	M	1925	1971	45	1601	1960	35	~
Eddie Murphy	M	1961	~	65	7000	1996	35	Nom
George Murphy	M	1902	1992	89	1601	1960	58	~
Charlie Murray	M	1872	1941	69	1719	1960	~	~
Don Murray	M	1929	2024	94	6385	1960	31	Nom
Mae Murray	F	1885	1965	79	6318	1960	75	~
Carmel Myers	F	1899	1980	81	1751	1960	61	~
Mike Myers	M	1963	~	63	7046	2002	39	~
Conrad Nagel	M	1897	1970	72	1719	1960	63	~
Nita Naldi	F	1894	1961	66	6316	1960	66	~
Alla Nazimova	F	1879	1945	66	6933	1960	~	~
Patricia Neal	F	1926	2010	84	7018	2005	79	Won
Franco Nero	M	1941	~	84	1611	2026	84	~
Pola Negri	F	1897	1987	90	6140	1960	63	~
Gene Nelson	M	1920	1996	76	7005	1990	70	~
Paul Newman	M	1925	2008	83	7060	1994	69	Won
Jack Nicholson	M	1937	~	89	6925	1996	59	Won
Leslie Nielsen	M	1926	2010	84	6541	1988	62	~
Anna Q. Nilsson	F	1890	1974	83	6150	1960	70	~
Leonard Nimoy	M	1931	2015	83	6651	1985	54	~
David Niven	M	1910	1983	73	6384	1960	50	Won
Marian Nixon	F	1904	1983	78	1724	1960	56	~
Nick Nolte	M	1941	~	85	6433	2017	76	Nom
Mabel Normand	F	1894	1930	35	6821	1960	~	~
Chuck Norris	M	1940	2026	86	7000	1989	49	~
Kim Novak	F	1933	~	93	6332	1960	27	~
Ramon Novarro	M	1899	1968	69	6350	1960	61	~
Dave O'Brien	M	1912	1969	57	6251	1960	48	~
Edmond O'Brien	M	1915	1985	69	1725	1960	45	Won
Eugene O'Brien	M	1880	1966	85	1620	1960	80	~
George O'Brien	M	1899	1985	86	6201	1960	61	~
Margaret O'Brien	F	1937	~	89	6606	1960	23	~
Pat O'Brien	M	1899	1983	83	1531	1960	61	~
Donald O'Connor	M	1925	2003	78	1680	1960	35	~
Molly O'Day	F	1909	1998	87	1708	1960	49	~
George O'Hanlon	M	1912	1989	76	6428	1960	48	~
Maureen O'Hara	F	1920	2015	95	7004	1960	40	~
Ryan O'Neal	M	1941	2023	82	7057	2021	79	Nom
Henry O'Neill	M	1891	1961	69	6801	1960	69	~
Maureen O'Sullivan	F	1911	1998	87	6541	1991	80	~
Jack Oakie	M	1903	1978	74	6752	1960	57	Nom
Merle Oberon	F	1911	1979	68	6274	1960	49	Nom
Edna May Oliver	F	1883	1942	59	1623	1960	~	Nom
Laurence Olivier	M	1907	1989	82	6319	1960	53	Won
Edward James Olmos	M	1947	~	79	7021	1992	45	Nom
Anita Page	F	1910	2008	98	6116	1960	50	~
Janis Paige	F	1922	2024	101	6624	1960	38	~
Eugene Pallette	M	1889	1954	65	6702	1960	~	~
Gwyneth Paltrow	F	1972	~	54	6931	2010	38	Won
Franklin Pangborn	M	1889	1958	69	1500	1960	~	~
Eleanor Parker	F	1922	2013	91	6340	1960	38	Nom
Jean Parker	F	1915	2005	90	6666	1960	45	~
Helen Parrish	F	1924	1959	34	6263	1960	~	~
Katina Paxinou	F	1900	1973	72	1651	1960	60	Won
John Payne	M	1912	1989	77	6125	1960	48	~
Gregory Peck	M	1916	2003	87	6100	1960	44	Won
George Peppard	M	1928	1994	65	6675	1985	57	~
Anthony Perkins	M	1932	1992	60	6821	1960	28	Nom
Jack Perrin	M	1896	1967	71	1777	1960	64	~
House Peters	M	1880	1967	87	6157	1960	80	~
Susan Peters	F	1921	1952	31	1601	1960	~	Nom
Olga Petrova	F	1884	1977	93	6562	1960	76	~
Michelle Pfeiffer	F	1958	~	68	6801	2007	49	Nom
Dorothy Phillips	F	1889	1980	90	6358	1960	71	~
Jack Pickford	M	1896	1933	36	1523	1960	~	~
Mary Pickford	F	1892	1979	87	6280	1960	68	Won
Walter Pidgeon	M	1897	1984	87	6414	1960	63	Nom
ZaSu Pitts	F	1894	1963	69	6554	1960	66	~
Sidney Poitier	M	1927	2022	94	7065	1994	67	Won
Snub Pollard	M	1889	1962	72	6415	1960	71	~
David Powell	M	1883	1925	41	1651	1960	~	~
Dick Powell	M	1904	1963	58	6915	1960	56	~
Eleanor Powell	F	1912	1982	69	1541	1984	~	~
Jane Powell	F	1929	2021	92	6818	1960	31	~
William Powell	M	1892	1984	91	1636	1960	68	Nom
Tyrone Power	M	1914	1958	44	6747	1960	~	~
Chris Pratt	M	1979	~	47	6834	2017	38	~
Marie Prevost	F	1896	1937	40	6201	1960	~	~
Vincent Price	M	1911	1993	82	6201	1960	49	~
Aileen Pringle	F	1895	1989	94	6723	1960	65	~
Richard Pryor	M	1940	2005	65	6438	1993	53	~
Denver Pyle	M	1920	1997	77	7083	1997	77	~
Dennis Quaid	M	1954	~	72	7018	2005	51	~
Randy Quaid	M	1950	~	76	7000	2003	53	Nom
Anthony Quinn	M	1915	2001	86	6251	1960	45	Won
Daniel Radcliffe	M	1989	~	37	6801	2015	26	~
George Raft	M	1901	1980	79	6159	1960	59	~
Luise Rainer	F	1910	2014	104	6302	1960	50	Won
Ella Raines	F	1920	1988	67	7021	1960	40	~
Claude Rains	M	1889	1967	77	6400	1960	71	Nom
Esther Ralston	F	1902	1994	91	6664	1960	58	~
Vera Ralston	F	1919	2003	83	1752	1960	41	~
Marjorie Rambeau	F	1889	1970	80	6336	1960	71	Nom
Basil Rathbone	M	1892	1967	75	6549	1960	68	Nom
Gregory Ratoff	M	1893	1960	67	6100	1960	67	~
Herbert Rawlinson	M	1885	1953	67	6150	1960	~	~
Charles Ray	M	1891	1943	52	6355	1960	~	~
Martha Raye	F	1916	1994	78	6251	1960	44	~
Gene Raymond	M	1908	1998	89	7001	1960	52	~
Donna Reed	F	1921	1986	64	1612	1960	39	Won
Christopher Reeve	M	1952	2004	52	7021	1997	45	~
Keanu Reeves	M	1964	~	62	6801	2005	41	~
Wallace Reid	M	1891	1923	31	6617	1960	~	~
Rob Reiner	M	1947	2025	78	6421	1999	52	~
Lee Remick	F	1935	1991	55	6104	1991	55	Nom
Burt Reynolds	M	1936	2018	82	6838	1978	42	Nom
Debbie Reynolds	F	1932	2016	84	6423	1960	28	Nom
Ryan Reynolds	M	1976	~	49	6801	2016	40	~
Irene Rich	F	1891	1988	96	6225	1960	69	~
Christina Ricci	F	1980	~	45	6258	2025	45	~
Tim Robbins	M	1958	~	68	6801	2008	50	Won
Theodore Roberts	M	1861	1928	67	6166	1960	~	~
Cliff Robertson	M	1923	2011	88	6801	1986	63	Won
Paul Robeson	M	1898	1976	77	6660	1978	~	~
Edward G. Robinson	M	1893	1973	79	6235	1960	67	~
Chris Rock	M	1965	~	61	7021	2003	38	~
Buddy Rogers	M	1904	1999	94	6135	1960	56	~
Ginger Rogers	F	1911	1995	83	6772	1960	49	Won
Roy Rogers	M	1911	1998	86	1752	1960	49	~
Will Rogers	M	1879	1935	55	6401	1960	~	~
Gilbert Roland	M	1905	1994	88	6730	1960	55	~
Ruth Roland	F	1892	1937	45	6260	1960	~	~
Cesar Romero	M	1907	1994	86	6615	1960	53	~
Mickey Rooney	M	1920	2014	93	1718	1960	40	Nom
Lillian Roth	F	1910	1980	69	6330	1960	50	~
Alma Rubens	F	1897	1931	33	6409	1960	~	~
Paul Rudd	M	1969	~	57	6834	2015	46	~
Mark Ruffalo	M	1967	~	58	6777	2024	56	Nom
Charlie Ruggles	M	1886	1970	84	6264	1960	74	~
Gail Russell	F	1924	1961	36	6933	1960	36	~
Harold Russell	M	1914	2002	88	6752	1960	46	Won
Jane Russell	F	1921	2011	89	6850	1960	39	~
Kurt Russell	M	1951	~	75	6201	2017	66	~
Rosalind Russell	F	1907	1976	69	1708	1960	53	Nom
Ann Rutherford	F	1917	2012	94	6834	1960	43	~
Winona Ryder	F	1971	~	54	7018	2000	29	Nom
Sabu	M	1924	1963	39	6251	1960	36	~
Eva Marie Saint	F	1924	2026	102	6624	1960	36	Won
Zoe Saldaña	F	1978	~	48	6920	2018	39	Won
George Sanders	M	1906	1972	65	1636	1960	54	Won
Adam Sandler	M	1966	~	60	6262	2011	45	~
Susan Sarandon	F	1946	~	80	6801	2002	56	Won
Telly Savalas	M	1922	1994	72	6801	1983	61	Nom
Joseph Schildkraut	M	1896	1964	67	6780	1960	64	Won
Arnold Schwarzenegger	M	1947	~	79	6764	1987	40	~
Lizabeth Scott	F	1922	2015	92	1624	1960	38	~
Randolph Scott	M	1898	1987	89	6243	1960	62	~
Zachary Scott	M	1914	1965	51	6349	1960	46	~
Dorothy Sebastian	F	1903	1957	53	6655	1960	~	~
Tom Selleck	M	1945	~	81	6925	1986	41	~
Larry Semon	M	1889	1928	39	6933	1960	~	~
Norma Shearer	F	1902	1983	80	6636	1960	58	Won
Charlie Sheen	M	1965	~	61	7021	1994	29	~
Martin Sheen	M	1940	~	86	1500	1989	49	~
Ann Sheridan	F	1915	1967	51	7024	1960	45	~
Anne Shirley	F	1918	1993	75	7018	1960	42	Nom
Sylvia Sidney	F	1910	1999	88	6245	1960	50	Nom
Milton Sills	M	1882	1930	48	6263	1960	~	~
Frank Sinatra	M	1915	1998	82	1600	1960	45	Won
Penny Singleton	F	1908	2003	95	6547	1960	52	~
C. Aubrey Smith	M	1863	1948	85	6327	1960	~	~
Jimmy Smits	M	1955	~	70	6100	2021	66	~
Wesley Snipes	M	1962	~	64	7018	1998	36	~
Ann Sothern	F	1909	2001	92	1612	1960	51	Nom
Sissy Spacek	F	1949	~	76	6834	2011	62	Won
Kevin Spacey	M	1959	~	67	6801	1999	40	Won
David Spade	M	1964	~	62	7018	2003	39	~
Octavia Spencer	F	1970	~	56	6623	2022	52	Won
Al St. John	M	1893	1963	69	6313	1960	67	~
Robert Stack	M	1919	2003	84	7001	1960	41	Nom
Sylvester Stallone	M	1946	~	80	6712	1984	38	Nom
Barbara Stanwyck	F	1907	1990	82	1751	1960	53	Nom
Pauline Starke	F	1901	1977	76	6125	1960	59	~
Mary Steenburgen	F	1953	~	73	7021	2009	56	Won
Rod Steiger	M	1925	2002	77	7080	1997	72	Won
Ford Sterling	M	1883	1939	55	6612	1960	~	~
Jan Sterling	F	1921	2004	82	6638	1960	39	Nom
Onslow Stevens	M	1902	1977	74	6349	1960	58	~
Anita Stewart	F	1895	1961	66	6724	1960	65	~
James Stewart	M	1908	1997	89	1708	1960	52	Won
Dean Stockwell	M	1936	2021	85	7000	1992	56	Nom
Fred Stone	M	1873	1959	85	1634	1960	~	~
George E. Stone	M	1903	1967	64	6932	1960	57	~
Lewis Stone	M	1879	1953	73	6526	1960	~	Nom
Sharon Stone	F	1958	~	68	6925	1995	37	Nom
Edith Storey	F	1892	1967	75	1523	1960	68	~
Lee Strasberg	M	1901	1982	80	6757	1977	76	Nom
Meryl Streep	F	1949	~	77	7018	1998	49	Won
Barbra Streisand	F	1942	~	84	6915	1976	34	Won
Gloria Stuart	F	1910	2010	100	6714	2000	90	Nom
Margaret Sullavan	F	1909	1960	50	1751	1960	51	Nom
Barry Sullivan	M	1912	1994	81	6160	1960	48	~
Slim Summerville	M	1892	1946	53	6409	1960	~	~
Donald Sutherland	M	1935	2024	88	7024	2011	76	~
Mack Swain	M	1876	1935	59	1500	1960	~	~
Hilary Swank	F	1974	~	52	6925	2007	33	Won
Gloria Swanson	F	1899	1983	84	6750	1960	61	Nom
Patrick Swayze	M	1952	2009	57	7021	1997	45	~
Blanche Sweet	F	1896	1986	90	1751	1960	64	~
Mabel Taliaferro	F	1887	1979	91	6720	1960	73	~
Constance Talmadge	F	1898	1973	75	6300	1960	62	~
Norma Talmadge	F	1894	1957	63	1500	1960	~	~
Akim Tamiroff	M	1899	1972	72	1634	1960	61	Nom
Jessica Tandy	F	1909	1994	85	6284	1960	51	Won
Elizabeth Taylor	F	1932	2011	79	6336	1960	28	Won
Estelle Taylor	F	1894	1958	63	1620	1960	~	~
Kent Taylor	M	1907	1987	79	1645	1960	53	~
Robert Taylor	M	1911	1969	57	1500	1960	49	~
Shirley Temple	F	1928	2014	85	1500	1960	32	~
Alice Terry	F	1899	1987	88	6626	1960	61	~
Phyllis Thaxter	F	1919	2012	92	6531	1960	41	~
Charlize Theron	F	1975	~	51	6801	2005	30	Won
Emma Thompson	F	1959	~	67	6714	2010	51	Won
Fred Thomson	M	1890	1928	38	6850	1960	~	~
Billy Bob Thornton	M	1955	~	71	6801	2004	49	Nom
Gene Tierney	F	1920	1991	70	6125	1960	40	Nom
Genevieve Tobin	F	1899	1995	95	6119	1960	61	~
Thelma Todd	F	1906	1935	29	6262	1960	~	~
Franchot Tone	M	1905	1968	63	6560	1960	55	Nom
Regis Toomey	M	1898	1991	93	7021	1960	62	~
David Torrence	M	1864	1951	87	6564	1958	~	~
Ernest Torrence	M	1878	1933	54	6801	1960	~	~
Lee Tracy	M	1898	1968	70	1638	1960	62	Nom
Spencer Tracy	M	1900	1967	67	6814	1960	60	Won
John Travolta	M	1954	~	72	6901	1985	31	Nom
Arthur Treacher	M	1894	1975	81	6274	1960	66	~
Claire Trevor	F	1910	2000	90	6933	1960	50	Won
Stanley Tucci	M	1960	~	65	6930	2026	65	Nom
Forrest Tucker	M	1919	1986	67	6385	1986	67	~
Tom Tully	M	1908	1982	73	6119	1960	52	Nom
Glynn Turman	M	1947	~	79	7065	2025	78	~
Lana Turner	F	1921	1995	74	6241	1960	39	Nom
Ben Turpin	M	1869	1940	70	1651	1960	~	~
Helen Twelvetrees	F	1908	1958	49	6263	1960	~	~
Cicely Tyson	F	1924	2021	96	7080	1997	73	Nom
Rudolph Valentino	M	1895	1926	31	6164	1960	~	~
Virginia Valli	F	1898	1968	70	6125	1960	62	~
Mamie Van Doren	F	1931	~	95	7057	1994	63	~
Jo Van Fleet	F	1915	1996	80	7010	1960	45	Won
Robert Vaughn	M	1932	2016	83	6633	1998	66	Nom
Vince Vaughn	M	1970	~	55	6201	2024	53	~
Lupe Vélez	F	1908	1944	36	6927	1960	~	~
Evelyn Venable	F	1913	1993	80	1500	1960	47	~
Vera-Ellen	F	1921	1981	60	7083	1960	39	~
Bobby Vernon	M	1897	1939	42	6825	1960	~	~
Helen Vinson	F	1907	1999	92	1560	1960	53	~
Erich von Stroheim	M	1885	1957	71	6826	1960	~	Nom
Mark Wahlberg	M	1971	~	55	6259	2010	39	Nom
Robert Walker	M	1918	1951	32	1709	1960	~	~
Henry B. Walthall	M	1878	1936	58	6201	1960	~	~
Christoph Waltz	M	1956	~	70	6667	2014	58	Won
H. B. Warner	M	1875	1958	83	6600	1960	~	Nom
Ruth Warrick	F	1916	2005	88	6689	1960	44	~
Naomi Watts	F	1968	~	58	6201	2025	57	Nom
John Wayne	M	1907	1979	72	1541	1960	53	Won
Sigourney Weaver	F	1949	~	77	7021	1999	50	Nom
Clifton Webb	M	1889	1966	76	6850	1960	71	Nom
Raquel Welch	F	1940	2023	82	7021	1996	56	~
Orson Welles	M	1915	1985	70	1600	1960	45	Nom
Mae West	F	1893	1980	87	1560	1960	67	~
Forest Whitaker	M	1961	~	65	6801	2007	46	Won
Alice White	F	1906	1983	76	1511	1960	54	~
Pearl White	F	1889	1938	49	6838	1960	~	~
Stuart Whitman	M	1928	2020	92	7083	1998	70	Nom
Richard Widmark	M	1914	2008	93	6800	1960	46	Nom
Henry Wilcoxon	M	1905	1984	78	6256	1960	55	~
Cornel Wilde	M	1912	1989	77	1635	1960	48	Nom
Warren William	M	1894	1948	53	1559	1960	~	~
Billy Dee Williams	M	1937	~	89	1521	1985	48	~
Earle Williams	M	1880	1927	47	1560	1960	~	~
Esther Williams	F	1921	2013	91	1560	1960	39	~
Kathlyn Williams	F	1879	1960	81	7038	1960	81	~
Robin Williams	M	1951	2014	63	6925	1990	39	Won
Bruce Willis	M	1955	~	71	6915	2006	51	~
Chill Wills	M	1902	1978	76	6923	1960	58	Nom
Lois Wilson	F	1894	1988	93	6933	1960	66	~
Marie Wilson	F	1916	1972	56	6601	1960	44	~
Rita Wilson	F	1956	~	69	7024	2019	62	~
Claire Windsor	F	1892	1972	80	7021	1960	68	~
Marie Windsor	F	1919	2000	80	1549	1983	64	~
Toby Wing	F	1915	2001	85	6561	1960	45	~
Kate Winslet	F	1975	~	51	6262	2014	39	Won
Shelley Winters	F	1920	2006	85	1752	1960	40	Won
Jane Withers	F	1926	2021	95	6119	1960	34	~
Reese Witherspoon	F	1976	~	50	6262	2010	34	Won
Anna May Wong	F	1905	1961	56	1708	1960	55	~
Natalie Wood	F	1938	1981	43	7000	1987	~	Nom
James Woods	M	1947	~	79	7021	1998	51	Nom
Joanne Woodward	F	1930	~	96	6801	1960	29	Won
Monty Woolley	M	1888	1963	74	6542	1960	72	Nom
Fay Wray	F	1907	2004	96	6349	1960	53	~
Teresa Wright	F	1918	2005	86	1680	1960	42	Won
Jane Wyman	F	1917	2007	90	6607	1960	43	Won
Ed Wynn	M	1886	1966	79	1541	1960	74	Nom
Michael York	M	1942	~	84	6385	2002	60	~
Clara Kimball Young	F	1890	1960	70	6513	1960	70	~
Loretta Young	F	1913	2000	87	6100	1960	47	Won
Robert Young	M	1907	1998	91	6933	1960	53	~
Michelle Yeoh	F	1962	~	63	6927	2026	63	Won
Renée Zellweger	F	1969	~	57	7000	2005	36	Won

== See also ==
- List of all stars on the Hollywood Walk of Fame
- List of all actors with Academy Award nominations
