= Captain Jenks' Dilemma =

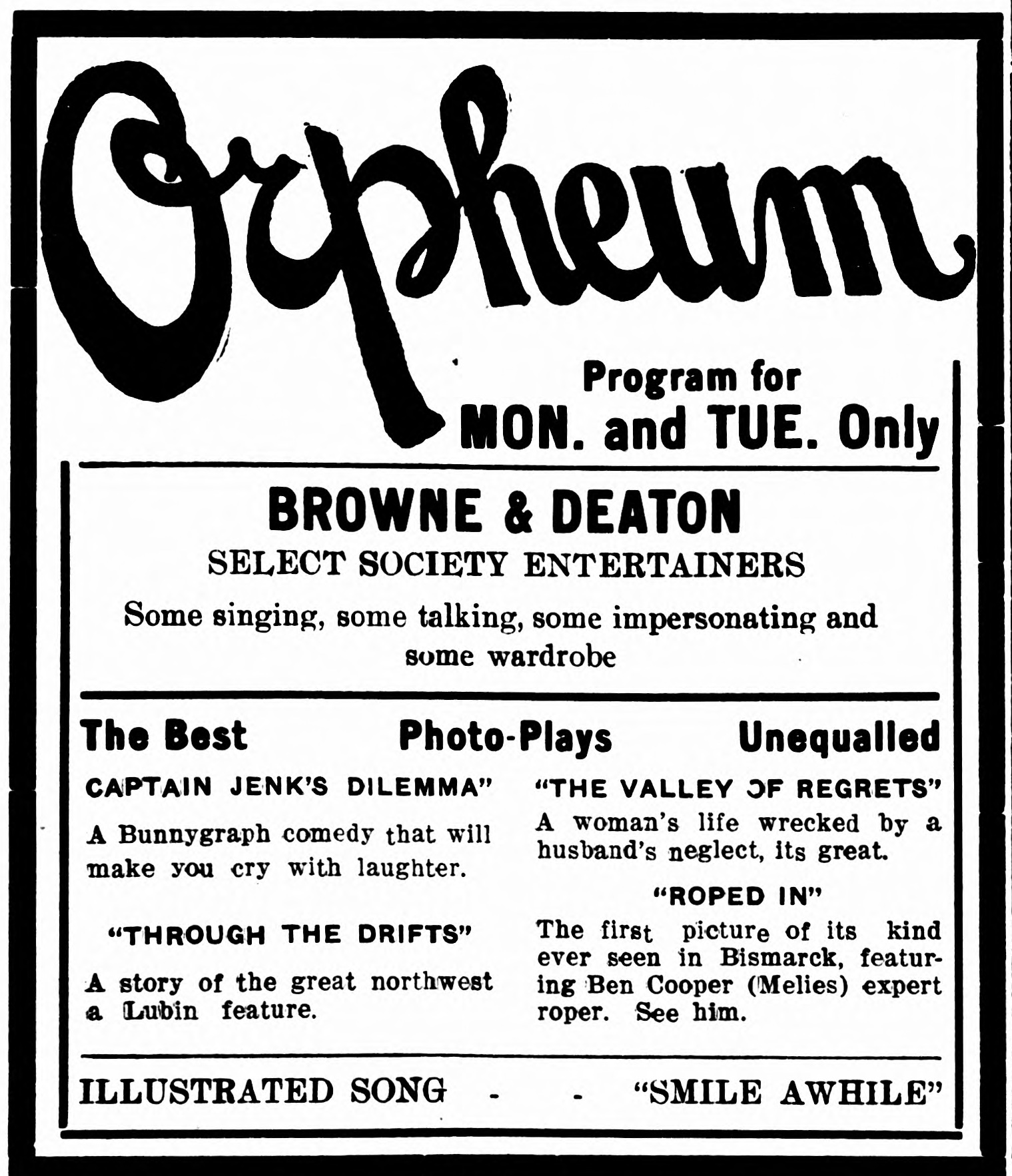
- Newspaper advertisement for the film and others
- Written by: W. A. Tremayne (story)
- Produced by: Vitagraph Company of America
- Starring: John Bunny; Julia Swayne Gordon
- Distributed by: General Film Company
- Release date: January 8, 1912
- Running time: 1 reel
- Country: USA
- Language: Silent..English titles

Captain Jenks' Dilemma is a 1912 silent comedy short film produced by the Vitagraph Company of America and distributed through the General Film Company. It starred John Bunny and Julia Swayne Gordon. Also in the cast were Dolores and Helene Costello.

The film survives in the Library of Congress.

== Cast ==
- John Bunny - Captain Jenks
- Julia Swayne Gordon - Mrs. Brown, A Widow
- Charles Eldridge - Sir Brian Squills
- Kenneth Casey - One of Widow Brown's Children
- Dolores Costello - One of Widow Brown's Children
- Helene Costello - One of Widow Brown's Children
