= Bunny as a Reporter =

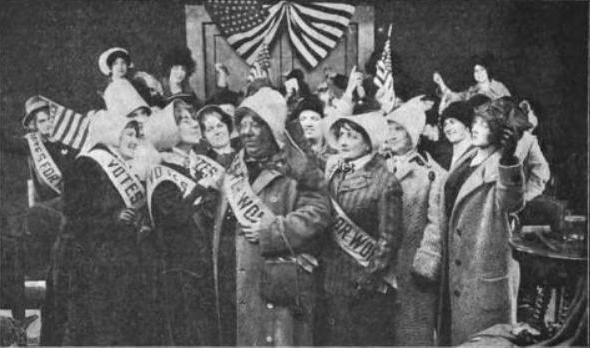
- Directed by: Wilfrid North
- Written by: Beta Breuil
- Starring: John Bunny; Flora Finch
- Distributed by: Vitagraph
- Release date: June 3, 1913
- Running time: 728 ft
- Country: United States
- Languages: Silent; English intertitles

Bunny as a Reporter is an American silent comedy film.

== Plot summary ==
Bunny, an amateur reporter, wants to impress the editor of a small-town newspaper, so he disguises himself as a woman and infiltrates a secret suffragette meeting.

== Release ==
Bunny as a Reporter was released on June 3, 1913, in the United States, where it was presented as a split-reel with another Vitagraph comedy, Three to One. It was released in London September 18, 1913.

== Cast ==
- John Bunny as Bunny
- Flora Finch as Leader of the Suffragettes
- Charles Eldridge as Editor
- Tom Sutton as Farmer
