= Hearts and Diamonds (1914 film) =

- Directed by: George D. Baker
- Starring: John Bunny; Flora Finch
- Release date: 26 September 1914
- Running time: 33 minutes
- Country: United States
- Language: English

Hearts and Diamonds is a 1914 American silent short film directed by George D. Baker. A print of this film exists.

== Cast ==
- John Bunny - Widower Tupper
- Flora Finch - Miss Rachel Whipple
- Ethel Lloyd - Tupper's Daughter
- Ethel Corcoran - Tupper's Daughter
- Charles Eldridge - Toper Staggs - The Uncle
- William Shea - Uncle William
