= A Cure for Pokeritis =

1912 film

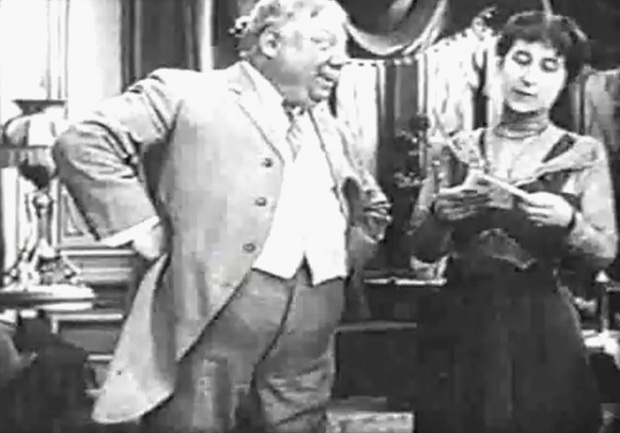
- John Bunny and Flora Finch as George and Mary Brown
- Directed by: Laurence Trimble
- Starring: John Bunny; Flora Finch
- Production company: Vitagraph Company of America
- Distributed by: General Film Company
- Release date: February 23, 1912
- Running time: 13 minutes
- Country: United States
- Languages: Silent film English intertitles

A Cure for Pokeritis is a 1912 short silent film starring John Bunny and Flora Finch. After Bunny's death in 1915, a re-release was announced with the alternative title A Sure Cure for Pokeritis. The film, a domestic comedy, depicts a woman who stops her husband's gambling habit by having her cousin stage a fake police raid on his weekly poker game. It was one of many similar shorts produced by Vitagraph Studios—one-reel comedies starring Bunny and Finch in a domestic setting, known popularly as "Bunnygraphs" or "Bunnyfinches"—whose popularity made Bunny and Finch early film stars. The film has been recognized as an historically important representative of its period and genre.

== Plot ==
Upon returning home from an evening spent losing at poker, George Brown swears off gambling forever. However, his friend Bigelow convinces him to secretly continue attending the weekly poker game and to tell his wife Mary that he has been admitted to the Sons of the Morning, a fraternal lodge, to explain his absences. When George sleep-talks, she becomes suspicious and has her cousin Freddie Dewdrop follow him, allowing her to learn the truth. Together with the wives of the other poker players, she enacts a plan to end the gambling. Freddie and the members of his Bible study group dress up as police officers and raid the game. The gamblers' wives then arrive, and the "police" leave the men to be scolded, purportedly in place of being arrested. As the film ends, the Browns reconcile.

== Cast ==
It is not entirely clear what the names of the characters played by Bunny and Finch were intended to be. In the film, the letter written to gather the wives together identifies the two main characters as Mary and George Brown. However, a cast list in Vitagraph's in-house publication refers to the main characters as Mr. and Mrs. Bunny Sharpe, while "Mr. Brown" is given as the name of a minor character.

- John Bunny as Mr. Bunny Sharpe / George Brown
- Flora Finch as Mrs. Bunny Sharpe / Mary Brown
- Charles Eldridge as Bunny's friend Bigelow
- Harold Wilson as another friend
- Rose Tapley as Bigelow's wife
- Leah Baird as another friend's wife
- Harry T. Morey as Freddie Dewdrop
- Tom Powers as Freddie's chum
- James Morrison as Freddie's chum
- William R. Dunn as Mr. Brown
- Arthur Rosson as the costumer

== Production ==
A Cure For Pokeritis (1912)

A Cure for Pokeritis was one of many Vitagraph's one-reel or shorter comedies starring Bunny and Finch in a domestic setting, known popularly as "Bunnygraphs" or "Bunnyfinches". The number of these shorts that were originally produced is unknown because Vitagraph's films were generally not archived. Estimates vary considerably; totals in excess of 150, 200, or 260 have been proposed. Most of the studio's films are now considered lost.

The film was an early example of efforts to move beyond theater blocking conventions. During the police raid, depth was demonstrated by having action take place in both the foreground and the background, and by allowing actors to move between the spaces. This cinematography technique lent realism to the scene, and improved its pacing.

== Exhibition ==
In the silent era, movies were accompanied by a variety of live and recorded music. Depending on the film and the venue, the music might have been the performance of a live pianist or orchestra, recorded music, or absent entirely. Some pictures were distributed with cue sheets indicating when music was to be played, or anthologies of specific songs to use as accompaniment. Especially between 1910 and 1912, these selections were often popular music, chosen because the song's title or lyrics related to the film in some way, in contrast to later efforts to provide music with appropriate texture. Beginning in 1910, Vitagraph provided lists of this nature for all of their films.

=== Music ===
Vitagraph's recommended music for A Cure for Pokeritis began with "I'm Glad I'm Married" (Note: Music by Albert Von Tilzer; lyrics by Jack Norworth.) and "I've Got My Eyes on You". (Note: Music by Theodore F. Morse; lyrics by F. W. Hager and J. Ringelben.) The studio suggested either "I Don't Believe You" (Note: Music by Harry Von Tilzer; lyrics by William Dillon.) or "I'm an Honorary Member of the Patsy Club" (Note: Music by Harry Von Tilzer; lyrics by Andrew B. Sterling.) be played as George presented his purported lodge membership. His sleep-talking was to be accompanied by "If You Talk in Your Sleep, Don't Mention My Name", (Note: Music by Nat D. Ayer; lyrics by A. Seymour Brown; published by Jerome H. Remick.) followed by "Back to the Factory, Mary" (Note: Music and lyrics by Clarence Gaskill.) as Freddie investigates. "Whoops, My Dear" (Note: Music by Bert F. Grant; lyrics by Billy J. Morrissey; published by Jerome H. Remick.) was to score the police raid, and "Don't Take Me Home" (Note: Music by Harry Von Tilzer; lyrics by Vincent P. Bryan.) would play as the film ended.

== Reception and legacy ==
The Bunnygraphs, as a genre, were representative of the cinema of the period, and were very successful, making Bunny the first American comic film star and Finch the first female star comedian. A Cure for Pokeritis, released February 23, 1912, was individually well-received, including in showings outside the United States. The Thames Star, a New Zealand newspaper, described the film as "screamingly funny". After John Bunny's death, interest in his films led Vitagraph in 1917 to announce the re-release of this film (retitled A Sure Cure for Pokeritis), along with many of his other works, as "Favorite Film Features". However, the comedy style of A Cure for Pokeritis has not aged well, especially in contrast to Mack Sennett's slapstick films and the works of later comedians such as Charlie Chaplin and Buster Keaton. According to film scholars Donald McCaffrey and Christopher Jacobs, modern viewers "will hardly get a flicker of a smile" from the film, despite the skill of its actors.

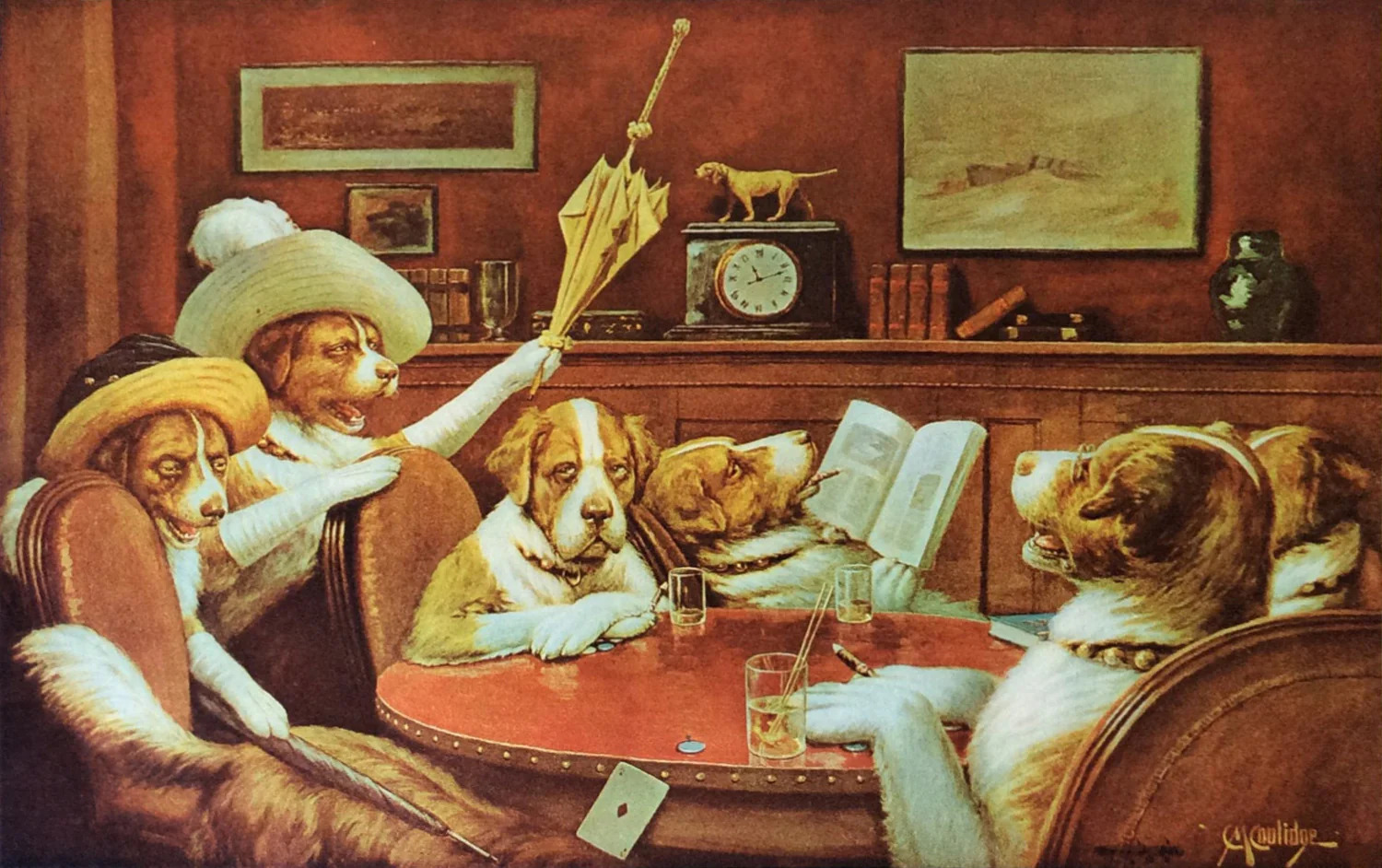
Coolidge's Sitting up with a Sick Friend from the Dogs Playing Poker series depicts a similar event, but with anthropomorphized dog characters.

The film's themes and its relationship to later works have been the subject of critical analysis. A Cure for Pokeritis may be the first depiction of poker in film, and provides insight into the public's perception of the game at the time as a male-dominated societal ill. (Note: At the time, gambling was seen as so immoral that in many states, gambling debts were legally unenforceable. E.g., Menardi v. Wacker, 32 Nev. 169, 105 P. 287, 288 (1909): “A check given for a gambling debt is void under the law of this state, and, there being no valid obligation, there could be no lawful consideration for the security as a pledge.”) This attitude, and a scene similar to the film's plot, is also present in Cassius Marcellus Coolidge's painting Sitting up with a Sick Friend, part of the Dogs Playing Poker series commissioned in 1903. A Cure for Pokeritis has been compared to sitcoms of both the 1940s and the end of the 20th century. Film historian Wes Gehring of Ball State University considers George to be a forerunner of the modern antihero archetype and compares the Browns to Laurel and Hardy. Other authors have examined the film's gender issues. Gerald Mast wrote that the comedic aspects overlaid a conflict between masculinity and moralist or feminist values. Brunel University lecturer Geoff King viewed the male lead's efforts to escape from an "imprisoning" wife to be a recurring theme in silent comedy, and film reviewer Peter Nash found the "fastidious and effeminate" Freddie an example of a contemporary gay stock character.

In 2011, this film was selected for preservation in the United States National Film Registry by the Library of Congress as being a "culturally, historically, or aesthetically significant" representative of the Bunnygraph films.

== Home media ==
A Cure for Pokeritis is in the public domain and so is widely available, including online. In 1998, Kino International included it in Slapstick Encyclopedia, an eight-volume VHS collection of silent films that was re-released in 2002 as a five-disc DVD collection by Image Entertainment.

== Bibliography ==
- Altman R. (2001). "Cinema and Popular Song: The Lost Tradition". In Wojcik PR, Knight A. (ed.). Soundtrack Available: Essays on Film and Popular Music. Duke University Press. ISBN 978-0-8223-2800-1.
- Altman R. (2007). Silent Film Sound. Film and Culture. Columbia University Press. ISBN 978-0-231-11663-3.
- Brewster B. (2005). "Vitagraph Company of America". In Abel R. (ed.). Encyclopedia of Early Cinema. Routledge. ISBN 978-0-415-23440-5.
- Cullen F. (2006). Vaudeville, Old and New: An Encyclopedia of Variety Performers in America. Routledge. ISBN 978-0-415-93853-2.
- Gehring WD. (2004). Leo McCarey: From Marx to McCarthy. The Scarecrow Filmmakers. Scarecrow Press. ISBN 978-0-8108-5263-1.
- Jasen DA., ed. (2002). A Century of American Popular Music: 2000 Best-Loved and Remembered Songs (1899–1999). Routledge. p. 93. ISBN 978-0-415-93700-9.
- Keil C. (2002). Early American Cinema in Transition: Story, Style, and Filmmaking, 1907–1913. Wisconsin Studies in Film. University of Wisconsin Press. ISBN 978-0-299-17364-7.
- King G. (2002). Film Comedy. Wallflower Press. ISBN 978-1-903364-35-2.
- Lowe D. (2004). An Encyclopedic Dictionary of Women in Early American Films: 1895–1930. Routledge. ISBN 978-0-7890-1843-4.
- Marks MM. (1997). Music and the Silent Film: Contexts and Case Studies, 1895–1924. Oxford University Press. ISBN 978-0-19-506891-7.
- Mast G. (1979). The Comic Mind: Comedy and the Movies (2nd ed.). University of Chicago Press. ISBN 978-0-226-50978-5.
- McCaffrey D. (1968). 4 Great Comedians: Chaplin, Lloyd, Keaton, Langdon. International Film Guide Series. Zwemmer. OCLC 309961.
- McCaffrey D, Jacobs CP. (1999). Guide to the Silent Years of American Cinema. Reference Guides to the World's Cinema. Greenwood. ISBN 978-0-313-30345-6.
- Slide A, Grevison A. (1987). The Big V: A History of the Vitagraph Company. Scarecrow Press. ISBN 978-0-8108-2030-2.
