= Her Crowning Glory =

1911 film

- PLAY full film; runtime 00:14:18
- Directed by: Laurence Trimble
- Starring: John Bunny
- Distributed by: Vitagraph Company of America
- Release date: September 11, 1911
- Running time: 14 minutes (1 reel, 1000 feet)
- Country: United States
- Languages: Silent; English intertitles

Her Crowning Glory is a 1911 American silent short comedy film directed by Laurence Trimble. The film is preserved by the UCLA Film & Television Archive and is included in the DVD Treasures From American Film Archives program #2, 50 Preserved Films by the National Film Preservation Foundation.

== Cast ==
- John Bunny as Mortimer (uncredited)
- Helene Costello as Helen, the Child (uncredited)
- Mae Costello as The Nurse (uncredited)
- Flora Finch as The Governess (uncredited)
- Edith Halleran as servant/maid (uncredited)
- Kate Price as Amelia, Mortimer's Sister (uncredited)

== See also ==
- 1911 in film
