= John Bunny =

American actor (1863–1915)

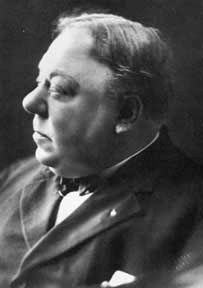
- Born: September 21, 1863; New York, New York, U.S.
- Died: April 26, 1915 (aged 51); New York, New York, U.S.
- Occupation: Actor
- Spouse: Clara Scanlan (m. 1890)
- Relatives: George Bunny (brother)

John Bunny (September 21, 1863 – April 26, 1915) was an American actor. Bunny began his career as a stage actor, but transitioned to a film career after joining Vitagraph Studios around 1910. At Vitagraph, Bunny made over 150 short films – many of them domestic comedies with the comedian Flora Finch – and became one of the most well-known actors of his era.

== Early life and education ==
Bunny was born on September 21, 1863, in Brooklyn, New York, to an English father and an Irish mother. He was educated in New York public schools.

== Career ==
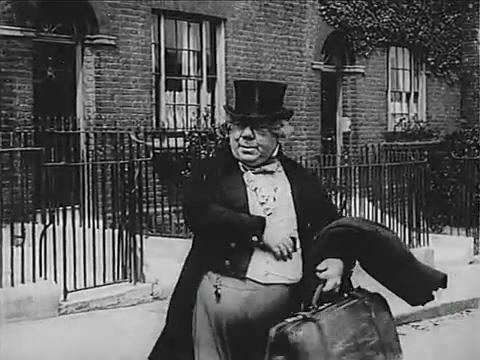
John Bunny in The Pickwick Papers (1913)

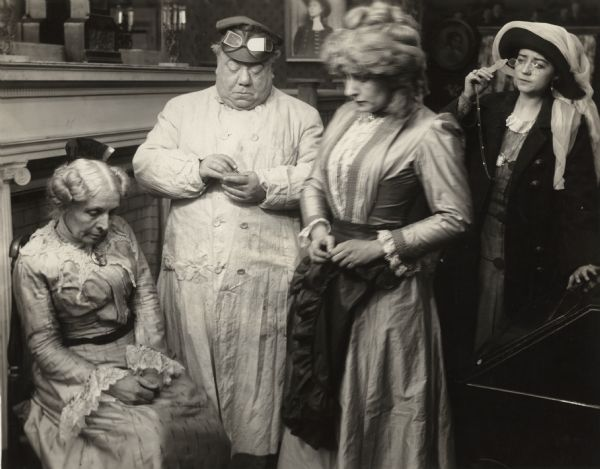
Scene still from Treasure Trove (1911). Left to right are Mary Maurice, John Bunny, Julia Swayne Gordon, and Helen Gardner.

Bunny initially worked as a clerk in a general store before joining a small minstrel show at age 20. In a stage career spanning 25 years, Bunny worked for a number of touring and stock theater companies, with stints in Portland, Seattle, and various cities on the east coast. Bunny eventually worked his way into Broadway, where he was in productions such as Aunt Hannah (1900), Easy Dawson (1905), and the Astor Theatre's inaugural production of A Midsummer Night's Dream (1906), where his performance as Bottom garnered acclaim.

In a 1915 interview, Bunny recounted how he decided to enter the film industry after determining that "it was the 'movies' that were the main cause of the lean times on stage." Bunny offered his services to Vitagraph Studios, but was refused a job because the studio manager believed he could not offer Bunny a high enough salary. Bunny, however, insisted on taking the lower pay and began working at Vitagraph Studios around 1910, (Note: Sources disagree on the exact date Bunny began working for the Vitagraph Company. As summarized by Anthony Slide: "There is considerable question not only as to why [Bunny chose to work at] Vitagraph, but also as to when. According to William Basil Courtney, Bunny's name first appeared on the Vitagraph payroll on October 27, 1910. Albert E. Smith claims Bunny's first Vitagraph film was Doctor Cupid, released on January 10, 1911. Historian and archivist Sam Gill, who has undertaken extensive research into John Bunny's career, believes that his first screen appearance was in Jack Fat and Jim Slim at Coney Island, released on December 2, 1910. The only subject on which there is general agreement is Bunny's initial salary—$40.00 a week.") where he went on to star in over 150 films. At Vitagraph, Bunny was often paired with the comedian Flora Finch, with whom he made many popular comedies – often featuring situational humor in a domestic setting, in contrast with the rowdier slapstick style used in some films at the time – that came to be known as "Bunnygraphs" or "Bunnyfinches". According to the Library of Congress, the Bunnygraph genre was exemplified by A Cure for Pokeritis (1912), which features the efforts of a wife to put a stop to her husband's gambling habit by organizing a fake police raid on his weekly poker game.

Regarding a career as a film actor, Bunny said:

There's nothing like it. No other work gives an actor or would-be actor the same advantages. In the pictures, a player gets fifty-two weeks in the year. Where is the theatrical manager who can offer that? Not even vaudeville stars can get such bookings. At best, thirty weeks is about all an actor can expect on the stage. He may get summer stock work, but even so it is of uncertain duration. Stage work is a gamble. Even when you have been engaged for a production, rehearsed from three to six weeks without pay, and no doubt bought your own costumes for the piece, you have no guarantee that it will be a success. If the public does not set its stamp of approval, your job is all over perhaps after but one performance, and you can only repeat the procedure by trying again with someone else, charging the other to your loss account, with a credit notation probably on the page marked 'experience.'

== Death ==
Bunny had been acting in films for only five years when he died from Bright's disease at his home in Brooklyn on April 26, 1915. He was survived by his wife and two sons and interred in the Cemetery of the Evergreens in Brooklyn, New York.

== Reception and legacy ==
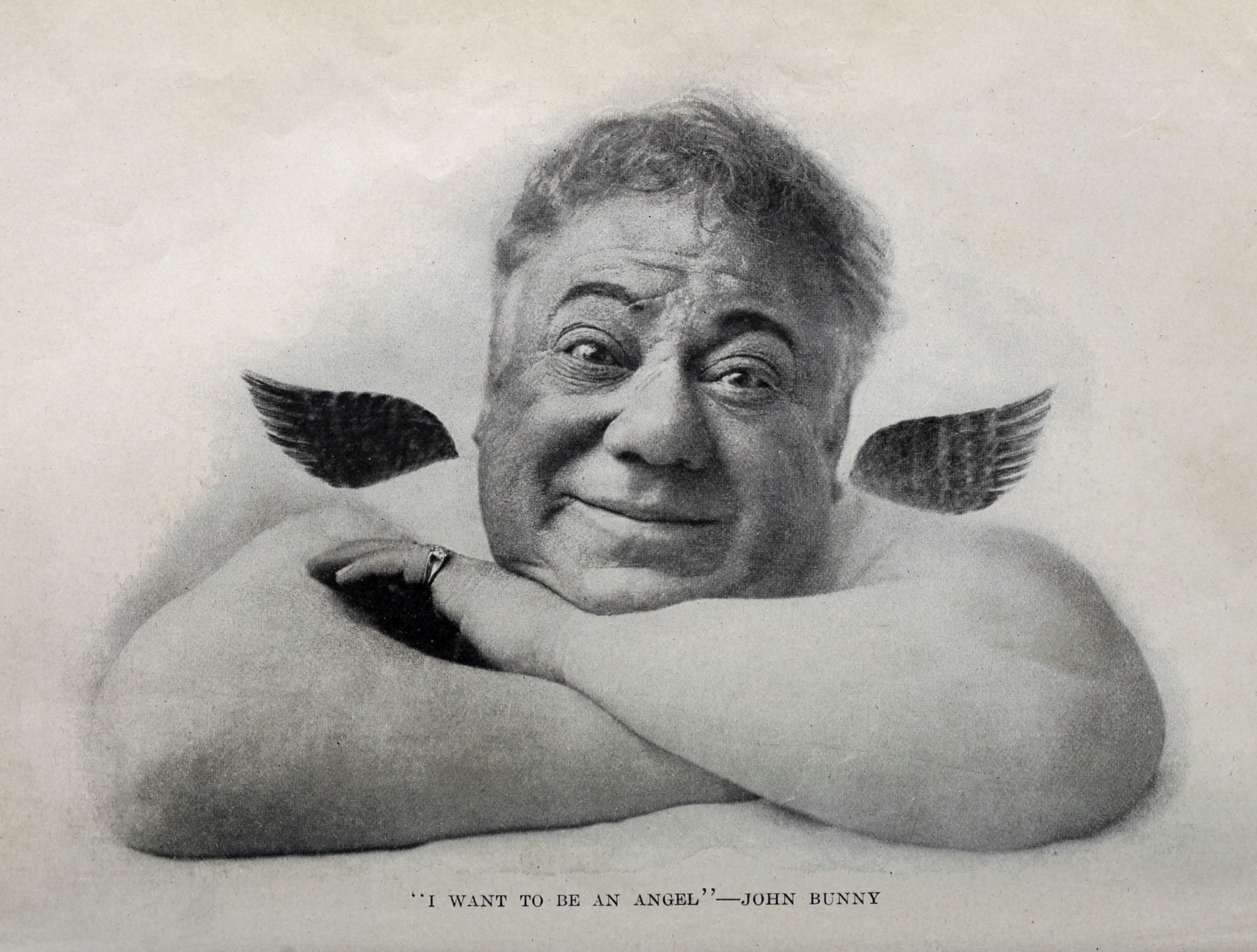
"I want to be an angel": Bunny in 1914, a year before his death

Bunny was one of the most well known film actors of his lifetime. A New York Times editorial published after Bunny's death noted that thousands recognized him as "the living symbol of wholesome merriment", and declared: "Wherever movies are exhibited, and that is everywhere, Bunny had his public. It is perfectly safe to say that no other camera actor was as popular in this country." The actress Frances Agnew wrote in 1913 that "Mr. Bunny's name is a household word, not only from coast to coast in America, but also in every city and town in the world at all acquainted with the 'movies'". An article published in London's Daily News recounted the enthusiastic reception Bunny received while filming The Pickwick Papers in England and how his fame was such that a heavy-set member of King George V's entourage was mistaken for the actor while the King was visiting Scotland.

Bunny's skills as an actor were praised by his contemporaries. In particular, his ability to convey emotion without the use of words drew comment from critics. John Palmer of the Saturday Review declared: "Mr. Bunny has an extensive and extremely flexible face. ... We know at once why Mr. Bunny never speaks. He could not possibly find words to convey the extremity of his feelings." According to The New York World: "The advent of the film drama found [Bunny] particularly well endowed for the new art of acting without words. The range of his facial expression was altogether wonderful, and when the emotion of the moment had told its story in his features there was nothing left for the words to do." The poet and writer Joyce Kilmer wrote glowingly of Bunny's acting ability, and claimed that Bunny was responsible for reviving the art of pantomime.

A 1916 Washington Times article claimed: "To John Bunny ... must be given the credit of presenting the first bits of refined comedy in photoplay. Previous to his advent into screenland film comedies were either "chases" or grotesque trick photography. He rescued screen humor from the chamber of horrors and placed it in the hall of fame". In the words of his contemporary Henry Lanier, Bunny demonstrated "that a real actor can make an incredible success before [a film] audience without any of the vulgarity or horseplay which used to be considered essential". This assessment is echoed by the modern film scholar Wes Gehring, who writes that "Bunny helped elevate at the time what was still often considered a second-class medium to a level of artistic significance".

According to Frank Scheide, Bunny's films might have been taken more seriously because "Bunny's humor was based more on comedy of manners than slapstick", a "polite" and "respectable" form of situational comedy in contrast to the "decidedly lowbrow, crass, and often violent" humor of slapstick films. According to Gehring, Bunny was "the first in a long line of American personality screen comedians", whose approach is marked by a "subordination of story to character". The personality focus of Bunny's films was also noted by the screenwriter Catherine Carr, who wrote in 1914: "In most big companies at the present day there are maintained actors around whose personality comedies are being written; i.e., John Bunny, Flora Finch, etc. These actors take the mere germ of a comedy and develop it through their clever acting into a screen production that brings laughter wherever it is shown." Modern viewers may not find Bunny's films as funny as Carr described, however. The film scholar Anthony Slide, for instance, writes that Bunny's "characterizations contain nothing creative, and he uses no knockabout or slapstick comedy. His comedy is all very middle class and very polite. Often so dull is the storyline that the comedy is difficult to uncover. Time and again one wonders if audiences ever did laugh at his work, and, if so, why?"

Despite his genial on-screen persona, Bunny was disliked by some of his fellow actors at Vitagraph. Bunny and Finch "cordially hated each other" according to Vitagraph's co-founder Albert E. Smith, and interviews of former Vitagraph personnel revealed that some found him to be arrogant and difficult to work with.

In 1918, after Bunny's death, Samuel Goldwyn signed George Bunny, John's brother, for films but the attempt was not successful. New comedians came to the fore in silent film and John Bunny faded into obscurity. However, in 1960 he was inducted into the Hollywood Walk of Fame (though he made most of his movies in the East) for his contributions to the film industry with a motion pictures star located at 1715 Vine Street in Hollywood.

== Selected filmography ==
Year	Film	Role	Notes
1909	Cohen's Dream	Cohen	Alternative title: Cohen's Dream of Coney Island
1909	Cohen at Coney Island	Cohen	
1910	Davy Jones and Captain Bragg	Captain Bragg	
1910	Captain Barnacle's Chaperone	Captain Barnacle	
1911	A Queen for a Day	Bridget McSweeney	
1911	Teaching McFadden to Waltz	McFadden	
1911	Her Crowning Glory	Mortimer	
1911	Little Nemo		Partially animated short created by Winsor McCay
1911	His Sister's Children		
1912	Captain Jenks' Dilemma	Captain Jenks	
1912	Chumps	Mr. Bun Johnny, The Full Grown	
1912	A Cure for Pokeritis	George Brown	
1912	Michael McShane, Matchmaker	Michael McShane	
1913	Seeing Double	Binks	
1913	Flaming Hearts	Jonathan Whippletree	
1913	The Pickwick Papers	Mr Pickwick	
1913	Bunny Dips Into Society	Bunny	
1913	Bunny as a Reporter	Bunny	
1914	Love's Old Dream	Professor Simon Sweet	
1914	Setting the Style	Mr. Finnegan	
1914	Hearts and Diamonds	Widower Tupper	
1915	The Jarrs Visit Arcadia		
