= Helene Costello =

American actress (1906–1957)

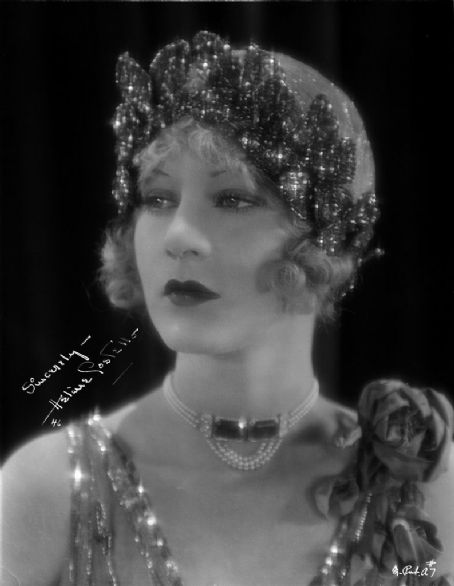
- Costello in the 1920s
- Born: June 21, 1906; New York City, U.S.
- Died: January 26, 1957 (aged 50); San Bernardino, California, U.S.
- Resting place: Calvary Cemetery
- Other names: Helen Costello; Miss Helene
- Occupation: Actress
- Years active: 1909–1942
- Spouses: John W. Regan (m. 1927; div. 1929) Lowell Sherman (m. 1930; div. 1932) Arturo de Barrio (m. 1933; div. 1939) George Lee Le Blanc (m. 1940; div. 1946)
- Children: 1
- Parent(s): Maurice Costello; Mae Costello
- Relatives: Dolores Costello (sister)

Helene Costello (June 21, 1906 – January 26, 1957) was an American stage and film actress, most notably of the silent era.

== Early life and career ==
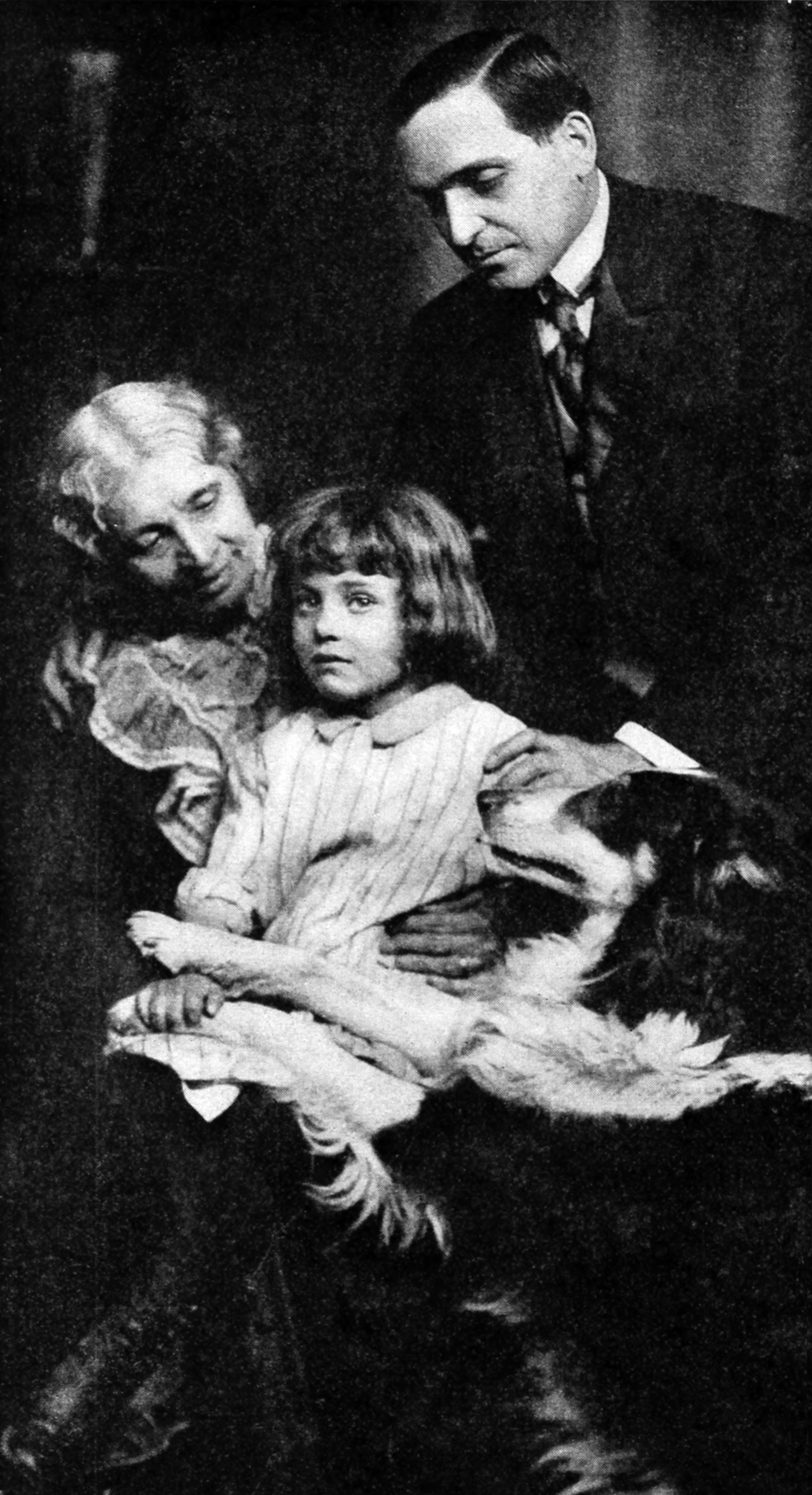
Costello (child) with Mary Maurice, Earle Williams, and the "Vitagraph Dog" Jean in The Church Across the Way, 1912

Born in New York City, Costello was the youngest daughter of the prominent stage and pioneering film actor Maurice Costello and his actress wife Mae Costello (née Altschuk). She had an older sister Dolores, who also became an actress and would go on to marry John Barrymore. Costello first appeared on screen, opposite her father, in the 1909 film adaptation of Victor Hugo's Les Misérables. She would continue acting in films throughout the 1910s as a child actor and also worked in vaudeville and appeared in stage roles. In 1924, she appeared with her sister Dolores in George White's Scandals. Shortly thereafter, both sisters signed contracts with Warner Bros. Costello reached her peak of public popularity in the mid-1920s and earned a reported $3,000 a week.

Although she had been appearing on screen since her early childhood, Costello was selected as a WAMPAS Baby Star in 1927, a promotional campaign sponsored by the Western Association of Motion Picture Advertisers in the United States, which honored thirteen young women each year whom they believed to be on the threshold of movie stardom. In 1928, Costello co-starred in the first all-talking full-length feature film Lights of New York. Later that same year, she was released from her contract with Warner Bros. after she refused to star as a leading lady opposite Rin Tin Tin once again; she had previously appeared alongside the canine star in the 1926 film While London Sleeps. Costello's final substantial role was opposite her sister Dolores in the all-star Technicolor musical revue The Show of Shows (1929). Costello and her sister performed in the "Meet My Sister" musical number.

After the advent of sound, Costello's career declined reportedly because her voice did not record well. She was also beset with personal problems including illnesses, an addiction to drugs and alcohol, three divorces, a public custody battle with her third ex-husband and financial difficulties. From 1930 to 1934, Costello did not appear in a film. In September 1935, she signed a contract with Metro-Goldwyn-Mayer and returned to the screen in a supporting role in Riffraff (1936). Her final role was a bit part in the 1942 film The Black Swan. Later in 1942, Costello filed for bankruptcy.

== Personal life ==
Costello was married four times, each marriage ending in divorce. Her first marriage was to football player John W. Regan in 1927. They divorced in June 1928. Costello's second marriage was to actor/director Lowell Sherman, whom she married on March 15, 1930, in Beverly Hills. They separated in November 1931 and were divorced in May 1932. Costello's third marriage was to Dr. Arturo de Barrio, a lawyer who came from a prominent Cuban family. They were married in Havana on January 6, 1933. Their marriage was considered invalid because Costello's divorce from her second husband was not finalized. They married for a second time in June 1933 in Los Angeles. They were divorced in 1939.

Her fourth and final marriage was to artist George Lee Le Blanc, whom Costello married in 1940. The couple had a daughter, Diedre, on February 18, 1941. Costello filed for divorce on August 6, 1947. Shortly after Costello filed for divorce, Le Blanc joined the Merchant Marine. Before leaving, Le Blanc left Diedre in the care of Costello's sister Dolores claiming that Costello was unfit to care for Diedre because of her alcoholism. Costello denied Le Blanc's claim and attempted to regain sole custody in September 1947. During one custody hearing, Costello's father and Lionel Barrymore (Dolores Costello's ex brother-in-law) testified that Costello did not have a drinking problem. In April 1948, Costello was forced to drop her suit due to financial troubles and Le Blanc was awarded temporary custody of Diedre. Costello and Le Blanc were divorced in June 1948.

== Death ==
On January 24, 1957, Costello was admitted to Patton State Hospital under the assumed name of Adrienne Costello for treatment for a drug and alcohol addiction. She died there two days later of pneumonia. Her sister, Dolores Costello Barrymore, was with her when she died. Her funeral was held on January 30, after which she was interred in an unmarked grave at Calvary Cemetery in East Los Angeles.

== Other ==
For her contribution to the motion film industry, Helene Costello has a star on the Hollywood Walk of Fame at 1500 Vine Street in Hollywood.

Comedian Lou Costello, born Louis Cristillo, changed his name in honor of Helene Costello. Coincidentally, both of them were born in 1906.

== Filmography ==
Short subject
Year	Title	Role	Notes
1909	Les Misérables	Child	Part 1
1909	A Midsummer Night's Dream	Fairy	
1911	Consuming Love; or, St. Valentine's Day in Greenaway Land		
1911	A Quaker Mother	The Harmon Daughter	
1911	Courage of Sorts		
1911	The Geranium		
1911	Captain Barnacle's Baby	The Baby	
1911	Her Crowning Glory	Helen, the Child	
1911	The Child Crusoes		
1911	His Sister's Children	Boker aka Toodle	Credited as Helen Costello
1911	Regeneration	The Ross Child	
1911	Auld Lang Syne	The Child	
1911	A Reformed Santa Claus	The Widow's 2nd Child	
1911	The Old Doll	The Child	
1912	Captain Jenks' Dilemma	One of Widow Brown's Children	
1912	The Meeting of the Ways	One of Tom's Children	
1912	Tom Tilling's Baby	The Carter Baby	
1912	Captain Barnacle's Messmates	A Child	
1912	The First Violin	Helen - A Little Waif	
1912	The Five Senses		
1912	At Scroggineses' Corner	Alice as a Child	Credited as Helen Costello
1912	The Greatest Thing in the World	A Lost Child	
1912	Lulu's Doctor		
1912	The Days of Terror; or, in the Reign of Terror		
1912	The Church Across the Way	Adele - The Child	Credited as Helen Costello
1912	The Troublesome Step-Daughters		
1912	The Money Kings		
1912	The Black Sheep	Clara Moreland as a Child	
1912	Wanted... a Grandmother	Phillip - Hale's Invalid Son	
1912	Rip Van Winkle	Steenie as a Child	
1912	Captain Barnacle's Legacy	The Little African Child	
1912	The Irony of Fate	Third Child	
1912	The Toymaker	Another Child	Unconfirmed
1912	In the Garden Fair	Mrs. Rose's Daughter, Helen	
1912	Six O'Clock	The Child	
1912	The Servant Problem; or, How Mr. Bullington Ran the House	One of the Third Cook's Three Children	
1912	The Night Before Christmas	Helen Corbin - The Child	
1912	Two Women and Two Men	Little Nellie Thornwell	
1912	Days of Terror		
1913	Mr. Bolter's Niece	Pet - Mr. Bolter's Niece	
1913	Buttercups	Second Child	
1913	Just Show People		
1913	Beau Brummel	Child	Uncredited; Lost film
1913	Tim Grogan's Foundling	Pearl Ligard - The Foundling	Credited as Helen Costello
1913	The One Good Turn		
1913	The Mystery of the Stolen Child	The Stolen Grandchild	
1913	The Hindoo Charm	Helen Tilbury - The Younger Child	
1913	Fortune's Turn	The Child	
1913	The Other Woman	John's Child	
1913	Heartbroken Shep	Runa	
1913	The Fruits of Vengeance	Pauline's Child	
1913	Matrimonial Manoeuvres	Little Nellie	
1913	The Doctor's Secret	Elsa, as a child	Lost film
1913	The Price of Thoughtlessness	Mabel	
1913	Fellow Voyagers	Little Helen Gray	
1913	A Christmas Story	Bessie's Child	
1914	Bunny's Mistake	Little Helene	
1914	Some Steamer Scooping	Helen Reigel	
1914	Memories That Haunt	Little Annie	Credited as Helen Costello
1914	Etta of the Footlights		
1914	The Mysterious Lodger	Brent's Child	
1914	The Barrel Organ	The Child	
1914	The Blood Ruby	Hugh's Child	
1914	Too Much Burlgar		
1914	By the Governor's Order	Little Hope	
1915	The Evil Men Do	Beatrice - as a Little Girl	
1915	Lifting the Ban of Coventry	Helen Stuyvesant - their child	
1915	The Heart of Jim Brice		
1916	Billie's Mother	Billie	

Features
Year	Title	Role	Notes
1912	Cleopatra	Nicola - a Child	
1925	Ranger of the Big Pines	Virginia Weatherford	Lost film
1925	The Man on the Box	Bob's Sister	
1925	Bobbed Hair		Uncredited
1926	The Love Toy	Princess Patricia	Lost film
1926	Wet Paint	She	Lost film
1926	Don Juan	Rena - Adriana's Maid	Uncredited
1926	The Honeymoon Express	Margaret Lambert	Lost film
1926	Millionaires	Ida	Lost film
1926	While London Sleeps	Dale Burke	Lost film
1927	Finger Prints	Jacqueline Norton	Lost film
1927	The Fortune Hunter	Josie Lockwood	Lost film
1927	The Broncho Twister	Paulita Brady	Lost film
1927	The Heart of Maryland	Nancy	Incomplete film
1927	Good Time Charley	Rosita Keene - Daughter	
1927	In Old Kentucky	Nancy Holden	Lost film
1927	Husbands for Rent	Molly Devoe	Lost film
1928	Burning Up Broadway	Floss	Lost film
1928	Comrades	Helen Dixon	Lost film
1928	The Phantom of the Turf	Joan	Lost film
1928	Lights of New York	Kitty Lewis	
1928	The Midnight Taxi	Nan Parker	
1928	The Circus Kid	Trixie	
1928	Broken Barriers	Beryl Moore	Lost film
1929	When Dreams Come True	Caroline Swayne	Lost film
1929	The Fatal Warning	Dorothy Rogers	Lost film
1929	Innocents of Paris	Bit Role	Uncredited
1929	The Show of Shows	Performer in "Meet My Sister" Number	
1935	Public Hero ﹟1	Undetermined Role	Uncredited
1935	Honeymoon Limited	Mrs. Randall	
1936	Riffraff	Maizie	
1942	The Black Swan	Woman	Uncredited
