= Flora Finch =

English actress (1867–1940)

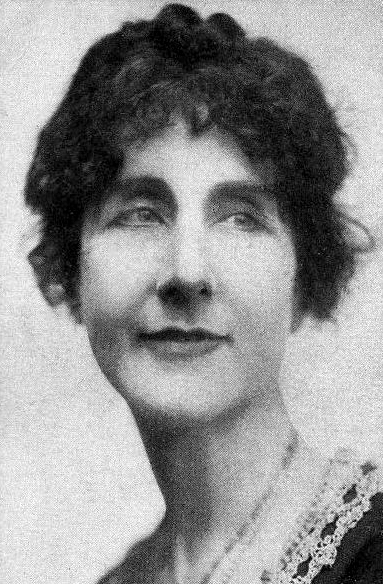
- Portrait on postcard, c. 1916
- Born: 17 June 1867; London, England
- Died: 4 January 1940 (aged 72); Los Angeles, California
- Occupation: Actress
- Years active: 1908–1939
- Spouse: Harold March (?–?)

Flora Finch (17 June 1867 – 4 January 1940) was an English-born vaudevillian, stage and film actress who starred in over 300 silent films, including over 200 for the Vitagraph Studios film company. The vast majority of her films from the silent era are currently classified as lost.

== Early life and career ==
Finch was born into a music hall and travelling theatrical family in London and was taken to the United States as a young child. She kept up the family tradition and worked in theatre and the vaudeville circuit right up until her 30s.

She had her first film roles at the American Mutoscope and Biograph Company starting in 1908. There she worked with Fatty Arbuckle, Mack Sennett (with whom she was reportedly involved romantically for a short time), Charlie Chaplin, and other leading performers and producers of the silent era.

== Work with John Bunny and later career ==
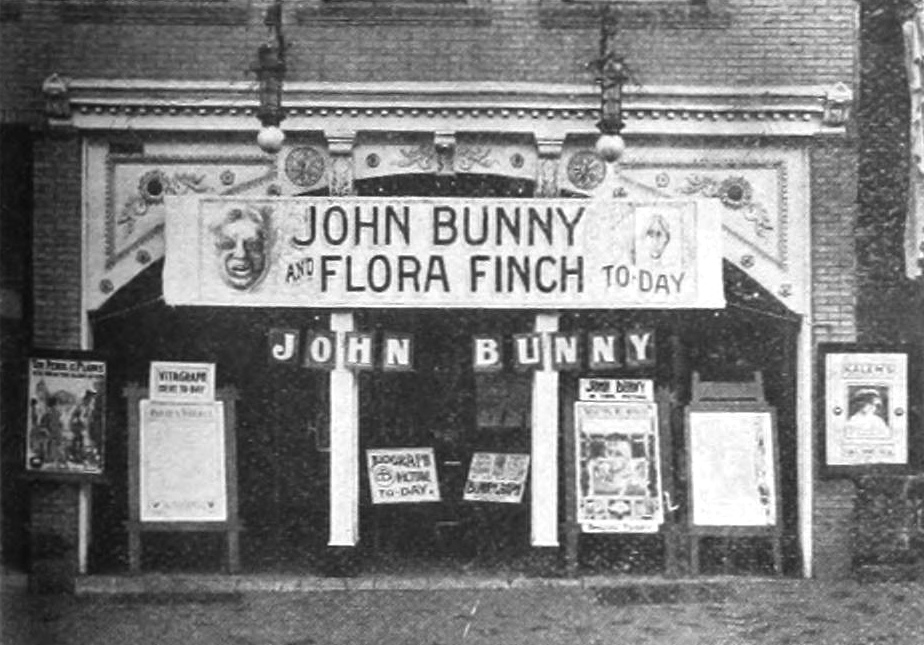
Aurora Theater (Lawrence, Kansas) advertising film with Bunny and Finch, 1912

Starting in 1910 at Vitagraph, she was paired with John Bunny for the first of 160 very popular shorts produced between 1910 and 1915. Those shorts, known as "Bunnygraphs", "Bunnyfinches", and "Bunnyfinchgraphs", established Finch and Bunny as the first popular comedy team in films. The duo became a short-lived trio when Mabel Normand arrived at the studio.

After Bunny's death in 1915, Finch continued to make comedy shorts, but with less success. She started her own production company in 1916, and released a film with the company the following year, but was never able to regain her popularity. One of her best-known roles in the later silent years was Aunt Susan in Paul Leni's The Cat and the Canary (1927).

She found film work in the sound era, although predominantly in small supporting parts. The Scarlet Letter (1934) gave her one of her more substantial roles in sound films, and she had a cameo in one of Laurel and Hardy's best-known features, Way Out West (1937). Her last film was The Women (1939).

== Death ==
Finch died in 1940 at the Good Samaritan Hospital in Los Angeles from blood poisoning. She was taken to the hospital after a streptococcus infection followed an accidental cut to her arm. The infection spread beyond control and the actress lapsed into a coma from bronchial pneumonia. At the time of her death, she was working as a stock player at Metro-Goldwyn-Mayer studios.

== Partial filmography ==
Sourcing: American Film Institute catalogue:

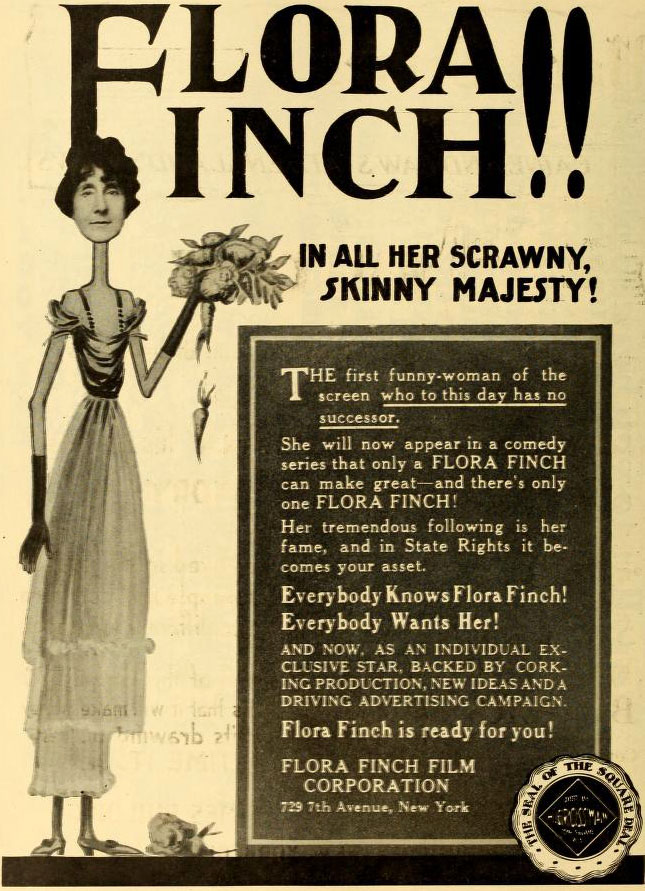
Advertisement, 1917

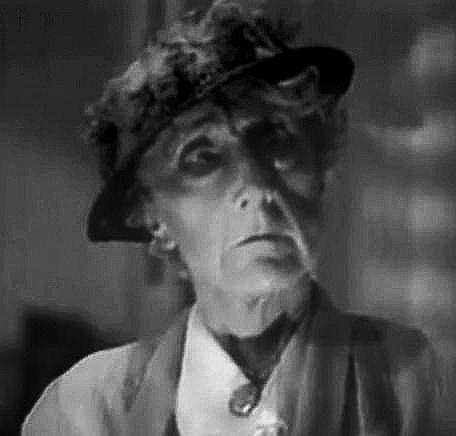
Finch in Postal Inspector (1936)

- The Helping Hand (1908)
- Mrs. Jones Entertains (1909)
- Mr. Jones Has a Card Party (1909)
- Mr. Jones and the Lady Book Agent (1909)
- Those Awful Hats (1909)
- A Wreath in Time (1909)
- A Sound Sleeper (1909)
- His Wife's Mother (1909)
- All on Account of the Milk (1910)
- Her Crowning Glory (1911)
- A Cure for Pokeritis (1912)
- Bunny as a Reporter (1913)
- Hearts and Diamonds (1914)
- Prudence the Pirate (1916)
- The Great Adventure (1918)
- Orphans of the Storm (1921)
- When Knighthood Was in Flower (1922)
- Monsieur Beaucaire (1924)
- Roulette (1924)
- The Midnight Girl (1925)
- Men and Women (1925)
- His Buddy's Wife (1925)
- The Wrongdoers (1925)
- The Adventurous Sex (1925)
- Lover's Island (1925)
- The Early Bird (1925)
- The Live Wire (1925)
- A Kiss for Cinderella (1925)
- Fifth Avenue (1926)
- The Brown Derby (1926)
- Captain Salvation (1927)
- The Cat and the Canary (1927)
- Rose of the Golden West (1927)
- Quality Street (1927)
- Five and Ten Cent Annie (1928)
- The Haunted House (1928)
- The Faker (1929)
- Come Across (1929)
- Sweet Kitty Bellairs (1930)
- I Take This Woman (1931)
- Postal Inspector (1936) (uncredited)
- Way Out West (1937)
- The Women (1939)

== Bibliography ==
- Klepper, Robert K. (2005). Silent films, 1877–1996 : a critical guide to 646 movies. Jefferson, NC: McFarland. ISBN 978-0-7864-2164-0.
