= Billy the Kid (1911 film) =

1911 film

- Directed by: Laurence Trimble
- Written by: Edward J. Montagne
- Produced by: Vitagraph Company of America
- Starring: Tefft Johnson; Edith Storey
- Distributed by: The General Film Company, Incorporated
- Release date: August 9, 1911
- Running time: One reel / 305 metres
- Country: United States
- Languages: Silent; English intertitles

Billy the Kid is a 1911 American silent Western film directed by Laurence Trimble for Vitagraph Studios. It is very loosely based on the life of Billy the Kid. It is believed to be a lost film.

== Plot ==
The following is one of the only reviews of the 1911 short film from The Moving Picture World:

The duties of the sheriff as performed by "Uncle Billy" were not a matter of pleasure. His son-in-law is a member of the posse; lie and "Uncle Billy" leave the house hurriedly to join their comrades in pursuit of the outlaws. Two hours later the son in-law is carried back to his home, the victim of the gang. A little daughter is born to the widow and left an orphan. "Uncle Billy" is anxious that the child should be a boy, but through the secrecy of the Spanish servant. "Uncle Billy" never knew that "Billy, the Kid." was a girl. The sheriff brought her up as a young cowboy, although he noticed there was a certain timidity in the "Kid" that was not at all becoming a boy. When "Billy, the Kid," is sixteen years of age, her grandfather sends her to a town school. Lee Curtis, the foreman of "Uncle Billy's" ranch, was the "Kid's" pal; they were very fond of each other, and it was hard for Lee to part with his young associate, when he accompanied her to the cross roads where they meet the stage. The stage is held up by the outlaws. The "Kid" is taken captive and held as a ransom; they send a note to "Uncle Billy" saying: "If he will grant them immunity, they will restore the 'Kid.'" When the sheriff gets this message, he is furious, and the Spanish servant who well knows that the "Kid" is a girl, is almost frantic with apprehension lest the "Kid's" captors discover this fact. She tells "Uncle Billy" why she has kept him in ignorance of the truth. Lee Curtis overhears the servant's statement, and with the sheriff, rushes out to get the posse in action. "Billy the Kid" has managed to escape from the outlaws and meets the sheriff and his posse. Her grandfather loses no time in getting her back home and into female attire. This time "Uncle Billy" Is going to send the "Kid" to a female seminary and he is going to take her there himself. She tells her grandfather she just wants to be "Billy the Kid" and have Lee for her life companion. "Uncle Billy" has nothing more to say, and it is not long before she changes her name to Mrs. Lee Curtis.

== Cast ==
- Tefft Johnson as Lee Curtis
- Edith Storey as Billy the Kid
- Ralph Ince as Billy's Uncle
- Julia Swayne Gordon as Billy's Mother
- William R. Dunn
- Harry T. Morey

== Production ==
- Directed by Laurence Trimble, this film was shot in a standard 35mm spherical 1.33:1 format.
- Edith Storey, who had played male characters prior in such films as Oliver Twist and A Florida Enchantment, portrays the "first 'cowgirl' film star" as Billy the Kid.

== Preservation status ==
This is presumed a lost film.

== See also ==
- List of American films of 1911
- List of lost silent films (1910–14)
