= Le Ruisseau =

Le Ruisseau may refer to:

- Le Ruisseau, a 1907 play by Pierre Wolff which was the basis for several films:
  - French title of The Virtuous Model (1919), American film directed by Albert Capellani
  - Le Ruisseau (1929 film), French film play directed by René Hervil starring René Lefèvre
  - Le Ruisseau (1938 film), French film directed by Maurice Lehmann and Claude Autant-Lara
