= Moon Madness =

Moon Madness may refer to:

- Moon Madness (horse), a British Thoroughbred racehorse and sire
- The Secret of the Selenites, known as Moon Madness in the United States, a 1984 French animated comedy film
- Moon Madness (1920 film), an American silent drama film

== See also ==
- Moonmadness, a 1976 album by Camel
