= Everybody's Girl (film) =

1918 film directed by Tom Terriss

- Directed by: Tom Terriss
- Written by: A. Van Buren Powell
- Based on: the short story, Brick Dust Row by O. Henry
- Produced by: Albert E. Smith
- Starring: Alice Joyce; May Hopkins; Walter McGrail
- Cinematography: Robert A. Stuart
- Production company: Vitagraph
- Distributed by: Greater Vitagraph, Inc.
- Release date: October 18, 1918 (US)
- Running time: 5 reels
- Country: United States
- Language: Silent (English intertitles)

Everybody's Girl is a 1918 American silent comedy drama film directed by Tom Terriss and written by Van Powell. The film stars Alice Joyce, May Hopkins, and Walter McGrail.

== Cast list ==
- Alice Joyce as Florence
- May Hopkins as Ella
- Walter McGrail as Blinker
- Percy Standing as Bill
- William T. Carleton as Oldport (*as W. T. Carleton)
- Victor Stewart as Blinker's servant
- Bernard Siegel as Millinery shop proprietor

== Plot ==
Florence and her roommate, Ella, work trimming hats, and live in a flat on Brick Dust Row. Because of his stinginess, their rich landlord has taken away the girls' parlor in order to rent it out to a business. Due to this fact, the two women could not entertain young men in their apartment, so they would meet them in the park. During one of their outings, they go on the Staten Island Ferry, where they meet Blinker, a rich man who has taken the ferry to get away from his regular group of friends. Florence and Blinker hit it off, and she agrees to meet him again.

One night, a local tough, Bill gets into a fight where he uses his gun to get out of it. Fleeing from the police, he ends up in Florence and Ella's room, although Ella is out. At first, Florence is quite scared, but Bill calms her and eventually earns her trust. When the police do get around to searching Florence's building, she tells them that Bill is her brother and he has been with her all evening, earning his gratitude. Bill becomes the girls' protector, looking after them to make sure nothing bad happens to them. Additionally, he begins to have an emotional relationship with Ella.

When Florence goes to meet Blinker again on the ferry, Bill is following, to keep watch over her. While on the ferry, Blinker presses Florence to know more about her past. She admits to meeting men in the park, which shocks Blinker's sensibilities. He is about to let her down easy, when the boat catches fire. Florence jumps overboard, and Blinker dives in after her to save her. They are both in danger of drowning when Bill arrives and saves the both of them. When they get to shore, Blinker leaves, and Florence is distraught, feeling that she has lost the only man she has ever loved. Bill goes to Blinker, and explains what a true and honest woman she is. He convinces Blinker, who reunites with Florence.

== Production ==
Some of the exteriors for the film were shot along the coast of Maine. The interiors of the film were shot at the Brooklyn studios of Vitagraph.

== Reception ==
The Eugene Guard gave the film a positive review, calling the movie one of Alice Joyce's "most delightful pictures", with "beautiful exteriors". The York Daily Record also enjoyed the film, stating, "A delightful love story, with just enough action, and an ending that will please everyone." They also felt it was one of the best films of Joyce's career. "A story of the tenements that hasn't an unpleasant moment", was how the South Bend Tribune characterized the film, saying that it is "a story that will appeal to the working girl as well as anyone interested in certain aspects of city life." The Nashville Banner stated, that in the film "Alice Joyce in one of the most delightful love stories in her screen career. She never looked more beautiful or acted with greater naturalness and appeal than as Florence, the little hat trimmer, who is Everybody's Girl." They felt the screen adaption of O. Henry's story lost none of the charm of the original short story. Wid's Daily also gave the film a good review, "This surely registers as decidely pleasing entertainment that should go over with a bang anywhere. They have taken several well-known situations in this and built them into a human, delightful romantic offering that makes you feel good all over." They commended the direction of Terris, saying that he "made characters seem real and got the most out of every situation with many excellent touches registered." They also complimented the story and acting, particularly that of the supporting cast, whom they called, "excellent".
