= The Girl from Chicago (1927 film) =

1927 film by Ray Enright

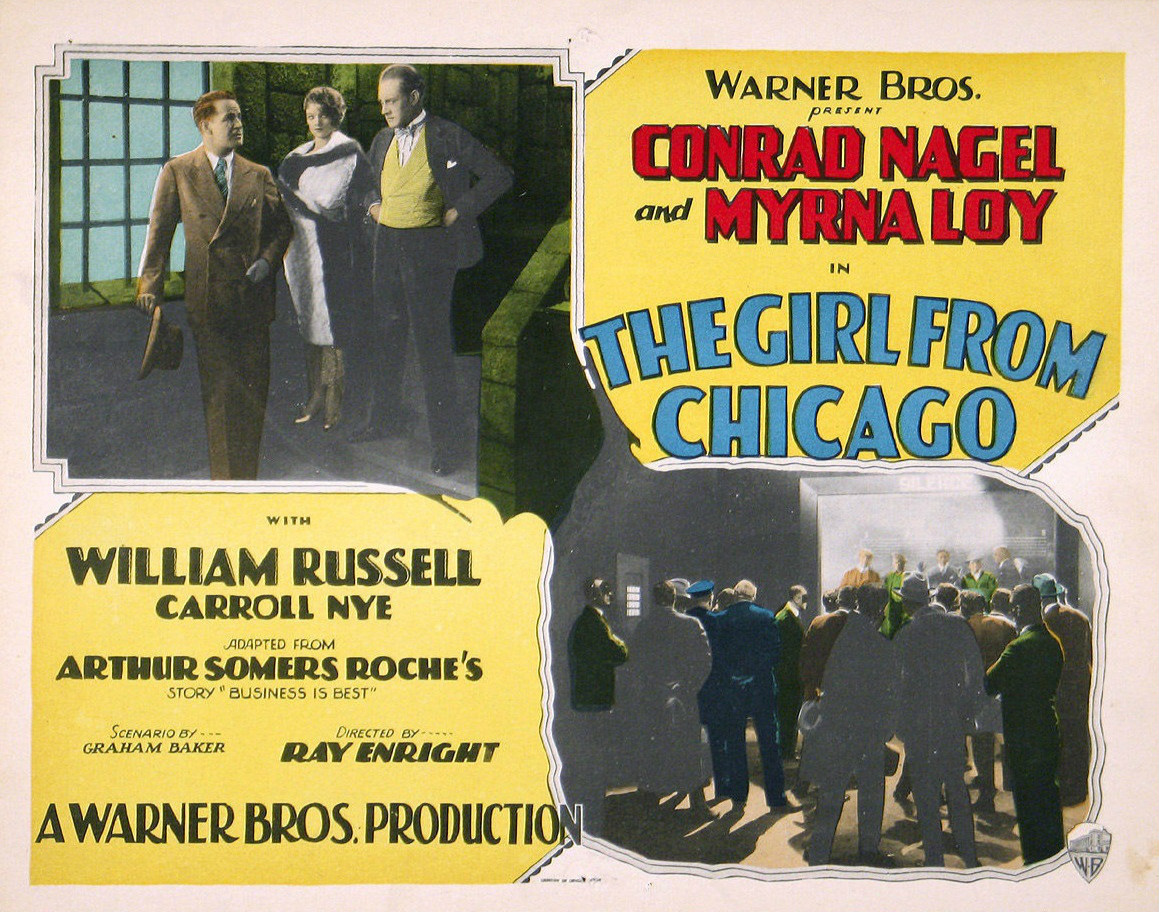
- Lobby card
- Directed by: Ray Enright; Frank Shaw (assistant)
- Written by: Graham Baker (scenario)
- Based on: "Button, Button" by Arthur Somers Roche
- Starring: Myrna Loy; Conrad Nagel
- Cinematography: Hal Mohr
- Production company: Warner Bros.
- Distributed by: Warner Bros.
- Release date: October 19, 1927
- Running time: 70 minutes
- Country: United States
- Languages: Sound (Synchronized) (English Intertitles)

The Girl from Chicago is a lost 1927 American synchronized sound criminal romantic drama film directed by Ray Enright and starring Myrna Loy and Conrad Nagel. While the film has no audible dialog, it was released with a synchronized musical score with sound effects using the Vitaphone sound-on-disc process. The film was produced and distributed by the Warner Bros. and is based upon a short story by Arthur Somers Roche that appeared in the June 1923 Redbook.

The film is one of the earliest starring roles for Loy who at this time, 1927, did not usually star but was a supporting player. Warner Bros. took a chance casting her in a principal part. The studio later made an all-talkie with a suspiciously similar plot in 1930 as Those Who Dance which itself was a remake of the 1924 silent film Those Who Dance.

== Plot ==
Mary Carlton, daughter of a proud but ailing Southern cotton planter, lives a quiet life on their plantation—until a desperate letter arrives from her brother Bob, now in New York. Bob has been convicted of murder and faces execution. Though he pleads his innocence, the circumstantial evidence is damning. He begs Mary not to tell their father.

Determined to clear his name, Mary travels to New York under the pretense of joining Bob in business. There, she learns that his troubles stem from an association with the underworld—and that the key figure may be the elusive gangster “Handsome Joe”. To get close to Joe, Mary poses as a Chicago moll and befriends Big Steve Drummond, Joe's brutish associate.

Playing the part of a flirt, Mary endears herself to Steve, hoping to gather information. At a wild party in a notorious cabaret, Steve insists on escorting her home—but Joe intervenes, rescuing her from the aggressive drunk. Though drawn to Joe's charm, Mary steels herself: he may be the man who framed her brother.

But Joe has a secret of his own. He is Captain Bill Saunders of the police, working undercover to solve the Carlton case. He suspects Mary is somehow involved and begins to investigate her background, unaware she is Bob's sister.

Exhausted and discouraged, Mary returns to her apartment and falls asleep on the eve of her brother's execution. Joe arrives looking for Drummond, and while searching Mary's room he finds a photo portfolio and Bob's letter—realizing at last that Mary is not a gangster's moll, but the condemned man's sister. Before he can act, Steve barges in.

Steve confronts Mary, accusing her of betrayal. As he grows more threatening, Mary senses he may be the real killer. Other gang members, including the jittery Dopey, burst in, revealing that “Handsome Joe” is actually a cop—and he's been working the Carlton case. Steve, confident no weapon was ever recovered, boasts: “They’ll never prove I did the killing.”

Joe, concealed in a closet, hears the confession. But when Steve discovers Mary's photo portfolio, panic erupts. Joe steps out, gun drawn, and covers the gang, but they begin to close in. Mary manages to call police headquarters. Joe shoots out the lights and a firefight erupts in the dark.

At the last moment, the gangster squad arrives. Drummond and his gang are arrested, and Captain Saunders immediately calls the governor to halt Bob's execution.

With Bob exonerated, the siblings and Joe return South. Their ailing father never learns how close his son came to tragedy. And “the lady-killer” Handsome Joe and the girl from Chicago begin a new chapter—one of love and redemption.

== Cast ==
- Conrad Nagel as Handsome Joe
- Myrna Loy as Mary Carlton
- William Russell as Big Steve Drummond
- Carroll Nye as Bob Carlton
- Paul Panzer as Dopey
- Erville Alderson as Colonel Carlton

== See also ==
- List of early sound feature films (1926–1929)
