= Edith Storey =

American actress (1892-1967)

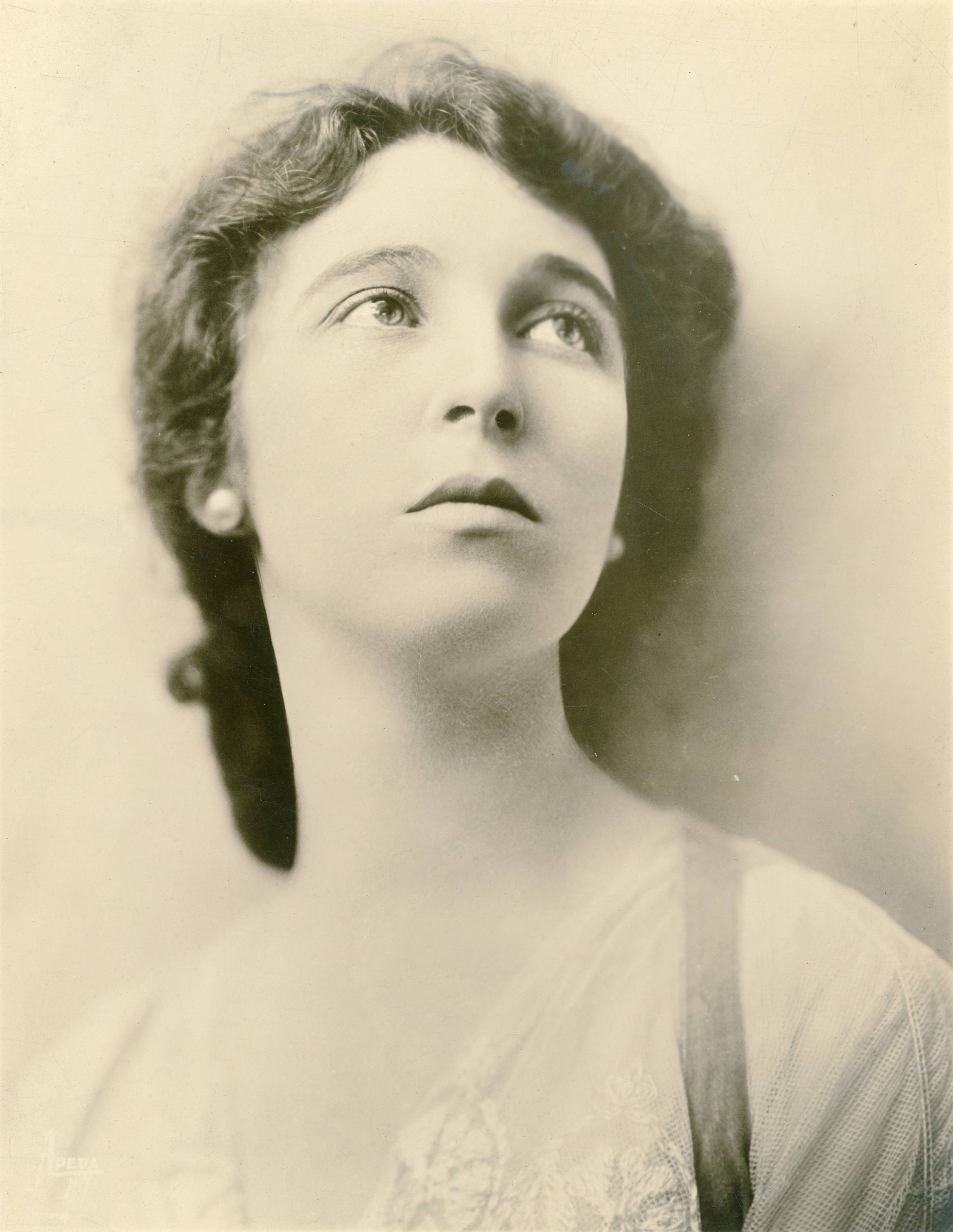
- Storey in 1916
- Born: March 18, 1892; New York City, U.S.
- Died: October 9, 1967 (aged 75); Northport, New York, U.S.
- Occupation: Actress
- Years active: 1908–1921

Edith Storey (March 18, 1892 – October 9, 1967) was an American actress during the silent film era.

== Early life ==
Storey was born on March 18, 1892, in New York City to William Chase Storey and Minnie Storey (née Thorn). Her younger brother, Richard, also had a brief but celebrated acting career. (Note: In addition to being "placed at the head of the list of child actors" by reviewer/aviator/soon-to-be screenwriter Harriet Quimby in the November 15, 1906, issue of Leslie's Weekly, the then recently turned 10-year-old "Dick Storey" was also deemed "one of the cleverest of boy actors on the stage" and "one of the very few children capable of playing character roles.")

Storey began acting when she was a child. Her film career began with the film Francesca di Rimini (1908), also called The Two Brothers. She would have two film roles in 1908, and a total of seventy-five by 1913. Many of these films were Westerns, as Storey was reportedly an excellent horseback rider and could perform her own stunts. Nicknamed Billy at the Star Film Ranch in Texas, she earned the good will of the seasoned cowboys in the Méliès film company for her ability to "ride anything with hair on it".

== Career ==
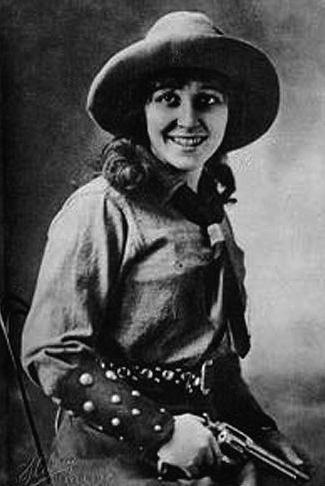
Storey in a still for When the Tables Turned, 1911

Storey (right) in Bobby and His Pal (1911), shot in San Antonio, Texas, and rediscovered in New Zealand in 2010. It is one of only five surviving films from the Star Film Ranch.

Storey worked for New York-based Vitagraph Studios for most of her career except from 1910 to 1911, when she was under contract with Star Film Company in San Antonio, Texas. She appeared in nearly 150 films between 1908 and 1921, including The Immortal Alamo (1911), A Florida Enchantment (1914), and The Christian (1914), the latter film based on the Hall Caine novel of the same name, first made in 1911 and later remade in 1915 and 1923. In 1918, Storey signed with Metro; The Eyes of Mystery (1918) was her debut film for that studio.

She also continued to act on stage, appearing at least once alongside her younger brother in a 1916 revival of Anne Crawford Flexner's adaptation of Mrs. Wiggs of the Cabbage Patch.

Storey was noted for taking on male impersonation roles, such as Lillian/Lawrence in A Florida Enchantment (1914), and was compared to Vesta Tilley. She also referred to herself as 'Billy'.

== Later life ==
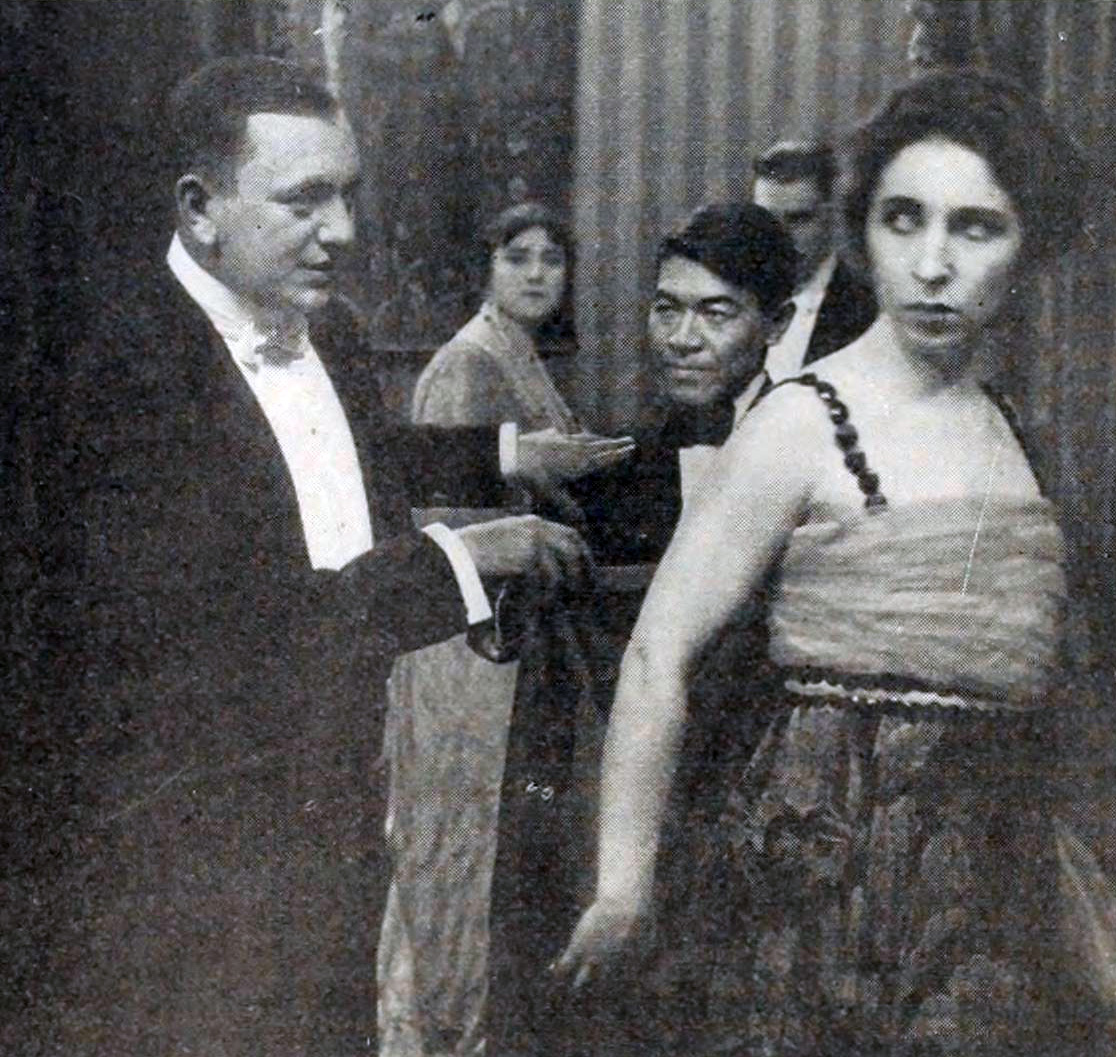
The Shop Girl, 1916

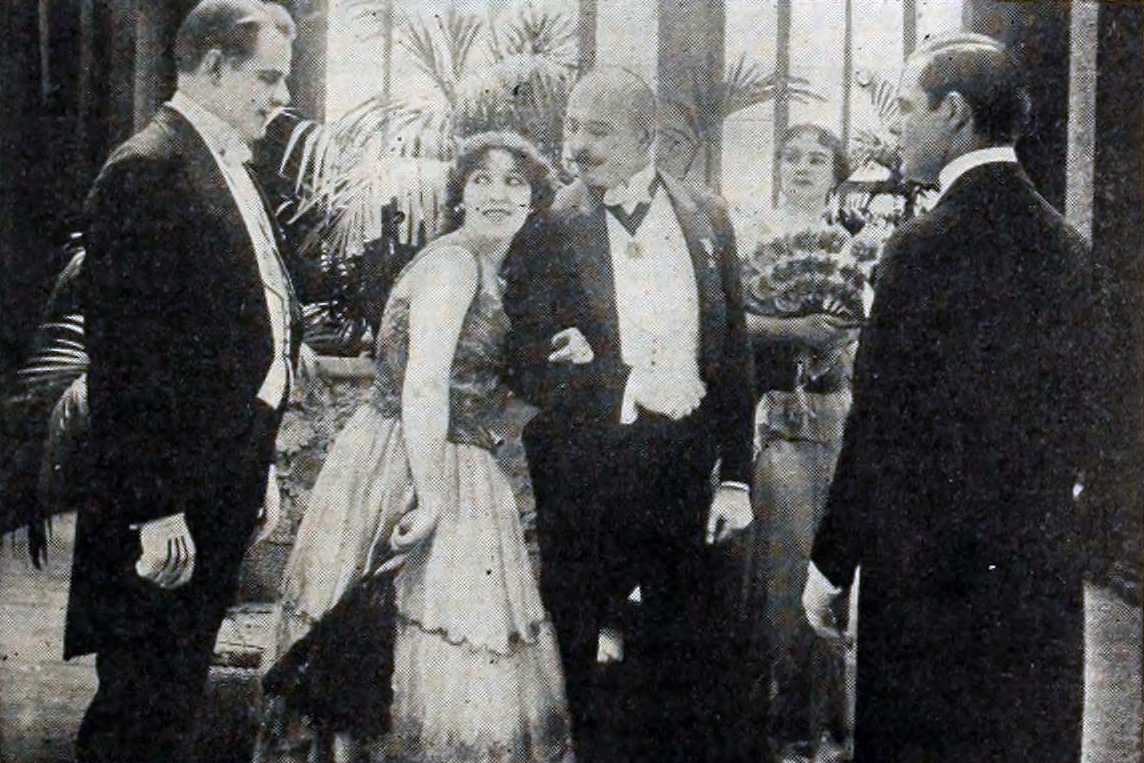
The Tarantula, 1916

She would appear in another seventy-one films from 1913 to 1921, almost all of which were what are considered film shorts. In 1921, aged 29, she retired. She has a star on the Hollywood Walk of Fame for her work in the film industry at 1523 Vine Street.

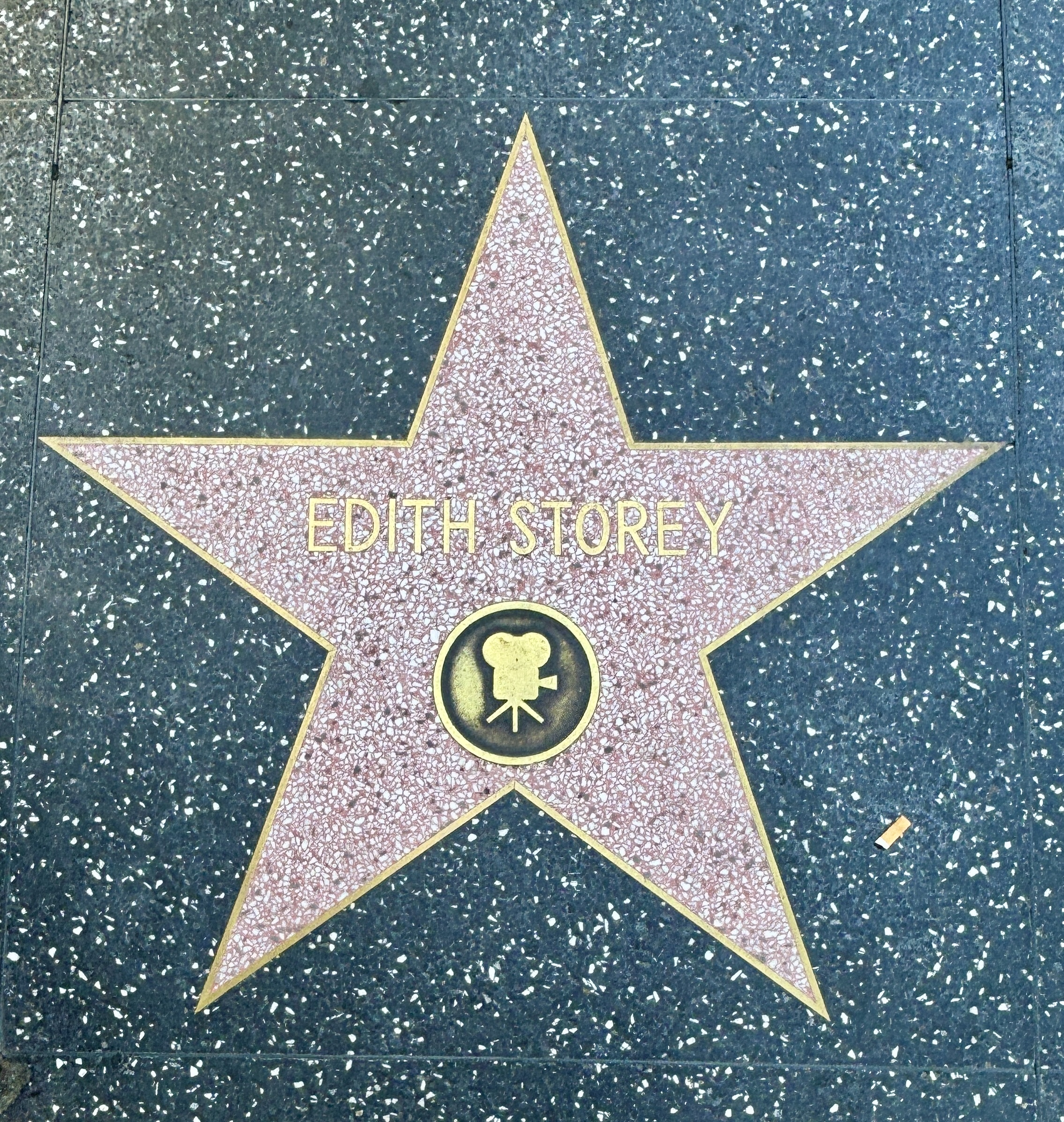
Star on the Hollywood Walk of Fame

Following her retirement from acting, Storey served as village clerk of Asharoken, Long Island for almost 30 years.

She was residing in neighboring Northport at the time of her death on October 9, 1967, aged 75. She was cremated at Fresh Pond Crematory D.B.A. U.S. Columbarium co. on October 13, 1967.

== Selected filmography ==
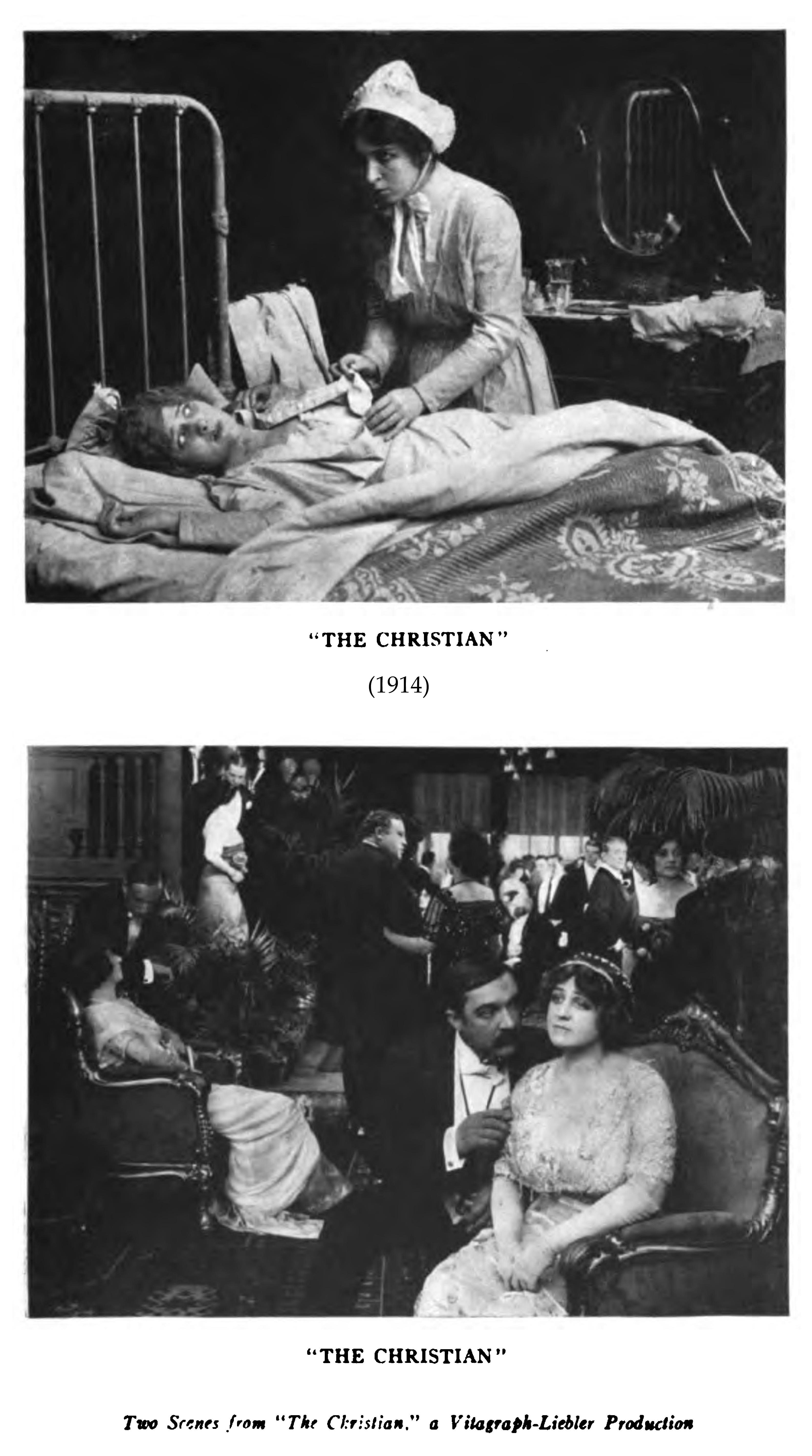
Storey (above two images) in The Christian, 1914

- Oliver Twist (1909)
- The Life of Moses (1909)
- The Immortal Alamo (1911)
- A Tale of Two Cities (1911)
- The Military Air-Scout (1911)
- An Aeroplane Elopement (1911)
- Billy and His Pal (AKA: Bobby and His Pal) (1911)
- Billy the Kid (1911)
- The Child Crusoes (1911)
- Never Again (1912)
- Red and White Roses (1913)
- Hearts of the First Empire (1913)
- The Forgotten Latchkey (1913)
- The Christian (1914)
- A Florida Enchantment (1914)
- Captain Alvarez (1914)
- The Island of Regeneration (1915)
- The Tarantula (1916)
- The Two Edged Sword (1916)
- Money Magic (1917)
- Aladdin from Broadway (1917)
- Captain of the Gray Horse Troop (1917)
- Revenge (1918)
- The Eyes of Mystery (1918)
- The Legion of Death (1918)
- The Claim (1918)
- Treasure of the Sea (1918)
- The Demon (1918)
- The Silent Woman (1918)
- As the Sun Went Down (1919)
- Moon Madness (1920)
- Beach of Dreams (1921)
- The Greater Profit (1921)
