= Man, Woman and Wife =

1929 film

- Directed by: Edward Laemmle
- Written by: Walter Anthony; Charles Logue; Arthur Somers Roche (short story)
- Produced by: Carl Laemmle
- Starring: Norman Kerry; Pauline Starke; Marian Nixon
- Cinematography: Ben F. Reynolds
- Edited by: Daniel Mandell
- Music by: Joseph Cherniavsky
- Production company: Universal Pictures
- Distributed by: Universal Pictures
- Release date: January 13, 1929
- Running time: 70 minutes
- Country: United States
- Languages: Sound (Synchronized); English Intertitles

Man, Woman and Wife is a 1929 American sound drama film directed by Edward Laemmle and starring Norman Kerry, Pauline Starke and Marian Nixon. While the film has no audible dialog, it was released with a synchronized musical score with sound effects using both the sound-on-disc and sound-on-film process. It was based on a short story called Fallen Angels, and the film was also sometimes known by this title.

== Cast ==
- Norman Kerry as Rance Rogers / Ralph Brandon
- Pauline Starke as Julia / Rita
- Marian Nixon as Bella Rogers / Helen Brandon
- Byron Douglas as Senator Blake / Senator Blake
- Kenneth Harlan as Bill / Jack Mason
- Crauford Kent as Wade / Ward Rogers

== Music ==
The film featured a theme song entitled "Love Can Never Die" which was composed by Joseph Cherniovsky and Herman Ruby.

== See also ==
- List of early sound feature films (1926–1929)

== Bibliography ==
- Munden, Kenneth White. The American Film Institute Catalog of Motion Pictures Produced in the United States, Part 1. University of California Press, 1997.
