= Aladdin from Broadway =

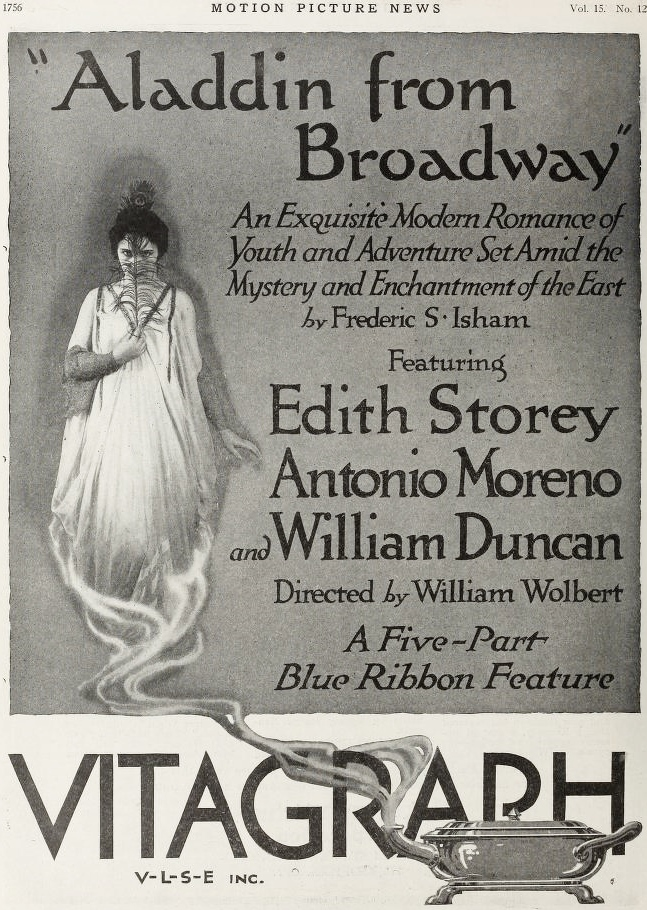
- Directed by: William Wolbert
- Written by: Helmer Walton Bergman; Frederic S. Isham (novel)
- Starring: Edith Storey; Antonio Moreno; Otto Lederer
- Cinematography: Reginald Lyons
- Production company: Vitagraph Company of America
- Distributed by: Vitagraph Company of America
- Release date: March 19, 1917
- Running time: 50 minutes
- Country: United States
- Languages: Silent; English intertitles

Aladdin from Broadway is a lost 1917 American silent adventure film directed by William Wolbert and starring Edith Storey, Antonio Moreno and Otto Lederer.

== Cast ==
- Edith Storey as Faimeh
- Antonio Moreno as Jack Stanton
- William Duncan as William Fitzgerald
- Otto Lederer as Amad
- Laura Winston as Light-of-Life
- George Holt as Sadi

== Preservation ==
With no holdings located in archives, Aladdin From Broadway is considered a lost film.

== Bibliography ==
- Robert B. Connelly. The Silents: Silent Feature Films, 1910-36, Volume 40, Issue 2. December Press, 1998.
