= Antonio Moreno =

Spanish-American actor (1887–1967)

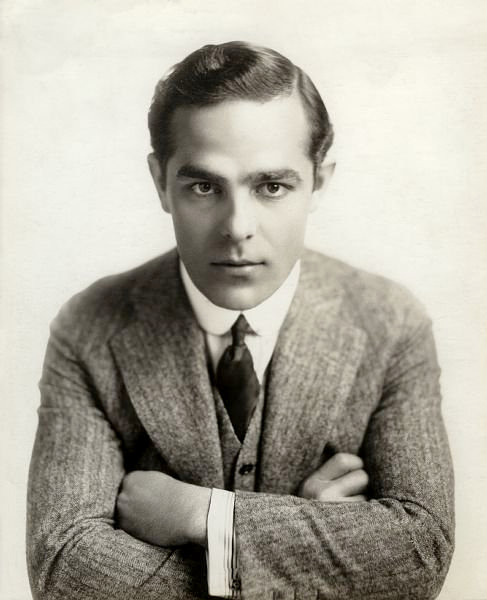
- Moreno in 1916
- Born: Antonio Garrido Monteagudo; September 26, 1887; Madrid, Spain
- Died: February 15, 1967 (aged 79); Beverly Hills, California, U.S.
- Resting place: Forest Lawn Memorial Park, Glendale, California, U.S.
- Other name: Tony Moreno
- Occupations: Actor; director
- Years active: 1912–1959
- Spouse: Daisy Canfield Moreno (m. 1923; died 1933)

Antonio Garrido Monteagudo (September 26, 1887 – February 15, 1967), better known as Antonio Moreno or Tony Moreno, was a Spanish-born American actor and film director of the silent film era and through the 1950s.

== Early life ==
Moreno was born in Madrid, Spain, and emigrated to New York at the age of 14 in 1901. He settled in Massachusetts, where he completed his education. Although he claimed to have attended Williston Seminary in Easthampton, Massachusetts, the archives of the school (now the Williston Northampton School) have no record of his having done so.

== Silent films ==
Moreno became a stage actor in regional theater productions. In 1912, he moved to Hollywood, Los Angeles, where he was signed to Biograph Studios, and began his career in bit parts. His film debut was in Iola's Promise (1912).

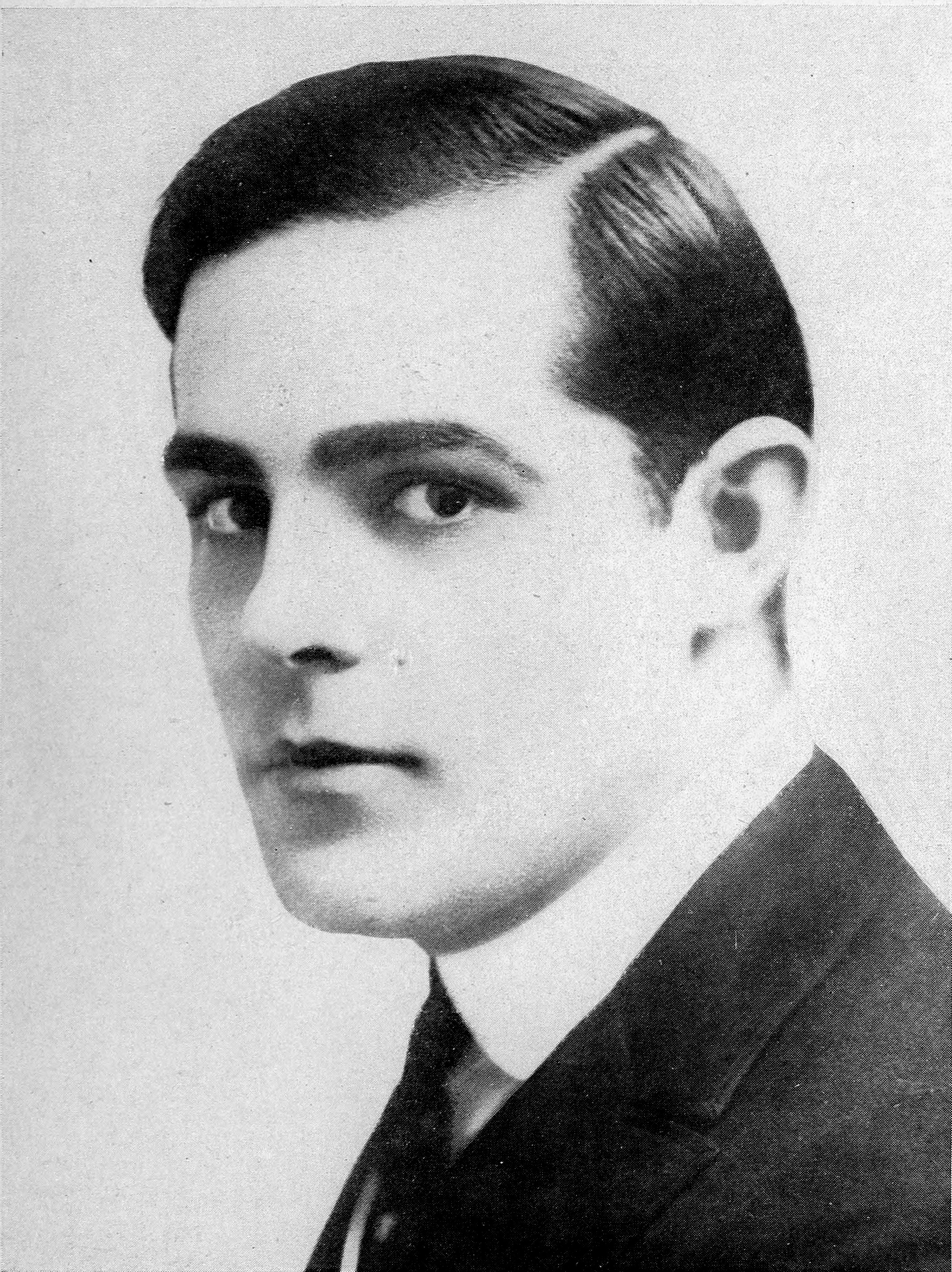
Moreno, 1916

In 1914, Moreno began co-starring in a series of highly successful serials at Vitagraph opposite popular silent film actress Norma Talmadge. These appearances increased Moreno's popularity with nascent filmgoers, and by 1915, he was a highly regarded matinee idol, appearing with successful actors such as Tyrone Power, Sr., Gloria Swanson, Blanche Sweet, Pola Negri, and Dorothy Gish. Moreno often was typecast in his early films as the "Latin Lover". These roles predate Rudolph Valentino's breakthrough as a "Latin Lover" in the 1921 film The Four Horsemen of the Apocalypse.

By the early 1920s, Moreno joined film mogul Jesse Lasky's Famous Players and became one of the company's highly paid performers. In 1926, Moreno starred opposite Swedish acting legend Greta Garbo in The Temptress, and the following year, he had a starring role in the enormous box-office hit It with Clara Bow.

== Sound films ==
With the advent of sound films in the late 1920s and early 1930s, Moreno's career began to falter, in part because of his heavy Spanish accent. While still acting in English language films, Moreno began taking parts in Mexican films. During the early 1930s, Moreno directed several well-received Mexican films, including the 1932 drama Santa, which has been hailed by film critics as one of the best Mexican films of the era.

By the mid-1930s, he began rebuilding his faltering Hollywood career by taking notable roles as a character actor. By the mid-1940s and throughout the 1950s, Moreno appeared in a number of well-received roles, most notably, his 1954 role in the classic horror film Creature from the Black Lagoon and his 1955 role as Emilio Figueroa in film director John Ford's epic The Searchers.

== Personal life ==
On January 27, 1923, Moreno married American heiress Daisy Emma Canfield in Los Angeles, California. They moved to an estate known as Crestmount. The union lasted 10 years and ended shortly before she was killed in an automobile accident on February 23, 1933.

== Death ==
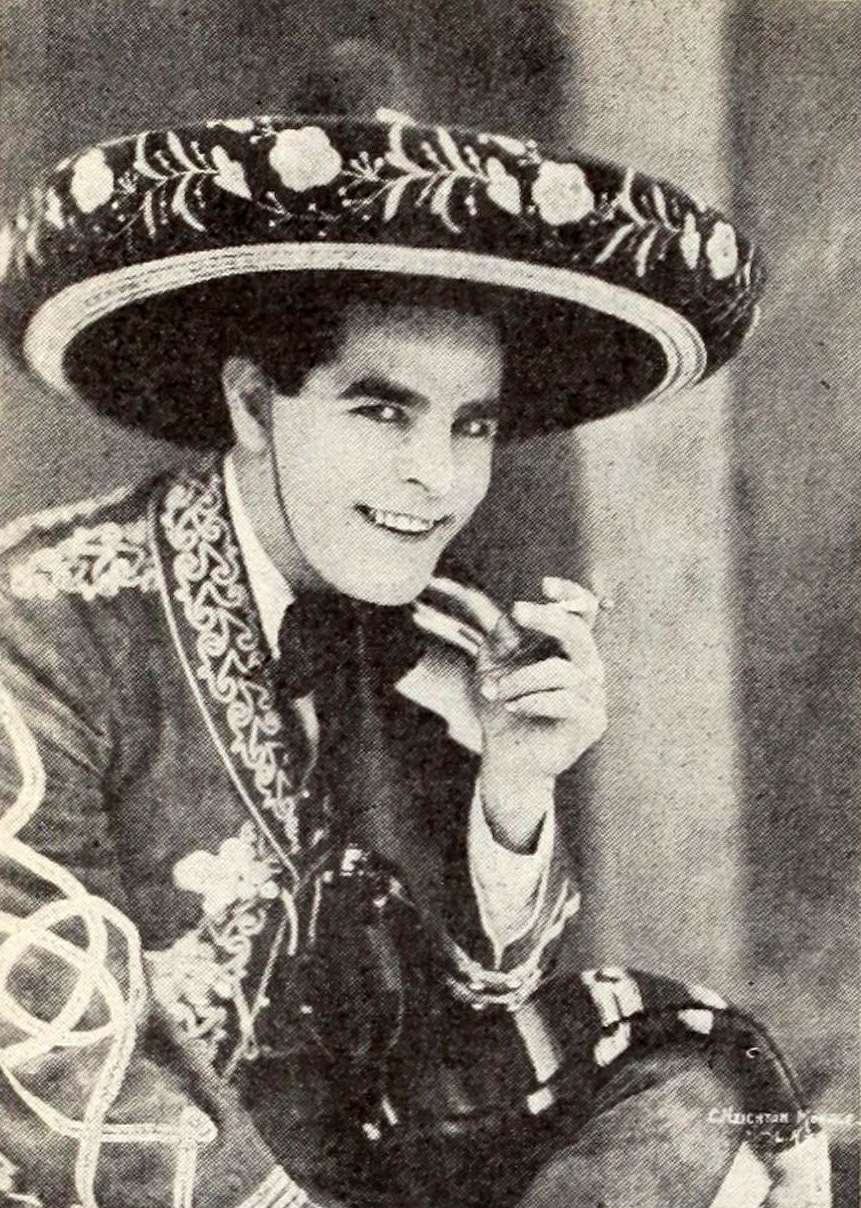
Antonio Moreno (1921)

Moreno died at his home in Beverly Hills, California, on February 15, 1967, aged 79. He was buried at Forest Lawn Memorial Park cemetery in Glendale, California.

== Legacy ==
Moreno's film career spanned more than four decades. In 1994, the Mexican magazine Somos published its list of "The 100 best movies of the cinema of Mexico" in its 100th edition and named the 1931 Moreno directed Santa its 67th choice.

For his contribution to the motion picture industry, Antonio Moreno was given a star on the Hollywood Walk of Fame at 6651 Hollywood Blvd., Hollywood, California.

== Selected filmography ==
- Iola's Promise (1912, Short) as An Indian (uncredited)
- The Voice of the Millions (1912, Short) as One of the Strike Leaders
- His Own Fault (1912) as In Gambling Hall
- An Unseen Enemy (1912, Short) as On Bridge (uncredited)
- Two Daughters of Eve (1912, Short) as An Actor / At Stage Door
- So Near, Yet So Far (1912, Short) as In Club
- The Musketeers of Pig Alley (1912, Short) as Musketeers Gang Member / At Dance (uncredited)
- Oil and Water (1913, Short) as Actor in Play (uncredited)
- A Misunderstood Boy (1913, Short) as Vigilante (uncredited)
- No Place for Father (1913, Short) as The Son
- A Cure for Suffragettes (1913, Short)
- By Man's Law (1913, Short) as Procurer / Slaver
- The House of Discord (1913, Short) as The Sister-in-Law's Sweetheart
- Judith of Bethulia (1914) as Extra
- Strongheart (1914, Short) as Frank Nelson
- Too Many Husbands (1914, Short) as Harry Brown
- The Accomplished Mrs. Thompson (1914, Short) as Dick Osborne
- The Ladies' War (1914) as Mr. Blenkinsop
- The Persistent Mr. Prince (1914, Short) as Prunella's Brother
- Fogg's Millions (1914, Short)
- The Song of the Ghetto (1914, Short) as Mario Amato - the Composer
- John Rance, Gentleman (1914, Short) as Dr. John Rance
- Men and Women (1914, Short) as Man in Kirke's Office (uncredited)
- Memories in Men's Souls (1914, Short) as Graham's Son
- The Hidden Letters (1914, Short) as John Reynolds
- Politics and the Press (1914, Short) as John Marsden - the Newspaper Editor
- The Loan Shark King (1914, Short) as Harry Graham
- The Peacemaker (1914, Short) as Jack Strong
- Under False Colors (1914, Short) as Pvt. Jack Warring
- Goodbye Summer (1914, Short) as Hugo St. Clair - the Artist
- The Old Flute Player (1914, Short) as John Vanderlyn
- Sunshine and Shadows (1914, Short)
- His Father's House (1914)
- In the Latin Quarter (1915, Short) as Andrew Lenique
- The Island of Regeneration (1915) as John Charnock Jr
- The Quality of Mercy (1915, Short) as Bratton Powers - Van Cortland's Personal Secretary
- The Park Honeymooners (1915, Short) as Billy - the Young Husband
- Love's Way (1915, Short) as Rand Cornwall
- The Dust of Egypt (1915) as Geoffrey Lascelles
- Youth (1915, Short) as Harold Harcourt - Sculptor
- Anselo Lee (1915) as Anselo Lee
- The Gypsy Trail (1915, Short) as Willie Buckland - a Gypsy
- A 'Model' Wife (1915, Short) as Robert Blake
- A Price for Folly (1915) as M. Jean de Segni
- On Her Wedding Night (1915) as Henry Hallam
- Kennedy Square (1916) as Harry Rutter
- The Supreme Temptation (1916) as Herbert Dubois
- Susie, the Sleuth (1916, Short) as Hank Handy
- She Won the Prize (1916, Short) as Charles Adams - a Young Businessman
- The Shop Girl (1916) as Peter Rolls
- The Tarantula (1916) as Pedro Mendoza
- The Devil's Prize (1916) as Hugh Roland
- Rose of the South (1916) as Dick Randolph
- Her Right to Live (1917) as John Oxmore
- Money Magic (1917) as Ben Fordyce
- Aladdin from Broadway (1917) as Jack Stanton
- Captain of the Gray Horse Troop (1917) as Capt. George Curtis
- The Magnificent Meddler (1917) as Montague Emerson
- A Son of the Hills (1917) as Sandy Morley
- By Right of Possession (1917) as Tom Baxter
- The Angel Factory (1917) as David Darrow
- The Mark of Cain (1917) as Kane Langdon
- Sylvia of the Secret Service (1917) as Undetermined Secondary Role (uncredited)
- The Naulahka (1918) as Nicholas Tarvin
- The House of Hate (1918) as Harvey 'Harry' Gresham
- The First Law (1918) as Hugh Godwin
- The Iron Test (1918) as Albert Beresford
- Perils of Thunder Mountain (1919) as John Davis
- The Invisible Hand (1920) as John 'The Needle' Sharpe
- The Veiled Mystery (1920) as Ralph Moore
- Three Sevens (1921) as Daniel Craig
- The Secret of the Hills (1921) as Guy Fenton
- A Guilty Conscience (1921) as Gilbert Thurstan
- My American Wife (1922) as Manuel La Tessa
- Lost and Found on a South Sea Island (1923) as Lloyd Warren
- Look Your Best (1923) as Carlo Bruni
- The Trail of the Lonesome Pine (1923) as John Hale
- The Exciters (1923) as Pierre Martel
- The Spanish Dancer (1923) as Don Cesar de Bazan
- Flaming Barriers (1924) as Sam Barton
- Bluff (1924) as Robert Fitzmaurice
- Tiger Love (1924) as The Wildcat
- The Border Legion (1924) as Jim Cleve
- The Story Without a Name (1924) as Alan Holt
- Hello, 'Frisco (1924) as Himself
- Learning to Love (1925) as Scott Warner
- Her Husband's Secret (1925) as Elliot Owen
- One Year to Live (1925) as Captain Tom Kendrick
- Mare Nostrum (1926) as Ulysses Ferragut
- Beverly of Graustark (1926) as Dantan
- The Temptress (1926) as Manuel Robledo
- Love's Blindness (1926) as Hubert Culverdale, 8th Earl of St. Austel
- The Flaming Forest (1926) as Sergeant David Carrigan
- It (1927) as Cyrus T. Waltham
- Venus of Venice (1927) as Kenneth Wilson
- Madame Pompadour (1927) as Rene Laval
- Come to My House (1927) as Floyd Bennings
- The Whip Woman (1928) as Count Michael Ferenzi
- Nameless Men (1928) as Robert Strong
- The Midnight Taxi (1928) as Tony Driscoll
- Adoration (1928) as Prince Serge Orloff
- Synthetic Sin (1929) as Donald Anthony
- The Air Legion (1929) as Steve Rogers
- Careers (1929) as Victor Gromaire
- Romance of the Rio Grande (1929) as Juan
- El cuerpo del delito (1930) as Harry Gray
- Rough Romance (1930) as Loup La Tour
- El hombre malo (1930) as Pancho Lopez
- One Mad Kiss (1930) as Don Estrada
- El precio de un beso (1930) as Estrada
- La Voluntad del muerto (1930) as Pablo
- Los que danzan (1930) as Daniel Hogan / Frank 'Cicatriz' Turner
- Primavera en otoño (1933) as Enrique
- La ciudad de cartón (1934) as Fred Collins
- Señora casada necesita marido (1935) as Tomás Karen
- Asegure a su mujer (1935) as Eduardo Martin
- Storm Over the Andes (1935) as Maj. Tovar Rojas
- Rosa de Francia (1935) as Felipe V
- Alas sobre El Chaco (1935) as Comandante Manuel Tovar
- The Bohemian Girl (1936) as Devilshoof
- Rose of the Rio Grande (1938) as Captain Lugo
- Ambush (1939) as Captain Mike Gonzalez
- María de la O (1939) as Pedro Lucas / Mr More
- Seven Sinners (1940) as Rubio
- They Met in Argentina (1941) as Don Carlos, 100 Peso Donor (uncredited)
- The Kid from Kansas (1941) as Chief of Police (uncredited)
- Two Latins from Manhattan (1941) as Cuban
- Fiesta (1941) as Don Hernandez - Cholita's Uncle
- Valley of the Sun (1942) as Chief Cochise
- Undercover Man (1942) as Don Tomas Gonzales
- Tampico (1944) as Justice of the Peace (uncredited)
- The Spanish Main (1945) as Commandante
- Sol y sombra (1946) as Manuel Campos
- Notorious (1946) as Senor Ortiza (uncredited)
- Captain from Castile (1947) as Don Francisco De Vargas
- Lust for Gold (1949) as Ramon Peralta (uncredited)
- Crisis (1950) as Dr. Emilio Nierra (uncredited)
- Saddle Tramp (1950) as Martinez
- Dallas (1950) as Don Felipe Robles
- The Mark of the Renegade (1951) as Jose De Vasquez
- Thunder Bay (1953) as Dominique Rigaud
- Wings of the Hawk (1953) as Father Perez
- Creature from the Black Lagoon (1954) as Carl Maia
- Entre barracas (1954)
- Saskatchewan (1954) as Chief Dark Cloud
- The Searchers (1956) as Emilio Gabriel Fernandez y Figueroa
- Catch Me If You Can (1959)
