= The Virtuous Model =

1919 film by Albert Capellani

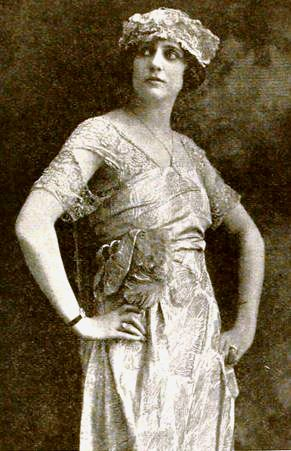
- Cassinelli in film
- Directed by: Albert Capellani
- Written by: Albert Capellani
- Based on: Le ruisseau (play) by Pierre Wolff
- Produced by: Albert Capellani
- Starring: Dolores Cassinelli; Helen Lowell; May Hopkins
- Cinematography: Lucien N. Andriot
- Production company: Albert Capellani Productions
- Distributed by: Pathé Exchange
- Release date: September 14, 1919
- Running time: 60 minutes
- Country: United States
- Language: Silent (English intertitles)

The Virtuous Model is a 1919 American silent drama film directed by Albert Capellani and starring Dolores Cassinelli, Helen Lowell, and May Hopkins.

The film's sets were designed by the French art director Henri Ménessier.

== Cast ==
- Dolores Cassinelli as Denise Fleury
- Helen Lowell as Mrs. Fleury
- May Hopkins as Suzanne Carton
- Vincent Serrano as Paul Brehant
- Franklyn Farnum as Edward Dorin
- Paul Doucet as Jacques Le Sage
- Marie Chambers as Contess Olga Vosloff
- Saville De Sacia
- Albert Roccardi

== Preservation ==
A copy of The Virtuous Model is in the George Eastman Museum Motion Picture Collection.

== Bibliography ==
- Langman, Larry. Destination Hollywood: The Influence of Europeans on American Filmmaking. McFarland, 2000.
