= The Torrent (1921 film) =

1921 film

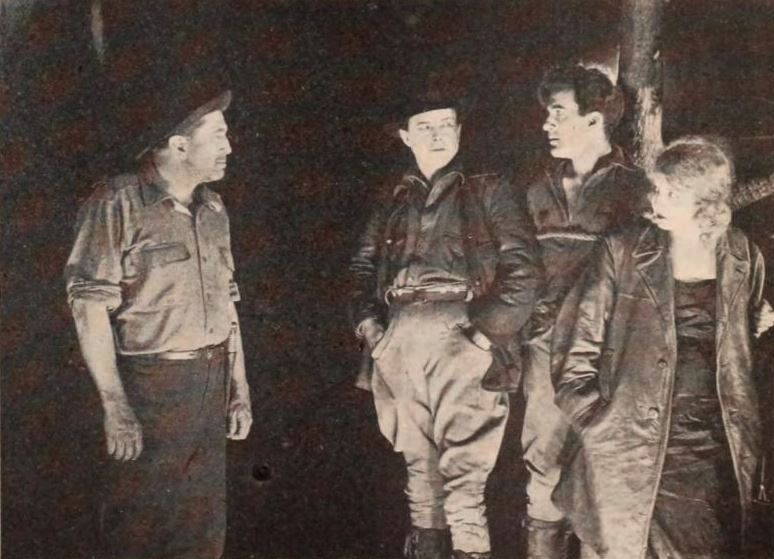
- Directed by: Stuart Paton
- Written by: Wallace Clifton; Philip D. Hurn
- Based on: Out of the Sunset by George Rix
- Produced by: Carl Laemmle
- Starring: Eva Novak; Elita Proctor Otis; Jack Perrin
- Cinematography: Bert Glennon; Roland Price
- Production company: Universal Pictures
- Distributed by: Universal Pictures
- Release date: January 22, 1921
- Running time: 50 minutes
- Country: United States
- Languages: Silent; English intertitles

The Torrent is a 1921 American silent adventure film directed by Stuart Paton and starring Eva Novak, Elita Proctor Otis and Jack Perrin.

== Cast ==
- Eva Novak as Velma Patton
- Elita Proctor Otis as Anne Mayhew
- Jack Perrin as Lt. Paul Mack
- Lee Shumway as Sam Patton
- Jack Curtis as Red Galvin
- Harry Carter as Jud Rossen
- Bert Alpino as First Mate

== Bibliography ==
- Connelly, Robert B. The Silents: Silent Feature Films, 1910-36, Volume 40, Issue 2. December Press, 1998.
- Munden, Kenneth White. The American Film Institute Catalog of Motion Pictures Produced in the United States, Part 1. University of California Press, 1997.
