= Racing Romance (1926 film) =

1926 film

- Directed by: Harry Joe Brown
- Written by: Henry Roberts Symonds
- Produced by: Harry Joe Brown; W. Ray Johnston
- Starring: Reed Howes; Virginia Brown Faire; Harry Northrup
- Cinematography: William H. Tuers
- Production company: Harry J. Brown Productions
- Distributed by: Rayart Pictures
- Release date: August 9, 1926
- Country: United States
- Languages: Silent; English intertitles

Racing Romance is a 1926 American silent action film directed by Harry Joe Brown and starring Reed Howes, Virginia Brown Faire and Harry Northrup.

== Cast ==
- Reed Howes as Howard Billings
- Virginia Brown Faire as Isabel Channing
- Harry Northrup as Mr. Channing
- Mathilde Brundage as Mrs. Channing
- Victor Potel as Constable
- Ethan Laidlaw as Thornhill
- William Barrymore as Henchman

== Bibliography ==
- Munden, Kenneth White. The American Film Institute Catalog of Motion Pictures Produced in the United States, Part 1. University of California Press, 1997.
