= The Tarantula =

1916 film by George D. Baker

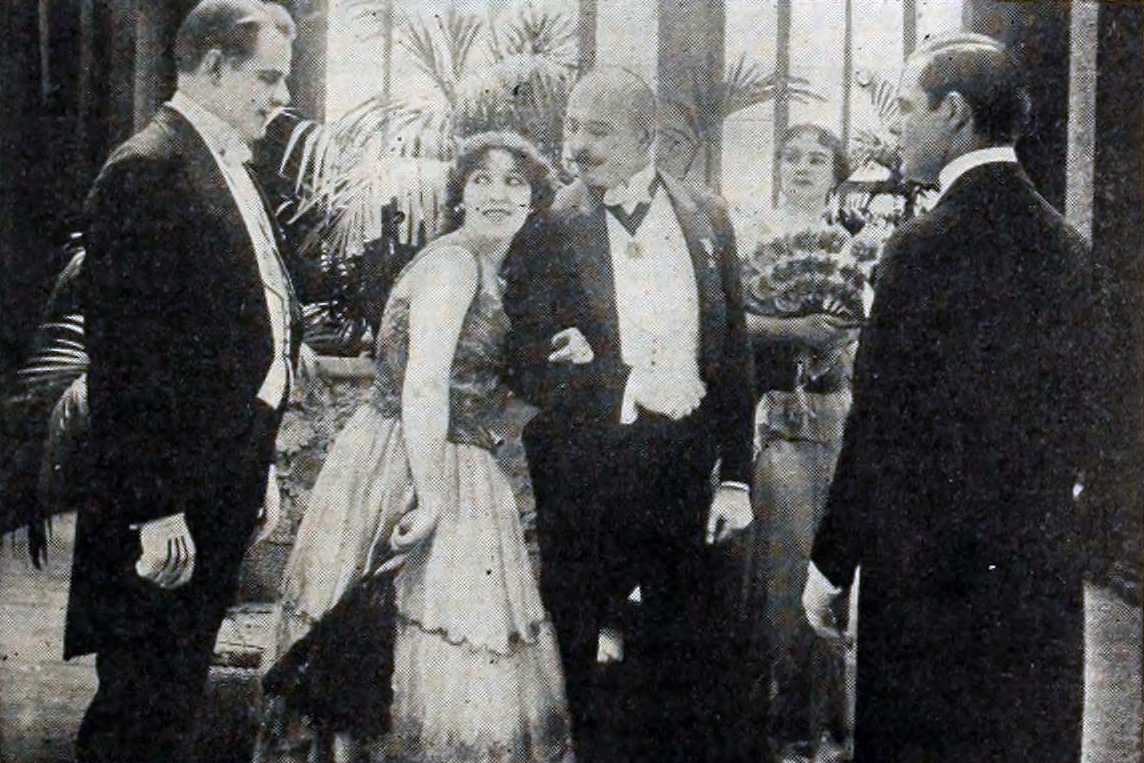
- Directed by: George D. Baker
- Written by: George D. Baker
- Starring: Edith Storey; Antonio Moreno
- Production company: Vitagraph Company of America
- Distributed by: Vitagraph Company of America
- Release date: 17 July 1916
- Running time: 5 reels
- Country: United States
- Language: Silent (English intertitles)

The Tarantula is a lost 1916 American silent drama film written and directed by George D. Baker and starring Edith Storey and Antonio Moreno.

== Cast ==
- Edith Storey as Chonita Alvarado
- Antonio Moreno as Pedro Mendoza
- Charles Kent as Van Allen
- Eulalie Jensen as Donna Luz
- L. Rogers Lytton as Senor Alvarado
- Harry Hollingsworth as Teddy Steele
- Emanuel A. Turner as Beauty Smythe
- Raymond Walburn as Saunders

== Preservation ==
With no holdings located in archives, The Tarantula is considered a lost film.
