= The Christian (1914 film) =

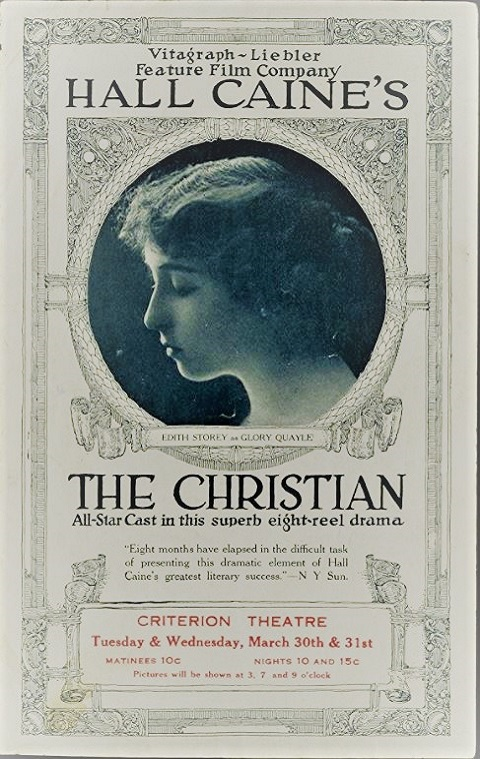
- Program cover featuring the film's costar Edith Storey
- Directed by: Frederick A. Thomson; Frederick Stanhope (assistant director)
- Written by: Eugene Mullin; Hall Caine (scenario)
- Based on: The Christian by Hall Caine
- Produced by: J. Stuart Blackton
- Starring: Earle Williams; Edith Storey
- Cinematography: Orestes A. Zangrilli
- Distributed by: Vitagraph-Libler
- Release date: March 16, 1914
- Running time: 2,400 meters 8 reels
- Country: United States
- Languages: Silent film (English intertitles)

The Christian (1914) is a silent film drama, directed by Frederick A. Thomson, and costarring Earle Williams and Edith Storey. The film is based on the novel The Christian by Hall Caine, published in 1897, the first British novel to reach the record of one million copies sold. The novel was adapted for the stage, opening on Broadway at the Knickerbocker Theatre 10 October 1898. This was the second film of the story; the first, The Christian (1911) was made in Australia.

== Plot ==
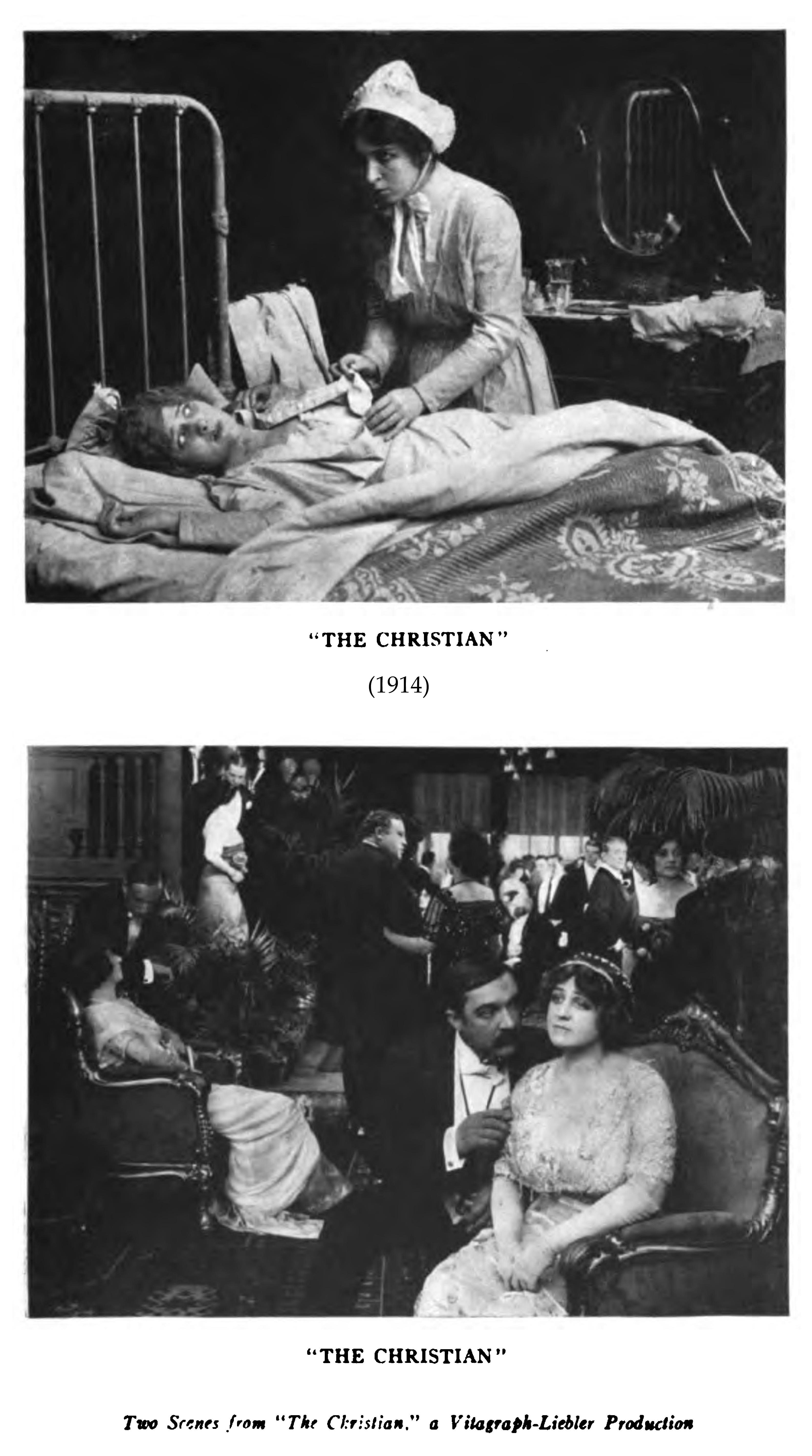
Stills from the film

John Storm decides to enter a monastery after his girlfriend Glory Quayle becomes a diva of London's stages. Not being able to forget Glory, John leaves the monastery to devote himself to the destitute and opens a refuge in the London slums. Glory, who has become his neighbour, tells him about her friend Polly who was pregnant by Lord Robert Ure, an aristocrat. As an unmarried mother Polly is disgraced and is dismissed from the hospital where she works as a nurse. John confronts Ure telling him to do his duty by marrying the girl. Ure, enraged by Storm's interference, marries Vera, a rich American woman. John publicly exposes Ure, but he takes his revenge by spreading the word that Storm makes catastrophic predictions and is announcing the end of the world on Derby Day. Riots break out in the slums. Glory manages to convince people that John is innocent of Ure's accusations. John and Glory decide to spend their lives together.

== Production ==
The Christian was produced by the Vitagraph Company of America in association with the Liebler Company. It was the first eight reel film they made. Shooting was done in part at North Scituate in Rhode Island, at Winthrop Beach, in Massachusetts and in several places between Boston and Philadelphia. Frederick Stanhope, assistant to Frederick A. Thomson, was the theatrical director who had performed the Broadway work for Liebler Co. Viola Allen, the show's star, wanted to play Glory Quayle in the film, but Edith Storey wanted the role for herself. Caine wrote the film scenario, the first time ever that a famous author undertook a film scenario of their own work. Vitagraph staff writer Eugene Mullins followed Caine's scenario.

== Distribution ==
Distributed by the Vitagraph-Liebler Feature Film Company, The Christian was released in US cinemas on 16 March 1914. It premiered in New York at the Manhattan Opera House. Vitagraph leased the Harris Theatre on West 42nd Street, for the purpose of exclusively showing their own films, opening with The Christian.

A new edition of it was made in 1917 by the Greater Vitagraph (V-L-S-E, Incorporated).

== Cast ==
- Edith Storey - Glory Quayle
- Carlotta De Felice - Polly Love
- Harry Northrup - Lord Robert Ure
- Donald Hall - Francis Horatio Drake
- Alberta Gallatin - Mrs. MacCrae, a wealthy American widow
- Jane Fearnley - Vera MacCrae, her daughter
- James Lackaye - Archdeacon Wealthy
- Charles Kent - Father Lamplugh
- Earle Williams - John Storm
- James Morrison - Brother Paul, Polly Love's brother
- Edward Kimball - Lord Storm, John Storm's father
- J. W. Sambrook - Parson Quayle
