= Money Magic =

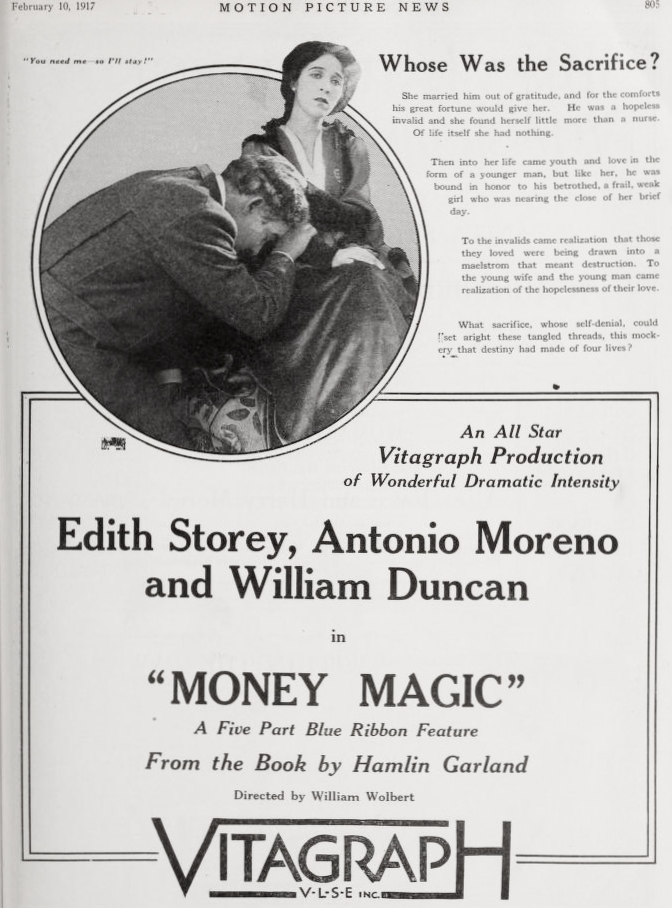
- Directed by: William Wolbert
- Written by: Hamlin Garland (novel); A. Van Buren Powell
- Starring: Antonio Moreno; Laura Winston; Edith Storey
- Cinematography: W. Steve Smith Jr.
- Production company: Vitagraph Company of America
- Distributed by: Vitagraph Company of America
- Release date: February 5, 1917
- Running time: 50 minutes
- Country: United States
- Languages: Silent; English intertitles

Money Magic is a 1917 American silent drama film directed by William Wolbert and starring Antonio Moreno, Laura Winston and Edith Storey.

== Cast ==
- Antonio Moreno as Ben Fordyce
- Laura Winston as Mrs. Gilman
- Edith Storey as Bertha Gilman
- William Duncan as Marshall Haney
- Florence Dye as Alice Heath

== Bibliography ==
- Goble, Alan. The Complete Index to Literary Sources in Film. Walter de Gruyter, 1999.
