= Arthur Somers Roche =

American author

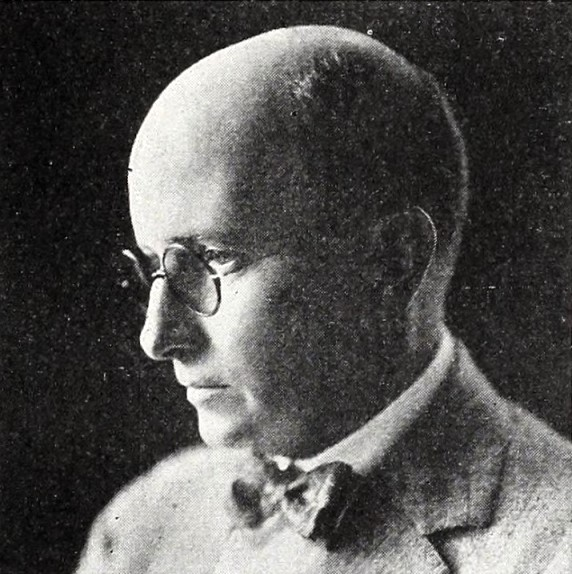
- From a 1925 magazine
- Born: April 27, 1883; Somerville, Massachusetts, US
- Died: February 17, 1935 (aged 51); Palm Beach, Florida, US
- Occupations: Writer, playwright
- Relatives: James Jeffrey Roche (father)
- Writing career
- Genre: Fiction

Arthur Somers Roche (April 27, 1883 – February 17, 1935) was an American author of novels, short stories, and two plays.

== Biography ==
Arthur Somers Roche was born April 27, 1883, in Somerville, Massachusetts. He attended Holy Cross College from 1899 to 1901, then studied law at Boston University, graduating in 1904. Roche initially practiced law, but after 18 months, he switched careers and entered the newspaper business with The New York World. In 1910, he began to write fiction, contributing stories to magazines. His first story sold for $6, the second, for $25, after which he began to command higher prices for his output. In 1916, his first novel, Loot, was published. Two years later, in September 1918, he was commissioned a captain in the Military Intelligence Division of the United States Army.

Roche was married twice. His first wife was Ethel Kirby Nowell of New York; she died in 1915. He then married Ethel Pettit of Stuttgart, Arkansas, in 1917. Roche died February 17, 1935, in Palm Beach, Florida. He was 51.

== Literary style ==
Roche's work has been described as light fiction that was "carefully plotted and up to the minute in subject matter." His novels were of the mystery thriller genre, often with fast-paced action taking place in unusual situations. In a few instances, he introduced a super detective.

In total, Roche wrote around 30 books, several of which were published posthumously, and numerous short stories. He also penned a play, The Crooks' Convention, and was co-author of another, The Scrap of Paper, with Owen Davis.

== Works ==
- Loot (Indianapolis: The Bobbs-Merrill Company, 1916)
- Plunder (Indianapolis: The Bobbs-Merrill Company, 1917)
- The Scrap Of Paper [play, with co-author Owen Davis; originally a short story published in the Saturday Evening Post], (1917)
- Sport Of Kings (Indianapolis: The Bobbs-Merrill Company, 1918)
- Eyes Of The Blind (New York: George H. Doran Co., 1919; A. L. Burt, 1919)
- Ransom (New York: George H. Doran Company, 1918; A. L. Burt Co., 1920)
- Uneasy Street (New York: Cosmopolitan Book Corporation, 1920)
- Day of Faith (Boston: Little Brown, 1921)
- Find the Woman (New York: Cosmopolitan Book Corporation, 1921)
- More Honorable Man (New York: The Macmillan Company, 1922)
- John Ainsley, Master Thief (1924)
- The Pleasure Buyers (New York: The Macmillan company, 1925)
- Devil-May-Care (New York: The Century Company, 1926)
- Come to My House (New York: The Century Company, 1927)
- What I Know About You (New York: J.H. Sears & Co., Inc., 1927)
- No Stockings (Boston: Boston-American, 1928); softcover, 32 pp., complete novella issued by a Boston newspaper
- Wise Wife (New York: The Century Company, 1928)
- Marriage for Two (New York: J. H. Sears & Co., Inc., 1929)
- The Woman Hunters (New York: The Century Company, 1929)
- Age of Youth (New York: Sears, 1930)
- Among Those Present (New York: Sears Publishing Co., 1930)
- Four Blocks Apart (New York: Sears Publishing Co., 1931)
- Rhapsody in Gold (New York: Sears Publishing Co., 1931)
- Gracious Lady (New York: Sears Publishing Co., 1932; A. L. Burt, 1932)
- Wrong Wife (New York: Sears Publishing Co., 1932)
- Great Abduction (New York: Sears Publishing Co., 1933)
- The Case Against Mrs. Ames (New York: Dodd, Mead and Co., 1934)
- Conspiracy (New York: Sears Publishing Co., 1934)
- Shadow of Doubt (New York, Dodd, Mead and Co., 1935)
- Penthouse (New York: Dodd: Mead and Co., 1935)
- In the Money (New York: Dodd, Mead and Co., 1936)
- Star of Midnight (New York: Dodd, Mead and Co., 1936)
- Callingham's Girl [with co-author Ethel Pettit Roche] (New York: Dodd, Mead and Co., 1937)
- Hard to Get (New York: Dodd, Mead and Co., 1937)
- Lady of Resource (New York: Dodd, Mead and Co., 1938)

=== Partial filmography ===
- Over the Wire (1921)
- Kissed (1922)
- The Day of Faith (1923)
- The Pleasure Buyers (1925)
- The Girl from Chicago (1927)
- Come to My House (1927)
- Man, Woman and Wife (1929)
- Penthouse (1933)
- Society Lawyer (1939)
