= The Day of Faith =

1923 film

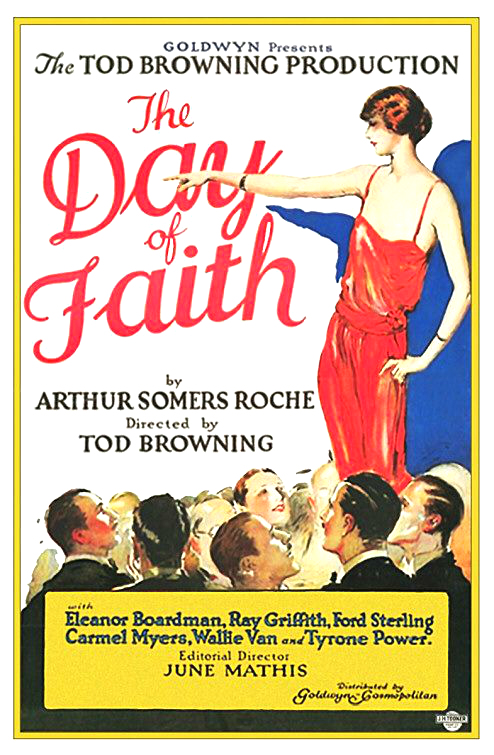
- Film poster
- Directed by: Tod Browning
- Written by: Katharine Kavanaugh; June Mathis
- Based on: The Day of Faith by Arthur Somers Roche
- Produced by: Samuel Goldwyn
- Starring: Eleanor Boardman; Tyrone Power Sr.
- Cinematography: William Fildew
- Distributed by: Goldwyn Pictures
- Release date: October 21, 1923
- Running time: 70 minutes
- Country: United States
- Language: Silent (English intertitles)

The Day of Faith is a 1923 American silent drama film directed by Tod Browning starring Eleanor Boardman, Tyrone Power Sr., and Raymond Griffith.

== Plot ==
As described in a film magazine review, Jane Maynard opens a mission in the New York City slums in the memory of philanthropist Bland Hendricks which uses the motto "My Neighbor is Perfect." She welcomes outcasts and faith cures are made. Michael Anstell, the son of a millionaire, is attracted to Jane. His father employs reporter Tom Barnett to ridicule the mission, but Tom becomes a convert. Old John Anstell then backs the mission, believing that, in the name of reform, he can control the world. Detected, his son Michael is killed by a mob. Tom Barnett and Jane Maynard carry on the mission's work.

== Cast ==
- Eleanor Boardman as Jane Maynard
- Tyrone Power Sr. as Michael Anstell (credited as Tyrone Power)
- Raymond Griffith as Tom Barnett
- Wallace MacDonald as John Anstell
- Ford Sterling as Montreal Sammy
- Heinie Conklin as Yegg Darby (credited as Charles Conklin)
- Ruby Lafayette as Granny Maynard
- Jane Mercer as Red Johnston's child
- Edward Martindel as Uncle Mortimer
- Winter Hall as Bland Hendricks
- Emmett King as Simmons
- Jack Curtis as Red Johnson
- Frederick Vroom as Marley Maynard
- John Curry as Isaac
- Henry Hebert as Samuel Jackson (credited as Henry Herbert)
- Miles McCarthy as Kelly (credited as Myles McCarthy)
- Robert Dudley as Morris

== Production ==
With no prints of The Day of Faith located in any film archives, it is a lost film.
