= Penthouse (film) =

1933 film by W. S. Van Dyke

- theatrical poster
- Directed by: W. S. Van Dyke
- Screenplay by: Frances Goodrich; Albert Hackett
- Based on: Penthouse; 1935 novel by Arthur Somers Roche
- Produced by: W. S. Van Dyke
- Starring: Warner Baxter; Myrna Loy
- Cinematography: Lucien N. Andriot; Harold Rosson
- Edited by: Robert J. Kern
- Music by: William Axt
- Production companies: Cosmopolitan Productions; Metro-Goldwyn-Mayer
- Distributed by: Loew's Inc.
- Release date: September 8, 1933 (U.S.)
- Running time: 90 minutes
- Country: United States
- Language: English

Penthouse is a 1933 American pre-Code crime film starring Warner Baxter as a lawyer and Myrna Loy as a call girl who helps him with a murder case. The film features Charles Butterworth as Baxter's butler, Mae Clarke as the murder victim, Phillips Holmes as the suspected murderer, and C. Henry Gordon as the gangster who arranged the murder. It was directed by W. S. Van Dyke and written by Frances Goodrich and Albert Hackett, based on a novel by Arthur Somers Roche. The film was later remade as the more sanitized Society Lawyer (1939), without the risqué pre-Code dialogue.

== Plot ==
Attorney Jack Durant successfully defends racketeer Tony Gaziotti against a high-profile murder charge and waives his fee. His staid law firm feels his taking the racketeer on as a client reflects badly on them; when he refuses to give up his exciting new line of work, they go their separate ways. His upper class girlfriend Sue Leonard turns down his proposal and breaks up with him for the same reason. Shortly afterward, Sue agrees to marry Tom Siddall, but only if he gives up his mistress, Mimi Montagne. Although Tom offers Mimi a generous settlement, she becomes furious.

Mimi quickly returns to her former lover, gangster Jim Crelliman. He has her get Tom to meet her at a raucous party. After they go out on the balcony to talk, a shot is heard; the revelers find Mimi dead, and Tom with a revolver in his hand. A pawnbroker named Levitoff tells the police that he sold Tom the gun the same day. Sue begs Jack to defend Tom. He agrees, even though he gets an anonymous phone call telling him to stay out of it.

Jack asks Tony to find out what he can. Tony introduces him to Gertie Waxted, who was Mimi's friend and at the party. She tells him that she arrived after the murder, but he thinks she still may know something useful, so he invites her to spend the night in his suite. To her great surprise, however, he sleeps on the couch.

The next morning, Sue asks Jack to drop the case because she has received a call threatening his life. When Gertie appears in Jack's robe, Sue hastily departs, even though Gertie tells her that Jack is still in love with her.

Jack questions the pawnbroker without success. After he leaves, Levitoff is murdered. Jack goes to Gertie's apartment (directly across from the murder scene) to get some clothes for her. Crelliman shows up and offers him $200,000 to take a long vacation. When Jack turns him down, Crelliman threatens him. Jack leaves and breaks into the apartment directly above Gertie's, which he has learned belongs to Murtoch, one of Crelliman's gunmen. From the entry and exit wounds on Mimi's body, he is sure the murderer was situated higher up; the angle from Murtoch's window is about right. A helpful elevator operator warns Jim that Crelliman's men are waiting for him in the lobby and leads him to the service elevator.

Jack sees Gertie in a club with Murtoch and jumps to conclusions. When she returns to Jack's apartment, he is mad until she tells him that she had to get Murtoch out of his apartment so Jack would not run into him when he broke in. He apologizes and admits he has fallen in love with her. He asks Gertie to marry him, but they are interrupted by a phone call from Tony, who has found out that Crelliman has decided to have Murtoch killed. Jack takes along Police Lieutenant "Steve" Stevens and several of his men to trick Murtoch into confessing. Gertie volunteers to lure Crelliman out onto the roof of the other building. After capturing Murtoch, Jack tells him that they will frame him for Crelliman's impending murder. Murtoch eventually cracks and confesses.

Meanwhile, Gertie tells Crelliman that she frightened Jack into accepting his offer, but he does not believe her and tells his men to take her "for a ride". Jack and the police hear gunfire. When they rush over, they find Crelliman and his henchmen all dead. Gertie and Tony are in the next room. Tony saved Gertie, but he himself collapses and dies from a gunshot wound.

Later, Gertie is packing to leave, thinking that Jack is getting back together with Sue. He tells Gertie that he wants to marry her and take her to Europe. When she reminds him she is no lady, he tells her she will do until one comes along.

== Cast ==
- Warner Baxter as Jackson "Jack" Durant
- Myrna Loy as Gertie Waxted
- Charles Butterworth as Layton
- Mae Clarke as Mimi Montagne
- Phillips Holmes as Tom Siddall
- C. Henry Gordon as Jim Crelliman
- Martha Sleeper as Sue Leonard
- Nat Pendleton as Tony Gaziotti
- George E. Stone as Tim Murtoch
- Robert Emmett O'Connor as Police Lieutenant "Steve" Stevens
- Raymond Hatton as Angel (short bodyguard)
- Arthur Belasco as Tall bodyguard
- Samuel S. Hinds as Law firm partner
- Theresa Harris as Lily
- Tom Kennedy as Joe

== Production ==
The working title of Penthouse was "Penthouse Legend." Baxter was borrowed from Warner Bros. for the film. The film was the first pairing of Loy and director W. S. Van Dyke, who directed many of the Thin Man films which would make Loy a star. Penthouse screenwriters Frances Goodrich and Albert Hackett wrote the screenplays for three of the six Thin Man films: The Thin Man (1934), After the Thin Man (1936), and Another Thin Man (1939).

After directing Penthouse, Van Dyke told MGM production boss Louis B. Mayer that Loy would be a big star if she continued to receive the right kinds of roles.
