= Over the Wire =

1921 film

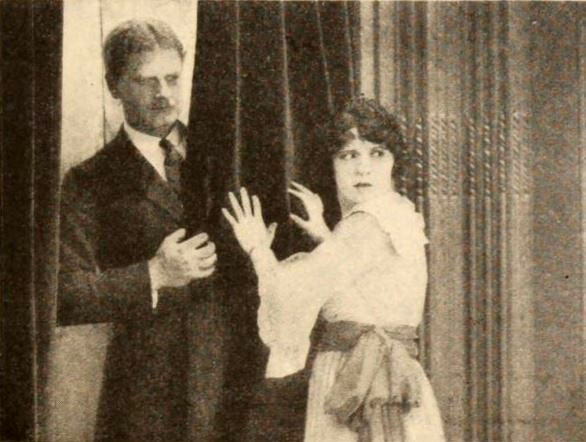
- Directed by: Wesley Ruggles
- Written by: Edward T. Lowe Jr. Arthur Somers Roche
- Starring: Alice Lake; Alan Roscoe; Alan Hale
- Cinematography: Allen G. Siegler
- Production company: Metro Pictures
- Distributed by: Metro Pictures
- Release date: July 18, 1921
- Running time: 60 minutes
- Country: United States
- Languages: Silent; English intertitles

Over the Wire is a 1921 American silent drama film directed by Wesley Ruggles and starring Alice Lake, Alan Roscoe and Alan Hale.

== Plot ==
Terry Dexter embezzles a large sum of money from his employer, John Grannan, and loses it in speculation, then tries to recover the money by gambling. His devoted sister Kathleen gives him securities to cover the loss, but Grannan refuses to accept them, hoping to teach Terry a lesson. The terror-stricken boy commits suicide, and Kathleen vows revenge on the employer. With the aid of James Twyford she becomes Grannan's secretary and persuades him to marry her, and after revealing her motive she elopes with Twyford, but Grannan defeats their plans. When Twyford tries to kill Grannan, he is foiled by Kathleen, who realizes her wrong and admits that she now loves her husband.

== Cast ==
- Alice Lake as Kathleen Dexter
- Alan Roscoe as John Grannan
- George Stewart as Terry Dexter
- Alan Hale as James Twyford

== Bibliography ==
- Connelly, Robert B. The Silents: Silent Feature Films, 1910-36, Volume 40, Issue 2. December Press, 1998.
- Munden, Kenneth White. The American Film Institute Catalog of Motion Pictures Produced in the United States, Part 1. University of California Press, 1997.
