= The Infidel (1922 film) =

1922 film

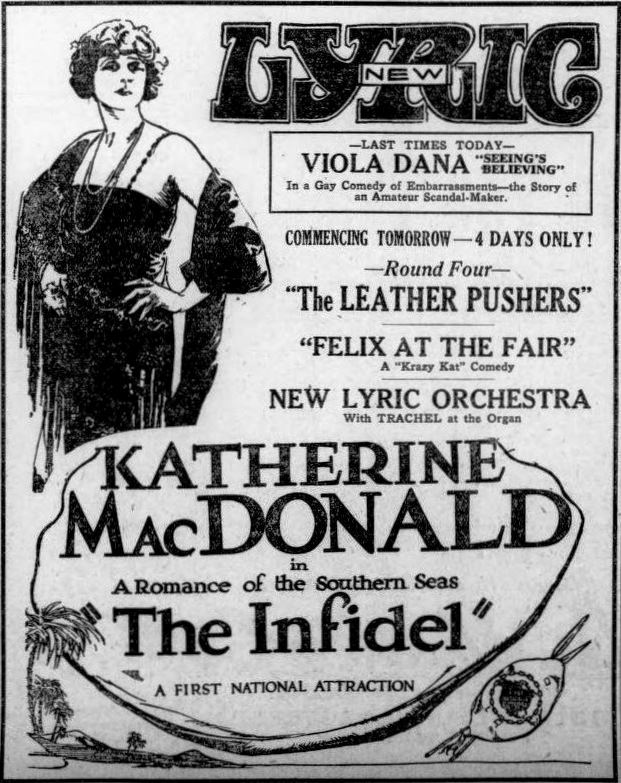
- Newspaper ad
- Directed by: James Young
- Written by: James Young (screenplay); Charles Logue (story)
- Produced by: B.P. Schulberg
- Starring: Katherine MacDonald; Robert Ellis; Joseph Dowling; Boris Karloff
- Cinematography: Joseph Brotherton
- Production company: Preferred Pictures
- Distributed by: Associated First National Pictures
- Release date: April 2, 1922
- Running time: 60 minutes
- Country: United States
- Language: Silent (English intertitles)

The Infidel is a 1922 American silent drama film written and directed by James Young and featuring Katherine MacDonald, Robert Ellis, Joseph Dowling and Boris Karloff. Young wrote the screenplay based on a story by Charles A. Logue. The film is considered to be lost. The film's tagline was "Man-Bait! Sent out, willingly, to a Pacific Paradise where the world forgets. Sent there to wreck a two-fisted, fighting gentleman with her faithlessness... And instead wrecking her own heart with her own love." (Print Ad in the Flushing Daily Times, ((Flushing, NY)) 30 December 1922).

== Plot ==
Lola Daintry, an unemployed actress and infidel hired to play a part in a scheme by Australian "Bully" Haynes and a sailor named Chunky are cast upon the South Sea island of Menang, where are found Cyrus Flint, who owns the copra produced from coconuts, and a missionary named Reverend Mead. Cyrus is attracted to the young woman and shields her from the attentions of the Nabob of Menang, the island's Mohammedan ruler. Haynes, who had planned the castaway stunt with Lola and Chunky, arrives and attempts to break the hold of the mission people on Cyrus so slavery can be reinstated, and to force Cyrus to sell his copra interests. The Nabob becomes a party to the scheme.

After playing her game and luring Cyrus, Lola realizes that she has been duped and that Cyrus and Mead are not the unworthy men they have been painted to be. She confesses to the missionary, during which he discovers that he is Lola's father, but decides not to reveal this to her as she has begun to have faith in him. Lola is scorned by Cyrus, who decides to sell out. He goes aboard Haynes' schooner for a voyage to Australia to sign the papers, leaving the Christians at the mercy of the Nabob.

Lola is rowed out to the vessel by a crew of natives and succeeds in getting aboard. She entreats Cyrus to return to Menang and to send a radio message to an American cruiser to suppress an uprising on the island. Cyrus sees the island buildings in flames and realizes that he has been fooled by Haynes, and attempts to use the radio, but Haynes wrecks the instrument. Cyrus reaches his secret radio, which brings the cruiser to the rescue, which lobs a few shells causing the palace of the Nabob to topple, killing him. The missionary also dies, trusting Cyrus with caring for Lola, whom he has converted. Lola will never know that the missionary was her father.

== Cast ==
- Katherine MacDonald as Lola Daintry
- Robert Ellis as Cyrus Flint
- Joseph J. Dowling as Reverend Mead (credited as Joseph Dowling)
- Boris Karloff as the Nabob of Menang
- Melbourne MacDowell as 'Bully' Haynes
- Elita Proctor Otis as Miss Parliss (credited as Oleta Otis)
- Charles Smiley as Mr. Scudder
- Loyola O'Connor as Mrs. Scudder
- Barbara Tennant as Hope Scudder
- Charles Force as Chunky
