= Come to My House =

1927 film

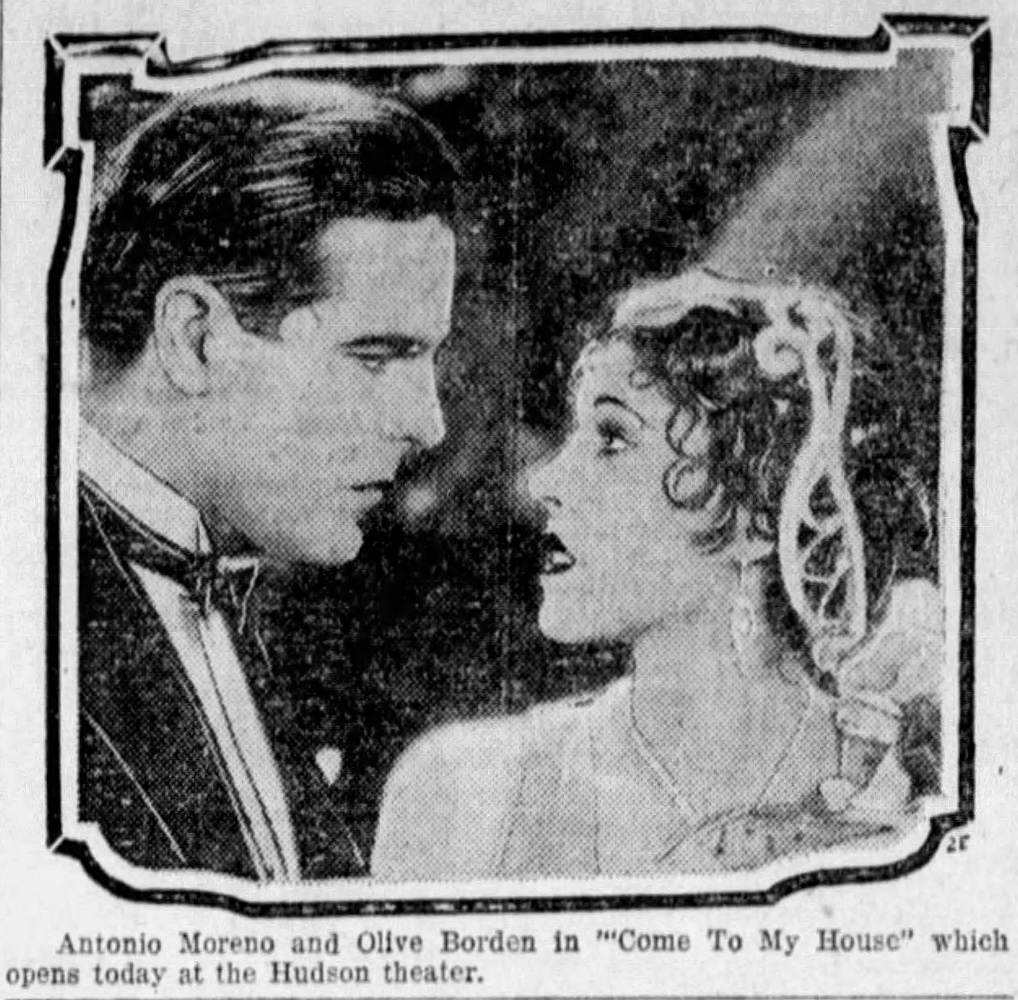
- Scene with Moreno and Borden
- Directed by: Alfred E. Green
- Written by: Malcolm Stuart Boylan; Philip Klein; Marion Orth; Arthur Somers Roche
- Starring: Olive Borden; Antonio Moreno; Ben Bard
- Cinematography: Joseph H. August
- Production company: Fox Film
- Distributed by: Fox Film
- Release date: December 25, 1927
- Running time: 60 minutes
- Country: United States
- Languages: Silent; English intertitles

Come to My House is a 1927 American silent drama film directed by Alfred E. Green and starring Olive Borden, Antonio Moreno and Ben Bard. Based on the novel of the same name by Arthur Somers Roche.

== Cast ==
- Olive Borden as Joan Century
- Antonio Moreno as Floyd Bennings
- Ben Bard as Fraylor
- Cornelius Keefe as Murtaugh Pell
- Doris Lloyd as Renee Parsons
- Richard Maitland as Jimmy Parsons

== Bibliography ==
- Solomon, Aubrey. The Fox Film Corporation, 1915-1935: A History and Filmography. McFarland, 2011.
