= Van Powell =

American writer (1886–1962)

Ardon Van Buren Powell
- Born: March 31, 1886
- Died: August 20, 1962 (aged 76)
- Writing career
- Pen name: Van Powell
- Genre: Adventure

Ardon Van Buren Powell was an American screenwriter in the early years of the movies industry and later a writer of adventure books for boys. He wrote as both A. Van Buren Powell and Van Powell.

== Biography ==
Ardon Van Buren Powell was born in Macon, Georgia and moved to New York with his family as a child. He graduated from Dewitt Clinton High School. Despite being visually impaired from birth, Powell pursued a career as a writer, first as a reviewer of theatrical production for Billboard magazine and later of comedies in the silent film industry. From 1912 to 1921, he worked in the film industry in New York City. Some of his credits were screen adaptations of works by other writers including O. Henry and James Oliver Curwood. In 1919, he wrote The Photoplay Synopsis, a guide to screenplay writers for writing in a synopsis-only format. It has bee noted in more recent overviews of early screenplays that it was among the later works that still primarily talk about dividing the story by reel lengths and Photoplay mentions "a reel is elastic enough to allow of a few feet more or a very few feet less on a reel, so as to permit the proper continuity of scenes".

When the movie industry largely moved to California, Powell remained in New York and began writing adventure novels for boys. He wrote three adventure series: the Bud Bright series, five novels published 1929 to 1931, The Mystery Boys series, five novels published in 1931, and the Sky Scouts series, four novels published in 1932. The Sky Scouts series, unlike his first two series, by being standalone adventures with a different set of characters for each book, although all four feature three teenage boys as their protagonists and some sort of aviation-themed mystery. The first three titles of Sky Scouts were later republished under the Air Mystery Series.

In the early 1940s, with his vision almost completely gone, Powell changed careers and became an insurance broker in Vineland, New Jersey. He resided in the town for the last 35 years of his life, the final 17 of them in a home for the handicapped.

Powell died in Vineland on August 20, 1962. According to his obituary, he was the author of 22 books.

== Filmography ==
Included among Powell's 47 movies credits are:

- 1917: An Alabaster Box
- 1917: Sally in a Hurry
- 1917: Captain of the Gray Horse Troop
- 1917: Clover’s Rebellion
- 1917: The Marriage Speculation
- 1917: Mary Jane's Pa
- 1917: Money Magic
- 1917: The Money Mill
- 1917: Richard the Brazen
- 1917: The Sixteenth Wife
- 1918: Everybody's Girl
- 1918: The Beloved Impostor
- 1918: A Madison Square Arabian Night
- 1919: The Captain's Captain
- 1919: The Girl-Woman
- 1921: Princess Jones

== Bibliography ==
- The Photoplay Synopsis (1919)

=== The Mystery Boys Series ===
- The Mystery Boys and The Chinese Jewells (1931)
- The Mystery Boys and Captain Kidd’s Message (1931)
- The Mystery Boys and the Inca Gold (1931)
- The Mystery Boys and the Hindu Treasure (1931)
- The Mystery Boys and the Secret of the Golden Sun (1931)

=== The Bud Bright Series ===
- Bud Bright, Boy Detective
- Bud Bright and the Drug Ring
- Bud Bright and the Kidnappers
- Bud Bright and the Bank Robbers (1929)
- Bud Bright and the Counterfeiters (1931)

=== Sky Scout Series ===
(First published by A. L. Burt, later reprinted by Saalfield Publishing as the "Air Mystery" series.)

- The Call of the Clouds
- Ace of the Airways
- The Haunted Hanger
- The Mystery Crash
- The Ghost of Mystery Airport (1932)
- The Vanishing Airliner (1932)

=== Other works ===
- Racket Busters
- The Mystery of the 15 Sounds
