= Captain of the Gray Horse Troop =

1917 film

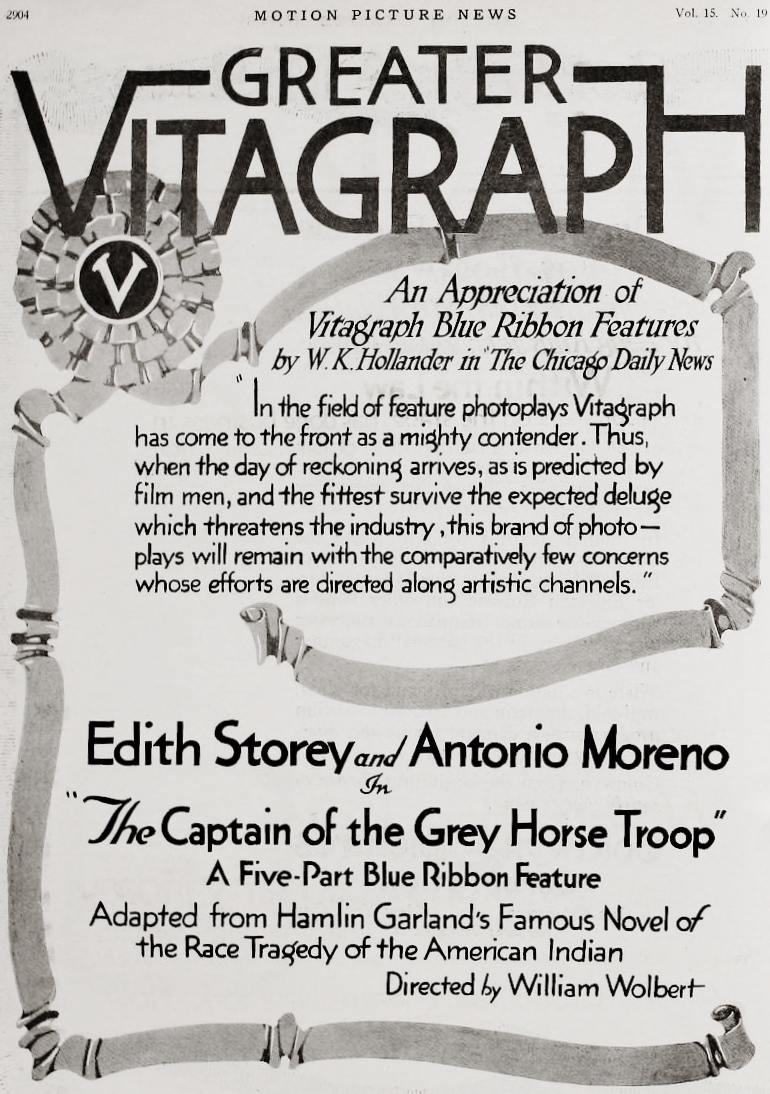
- Directed by: William Wolbert
- Written by: A. Van Buren Powell
- Starring: Antonio Moreno; Edith Storey; Otto Lederer
- Cinematography: Reginald Lyons
- Production company: Vitagraph Company of America
- Distributed by: Vitagraph Company of America
- Release date: May 7, 1917
- Running time: 50 minutes
- Country: United States
- Languages: Silent; English intertitles

Captain of the Gray Horse Troop is a 1917 American silent Western film directed by William Wolbert and starring Antonio Moreno, Edith Storey and Otto Lederer.

== Plot ==
The character Capt. George Curtis is sent to an Indian reservation in order to stabilize conditions after a Native-America kills a Caucasian rancher and a lynch mob ensues.

== Cast ==
- Antonio Moreno as Capt. George Curtis
- Edith Storey as Elsie
- Mrs. Bradbury as Jennie
- Otto Lederer as Crawling Elk
- Al J. Jennings as Cut Finger
- Neola May as Cut Finger's Wife
- Bob Burns as Cal Streeter
- Henry A. Barrows as Ex-Sen. Brisbane

== Preservation ==
With no holdings located in archives, Captain of the Gray Horse Troop is considered a lost film.

== Bibliography ==
- John T. Weaver. Twenty Years of Silents, 1908-1928. Scarecrow Press, 1971.
