= As the Sun Went Down =

1919 film

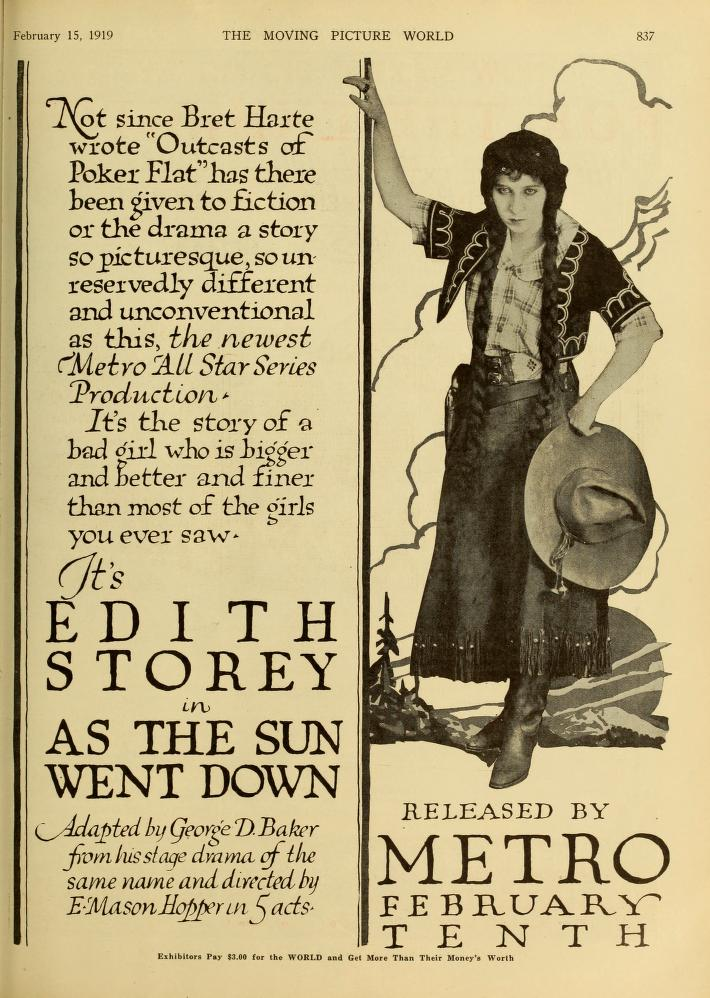
- Directed by: E. Mason Hopper
- Screenplay by: George D. Baker (scenario)
- Based on: the play, As the Sun Went Down by George D. Baker
- Starring: Edith Storey; Lew Cody; Harry S. Northrup
- Cinematography: William C. Thompson
- Production company: Metro Pictures
- Release date: February 10, 1919 (US)
- Running time: 5 reels
- Country: United States
- Languages: Silent; English intertitles

As the Sun Went Down is a 1919 American silent Western film directed by E. Mason Hopper and starring Edith Storey, Lew Cody, and Harry S. Northrup. It was released on February 10, 1919.

== Plot ==
Colonel Billy is an ex-dance hall girl who has now gained a reputation as a gunfighter. She lives on the outskirts of Rattlesnake Gulch, where the women look down on her due to her past, while the men respect her due to her gun. She is in love with Faro Bill, a prospector who has promised to wed Billy once he strikes enough gold. One day the stage brings a preacher, Albert Atherton, and a destitute actor and his wife, Gerald and Mabel Morton, and their infant daughter to town. As a joke on Billy, they send Atherton to her house, saying that she has a room to board. Morton, in order to support his wife and child, files a claim and begins prospecting.

Morton strikes gold, and when word of his strike reaches San Francisco, the gambler Arbuthnot devises a plot to take his claim away from him. He arrives in Rattlesnake Gulch, and forms a team with a local ne'er-do-well, Pizen Ike, and gets him to agree to help in his plan to cheat Morton out of his claim. Arbuthnot has brought fake love letters from Mabel, and when he reveals them, Ike insults her in front of everyone. Feeling the need to protect his wife's reputation, Morton challenges Ike to a duel. This is falling into place as Arbuthnot had predicted. Once Ike kills Morton in the duel, they'll be able to take over the claim.

However, Billy learns of the duel and insists she step into the duel and take the place of Morton, many in the town support her, especially Faro Bill. Resistant at first, Ike agrees. But when he has the opportunity, he sneaks up behind Bill and strikes him over the head. Thinking him dead, he casts him into a crevice. Bill wakes up and begins to dig his way out of the crevice. In the process, he strikes a gold vein. He gets back to town just in time for the duel between Billy and Ike. His presence jars Ike, and Billy wounds him, and he begins to run away. Bill follows him and shoots him again in the shoulder, but the impact causes him to stumble and fall off a cliff.

Exposed, Arbuthnot admits that the letters were forged, and Mabel's name is no longer besmirched. In the aftermath of the duel and Ike's death, it is revealed that Bill is Atherton's long lost brother, and Atherton performs the marriage of Billy and Bill.

== Cast list ==
- Edith Storey as Colonel Billy
- Lew Cody as Faro Bill
- Harry S. Northrup as Arbuthnot
- William Brunton as Albert Atherton
- F. A. Turner as Gerald Morton
- Frances Burnham as Mabel Morton
- ZaSu Pitts as Sal Sue
- F. E. Spooner as Gin Mill Jack
- Alfred Hollingsworth as Pizen Ike
- Vera Lewis as Ike's Wife
- George W. Berrell as Piety Pete
- Pop Taylor
- Cal Dugan

== Preservation ==
With no holdings located in archives, As the Sun Went Down is considered a lost film.

== Production ==
The film was released on February 10, 1919.
