= Harry Northrup =

French-American actor

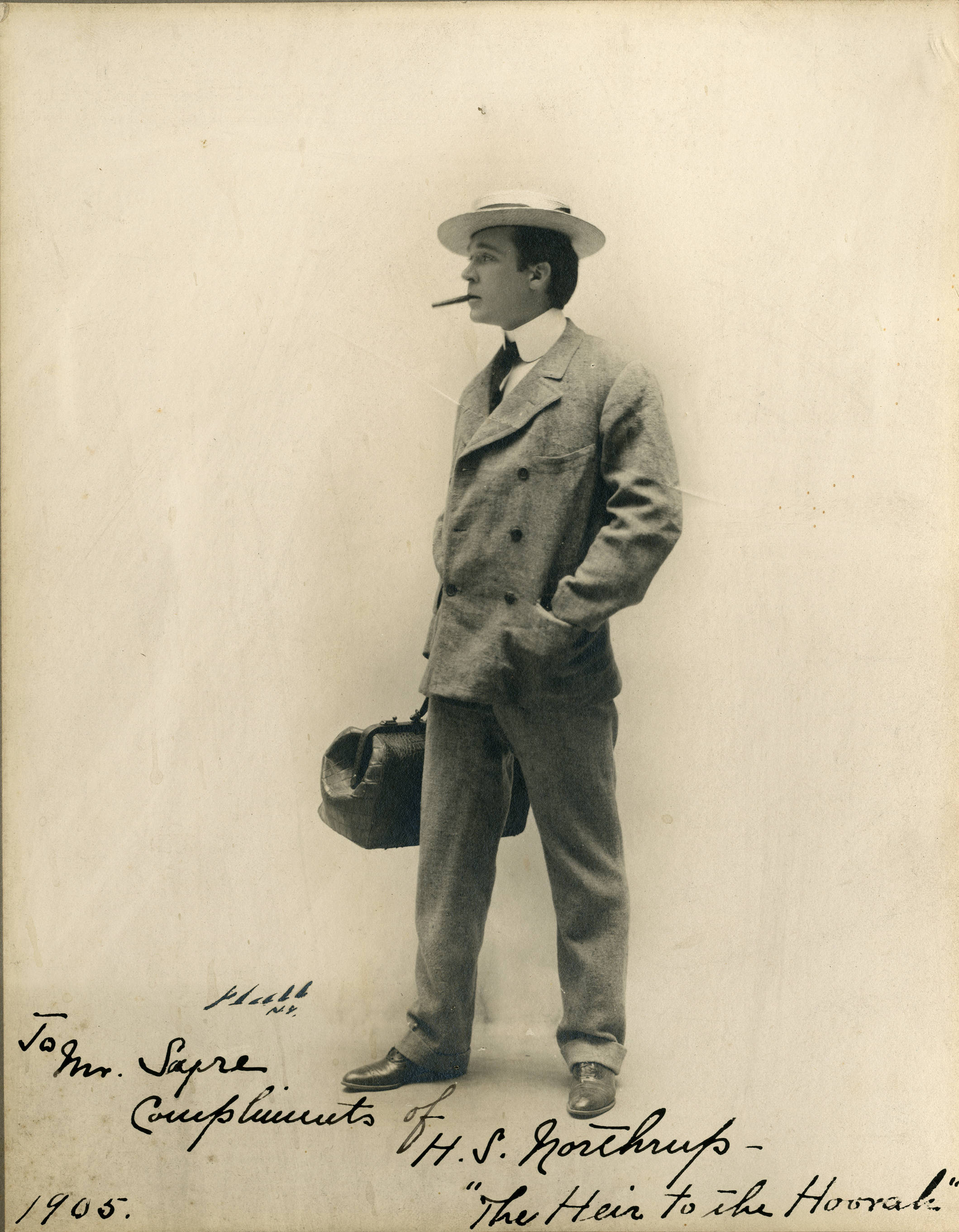
- Northrup in 1905
- Born: Henri Stabo Wallace Northrup; 31 July 1875; Paris, France
- Died: 2 July 1936 (aged 60); Los Angeles, U.S.
- Occupation: Actor
- Years active: 1911–1935

Harry Northrup (born Henri Stabo Wallace Northrup; 31 July 1875 – 2 July 1936), was an American film actor of the silent era. He appeared in more than 130 films between 1911 and 1935. He was born in Paris and died in Los Angeles, California.

== Selected filmography ==
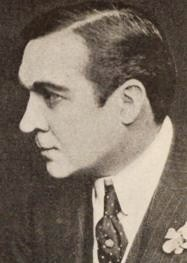
Harry Northrup in 1920.

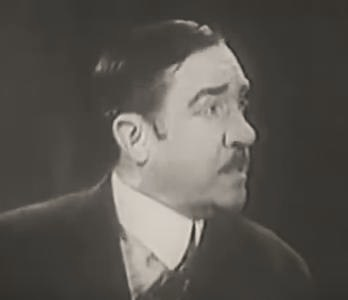
Northrup in Party Girl (1930)

- The Christian (1914)
- Hearts and the Highway (1915)
- My Lady's Slipper (1916)
- Fifty-Fifty (1916)
- The Blue Envelope Mystery (1916)
- The Traveling Salesman (1916)
- The Millionaire's Double (1917)
- The Greatest Power (1917)
- Their Compact (1917)
- The Trail of the Shadow (1917)
- The Beautiful Lie (1917)
- The Voice of Conscience (1917)
- The Eyes of Mystery (1918)
- The Trail to Yesterday (1918)
- Arizona (1918)
- In Judgement Of (1918)
- The Fear Woman (1919)
- Two Women (1919)
- As the Sun Went Down (1919)
- The Way of the Strong (1919)
- The Prince of Avenue A (1920)
- The Luck of the Irish (1920)
- Polly of the Storm Country (1920)
- The Blue Moon (1920)
- The White Circle (1920)
- Wing Toy (1921)
- The Four Horsemen of the Apocalypse (1921)
- Sowing the Wind (1921)
- Flower of the North (1921)
- Jazzmania (1923)
- The Greatest Menace (1923)
- Human Wreckage (1923)
- A Fool's Awakening (1924)
- The Gambling Fool (1925)
- The Unchastened Woman (1925)
- He Who Laughs Last (1925)
- Racing Romance (1926)
- The Heart of Maryland (1927)
- The Shield of Honor (1928)
- Burning Daylight (1928)
- The Divine Sinner (1928)
- The Cheer Leader (1928)
- The Last Warning (1929)
- Men Call It Love (1930)
- The Squaw Man (1931)
