= The Pleasure Buyers =

1925 film

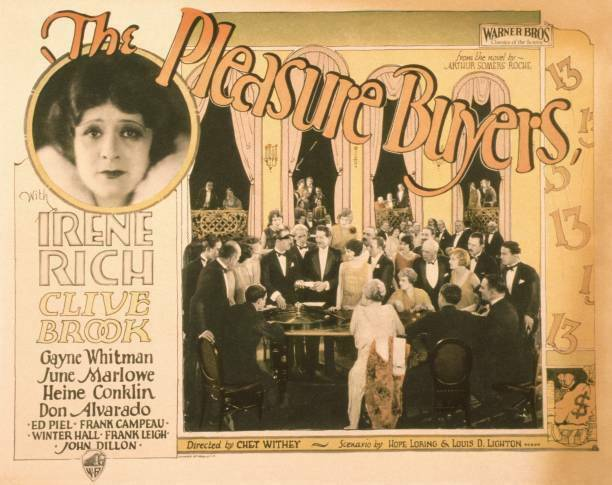
- Lobby card
- Directed by: Chester Withey
- Written by: Louis D. Lighton; Hope Loring
- Based on: The Pleasure Buyers by Arthur Somers Roche
- Starring: Irene Rich; Clive Brook; Gayne Whitman
- Cinematography: Joseph Walker
- Production company: Warner Bros.
- Distributed by: Warner Bros.
- Release date: December 19, 1925
- Running time: 70 minutes
- Country: United States
- Language: Silent (English intertitles)

The Pleasure Buyers is a 1925 American silent mystery drama film directed by Chester Withey and starring Irene Rich, Clive Brook, and Gayne Whitman. It was made by Warner Bros. In 1926 it was released in Britain by Gaumont British Distributors.

== Plot ==
As described in a film magazine review, Gene Cassenas, a careless gambler, is engaged to Helen Ripley. In an effort to save Helen from Gene's fascination, Joan Wiswell arouses his antagonism. After an exciting night here he quarrels with several different persons, Gene is shot fatally while sitting at his Palm Beach home by someone hidden in the dark outside. Former police commissioner Tad Workman is called in to investigate. Six persons are under investigation: a valet, society beauty Joan, her brother Tommy, former business associate Terry, fiancée Helen, and the latter's father. Suspicion regarding the murder falls on Joan because of the argument. After investigation, it is shown that the valet rigged a wall clock to fire a gun at a certain time. With Joan cleared, she and Tad are free to marry.

== Cast ==
- Irene Rich as Joan Wiswell
- Clive Brook as Tad Workman
- Gayne Whitman as Gene Cassenas
- June Marlowe as Helen Ripley
- Chester Conklin as Burke
- Don Alvarado as Tommy Wiswell
- Edward Peil Sr. as Kildare
- Frank Campeau as Quintard
- Winter Hall as General Ripley
- Frank Leigh as Terry

== Preservation status ==
A print of The Pleasure Buyers is held at the Museum of Modern Art in New York City.

== Bibliography ==
- Goble, Alan. The Complete Index to Literary Sources in Film. Walter de Gruyter, 1999.
