= Elita Proctor Otis =

American actress

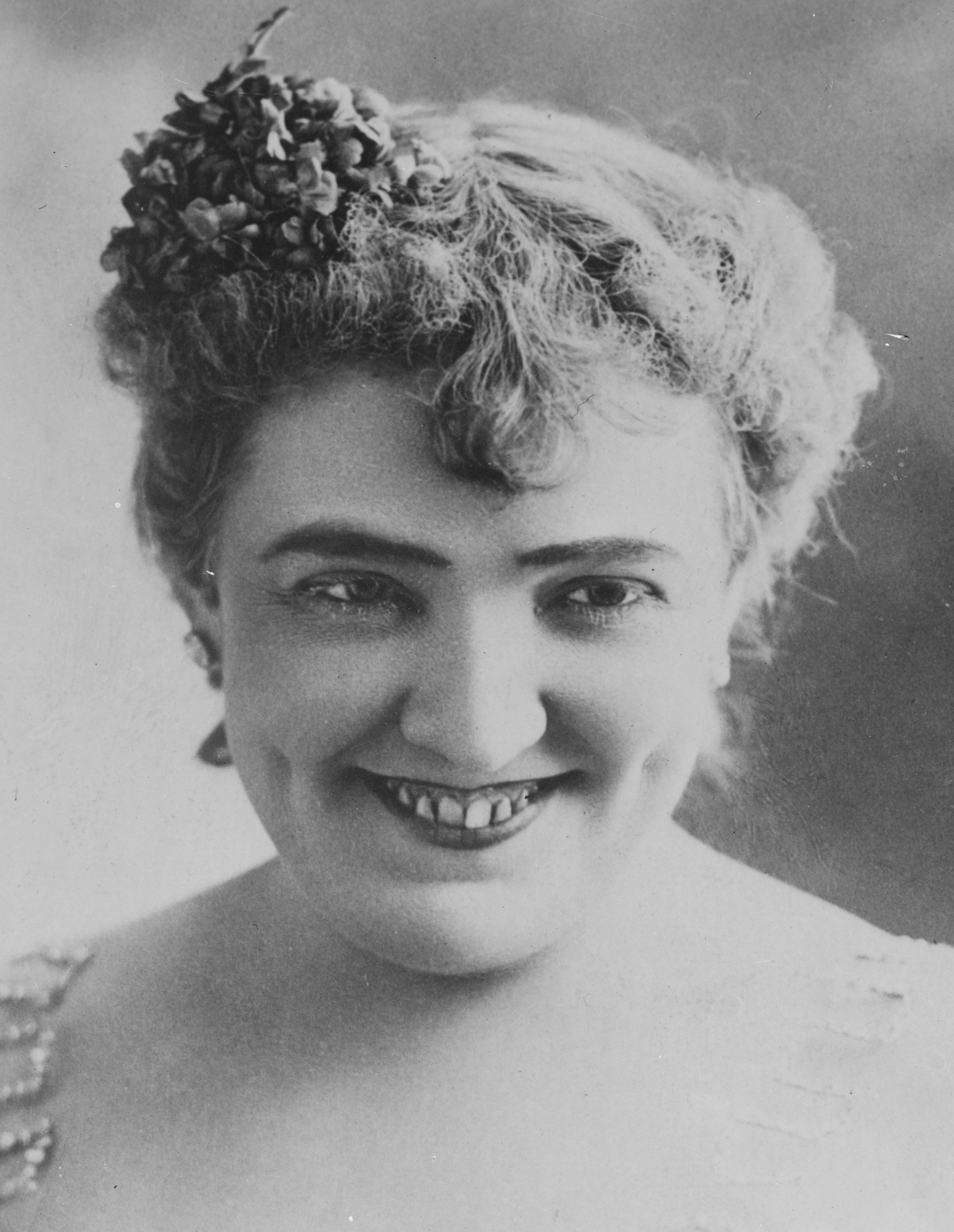
- portrait of Proctor Otis
- Born: 1860; Cleveland, Ohio, U.S.
- Died: August 10, 1927 (aged 66–67); Pelham, New York, U.S.
- Occupation: Actress
- Years active: 1909–1926
- Spouse: William C. Camp
- Relatives: Redfield Proctor (great-uncle)

Elita Proctor Otis (1851 or 1860 – August 10, 1927) was an American actress. She had a long distinguished stage career before her foray into early silent films. In 1909, she may have been the first actress to play Nancy Sikes on screen in a Vitagraph produced version of Oliver Twist.

== Early years and career ==
She was born around 1860 in Cleveland, Ohio. Her father, William Henry Otis, was a banker. Redfield Proctor, who was a senator from Vermont, was her great-uncle.

Otis's stage debut came with the Kemble Dramatic Society. She made her professional debut as Ernestine Echo in Crust of Society at the Globe Theatre in Boston.

Broadway plays in which Otis performed included The House of Bondage (1914), Potash and Perlmutter (1913), Are You a Crook? (1913), The Purple Road (1913), The Greyhound (1912), The Three Romeos (1911), The Girl from Rector's (1909), Mary's Lamb (1908), Society and the Bulldog (1908), The Little Michus (1907), About Town (1906), The Two Orphans (1904), In the Midst of Life (1902), The Brixton Burglary (1901), Quo Vadis (1900), Woman and Wine (1900), and A Ward of France (1897).

== Later years and death ==
Otis was married to William C. Camp.

For the last 12 years of her life she was an invalid. She died on August 10, 1927, in Pelham, New York. Her funeral was held at the Church of the Transfiguration on August 17, 1927, and she was buried in Woodlawn Cemetery.

== Filmography ==
- Adventures of a Drummer Boy (1909) (credited as Elita Otis)
- Oliver Twist (1909) as Nancy Sykes
- Les Misérables (Part I) (1909) aka The Galley Slave
- A Midsummer Night's Dream (1909) as Hippolyta
- The Great Diamond Robbery (1914) as Mother Rosenbaum
- The Greyhound (1914) as 'Deep Sea Kitty' Doyle
- The Triflers (1920) (as Olita Otis) as. Effie Stilwell
- Under Northern Lights (1920) (credited as Oleta Ottis) as Madge Carson
- The Torrent (1921) (credited as Oleta Ottis) as Anne Mayhew
- While the Devil Laughs (1921) (credited as Oleta Ottis) as Pearl De La Marr
- The Secret of the Hills (1921) (credited as Oleta Otis) as Mrs. Miltimore
- The Infidel (1922) (credited as Oleta Otis) as Miss Parliss
- Refuge (1923) (credited as Olita Otis) as The Princess
- Miss Nobody (1926) (credited as Oleta Otis) as Miriam Arnold
- The Lost Express (1926) as Mrs. Arthur Standish
