= A Florida Enchantment =

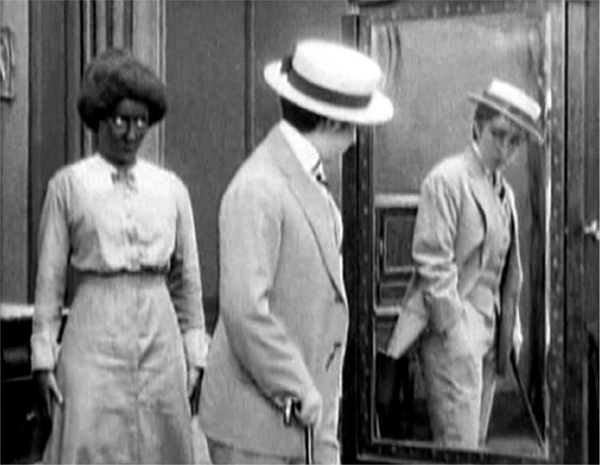
- Edith Storey as Lillian Travers/Lawrence Talbot (right) and Ethel Lloyd as Jane, "Miss Travers' mulatto maid" (left)
- Directed by: Sidney Drew
- Written by: Marguerite Bertsch; Eugene Mullin
- Starring: Edith Storey; Sidney Drew; Ethel Lloyd
- Cinematography: Robert A. Stuart
- Production companies: Vitagraph Company of America; Broadway Star Features
- Distributed by: General Film Co.
- Release date: August 10, 1914
- Running time: 5 reels, approx. 63 minutes
- Country: United States
- Language: Silent (English intertitles)

A Florida Enchantment (1914) is a silent film directed by Sidney Drew and released by the Vitagraph studio. The feature-length comedy/fantasy was shot in and around St. Augustine, Florida, where its story is set. It is notable for its cross-dressing lead characters, much later discussed as bisexual, gay and transgender.

Full film

== Plot ==
In the film, Lillian Travers, a wealthy Northern woman about to be married, visits her aunt in Florida. While there, she stops in a curiosity shop and buys a small casket which contains a note and a vial of seeds. At her aunt's house she reads the note which explains that the seeds change men into women and vice versa. Angry with her fiancé, Fred, Lillian decides to test the effects of the seeds. The next morning, Lillian discovers that she has transformed into a man. Lillian's transformation into Lawrence Talbot has also sometimes been read as a transformation into a butch gay woman. This reading is bolstered by the later transformation of Lillian's fiancé into what could be an effeminate gay man. However, as Lillian and her fiancé are shown attracted both to each other and to the same sex (albeit at different times), the film has also been considered to have the first documented appearance of bisexual characters in an American motion picture.

== Cast ==
- Edith Storey - Lillian Travers/Lawrence Talbot
- Sidney Drew - Dr. Frederick Cassadene
- Ethel Lloyd - Jane
- Grace Stevens - Constancia Oglethorpe
- Charles Kent - Major Horton
- Jane Morrow (screen name for Lucille McVey, aka Mrs. Sidney Drew) - Bessie Horton
- Ada Gifford - Stella Lovejoy
- Lillian Burns - Malvina
- Allan Campbell - Stockton Remington
- Cortland van Deusen - Charley Wilkes
- Frank O'Neil - Gustavus Duncan

== Production background ==
The film is based on the 1891 novel and 1896 play (now lost) of the same name written by Fergus Redmond and Archibald Clavering Gunter. The film, produced by Vitagraph Films, was shot in 1914 on location in three Florida locations: Jacksonville,. St. Augustine, and St. Petersburg.

The film includes white actors in blackface, an aspect carefully dissected in Siobhan B. Somerville's book Queering the Color Line: Race and the Invention of Homosexuality in American Culture. Since its inclusion in Vito Russo's 1981 book The Celluloid Closet: Homosexuality in the Movies and its 1995 documentary film adaptation, A Florida Enchantment has been seen as one of the earliest screen representations of homosexuality and cross-dressing in American culture. Alison McMahan, a screenwriter and filmmaker, argued that the film was "influenced by the Solax approach to crossdressing, transbodiment, and role revesal."

== Reception and analysis ==
At the time of its release, Variety stated that the film should have "never been put out", and the New York Clipper criticized the film and said the female and male impersonations at the story's center were "a most disagreeable theme". When the stage version of the original novel was on Broadway, in 1896, the New York Times described it as "vile stuff" and "nauseating". Variety was also critical of the stage version for similar reasons.

In a masters thesis for University of Florida, Joel Christian Adams analyzed the film, arguing it is transformed from the original novel, noting the connection to consumer capitalism at the time, argued it has become an "ur-text within the emergent history of lesbian and gay visibility", and said the transformations of the film's characters come within a "seemingly fixed system of gender and racial assignment." Scholar Janet Staiger said the film is an "extensive treatment" of cross-dressing and gender-switching, arguing it is interesting because it does not only make cross-dressing a performance, but it creates a narrative around gender transformation and creates "narrative tension". Film historian David Kalat added that the film might be the first "feature comedy", criticized the film's racial stereotypes, but noted it is about the "slipperiness of identity".

Historian Julio Capó Jr. also argued that the film introduced viewers to "gender and sexual transgression" which were possible in the cities and resort towns of Florida, including dances reminiscent of those in Chicago and New York City, and stated that "cultural understandings of race" influenced the message communicated by the film. He also distinguished between the vaudeville show of the same name, premiering three years earlier, and the film. Susan Potter, a films studies scholar, stated the film has an affinity for a "novel stylistic transformation" in which a character engages in action to "guarantee legibility", along with creation of new personification and sexual legibility. Others were more critical. Maggie Hennneield, a scholar of early cinema, argued that the film was "bread-and-butter" for the film industry, which she said "often exploited nonnormative bodies" to resolve tensions between commercial appeals of film and its "aspirational artistic ambitions". She also stated the film missed the mark of "codified deviance or sexual subversion" present in previous adaptations of the original novel.

== In popular culture ==
The film is a central element of the 2020 novel Antkind by Charlie Kaufman.

== See also ==
- Florida tourism industry
