= Moon Madness (1920 film) =

1920 film by Colin Campbell

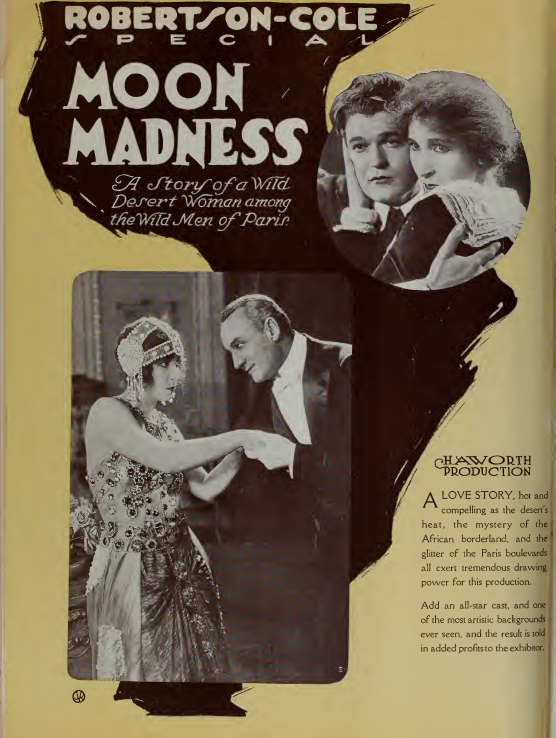
- Advertisement
- Directed by: Colin Campbell
- Written by: J. Grubb Alexander
- Starring: Edith Storey; Sam De Grasse; Josef Swickard
- Cinematography: Fred Schoedsack
- Production company: Haworth Studios
- Distributed by: Robertson-Cole Distributing Corporation
- Release date: July 1920
- Running time: 6 reels
- Country: United States
- Language: Silent (English intertitles)

Moon Madness is a lost 1920 American silent drama film directed by Colin Campbell and starring Edith Storey, Sam De Grasse, and Josef Swickard.

== Cast ==
- Edith Storey as Valerie / Zora
- Sam De Grasse as Adrien
- Josef Swickard as Latour
- Wallace MacDonald as Jan
- Irene Hunt as Badoura
- William Courtleigh as Raoul
- Frankie Lee as The Child
- Fred Starr as Arab Chief

== Bibliography ==
- Donald W. McCaffrey & Christopher P. Jacobs. Guide to the Silent Years of American Cinema. Greenwood Publishing, 1999. ISBN 0-313-30345-2
