= Oliver Twist (1909 film) =

1909 film directed by J. Stuart Blackton

- Directed by: J. Stuart Blackton
- Written by: Charles Dickens; Eugene Mullin
- Based on: Oliver Twist; 1837 novel by Charles Dickens
- Produced by: J. Stuart Blackton
- Starring: Edith Storey
- Release date: May 1, 1909
- Country: United States
- Languages: Silent film English intertitles

Oliver Twist is a 1909 American film and the first film adaptation of Charles Dickens' 1838 novel Oliver Twist. It starred Edith Storey as Oliver Twist, Elita Proctor Otis as Nancy, and William J. Humphrey as Fagin. It was directed by J. Stuart Blackton.

The film was made by Vitagraph Studios and marketed with emphasis on the participation of Elita Proctor Otis, who was said to have made the role of Nancy "famous throughout the world".

== Cast ==
- Edith Storey - Oliver
- William Humphrey - Fagin
- Elita Proctor Otis - Nancy Sykes
