= May Hopkins =

American politician

- Born: May Belinda Lowell; August 31, 1870; Amboy Township, Ohio, U.S.
- Died: February 6, 1949 (age 78); California, U.S.
- Occupations: Politician, clubwoman
- Known for: Mayor of Redondo Beach, California (1928–1931)

May Belinda Lowell Hopkins (August 31, 1870 – February 6, 1949) was an American politician, businesswoman, and clubwoman. She was the mayor of Redondo Beach, California, from 1928 until she was recalled early in 1931.

== Early life ==
Hopkins was born in Amboy Township, Ohio, the daughter of John Butler Lowell and Helen M. Kennedy Lowell.

== Career ==
Hopkins was a licensed real estate broker, a charter member of the Redondo Woman's Club, and founder and president of the Redondo Beach chapter of the Business and Professional Women's Club. She was Redondo Beach's city treasurer for twelve years, and president of the city's school board, before she became mayor of Redondo Beach in 1928. As mayor she welcomed California State Fraternal Congress when they held their annual picnic in Redondo Beach in 1930.

Hopkins was recalled and replaced by the city council in 1931, but remained active in local civic life through the 1930s and into the 1940s. Her son Albert Lowell Hopkins was chief of police in Redondo Beach.

== Personal life ==
Lowell married printer Albert Roscoe Hopkins in 1893. They had two children, and separated by 1920. She died in 1949, at the age of 78, at her home on Redondo Beach, "after a long life of useful service to her community, friends and associates".
