= 1908 in film =

The year 1908 in film involved some significant events.

== Events ==
- July 3 - Malhabour Theater, the first film house in Iloilo City was opened to the public.
- July 14 – D. W. Griffith becomes a director at the American Mutoscope and Biograph Company in New York City. Between 1908 and 1913, Griffith will direct nearly 500 films starting with the release of The Adventures of Dollie.
- October 28 – The Russian Film Industry begins with the release of Russia's first fictional narrative film Stenka Razin.
- November 18 – Release in France of The Assassination of the Duke of Guise (La Mort du duc de Guise), the first film with a screenplay by an eminent man of letters, the playwright Henri Lavedan; it is also directed by two men of the theatre, Charles Le Bargy and André Calmettes, features actors of the Comédie-Française, and is accompanied by a score from Saint-Saëns.
- December - Thomas Edison forms the Motion Picture Patents Company, with goals of controlling production and distribution, raising theater admission prices, cooperating with censorship bodies, and preventing film stock from getting into the hands of nonmember producers.
- Pathé invents the newsreel that was shown in cinemas prior to a feature film.

== Notable films ==
=== A ===
- The Adventures of Dollie, directed by D. W. Griffith – (US)
- After Many Years, directed by D. W. Griffith, based on the 1864 narrative poem Enoch Arden by Alfred, Lord Tennyson – (US)
- Antony and Cleopatra, directed by J. Stuart Blackton and Charles Kent, based on the 17th-century play by William Shakespeare – (US)
- L'Arlésienne (The Girl from Arles), directed by Albert Capellani, based on the 1869 short story by Alphonse Daudet – (France)
- The Assassination of the Duke of Guise (L'Assassinat du duc de Guise), directed by Charles le Bargy and André Calmettes – (France)

=== B ===
- Beauty and the Beast (La Belle et la Bêtte) (Incomplete), directed by Albert Capellani, based on the 1740 fairy tale by Gabrielle-Suzanne Barbot de Villeneuve – (France)
- The Beauty of the Sleeping Wood (La Belle au bois dormant), directed by Albert Capellani and Lucien Nonguet, based on the 1697 fairy tale Sleeping Beauty by Charles Perrault – (France)
- Betrayed by a Handprint, directed by D. W. Griffith – (US)

=== C ===
- The Call of the Wild, directed by D. W. Griffith – (US)
- A Christmas Carol (lost), produced by Essanay Film Manufacturing Company, based on the 1843 novella by Charles Dickens – (US)
- Cupid's Pranks, directed by Edwin S. Porter – (US)

=== D ===
- The Devil, directed by D. W. Griffith – (US)
- The Dog and His Various Merits (Le Chien et ses services), produced by Pathé Frères – (France)
- Don Juan Tenorio, directed by Ricardo de Baños and Alberto Marro – (Spain)
- Dr. Jekyll and Mr. Hyde (lost), produced by William N. Selig, based on the 1886 novella Strange Case of Dr Jekyll and Mr Hyde by Robert Louis Stevenson – (US)
- The Dream of an Opium Fiend (Le Rêve d'un fumeur d'opium), directed by Georges Méliès – (France)
- Dream of Toyland, directed by Arthur Melbourne-Cooper – (UK)

=== E ===
- Excursion to the Moon (Excursion dans la lune), directed by Segundo de Chomón – (France)

=== F ===
- The Fairylogue and Radio-Plays (lost), directed by Francis Boggs and Otis Turner, based on the Oz books by L. Frank Baum – (US)
- Fantasmagorie, directed by Émile Cohl, the first animated cartoon – (France)
- Fun with the Bridal Party (Le Mariage de Thomas Poirot) (lost), directed by Georges Méliès – (France)

=== I ===
- Incident from Don Quixote (La Toile d'araignée merveilleuse) (lost), directed by Georges Méliès – (France)

=== L ===
- Legend of a Ghost (La Légende du fantôme), directed by Segundo de Chomón – (France)
- Long Distance Wireless Photography (La Photographie électrique à distance), directed by Georges Méliès – (France)

=== M ===
- Macbeth (lost), directed by J. Stuart Blackton, based on the 17th-century play by William Shakespeare – (US)
- Magic Bricks, directed by Segundo de Chomón – (France)
- The Magic Mirror (Le Miroir Magique), directed by Segundo de Chomón – (France)
- The Man and His Bottle, directed by Lewin Fitzhamon – (UK)

=== N ===
- The New Lord of the Village (Le Nouveau Seigneur du village), directed by Georges Méliès – (France)

=== O ===
- Over the Hill to the Poorhouse, directed by Stanner E.V. Taylor – (US)

=== P ===
- Pharmaceutical Hallucinations (Hallucinations pharmaceutiques ou le Truc du potard), directed by Georges Méliès – (France)
- The Physician of the Castle (Le Médecin du château), produced by Pathé Frères – (France)
- The Puppet's Nightmare (Le Cauchemar de Fantoche), directed by Émile Cohl – (France)

=== R ===
- The Reprieve: An Episode in the Life of Abraham Lincoln, directed by Van Dyke Brooke – (US)
- Rescued from an Eagle's Nest, directed by J. Searle Dawley, starring D. W. Griffith – (US)
- Romeo and Juliet, directed by J. Stuart Blackton, based on the 16th-century play by William Shakespeare – (US)
- The Runaway Horse (Le Cheval emballé), directed by Louis J. Gasnier – (France)

=== S ===
- Stenka Razin, directed by Vladimir Romashkov – (Russia)

=== T ===
- The Taming of the Shrew, directed by D. W. Griffith, based on the 16th-century play by William Shakespeare – (US)
- The Tempest, directed by Percy Stow, based on the 17th-century play by William Shakespeare – (UK)
- The Thieving Hand, possibly directed by J. Stuart Blackton – (US)
- Troubles of a Grass Widower (Vive la vie de garçon), directed by and starring Max Linder – (France)

=== V ===
- A Very Fine Lady (Une dame vraiment bien), directed by Louis Feuillade and Romeo Bosetti – (France)

=== W ===
- Whaling Afloat and Ashore, directed by Robert W. Paul – (UK)

== Births ==
- January 8 – William Hartnell, English actor (died 1975)
- January 10
  - Paul Henreid, Austrian-American actor, director, producer, and writer (died 1992)
  - Bernard Lee, English actor (died 1981)
- January 11 – Lionel Stander, American actor, activist, and a founding member of the Screen Actors Guild (died 1994)
- January 12 – Jean Delannoy, French actor, film editor, screenwriter and film director (died 2008)
- January 16 – Ethel Merman, American singer and actress (died 1984)
- January 25 – Howard Wendell, American actor (died 1975)
- January 26 – Dennis Moore, American actor (died 1964)
- February 5 – Peg Entwistle, British actress (died 1932)
- February 6 – Russell Gleason, American actor (died 1945)
- February 7 – Buster Crabbe, American two-time Olympic swimmer and actor (died 1983)
- February 11 – Philip Dunne, American screenwriter, film director, and producer (died 1992)
- February 15 – William Janney, American actor (died 1992)
- February 22 – John Mills, English actor (died 2005)
- February 26 – Tex Avery, American animator and voice actor (died 1980)
- March 5 – Rex Harrison, English actor (died 1990)
- March 7 – Anna Magnani, Italian actress (died 1973)
- March 20 – Michael Redgrave, English actor and filmmaker (died 1985)
- March 25 – Phillip Reed, American actor (died 1996)
- March 29
  - Arthur O'Connell, American actor (died 1981)
  - Dennis O'Keefe, American actor (died 1968)
- April 2 – Buddy Ebsen, American actor and dancer (died 2003)
- April 5 – Bette Davis, American actress (died 1989)
- April 15 – Lita Grey, American actress (died 1995)
- April 19 – Irena Eichlerówna, Polish actress (died 1990)
- April 24 – Marceline Day, American actress (died 2000)
- April 30 – Eve Arden, American actress (died 1990)
- May 2 – William Bakewell, American actor (died 1993)
- May 7 – Valentine Dyall, English character actor (died 1985)
- May 20 – James Stewart, American actor and military aviator (died 1997)
- May 25 – Barbara Luddy, American actress (died 1979)
- May 26 – Robert Morley, English actor (died 1992)
- May 27 – Lita Chevret, American actress (died 2001)
- May 30 – Mel Blanc, American voice actor and radio personality (died 1989)
- May 31 – Don Ameche, American actor, comedian and vaudevillian (died 1993)
- June 3 – Eddie Acuff, American actor (died 1956)
- June 10 – Russell Waters, Scottish actor (died 1982)
- June 17 – Frank Sully, American actor (died 1975)
- July 1 – Raúl de Anda, Mexican actor, screenwriter, film producer and director (died 1937)
- July 12 – Milton Berle, American actor and comedian (died 2002)
- July 15 – Howard Vernon, Swiss actor and photographer (died 1996)
- July 17 – Enzo Fiermonte, Italian actor and boxer (died 1993)
- July 18 – Lupe Vélez, Mexican actress, singer, and dancer (died 1944)
- July 23 – Karl Swenson, American actor (died 1978)
- August 6 – Will Lee, American actor (died 1982)
- August 13 – Gene Raymond, American actor (died 1998)
- August 19 – Barry Kelley, American actor (died 1991)
- August 30
  - David Clarke, American actor (died 2004)
  - Fred MacMurray, American actor (died 1991)
- September 13 – Mae Questel, American actress (died 1998)
- September 15 – Penny Singleton, American actress and labor leader (died 2003)
- October 5 – Joshua Logan, American film director, playwright and screenwriter (died 1988)
- October 6 – Carole Lombard, American actress (died 1942)
- October 22 – John Sutton, British actor (died 1963)
- October 25
  - Tauno Palo, Finnish actor and singer (died 1982)
  - Polly Ann Young, American actress (died 1997)
- November 2 – Reginald Beckwith, English actor (died 1965)
- November 4 – Anthony Warde, American actor (died 1975)
- December 2 – Robert F. Simon, American character actor (died 1992)
- December 3
  - Robert Kent, American actor (died 1955)
  - Anna Sten, Ukrainian-American actress (died 1993)
- December 11
  - Manoel de Oliveira, Portuguese film director and screenwriter (died 2015)
  - Sally Eilers, American actress (died 1978)
- December 13 – Van Heflin, American theatre, radio and actor (died 1971)
- December 14 – Laurence Naismith, English actor (died 1992)
- December 18 – Celia Johnson, English actress (died 1982)
- December 20 – Dennis Morgan, American actor and singer (died 1994)
- December 25 – Quentin Crisp, English raconteur (died 1999)
- December 28 – Lew Ayres, American actor (died 1996)

== Deaths ==
- May 23 – Peter F. Dailey, actor, singer (born 1868)

== Film debuts ==
- Hobart Bosworth – "The Count of Monte Cristo" (short
- Sidney Drew – "Cupid's Realm or A Game of Hearts" (short)
- Julia Swayne Gordon – "Othello" (short)
- D.W. Griffith – actor/writer: "When Knighthood was in Flower" (short); producer: "Deceived Slumming Party" (short); director: "The Adventures of Dollie" (short)
- Marion Leonard – "At the Crossroads of Life" (short)
- Owen Moore – "The Guerilla" (short)
- Miriam Nesbitt – "Saved by Love"
- Mack Sennett – "Old Isaacs, the Pawnbroker" (short)
- Earle Williams – "Barbara Fritchie: The Story of a Patriotic Woman" (short)
- Kathlyn Williams – "On Thanksgiving Day" (short)
