= Money Mad (1908 film) =

1908 film by D. W. Griffith

- Directed by: D. W. Griffith
- Written by: D. W. Griffith
- Starring: Charles Inslee
- Cinematography: G. W. Bitzer
- Release date: December 4, 1908
- Running time: 11 minutes (16 frame/s)
- Country: United States
- Languages: Silent; English intertitles

Play film; runtime 00:08:57.

Money Mad is a 1908 American short crime film directed by D. W. Griffith. It is based on the short story "Just Meat" by Jack London.

== Cast ==
- Charles Inslee - The Miser
- George Gebhardt - Second Villain
- Arthur V. Johnson - Bank Clerk
- Florence Lawrence - Bank Customer / Landlady
- Jeanie MacPherson - Bank Customer
- Mack Sennett - Man on the Street
- Harry Solter - First Villain

== See also ==
- List of American films of 1908
- 1908 in film
