= List of American films of 1908 =

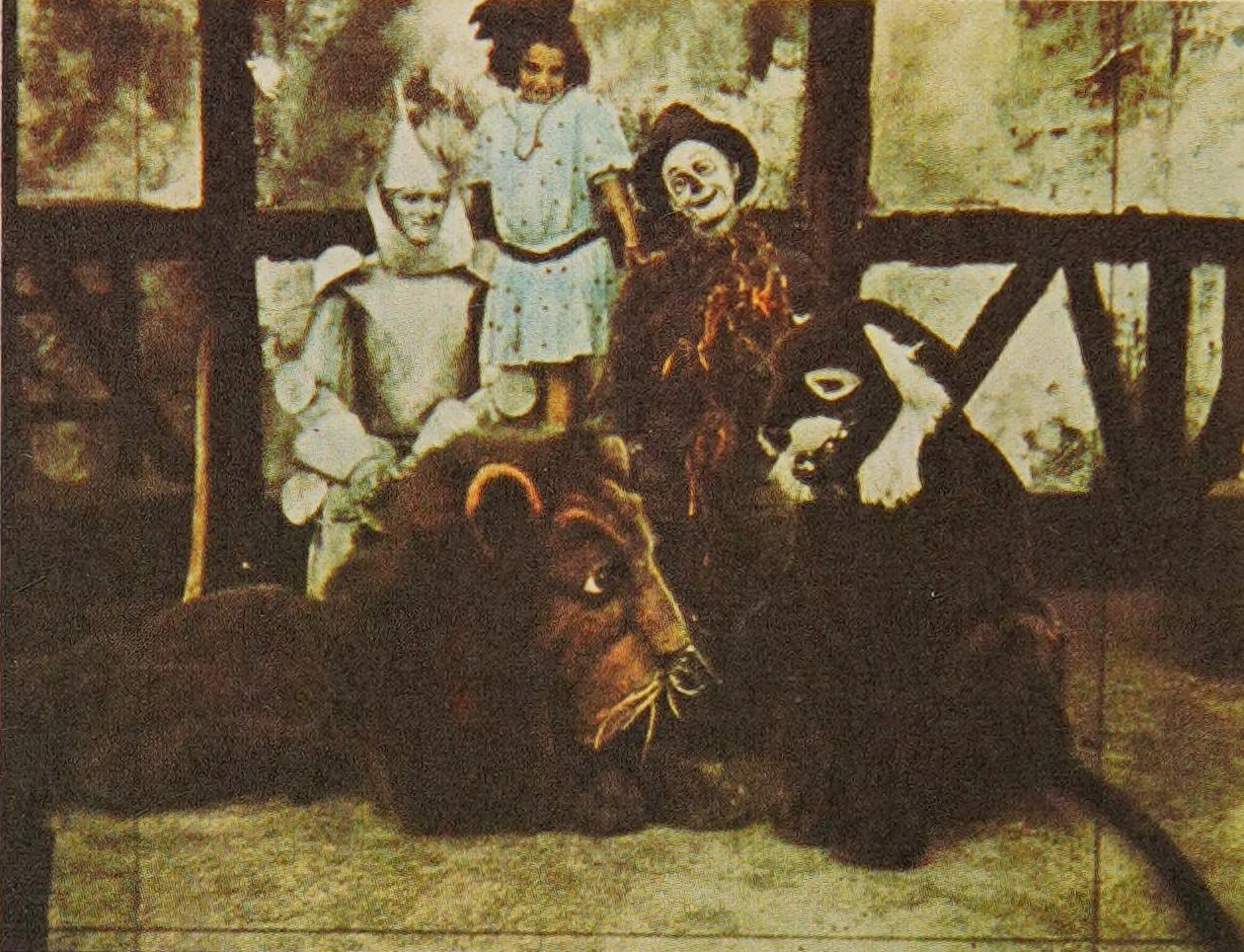
The Fairylogue and Radio-Plays

More than 675 American films were released in 1908. Most were productions from Biograph, Edison, Essanay, Kalem, Lubin, Selig and Vitagraph Studios.

Title	Director	Cast	Genre	Notes
The Adventures of Dollie	D. W. Griffith	Arthur V. Johnson, Linda Arvidson	Drama	Griffith's first film
Antony and Cleopatra	J. Stuart Blackton	Florence Lawrence, William V. Ranous	Shakespeare	
Balked at the Altar	D. W. Griffith	Linda Arvidson, George Gebhardt	Comedy	
The Bandit's Waterloo	D. W. Griffith	Charles Inslee, Linda Arvidson	Drama	
The Black Viper	D. W. Griffith	D. W. Griffith	Drama	
A Calamitous Elopement	D. W. Griffith	Harry Solter, Linda Arvidson	Comedy	
The Call of the Wild	D. W. Griffith	Charles Inslee	Adventure	
A Christmas Carol		Tom Ricketts	Drama	
Deceived Slumming Party	D. W. Griffith	Edward Dillon, D. W. Griffith, George Gebhardt	Comedy	
Dr. Jekyll and Mr. Hyde	Otis Turner	Hobart Bosworth, Betty Harte	Horror	Lost film
The Fairylogue and Radio-Plays	Francis Boggs; Otis Turner		Fantasy	Lost film
The Fight for Freedom	D. W. Griffith	Florence Auer, John G. Adolfi	Western	
Macbeth	J. Stuart Blackton	William V. Ranous, Paul Panzer	Shakespeare	
Money Mad	D. W. Griffith	Charles Inslee, George Gebhardt	Crime	
The Red Man and the Child	D. W. Griffith	Charles Inslee, John Tansey	Western	
Romeo and Juliet	J. Stuart Blackton	Paul Panzer, Florence Lawrence	Shakespeare	
The Taming of the Shrew	D. W. Griffith	Florence Lawrence, Arthur V. Johnson	Shakespeare	
The Tavern Keeper's Daughter	D. W. Griffith	George Gebhardt, Florence Auer	Action	

== See also ==
- 1908 in the United States
