= Balked at the Altar =

1908 film directed by D. W. Griffith

- Directed by: D. W. Griffith
- Written by: D. W. Griffith
- Starring: Mabel Stoughton
- Cinematography: Arthur Marvin
- Production company: Biograph Company
- Release date: August 25, 1908
- Running time: 11–12 minutes (16 frame/s; original film length 703 feet)
- Country: United States
- Language: Silent with English intertitles

Play film; runtime 00:09:25.

Balked at the Altar is a 1908 American silent short comedy film directed by D. W. Griffith. A print of the film survives in the film archive of the Library of Congress. The film was made by the American Mutoscope and Biograph Company when it along with many other early film studios in America's first motion picture industry were based in Fort Lee, New Jersey, at the beginning of the 20th century.

== Cast ==
- Mabel Stoughton as Female Lead
- Linda Arvidson
- George Gebhardt
- D. W. Griffith
- Robert Harron
- Arthur V. Johnson
- Mack Sennett
- Harry Solter

== See also ==
- List of American films of 1908
- 1908 in film
- D. W. Griffith filmography
