= The Black Viper =

- Play film; runtime 00:10:02.
- Directed by: D. W. Griffith; Wallace McCutcheon
- Produced by: American Mutoscope and Biograph Company
- Starring: D. W. Griffith; Mack Sennett; Anthony O'Sullivan
- Release date: July 25, 1908
- Running time: Originally 10-11 minutes (1 reel, 724 feet)
- Country: United States
- Languages: Silent; English intertitles

The Black Viper (aka La vipère noire in France) is a 1908 film directed by D. W. Griffith. The film was made by the American Mutoscope and Biograph Company which was based in Fort Lee, New Jersey, at the beginning of the 20th century.

== Plot ==
A thug accosts a girl as she leaves her workplace but a man rescues her. The thug vows revenge and, with the help of two friends, attacks the girl and her rescuer again as they're going for a walk. This time they succeed in kidnapping the rescuer. He is bound and gagged and taken away in a cart. The girl runs home and gets help from several neighbors. They track the ruffians down to a cabin in the mountains where the gang has trapped their victim and set the cabin on fire. A thug and Rescuer fight on the roof of the house.

== Cast ==
- Edward Dillon as Mike
- George Gebhardt as Viper
- Mack Sennett as Rescuer
- D. W. Griffith as Rescuer
- Anthony O'Sullivan as Gang Member

== See also ==
- D. W. Griffith filmography
- List of American films of 1908
