= Inez Ranous =

American actress

- Born: Inez Marcel; June 22, 1885; Ohio, USA
- Died: Unknown
- Occupation: Actress
- Spouse: William V. Ranous (1912–1915)

Inez Ranous (born Inez Marcel) was an American actress of the stage and screen who was active during Hollywood's silent era. She was married for a time to pioneering actor/director William V. Ranous of Vitagraph.

== Biography ==
Inez began acting at a young age, appearing first in plays and later in films. She often did her own stunts, and broke her ankle while jumping from a window on set. She married W.V. Ranous in New York City in 1912. Her husband died at their home in Santa Monica in 1915, and she continued to work through the end of the decade. Little is known of her life afterward. She was friends with actress Florence Lawrence.

== Selected filmography ==
- The Burning Question (1919)
- A Gay Old Dog (1919)
- The Transgressor (1918)
- Appearance of Evil (1918)
- The Power and the Glory (1918)
- The Victim (1917)
- Unknown 274 (1917)
- The Small Town Girl (1917)
- The Mischief Maker (1916)
- Two Seats at the Opera (1916)
- The Little Grey Mouse (1916)
- Behind the Veil (1916)
- A College Boomerang (1916)
- Cinderella (1914)
- Counterfeiters (1914)
- The Honor of the Humble (1914)
- Her Ragged Knight (1914)
