= The Adventures of Dollie =

1908 film by D. W. Griffith

- Play full film; runtime 00:12:49
- Directed by: D. W. Griffith
- Written by: Stanner E.V. Taylor
- Starring: Arthur V. Johnson; Linda Arvidson; Gladys Egan; Charles Inslee; Madeline West
- Cinematography: Arthur Marvin
- Distributed by: American Mutoscope and Biograph Company
- Release date: July 14, 1908
- Running time: 12 minutes
- Country: United States
- Language: Silent (English intertitles)

The Adventures of Dollie is a 1908 American silent drama film directed by D. W. Griffith in his directorial debut. A print of the film survives in the Library of Congress film archive. The story follows a young girl who is kidnapped by a peddler and sealed inside a barrel that floats down a river toward a waterfall.

== Plot ==
On a summer day, a father and mother take their daughter Dollie on an outing by the river. A passing peddler attempts to sell them goods, but the mother refuses. The peddler tries to rob her, but the father intervenes and drives him away. The peddler returns to his camp and devises a plan with his female companion. While the parents are distracted, they kidnap Dollie and take her back to their camp.

The kidnappers gag Dollie, place her inside a wooden barrel, and seal it shut before the rescue party arrives. After the searchers leave, the peddler and his companion flee in a wagon, but the barrel accidentally falls into the river. Carried by the current, the barrel floats downstream toward a waterfall. A boy fishing along the riverbank sees the barrel and alerts Dollie's father, who retrieves it and frees his daughter. The film ends with their emotional reunion.

== Cast ==
- Arthur V. Johnson as Father
- Linda Arvidson as Mother
- Gladys Egan as Dollie
- Charles Inslee as Gypsy
- Madeline West as Gypsy's wife

== Production ==
The Biograph Company sought an additional director as it prepared to expand its output to two films per week. D. W. Griffith, then employed as a writer, was asked to direct The Adventures of Dollie. Linda Arvidson, who played Dollie's mother, was Griffith's wife, although their marriage was kept secret from the studio.

== See also ==
- List of American films of 1908
- 1908 in film
- D. W. Griffith filmography
