= The Bride of Lammermoor (1909 film) =

Lost silent film

The Bride of Lammermoor, A Tragedy of Bonnie Scotland (1909)
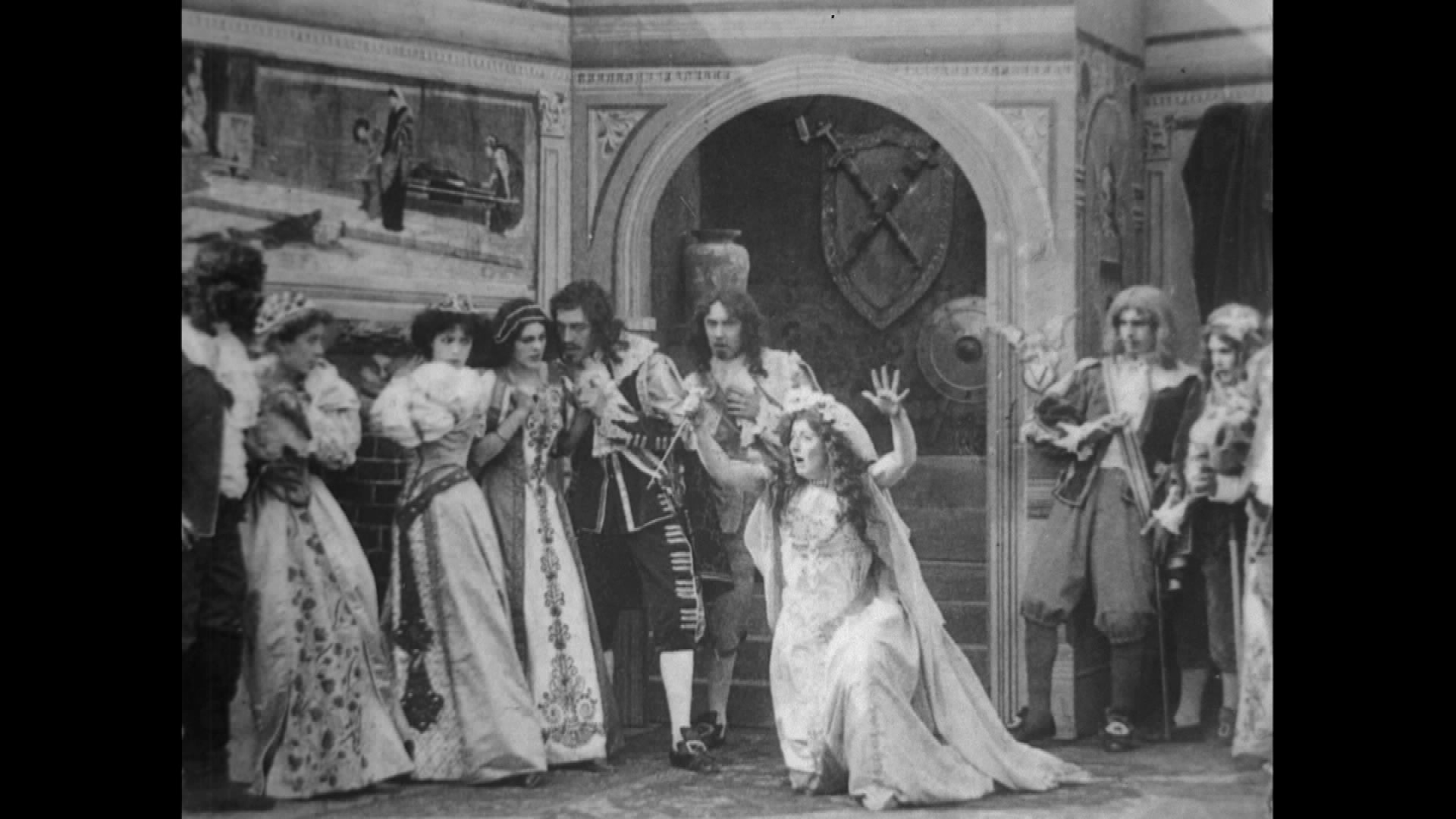
- Annette Kellerman in a scene from the film
- Directed by: J. Stuart Blackton
- Written by: Theodore A. Liebler Jr.
- Based on: The Bride of Lammermoor by Walter Scott
- Produced by: Daniel Frohman
- Starring: Annette Kellerman; Maurice Costello
- Production company: Vitagraph Studios
- Distributed by: Vitagraph Studios
- Release date: January 5, 1909
- Running time: 7 minutes (540 feet)
- Country: United States
- Language: Silent (English intertitles)

The Bride of Lammermoor is a 1909 American silent drama film directed by J. Stuart Blackton for Vitagraph Studios. Existing in fragmentary form, it is considered to be a lost film.

== Cast ==
- Annette Kellerman as Lucy Ashton
- Maurice Costello as Edgar Ravenswood

== Plot ==
Based on the novel by Walter Scott, it tells the story of two ill-fated lovers and the tragedy that follows their thwarted union.

== Production ==
The Bride of Lammermoor was produced by Vitagraph Studios and released January 5, 1909. The copyright date is listed as 19 December 1908.

== Reception ==
A review from The Moving Picture World on 9 Jan 1909 writes, "An excellent production of Scott’s well known novel of that name. The Vitagraph people have given another of their ambitious films which is as satisfactory as it is possible to make such a long story in so condensed a form. The staging is as near correct as can be made now, and the acting is especially good. The scene where the heroine goes mad is strong and appears natural in the last degree. This film is extremely popular with the audience, and brought a round of applause in two different places where it was seen this week.” Another review from The Moving Picture World calls it "a very excellent effort", but took issue with the liberty taken with Scott's source material, writing, "Just a word to the producer, who takes a liberty with Scott's text by making Edgar commit suicide and die, a ghastly object, at the foot of sea-swept rocks. That is just exactly what he did not do in the book."

== Preservation status ==
This is presumed a lost film.
