= List of film directors who studied under D. W. Griffith =

Pioneer American film director D. W. Griffith (1875–1948) enjoyed a wide sphere of influence among his colleagues, including several who worked well past the end of the silent era, which proved the demarcation point for the end of Griffith's own career as director. This influence extended from directors that Griffith collaborated with and trained, such as Mack Sennett and Frank Powell, through those who only had glancing contact with him—such as Erich von Stroheim—and yet others in foreign lands who never worked with Griffith directly, for example, Jean Renoir and Sergei Eisenstein. The primary purpose of this list is to document the director names in the first two classes, while a more selective view is to be taken in the last class.

Griffith himself principally learned his craft with cinematographer/director Billy Bitzer, who worked alongside Griffith. Many of the technical developments once credited to Griffith were actually developed by Bitzer before they met.

== A ==
- John G. Adolfi

== B ==
- Lionel Barrymore
- George Beranger
- Arthur Berthelet
- Frank Borzage
- Karl Brown
- Tod Browning
- David Butler

== C ==
- Christy Cabanne
- Harry Carey
- Charles Chaplin
- Elmer Clifton
- Jack Conway
- Donald Crisp

== D ==
- Cecil B. DeMille
- Edward Dillon
- John Francis Dillon (director)
- Thomas Dixon, Jr.
- Carl Theodor Dreyer
- Allan Dwan

== E ==
- Sergei Eisenstein
- John Emerson

== F ==
- George Fawcett
- Victor Fleming
- John Ford
- Sidney Franklin

== G ==
- Abel Gance
- Gene Gauntier
- Clarence Geldart
- Lillian Gish
- Francis J. Grandon

== H ==
- Joseph Henabery
- Dell Henderson
- George Hill

== I ==
- Rex Ingram
- Charles Inslee

== J ==
- Arthur V. Johnson

== K ==
- Henry King
- James Kirkwood, Sr.
- Dimitri Kirsanoff

== L ==
- Wilfred Lucas

== M ==
- John P. McCarthy
- Oscar Micheaux
- David Miles
- Owen Moore
- Antonio Moreno

== N ==
- George Nicholls Jr.
- Mabel Normand

== O ==
- Anthony O'Sullivan

== P ==
- Alfred Paget
- Mary Pickford
- Frank Powell
- Vsevolod Pudovkin

== Q ==
- Billy Quirk

== R ==
- Wallace Reid
- Jean Renoir

== S ==
- Mack Sennett
- George Siegmann
- Harry Solter
- Erich von Stroheim

== T ==
- John Tansey
- Stanner E. V. Taylor
- George Terwilliger

== V ==
- W. S. Van Dyke
- King Vidor
- Robert G. Vignola

== W ==
- George Walsh
- Raoul Walsh
- Millard Webb
- Raymond Wells
- Jules White
