= The Mischief Maker =

1916 film by John G. Adolfi

- Directed by: John G. Adolfi
- Written by: John G. Adolfi; Alfred Solman
- Produced by: William Fox
- Starring: June Caprice; Harry Benham; John Reinhardt
- Cinematography: Rial Schellinger
- Production company: Fox Film Corporation
- Distributed by: Fox Film Corporation
- Release date: November 26, 1916
- Running time: 50 minutes
- Country: United States
- Languages: Silent; English intertitles

The Mischief Maker is a 1916 American silent comedy-drama film directed by John G. Adolfi and starring June Caprice, Harry Benham and John Reinhardt.

== Cast ==
- June Caprice as Effie Marchand
- Harry Benham as Al Tourney
- John Reinhardt as Jules Gerard
- Margaret Fielding as May Muprey
- Inez Ranous as Madame Briand
- Minnie Milne as Effie's Sister
- Tom Brooke as Henry Tourney
- Nellie Slattery as Mrs. Marchand

== Bibliography ==
- Solomon, Aubrey. The Fox Film Corporation, 1915-1935: A History and Filmography. McFarland, 2011.
