= Les Misérables (1909 film) =

1909 film

- Directed by: J. Stuart Blackton
- Based on: Les Misérables; 1862 novel by Victor Hugo
- Starring: Maurice Costello; William V. Ranous
- Distributed by: Vitagraph Company of America
- Release date: September 4, 1909
- Running time: 4 reels
- Country: United States
- Languages: Silent; English intertitles

Les Misérables is a 1909 American silent historical drama proto-feature film (four short films that can be seen separately as a series, but when combined resemble a full-length feature film). The proto-feature movie is based on the 1862 French novel of the same name by Victor Hugo, and stars Maurice Costello and William V. Ranous. It was directed by J. Stuart Blackton.

Distributed by the Vitagraph Company of America, the film consists of four reels. The reels were released over the course of three months, from September 4 to November 27, 1909.

== Plot ==
The film relates the lives of the French people during 20 years in the 19th century. The story focuses on Jean Valjean (Costello), an honest man who is running from an obsessive police inspector chasing him for an insignificant offense. Valjean escapes being incarcerated.

== Cast ==
- William V. Ranous as Javert
- Maurice Costello as Jean Valjean
- Hazel Neason
- Marc McDermott

== See also ==
- Adaptations of Les Misérables
