= Cinderella (1914 film) =

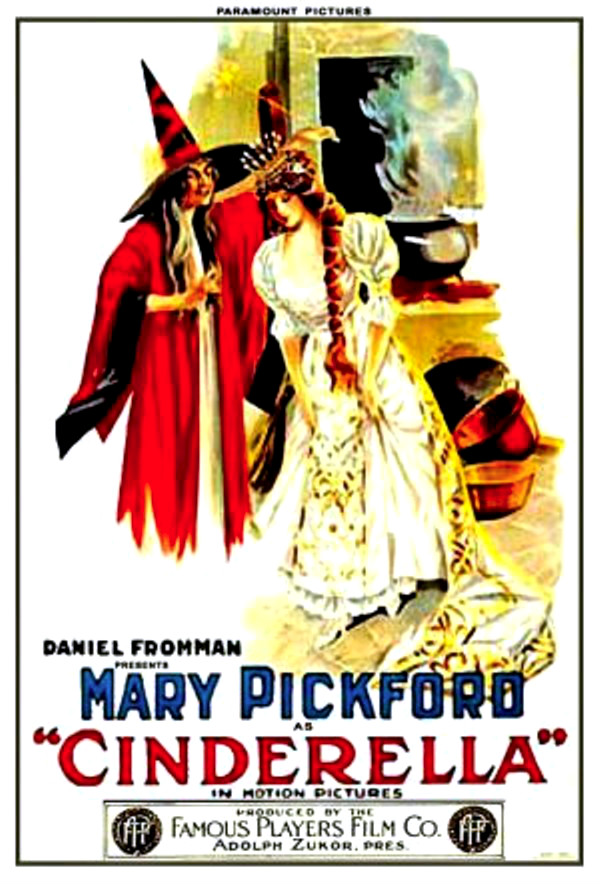
- Theatrical release poster
- Directed by: James Kirkwood Sr.
- Based on: Cinderella by Charles Perrault
- Produced by: Daniel Frohman; Adolph Zukor
- Starring: Mary Pickford
- Distributed by: Famous Players Film Company
- Release date: December 28, 1914
- Running time: 52 minutes (DVD) 100 minutes (Blu-ray)
- Country: United States
- Languages: Silent; English intertitles

Cinderella

Cinderella is a 1914 silent film starring Mary Pickford, directed by James Kirkwood Sr., produced by Daniel Frohman, and released by Famous Players Film Company. The film is based upon the fairy tale Cinderella. The film was released on Blu-ray & DVD as a bonus feature from the DVD of Through the Back Door (1921). It was previously released on DVD by Alpha Video.

== Plot ==
Cinderella is a kind young woman who lives with her wicked stepmother and ugly stepsisters. They abuse her and use her as the housemaid. One day Cinderella's stepmother and stepsisters refuse to help a beggar at their door, but Cinderella offers her food and drink. The beggar woman is revealed to be a beautiful fairy in disguise, who then secretly helps Cinderella for her kindness. One day when Cinderella is sent to gather firewood, her fairy godmother summons a troupe of fairies who secretly gather a bundle of wood for her. Cinderella meets Prince Charming who is walking in the woods, and each is smitten with the other in their short encounter.

Soon, a ball is arranged so the prince may choose his future wife. The sisters visit a witch-like fortune teller in the woods, who predicts that a member of their family will be chosen by the prince. The sisters are delighted, thinking it will be one of them.

That night, the stepsisters have nightmares of the old fortune teller, while Cinderella has pleasant dreams of fairies dancing.

When the stepsisters leave for the ball, Cinderella is left behind. The fairy godmother appears asks Cinderella to bring her a pumpkin, some mice, and some rats. The fairy transforms the pumpkin into a coach, the mice into horses, and the rats into grooms and footmen. Finally, she changes Cinderella's ragged dress into a gown fit for a princess (with glass slippers, of course). She tells Cinderella she must be back at home before the clock strikes midnight. If not, her fine dress will turn into rags and the coach and servants will become what they were before.

The unknown lady who arrives at the ball charms the guests, and especially the prince. He and Cinderella slip away to the garden. Their flirtations are interrupted by the clock striking midnight. Cinderella rushes away, losing one of her slippers, and she arrives home, a ragged cinder girl once more.

Cinderella tosses on her bed, suffering a surrealistic dream in which evil-looking dwarves ring the midnight bell and the numbers on the clock's face dance and scramble wildly. She is awakened by the arrival of her step-family, who kick her out of bed and set her to her daily drudgery again.

Later, heralds announce the Prince's wish to marry the woman whose foot fits the lost shoe. The sisters go to the palace, and a comic scene ensues as each tries to force her too-large foot into the dainty slipper. The Prince learns that every girl in the kingdom save one has tried the slipper on and failed the test, and announces that he will bring her to the palace himself. Finding Cinderella, he escorts her to the palace, where the slipper fits her. Her beautiful raiment is magically restored, and all bow to the future princess. Although a courtier suggests that this is an excellent opportunity for Cinderella to have her stepmother and stepsisters beheaded, she forgives them all.

The prince and Cinderella again sneak away to the garden. When midnight strikes, Cinderella panics and starts to run away again, but her fairy godmother reappears and blesses her, assuring her that a good and noble spirit is always rewarded.

== Cast ==
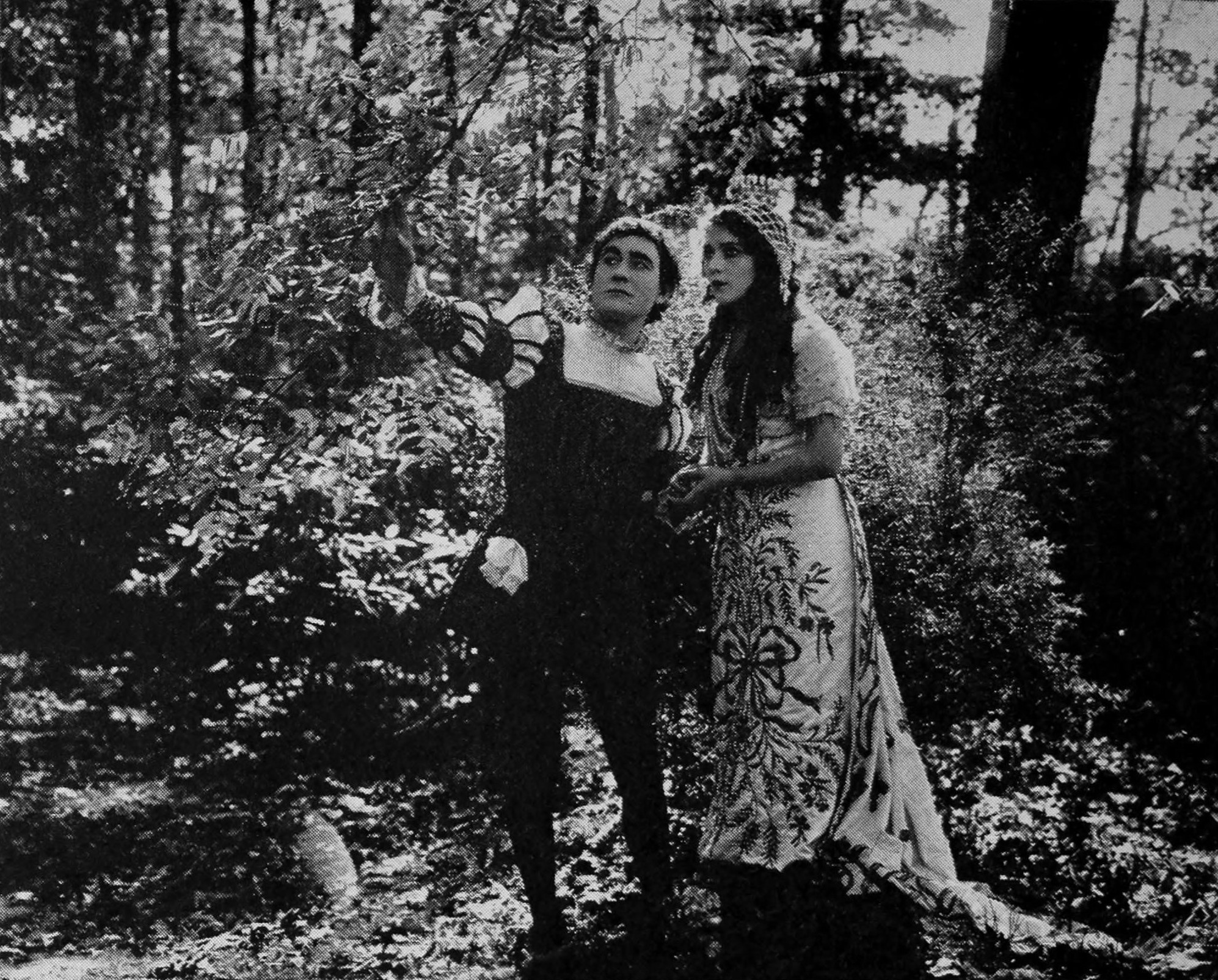
Owen Moore and Mary Pickford in Cinderella

- Mary Pickford - Cinderella
- Owen Moore - Prince Charming
- Isabel Vernon - Stepmother
- Georgia Wilson - Stepsister
- Lucille Carney - Stepsister
- W.N. Cone - The King
- Inez Marcel - Fairy godmother
