= The Taming of the Shrew (1908 film) =

1908 short movie by David W. Griffith

- Full film
- Directed by: D. W. Griffith
- Written by: D. W. Griffith; Harry Solter
- Based on: Play by William Shakespeare
- Produced by: American Mutoscope and Biograph Company; New York City
- Cinematography: G. W. Bitzer; Arthur Marvin
- Release date: November 10, 1908
- Running time: 17 minutes (@16 frame/s); original release length 1048 feet
- Country: United States
- Languages: Silent film English intertitles

The Taming of the Shrew is a 1908 silent film directed by D. W. Griffith and produced by the American Mutoscope and Biograph Company of New York City. The 17-minute short, which is based on the play of the same name by English playwright William Shakespeare, was filmed in just two days–October 1 and 7, 1908–at Biograph's studio in Manhattan and on location in nearby Coytesville, a borough of Fort Lee, New Jersey. It is the first film adaptation of the play. (The first British production came three years later in 1911.)

== Plot ==
Two suitors court Bianca, but her sister Katherina appears and drives away first a family servant, then the suitors, and finally Bianca herself. When their father brings in Katherina's music teacher, she is even more abusive, breaking a painting over the teacher's head, pinning him to the floor, and kicking him repeatedly. Undaunted, Petruchio asks Katherina's father for her hand in marriage, much to the latter's delight. When Katherina is apprised of Petruchio's intentions, she physically attacks him, but he nevertheless forces an engagement ring on her finger.

On the wedding day, when Katherina throws the ring on the ground, Petruchio proceeds to whip his servant. Then, he picks Katherina up and carries her off to his home.

When Katherina is displeased with Petruchio's cook and servant boy, he whips them, along with the rest of his servants. Food is brought, but before Katherina can dine, her husband finds the meal disgusting and drives the staff away. Next, a servant brings a dress and a hat, which Katherina likes, but Petruchio is not pleased; he attacks the servant and throws away the clothes. Later, a hungry Katherina goes to the kitchen and grabs a drumstick, but Petruchio takes it away from her and once again beats his cook and the other servants.

When Katherina's father arrives for a visit, she recounts what has happened. Her father slaps Petruchio twice and starts to take Katherina home, but then she has a change of heart and returns to Petruchio and they embrace. In the final scene, set outdoors, they kiss.

== Cast (in credits order) ==
- Florence Lawrence as Katherina
- Arthur V. Johnson as Petruchio
- Linda Arvidson as Bianca
- Harry Solter as Katherina's Father

The rest of cast listed alphabetically:

- Charles Avery as Music Teacher
- William J. Butler
- Gene Gauntier as Wedding Party
- George Gebhardt as One of Bianca's Suitors
- Guy Hedlund
- Charles Inslee as One of Bianca's Suitors
- Wilfred Lucas
- Jeanie MacPherson as Wedding Party
- Charles Moler
- Mack Sennett as Petruchio's Servant

== See also ==
- List of American films of 1908
