= Maurice Costello =

American actor (1877–1950)

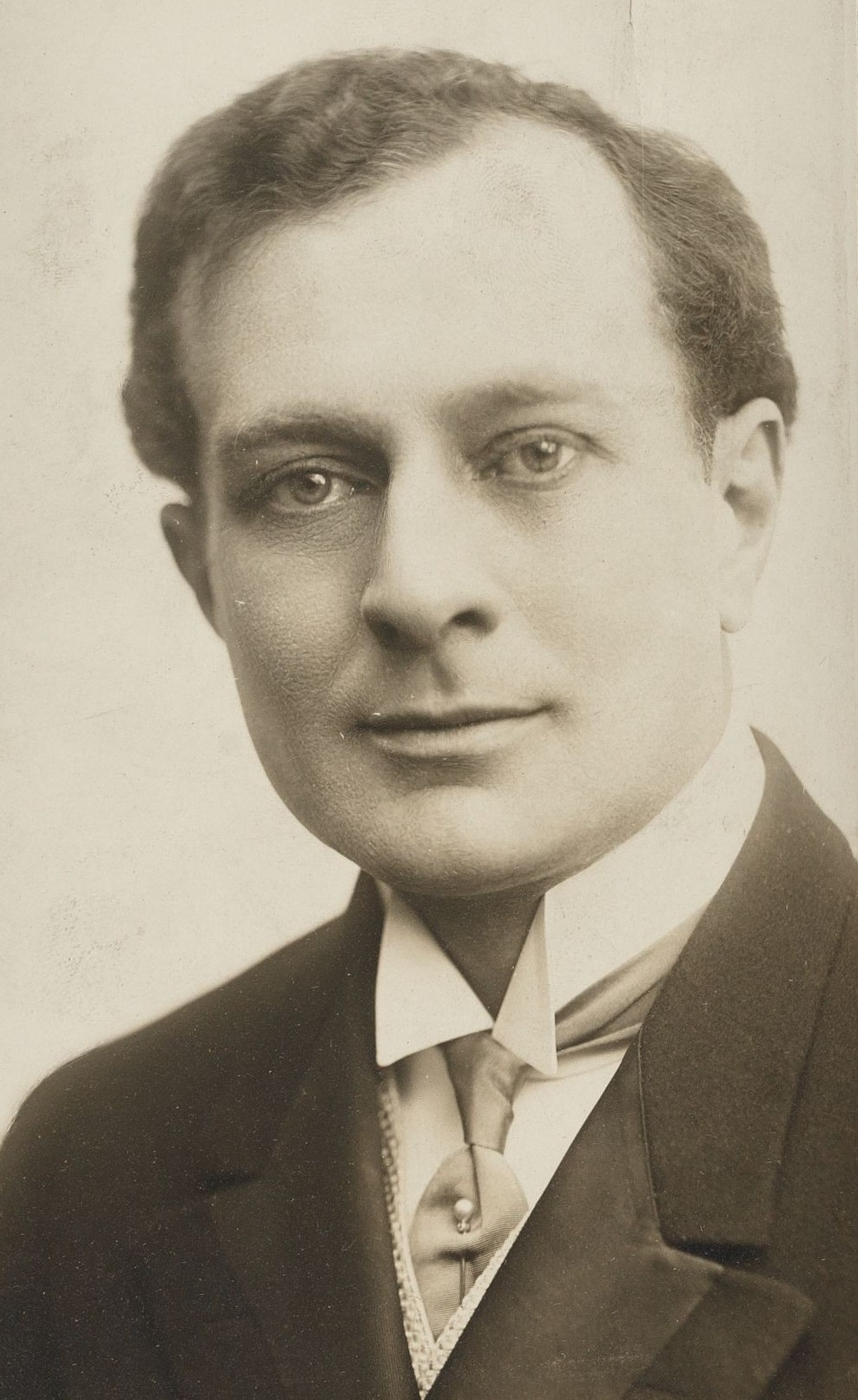
- Born: Maurice George Costello; February 22, 1877; Pittsburgh, Pennsylvania, U.S.
- Died: October 29, 1950 (aged 73); Hollywood, California, U.S.
- Burial place: Calvary Cemetery, East Los Angeles
- Occupations: Actor, director, screenwriter
- Years active: 1905–1945
- Spouses: Mae Costello (m. 1902; div. 1927) Ruth Reeves (m. 1939; div. 1941)
- Children: Dolores Costello; Helene Costello

Maurice George Costello (February 22, 1877 – October 29, 1950) was an American vaudeville and film actor who was a member of Vitagraph, the first motion picture stock company ever formed.

== Early life ==
Costello was born in Pittsburgh, Pennsylvania to Irish immigrants Ellen (née Fitzgerald; born 1853) and Thomas Costello (born 1852). His father Thomas died while repairing a blast furnace at Andrew Carnegie's Union Iron Mill when Maurice was just five months old. He had a strongly Irish upbringing, living with his mother, her Irish brother, and many Irish immigrant boarders.

== Career ==
Costello made his film debut in 1908, but was long believed to have debuted in Adventures of Sherlock Holmes; or, Held for Ransom (1905), supposedly playing the lead in what is regarded as the first serious film to feature the character of Sherlock Holmes, since it was preceded only by the 30-second comedy film Sherlock Holmes Baffled (1900). However, Holmesian scholar Leslie S. Klinger has written that the identification of Costello in the role is flawed. Klinger states that the first identification of Costello with the role was in Michael Pointer's Public Life of Sherlock Holmes published in 1975, but Pointer later realized his error and wrote to Klinger stating

"I am now aware that Maurice Costello could not have been in that film, as he had not joined the Vitagraph company by that date. I'm sorry that my book has been misleading, but I doubt that I shall have the opportunity for an amended reprint, and should not have the time to prepare one anyway."

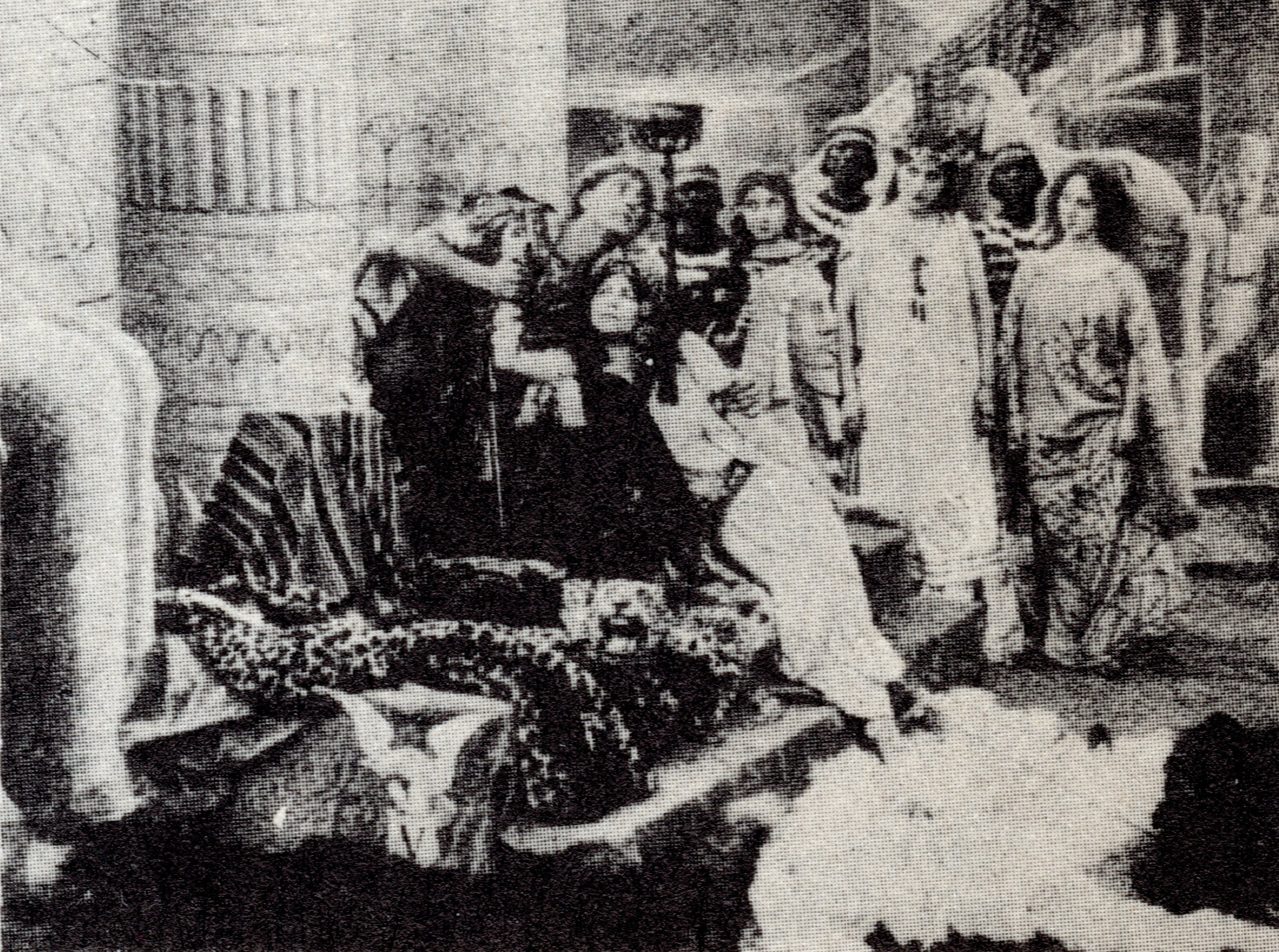
Costello and Florence Lawrence in Antony and Cleopatra (1908)

Costello joined Vitagraph, being a member of the first motion picture stock company ever formed, playing opposite Florence Turner. Among some of his best known pictures are A Tale of Two Cities, The Man Who Couldn't Beat God and For the Honor of the Family. Costello was notorious for his refusal to help build sets, insisting that he was "hired as an actor and nothing else", despite the common practice of the time. From this and his role as the creator of the first known school of screen acting, Costello is sometimes credited as "the father of screen acting".

Costello was one of the world's first leading men in early American cinema, but like a lot of other silent screen stars, he found the transition to "talkies" extremely difficult. While his leading man status was largely lost, he continued to appear in movies, often in small roles and bit parts, right up until his death in 1950.

Costello also discovered Moe Howard of the Three Stooges, who, as a teenager, ran errands and got lunches for the actors at the Vitagraph Studios at no charge. This impressed Costello, who brought him in and introduced him to other leading actors of the day. Howard then gained small parts in many of the Vitagraph movies, but most of these were destroyed by fire that swept the studios in 1910.

== Personal life ==
Costello was married to actress Mae Costello (née Altschuk). On November 23, 1913, Costello was arrested for beating his wife Mae. On November 25, he admitted that he had beaten his wife while intoxicated. Mae requested that the charges be dropped to disorderly conduct, and Costello was given six months' probation by Magistrate Geisner of the Coney Island Police Court.

Costello died in Los Angeles in 1950, aged 73, of a heart problem.

== Filmography ==
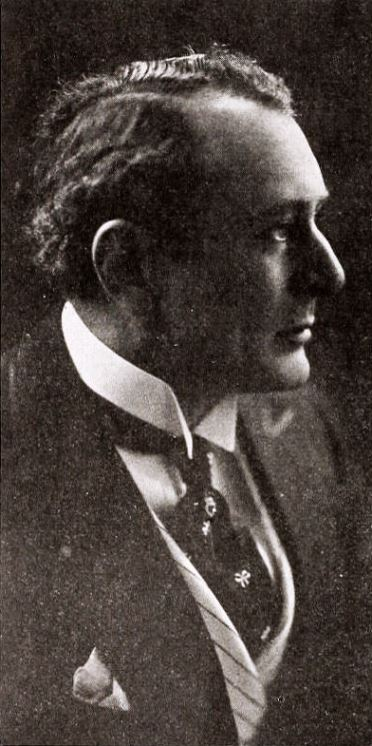
Maurice Costello in 1916

Year	Title	Role	Notes
1908	Antony and Cleopatra	Marc Antony	Short
1909	The Bride of Lammermoor	Edgar Ravenswood	Short; lost film
1909	Les Misérables	Jean Valjean	Short
1909	A Midsummer Night's Dream	Lysander	Short
1911	A Tale of Two Cities	Sydney Carton	Short
1911	His Sister's Children	Harry Burton	Short
1911	Some Good in All	Bill	Short
1911	Two Wolves and a Lamb	Bertie Belknap	Short
1912	As You Like It	Orlando	
1912	The Adventure of the Italian Model	Lambert Chase	
1912	The Adventure of a Thumb Print	Lambert Chase	
1912	The Mystery of the Seven Jewels	Lambert Chase	
1913	A Princess of Bagdad	Seyn – the cobbler	
1914	Mr. Barnes of New York	Mr. Barnes	
1915	The Man Who Couldn't Beat God	Martin Henchford	also co-directed
1915	The Crown Prince's Double	Prince Oscar / Barry Lawrence	
1916	The Crimson Stain Mystery	Harold Stanley	
1919	The Captain's Captain	John Sark	
1919	The Cambric Mask	John Sark	
1919	The Man Who Won	Henry Longfield	
1919	The Girl-Woman	Sanford	
1920	Human Collateral	Richard Morton	
1920	Deadline at Eleven	Paul Klocke	Lost film
1920	The Tower of Jewels	Fraser Grimstead	
1921	Conceit	Barbe la Fleche	
1922	Determination	Putnam	
1923	None So Blind	Russell Mortimer	
1923	The Glimpses of the Moon	Fred Gillow	
1923	Man and Wife	Caleb Perkins	
1923	Fog Bound	Deputy Brown	
1924	Let Not Man Put Asunder	Sir Humphrey	
1924	Roulette	Ben Corcoran	
1924	Week End Husbands	John Keane	
1924	Virtuous Liars	Josiah Wright	
1924	Love of Women	Mr. Redfield	
1924	Heart of Alaska		
1924	The Story Without a Name	the cripple	
1924	The Law and the Lady	Cyrus Blake	
1925	The Mad Marriage		
1926	The Wives of the Prophet	William Neil	
1926	The Last Alarm	fireman's father	
1926	The False Alarm		
1927	Camille	Armand's father	
1927	Johnny Get Your Hair Cut	Baxter Ryan	
1927	Wolves of the Air	Bob's Father	
1927	The Shamrock and the Rose	Father O'Brien	
1927	Spider Webs	Jeffrey Stanton	
1928	See You Later		
1928	The Wagon Show	Colonel Beldan	
1928	Black Feather		
1928	Eagle of the Night		Incomplete film
1934	Search for Beauty	Health Acres guest	Uncredited
1936	Hollywood Boulevard	director in commissary	
1938	I Am the Law	Lindsay staff member	Uncredited
1938	A Man to Remember	town councilor	Uncredited
1938	Comet Over Broadway	actor at dress rehearsal	Uncredited
1938	There's That Woman Again	headwaiter	Uncredited
1939	Disbarred	frightened juror	Uncredited
1939	It's a Wonderful World	guest	Uncredited
1939	Judge Hardy and Son	man in audience	Uncredited
1939	Five Little Peppers and How They Grew	Hart	Uncredited
1939	Mr. Smith Goes to Washington	Diggs – newsman	Uncredited
1939	The Roaring Twenties	nightclub patron	Uncredited
1940	Rovin' Tumbleweeds	Ways and Means Committee member	Uncredited
1940	The Ghost Comes Home	townsman at banquet	Uncredited
1940	Johnny Apollo	extra	Uncredited
1940	Edison, the Man	broker	Uncredited
1940	The Sea Hawk	man carrying spear	Uncredited
1940	All This, and Heaven Too	minor role	Uncredited
1940	foreign correspondent	minor role	Uncredited
1940	A Little Bit of Heaven	Uncle Louie	
1940	Third Finger, Left Hand	man at railroad station	Uncredited
1940	Tin Pan Alley		Uncredited
1941	A Man Betrayed	Club Inferno patron	Uncredited
1941	Lady from Louisiana	Edwards	
1941	Citizen Kane	extra	Uncredited
1941	Here Comes Mr. Jordan	ringsider at fight	Uncredited
1941	H.M. Pulham, Esq.	wedding guest	Uncredited
1942	Ride 'Em Cowboy	rodeo spectator with Martin Manning	Uncredited
1942	Reap the Wild Wind	ball guest	Uncredited
1942	Cairo	Cavity Rock townsman	Uncredited
1942	The Glass Key	card player	Uncredited
1942	Henry Aldrich, Editor	fire spectator	Uncredited
1943	Du Barry Was a Lady	passerby	Uncredited
1943	Sweet Rosie O'Grady	minor role	Uncredited
1944	A Fig Leaf for Eve	nightclub patron	Uncredited
1944	The Doughgirls	minor role	Uncredited
1944	The Climax	minor role	Uncredited
1944	Practically Yours	Senate stenographer	Uncredited
1945	Guest Wife	bit part	Uncredited, (final film role)
