= Two Seats at the Opera =

1916 film by William Garwood

- Directed by: William Garwood
- Written by: Harry Dittmar (scenario); Flora R. Snyder (story)
- Starring: William Garwood; William J. Welsh; William J. Dyer; Inez Ranous
- Distributed by: Universal Film Manufacturing Company
- Release date: July 16, 1916
- Country: United States
- Languages: Silent film English intertitles

Two Seats at the Opera is a 1916 American silent short comedy directed and starring William Garwood.

== Cast ==
- William J. Welsh as Dr. Jones
- William J. Dyer as Mr. Osgood
- Ines Marcell as Mrs. Osgood
- William Garwood as Michael Clancy
- Mary Fagan as Edwina Martina

== Plot ==
Dr. Jones is a bone setter who is consulted by Mr. Osgood, a highly anxious man. Dr. Jones tells him that he needs to relax and offers him two tickets to the opera. Nearby, a plumber, Michael Clancy (Garwood) is repairing pipes in the doctor's cellar and flirting with the doctor's cook Edwina (Fagan). Mrs. Osgood (Marcell) phones the plumbing office and Clancy is sent to the Osgood house to fix the radiator. Before starting the repair, Clancy reads about a diamond robbery, believed to be an inside job, where thieves made off with $100,000, and tells an associate that he intends to become a burglar. When Clancy arrives at the Osgood home, Mr. Osgood offers him the opera tickets.
