= Deceived Slumming Party =

- Directed by: D. W. Griffith
- Starring: Edward Dillon; D. W. Griffith; George Gebhardt
- Release date: July 31, 1908
- Running time: 7 minutes
- Country: United States
- Languages: Silent; English intertitles

Deceived Slumming Party is a 1908 American comedy film directed by D. W. Griffith. Several scenes of tours being conducted in New York City. At the end of each scene it becomes obvious that the events of the tours have been set up to shock and defraud the tourists.

== Cast ==
- Edward Dillon as Guide (as Eddie Dillon)
- D. W. Griffith as Reginald O.C. Wittington
- George Gebhardt as Chinese
- Charles Inslee as Chinese
- Anthony O'Sullivan as Chinese
- Mack Sennett as Policeman / Waiter
- Harry Solter as Chinese

== See also ==
- D. W. Griffith filmography
- List of American films of 1908
