= Dora Knowlton Ranous =

American actress

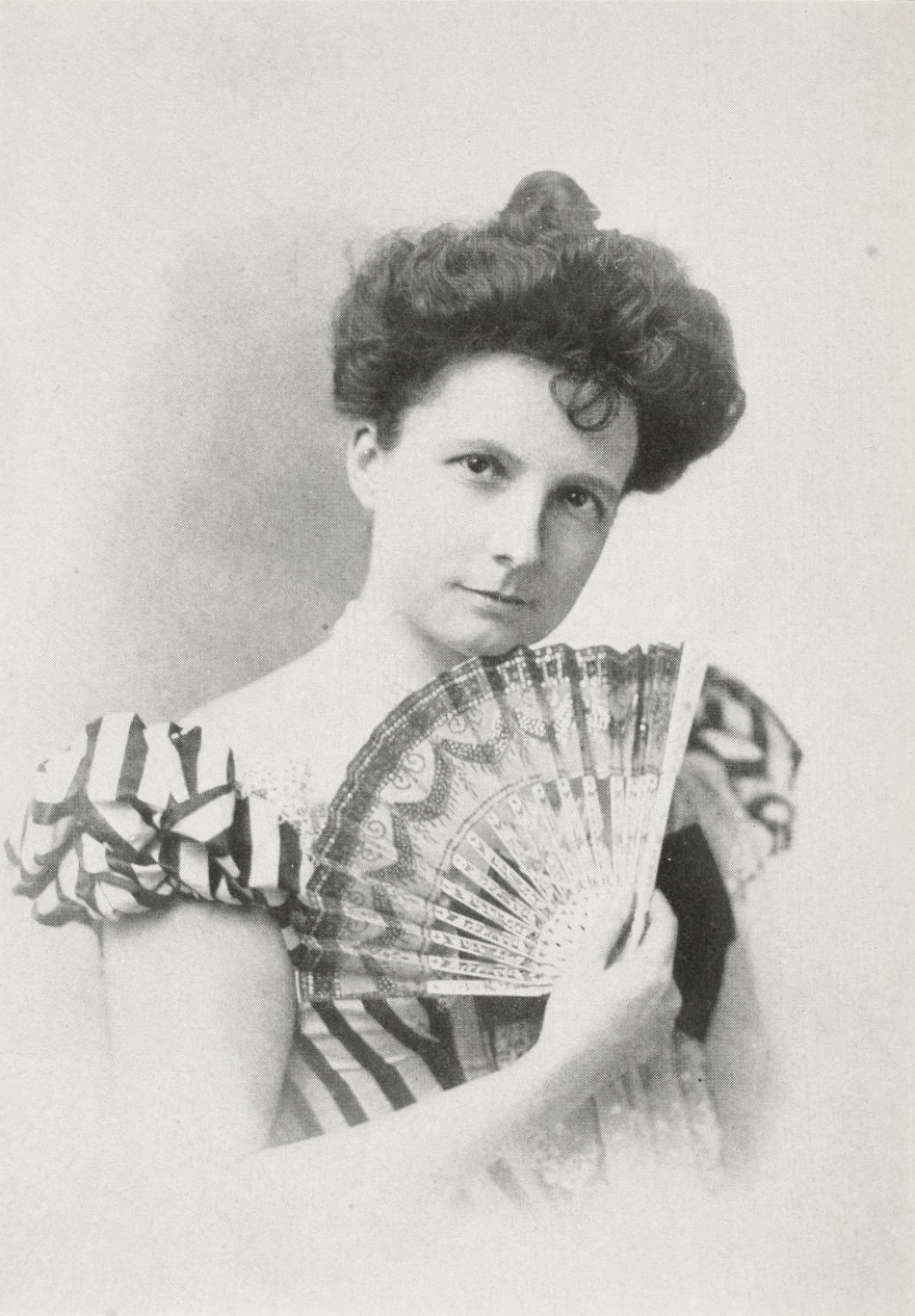
- Photo in Dora Knowlton Ranous, Author--editor--translator: A Simple Record of a Noble Life, 1916
- Born: Doris Isabelle Knowlton Thompson; August 16, 1859; Ashfield, Massachusetts, U.S.
- Died: January 19, 1916 (aged 56); New York City, New York State, U.S.
- Resting place: Plain Cemetery, Ashfield, Massachusetts
- Education: Packer Collegiate Institute
- Occupations: actress, author, editor, translator, book reviewer
- Spouse: William Vardell Ranous (m. 1881; divorced)
- Children: Alice Knowlton Ranous Chubb
- Writing career
- Language: English
- Notable works: Diary of a Daly Debutante, Good English in Good Form, A Simple Record of a Noble Life

Dora Knowlton Ranous (August 16, 1859 – January 19, 1916) was an American actress, author, editor, translator, and book reviewer. She began her literary career editing educational books and contributing to Appleton's Annual Cyclopaedia and The Criterion. Ranous attained distinction as a translator of French and Italian classics, and among the books rendered into English by her, either alone or in collaboration with Rossiter Johnson, whom she assisted, are The Literature of Italy, The Immortals, a collection of French works published under the sanction of the Académie Française; Guy de Maupassant's stories in fifteen volumes, and Gustave Flaubert's writings in ten volumes. She wrote two books of her own, The Diary of a Daly Debutante and Good English in Good Form. A memoir entitled A Simple Record of a Noble Life, which included some of her unpublished work, appeared in 1916.

== Early years and education ==
Doris Isabelle Knowlton Thompson was born in Ashfield, Massachusetts, August 16, 1859. She was the daughter of Alexander Hamilton and Augusta (Knowlton) Thompson. Her father was an accountant in the service of the United States Navy. Her sister Grace was born in 1857.

The sisters had the advantage of the well-rounded governess, Beatrice deMille, who taught them French and music at an early age. After that, they attended the common school, where Ranous was noted especially for her ability to "spell down" the class. Then they were graduated at Sanderson Academy, in Ashfield, and their schooling was completed at Packer Collegiate Institute, in Brooklyn, where their parents had a winter home.

The family were Episcopalians, but Ranous attended Henry Ward Beecher's church, attracted by his eloquence, and was a member of the Bible-class taught by Thomas Gaskell Shearman, eminent as an advocate of free trade and as a writer of law books. Under his tutelage, she read the Bible from Genesis to Revelation, and found pleasure in the study of it.

The sisters' summer home was in Ashfield, which was also the location of the summer homes of Charles Eliot Norton and George William Curtis, who naturally attracted such visitors as James Russell Lowell, Francis Parkman, Charles Dudley Warner, and John W. Field. The last-named was a retired merchant of Philadelphia and an intimate friend of Lowell and of Robert Browning.

== Career ==
She married William Vardell Ranous, at Whitby, Ontario, May 26, 1881, and soon afterward she left the stage. They had a daughter, Alice Knowlton Ranous, in 1882. The couple later divorced. She never married again. In 1892 her mother died.

About 1893, through unfortunate investment, Ranous lost the property that she had inherited. But this did not discourage her. She mastered stenography in half the usual time required, and set at work to earn her own living and the funds necessary for her daughter's education. This was completed in the Henry Churchill de Mille school at Pompton, New Jersey; and then the daughter also learned stenography and began to support herself. Ranous served for some time as assistant in an establishment that dealt in rare books and autographs, and acquired much knowledge of that peculiar business. She had always been interested in autographs, and had made a small but interesting collection.

=== Writer ===
Ranous entered upon literary work in 1898, as editor of educational text-books for Silver, Burdett & Co.

In the spring of 1901, she joined D. Appleton & Company, and contributed to Appleton's Annual Cyclopedia and to The Criterion magazine. In 1903, she was engaged to assist Robert Arnot, a learned Oxonian, in editing sets of books for the subscription business of M. Walter Dunne, to include the first complete editions of works of Guy de Maupassant (15 vols.) and Gustave Flaubert (10 vols.), and edited a 20-vol. edition of Benjamin Disraeli, Earl of Beaconsfield. This work extended into 1904, and on its completion she was engaged, still in association with Arnot, upon a set of books known as The Immortals. This consisted of translations of twenty French novels, each of which had been crowned by the Académie française. For this set, besides doing her usual editorial work, she made original translations of Rene Bazin's The Ink Stain, Anatole France's The Red Lily, André Theuriet's A Woodland Queen, and Phillipe De Massa's Zibeline, A Turn of Luck, The Scar, and Mount Ida. This work was completed in 1905.

In March 1906, after her daughter, now Mrs. Chubb, died of tuberculosis, Ranous assumed the charge of her grandchild, Catherine, and began all over again the task of supporting, rearing, and educating, which she relinquished only when the granddaughter was in her eleventh year and Ranous's health was so broken as to forbid a continuation. The child then went to live in her father's house in Brooklyn. In that same year, Ranous was the editor and translator (with Rossiter Johnson) for the National Alumni (New York City) of The Literature of Italy (16 vols.), as well as of The Authors' Digest (20 vols.).

In 1910–11, she wrote much of the historical volume in the Foundation Library for Young People. Ranous was a member of the editorial staff of Funk & Wagnalls' new Standard Dictionary, from July, 1911, to September, 1912, where she was entrusted with the work of reading the plate proofs. Then came an interval, which she improved by compiling a cook-book for an Ashfield townsman who had become a publisher in New York. She was the author of The Diary of a Daly Debutante, 1910 (first edition published anonymously), in which she told the story of her life behind the footlights. She wrote book reviews for the Holiday Issue of The Bookseller, Newsdealer and Stationer. She was connected with the editorial staff of the University Society.

When World War I broke out in 1914, Ranous was called to the headquarters of the Student Volunteer Movement for Foreign Missions, to edit the addresses delivered before the International Convention that had been held in Kansas City. These fill a large volume, containing about one million words, and she edited every page of the manuscript, and read all the proofs, her work being acknowledged with thanks in the General Secretary's Introductory Note. This done, she next edited an elaborate cable code for the use of the missionaries. In 1915, under the patronage of Milo M. Belding, she finished a peculiar piece of work—the "grangerizing" of Howes' History of Ashfield, which she extended with illustrations till it made two volumes, which were bound and deposited in the Belding Memorial Library in that village. Her last visit to her old home was to attend the dedication of the new Alvah N. Belding Memorial Library building in the summer of that year. In her last year, she wrote for Sturgis & Walton a volume entitled Good English in Good Form, and she lived to read the proof, but not to see a copy of the bound book.

== Personal life ==
Ranous favored woman suffrage. In the last year of her life she visited her old friends Mrs. Coleman in Washington and Mrs. Judkins in Nantucket.

Her mother and her mother's mother had died of paralysis, and she always expected to go the same way. She had a considerable stroke in December, 1914, and a lighter one six months later. Then her sense of taste was gone, her strength declined steadily, and it was discovered that she had a serious heart trouble, which gave her constant pain. At the last, also, her sight was failing; and as she had not a living relative except the granddaughter and a cousin in Iowa, the sense of loneliness in its intensity overwhelmed her. Ranous committed suicide by inhaling gas in her room at 246 West 103rd Street, New York City, on January 19, 1916. Her suicide was peculiarly tragic, as she became very despondent at the prospect of losing her eyesight, and she had also suffered from a stroke of paralysis, having left St. Luke's Hospital but a short time before her death. In a letter which was found in her room, she said there was no one to take care of her and she could not endure the "blackest misery" that was before her.

== Selected works ==
- Diary of a Daly Debutante (New York: Duffield It Company, 1910)
- Good English in Good Form (New York: Sturgis & Walton Company, 1916)
- A Simple Record of a Noble Life (1916)

=== Translations ===
- René Bazin's The Ink Stain
- Anatole France's The Red Lily
- André Theuriet's A Woodland Queen
- Phillipe De Massa's Zibeline, A Turn of Luck, The Scar, and Mount Ida
