= Spider Webs (film) =

1927 silent drama film directed by Wilfred Noy

- Directed by: Wilfred Noy
- Screenplay by: Charles Horan
- Based on: "The Fast Pace" by H. G. Logalton
- Produced by: Daniel Frohman
- Starring: Niles Welch; Alice Lake
- Cinematography: J. Roy Hunt; Alvin Wyckoff
- Production company: Artlee Pictures Corp.
- Release date: May 1, 1927
- Running time: 60 min.
- Country: United States
- Language: English

Spider Webs is a 1927 American silent drama film directed by Wilfred Noy. The film stars Niles Welch, Alice Lake, and featured Maurice Costello. It was adapted for film by Charles Horan based on the short story titled "The Fast Pace" by H.G. Logalton.

== Cast ==
- Niles Welch as Bert Grantland
- Alice Lake as Flora Benham
- J. Barney Sherry as Chester Sanfrew
- Martin Faust as Joe Dickson
- Bert Harvey as Nick Sinclair
- Maurice Costello as Jeffrey Stanton
- Edna Richmond as Mrs. Stanton

== Preservation ==
Spider Webs is currently presumed lost. In February of 2021, the film was cited by the National Film Preservation Board on their Lost U.S. Silent Feature Films list.
