= FBI season 6 =

Season of American television series

FBI
- Season 6
- Starring: Missy Peregrym; Zeeko Zaki; John Boyd; Katherine Renee Kane; Alana de la Garza; Jeremy Sisto
- No. of episodes: 13

Release
- Original network: CBS
- Original release: February 13 – May 21, 2024

Season chronology
- ← Previous; Season 5 Next → Season 7

The sixth season of the American police procedural television drama series FBI was announced on May 9, 2022, along with the fifth season. The sixth season premiered on February 13, 2024, and ended on May 21, with a total of 13 episodes.

== Cast and characters ==
=== Main ===
- Missy Peregrym as Maggie Bell, FBI Special Agent.
- Zeeko Zaki as Omar Adom "OA" Zidan, FBI Special Agent and Maggie's partner.
- John Boyd as Stuart Scola, FBI Special Agent and Tiffany's field partner.
- Katherine Renee Kane as Tiffany Wallace, FBI Special Agent.
- Alana de la Garza as Isobel Castille, FBI Special Agent-in-Charge (SAC).
- Jeremy Sisto as Jubal Valentine, FBI Assistant Special Agent-in-Charge (ASAC).

=== Recurring ===
- Roshawn Franklin as Trevor Hobbs, FBI Special Agent and Intelligence Analyst
- James Chen as Ian Lim, an FBI Technical Analyst
- Taylor Anthony Miller as Kelly Moran, an FBI Analyst
- Vedette Lim as Elise Taylor, an FBI Intelligence Analyst
- Tara Anika Nicolas as DEA Representative Jordan
- Gabe Bowling as NYPD Representative Walsh
- Comfort Clinton as Gemma Brooks, OA's love interest
- Rose Decker as Ella Blake, Jessica Blake's daughter

=== Crossover characters ===
- Shantel VanSanten as Special Agent Nina Chase, Stuart's girlfriend and mother of Douglas (FBI: Most Wanted).

=== Guest ===
- Charlotte Sullivan as Special Agent Jessica Blake, a former Counterterrorism Agent
- Kate Burton as Evelyn Kates, the US Deputy Secretary of State

== Episodes ==
No. overall	No. in season	Title	Directed by	Written by	Original release date	Prod. code	U.S. viewers (millions)
101	1	"All the Rage"	Alex Chapple	Rick Eid & Joe Halpin	February 13, 2024	FBI601	7.70
When a bus explosion kills several people, the team races to prevent future attacks and stop the person responsible with the ensuing investigation later resulting in the death of fellow agent Trevor Hobbs. They determine that the attack is linked to Somali terrorist organisation, Al-Shabaab, and that the attacker wanted to draw attention to the US's involvement overseas. Hobbs' death takes a toll on Tiffany, who becomes determined to find the attacker, but is disappointed when they're unsuccessful. The team later holds a memorial ceremony in the lobby of 26 Fed, with OA even revealing that after Hobbs told him on the first day they met he wouldn't be able to remember OA's full name, so Hobbs gave him his nickname.
102	2	"Remorse"	Carlos Bernard	Alexander Maggio	February 20, 2024	FBI602	7.13
When the president of the New York Federal Reserve Duncan Martin is murdered by seemingly trying to be a good samaritan, the team investigate and soon find themselves racing against time to not only apprehend the suspect but also save Gabby Martinez, the younger sister of Jillian Martinez, both of whom went missing eight years ago and were presumed dead. Jubal takes a personal interest in the case, knowing that he originally investigated the sisters' disappearance. Meanwhile, Jubal also deals with the news that his son, Tyler has been suspended from school after being caught drinking.
103	3	"Stay in Your Lane"	Alex Chapple	Rick Eid & Joe Halpin	February 27, 2024	FBI603	6.38
Local bar owner Eric Cantwell is abducted and later dies of his injuries, leaving the FBI with a clue of Russians being behind his abduction. Investigation reveals that he and his partner were in debt to a Ukrainian club owner and his enforcer Viktor. Since neither of them paid their debts, the FBI's theory is that Viktor was sent to kill them. During the case, OA is shocked to learn that his new love interest Gemma frequents the club and worries that she is involved with the wrong crowd.
104	4	"Creating a Monster"	Milena Govich	Peter Elkoff	March 12, 2024	FBI604	7.12
Federal judge Charles Pollan is killed in broad daylight, and a quote from his killer leads the team to the local Islamic center, where they encounter undercover agent Hassan Khalil. It's revealed that Khalil is working with Maggie's former Quantico mentor, Jessica Blake, on taking down an Islamic terror cell which the killer is suspected of being involved in. OA finds the case complicated with Khalil's approach to the killer thinking he could have gone too far. Additionally, he tells Gemma the truth about the mission that killed her friend (from the last episode), after which she demands him to leave.: Charlotte Sullivan (Jessica Blake) is credited as a Special Guest Star.
105	5	"Sacrifice"	Laura Belsey	Bryce Ahart & Stephanie McFarlane	March 19, 2024	FBI605	7.12
Migrant center director Matthew Sawyer is abducted while leaving work. It's revealed that the abductor, former Mexican cop Hector Ramirez, suspected Sawyer of kidnapping his daughter Maria. The team rush to locate his daughter and defusing the situation, with Maggie letting herself be taken hostage.: Charlotte Sullivan (Jessica Blake) is credited as a Special Guest Star.
106	6	"Unforeseen"	Milena Govich	Joe Halpin & Marley Schneier	March 26, 2024	FBI606	6.76
Angela Lane, an employee with the Bureau of Land Management is sprayed with ricin gas on the subway and dies shortly after. Another woman who worked as a lobbyist for fracking company Green Solutions, also succumbs to the poison. Evidence leads them to a group of conservationists, where two members decided to resort to violence for the cause. During the case, Jessica Blake collapses during the search of Landon's house and is hospitalised with an aneurysm and later dies during surgery. Maggie now faces the prospect of looking after Blake's young daughter, Ella.: Charlotte Sullivan (Jessica Blake) is credited as a Special Guest Star.
107	7	"Behind the Veil"	Eric Laneuville	Peter Elkoff & Alexander Maggio	April 2, 2024	FBI607	6.88
Castille is injured during a bombing of a restaurant, which claims the life of congresswoman Carol Jones. The bombing leads the team to an anarchist chatroom, where they identify the user supplying the bombs to be a Russian agent working at the consulate, Marina Kostova. The State Department however warns them to not arrest her due to an ongoing prisoner exchange, despite evidence suggesting Kostova's involvement. The team rush to stop another bomb, which is identified to be planted at an expo center where a right-wing alliance is meant to hold an event. Meanwhile, Maggie settles in trying to take care of Ella, while OA and Gemma figure out how to move forward with their relationship.
108	8	"Phantom"	Jean de Segonzac	Rick Eid	April 9, 2024	FBI608	6.40
Military weapons dealer James Sun is shot and killed during a purchase of RDX explosives. The team swiftly identify the buyer and he confesses to the murder, but also provides them with a buyer for the RDX. Scola and Tiffany meet the buyer undercover, and learn that he is buying the explosives on behalf of Al-Shabaab. Tiffany sees someone resembling their ringleader, Hakim Siran, despite reports that he is in Africa. Her guilt over Hobbs' death affects her work as she begins to insist on finding Siran after his supposed sighting, derailing the operation after her and Scola's covers are blown and a chase ensues with the buyer.
109	9	"Best Laid Plans"	Alex Chapple	Rick Eid & Joe Halpin	April 16, 2024	FBI609	7.09
Retired FBI agent Mike Rosen is abducted, tortured and killed after being forced to provide a group of robbers the location of a diamond transport from his security firm. The team disable one and later another robber who briefly escapes, and link his identity with the Perez brothers, who deals with diamonds. The case is complicated when they apprehend Samuel Jacobson, who is an informant for Stuart's girlfriend Nina Chase. Through Jacobson, Stuart and Nina go undercover as a couple looking for diamonds and ensure a deal at a Manhattan apartment with Beto Perez. During the case, Stuart clashes with Nina on the risks of them doing it together, expressing a preference for a safer approach. In the end they agree to stand in things together.: Shantel VanSanten (Nina Chase) is credited as a Special Guest Star.
110	10	"Family Affair"	Alex Zakrzewski	Bryce Ahart & Stephanie McFarlane	April 23, 2024	FBI610	7.03
Off-duty FDIC security guard Will Douglas is killed when checking up on a suspected domestic abuse after visiting a date. The team learns that the victim of the suspected domestic abuse, Denise Mamet, was the surrogate mother of the Webb family, who were forced to give up her address. Furthermore, Mamet is pregnant and the daughter of Secret Testament cult leader Aaron Mamet and follower Travis Keating abducted her for the purpose of cleansing her. The operation takes a toll on Maggie, making her worry about Ella becoming orphaned should something happen to her.
111	11	"No One Left Behind"	Monica Raymund	Peter Elkoff	May 7, 2024	FBI611	6.13
Tyler Grant, the protege of tech mogul Leo Grant, is abducted by armed men and forced to reveal the location of Grant's meeting with representatives of the Taliban. Taliban leader Abdul Sayeed is abducted by the men, and the FBI traces a discarded flashbang to dentist Michael Garrett, who reveals his son James is being held as a prisoner-of-war in Afghanistan, and Sayeed has been taken by his son's old unit to force a prisoner exchange, which the Taliban have agreed to. The team locates the soldiers, and OA tries to negotiate rather than breaching the hideout as ordered. Meanwhile, OA's relationship with Gemma faces challenges of openness, and he later manages to tell her about a past captivity.
112	12	"Consequences"	Carlos Bernard	Alexander Maggio	May 14, 2024	FBI612	5.99
Truck driver Tim Baker is killed in the Jamaica Bay Wildlife Refuge and the team learns that he was transporting a major ingredient of fentanyl, with half his load missing. They later discover that the fentanyl is disguised as oxycodone pills, which a group of girls overdose upon in a night club. Jubal is surprised to learn that his godson Nate Becerra supplied the girls with the pills, and becomes caught between his duty as an FBI agent and loyalty to his friend and former agent, Jose Becerra, after a bag of pills is discovered in Nate's room.
113	13	"Ring of Fire"	Alex Chapple	Rick Eid & Joe Halpin	May 21, 2024	FBI613	6.14
Maggie returns from leave as the team investigate the death of truck driver Lucas Chandler, but his cargo has not been stolen. A woman perishes when her car explodes, and Chandler is revealed to have been a new identity for former soldier Nick Ward. Both of whom they learn worked for the CIA, and that crates of thermal grenades were actually stolen from Ward's truck. The factory head of the weapons producer is also murdered, of which the lead points to Al-Shabaab and Hobb’s killers.: This episode marks the final appearance of Katherine Renee Kane (Tiffany Wallace) in the opening credit and also as a series regular.

== Production ==
On May 9, 2022, CBS renewed the series for both a fifth and sixth season. The season was delayed due to the 2023 Hollywood labor disputes including the 2023 Writers Guild of America strike and 2023 SAG-AFTRA strike.

In March 2024, it was announced that Peregrym's Rookie Blue co-star Charlotte Sullivan would join the guest cast of the sixth season while Katherine Renee Kane as Tiffany Wallace departed at the end of the season as series regular.

== Ratings ==
Viewership and ratings per episode of FBI season 6
No.	Title	Air date	Rating (18–49)	Viewers (millions)	DVR (18–49)	DVR viewers (millions)	Total (18–49)	Total viewers (millions)
1	"All the Rage"	February 13, 2024	0.6	7.70	—N/a	—N/a	—N/a	—N/a
2	"Remorse"	February 20, 2024	0.5	7.13	—N/a	—N/a	—N/a	—N/a
3	"Stay in Your Lane"	February 27, 2024	0.5	6.38	—N/a	—N/a	—N/a	—N/a
4	"Creating a Monster"	March 12, 2024	0.5	7.12	—N/a	—N/a	—N/a	—N/a
5	"Sacrifice"	March 19, 2024	0.6	7.12	0.2	1.92	0.7	9.04
6	"Unforeseen"	March 26, 2024	0.5	6.76	0.2	2.11	0.7	8.87
7	"Behind the Veil"	April 2, 2024	0.5	6.88	0.2	2.17	0.7	9.05
8	"Phantom"	April 9, 2024	0.5	6.40	0.1	2.05	0.6	8.45
9	"Best Laid Plans"	April 16, 2024	0.5	7.09	0.2	1.85	0.7	8.93
10	"Family Affair"	April 23, 2024	0.4	7.03	0.2	2.03	0.6	9.05
11	"No One Left Behind"	May 7, 2024	0.5	6.13	0.2	1.93	0.6	8.06
12	"Consequences"	May 14, 2024	0.4	5.99	0.1	1.83	0.6	7.83
13	"Ring of Fire"	May 21, 2024	0.4	6.14	—N/a	—N/a	—N/a	—N/a
