= Macbeth (1908 film) =

1908 film

- Directed by: James Stuart Blackton
- Written by: William Shakespeare (play)
- Starring: William Ranous
- Release date: April 19, 1908
- Country: United States
- Language: Silent with English intertitles

Macbeth is a silent 1908 American film directed by James Stuart Blackton based on the William Shakespeare play of the same name. It is the second known film version of that play after a short fighting sequence was filmed in 1905 by an unknown director. It was a black and white silent film that had English intertitles. It is currently unknown if any print of the film still exists. A police report to censorship authorities mentioning the scene of the murder of Duncan in the film "might otherwise stand unabashed as the first piece of intelligent criticisim in the field of Shakespearean film".

== Cast ==
- William Ranous as Macbeth
- Paul Panzer as Macduff
- Charles Kent as Duncan
- Louise Carver as Lady Macbeth
- Édouard de Max
- Florence Lawrence as Banquet Guest
- Florence Turner as Banquet Guest

== See also ==
- List of American films of 1908
