= A Christmas Carol (1908 film) =

1908 silent film

- Based on: A Christmas Carol; 1843 novella by Charles Dickens
- Starring: Thomas Ricketts
- Distributed by: Essanay Studios
- Release date: December 9, 1908
- Running time: 15 minutes
- Country: United States
- Languages: Silent film English intertitles

A Christmas Carol is a 1908 silent film produced by Essanay Studios in Chicago, and the first American film adaptation of Charles Dickens' famous 1843 novella of the same name. Tom Ricketts stars as Ebenezer Scrooge in the film, which is considered a lost film.

== Plot ==
No prints of the first American film adaptation of A Christmas Carol are known to exist, but The Moving Picture World magazine provided a scene-by-scene description before the film's release. Scrooge goes into his office and begins working. His nephew, along with three women who wish for Scrooge to donate enter. However, Scrooge dismisses them. On the night of Christmas Eve, his long-dead partner Jacob Marley comes as a ghost, warning him of a horrible fate if he does not change his ways. Scrooge meets three spirits that show Scrooge the real meaning of Christmas, along with his grave, the result of his parsimonious ways. The next morning, he wakes and realizes the error of his ways. Scrooge was then euphoric and generous for the rest of his life.

== Cast ==
- Thomas Ricketts as Ebenezer Scrooge

Preservation status: the 1908 adaptation of a Christmas Carol is regarded as a lost film with no surviving footage or pictures. Only a description book of the lost film still exists. Many films made before 1929 were discarded or lost to deterioration over time. This may have been the fate of the negatives for the 1908 A Christmas Carol adaptation.

== Production ==
A Christmas Carol was produced by the Essanay Film Manufacturing Company and released December 9, 1908.

== Reception ==
"It is impossible to praise this film too highly", wrote The Moving Picture World magazine. "It reproduces the story as closely as it is possible to do in a film and the technical excellence of the work cannot be questioned. The photography, the staging and the acting are all of the best, and the story told is always impressive. ... Such films cannot be too highly commended. They are a welcome relief from the riot of bloodshed which has marred the moving picture shows of New York and other cities far too long. Even though it costs a fortune almost to prepare such a film, it is quite likely that the public will patronize it sufficiently to make good the extraordinary outlay."

== See also ==
- List of Christmas films
- List of ghost films
- List of American films of 1908
- List of A Christmas Carol adaptations
