= Antony and Cleopatra (1908 film) =

1908 silent short film

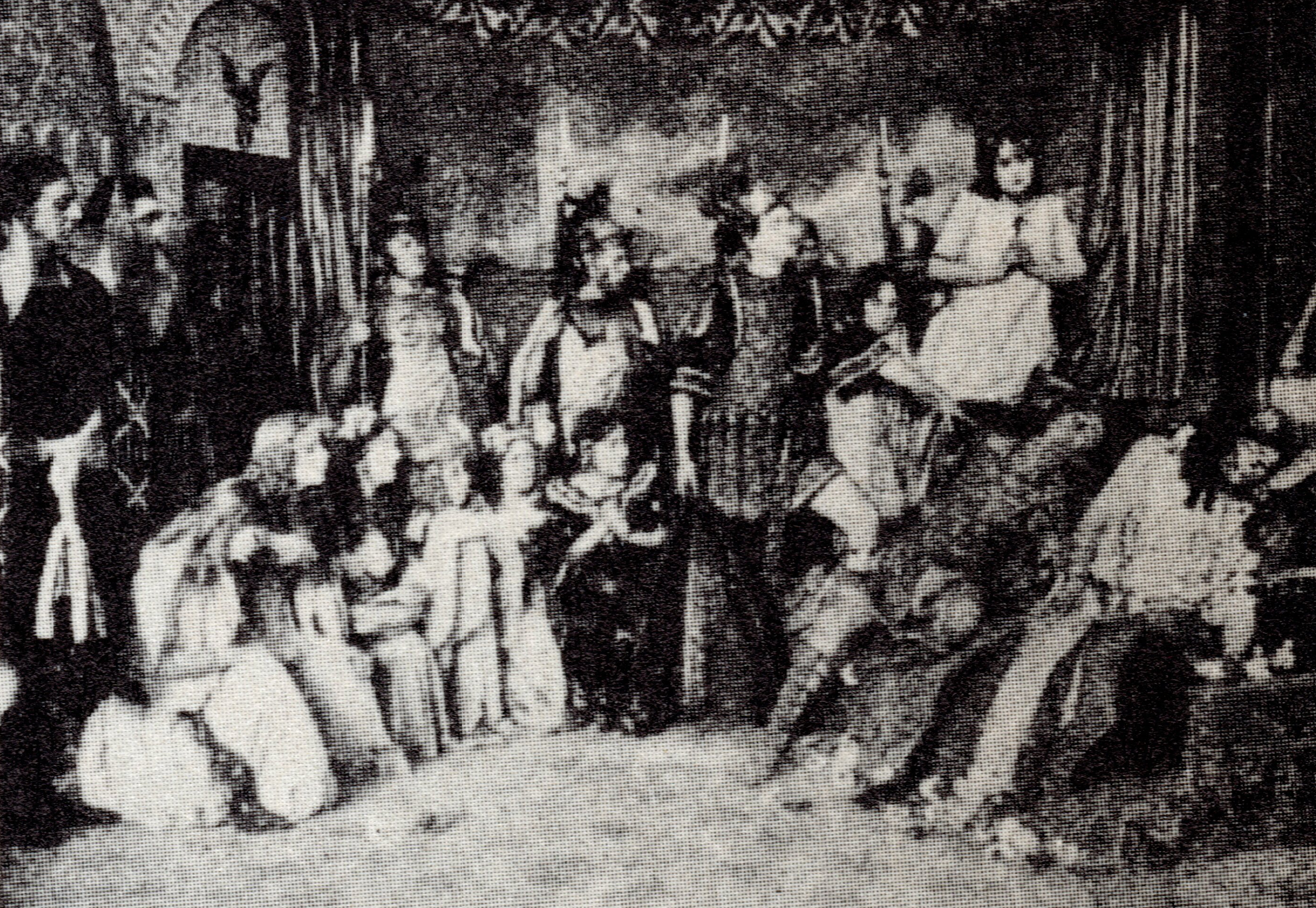
- Directed by: J. Stuart Blackton; Charles Kent
- Written by: William Shakespeare
- Produced by: J. Stuart Blackton
- Starring: Maurice Costello; Florence Lawrence
- Release date: November 3, 1908
- Running time: 1 reel (approximately 10 minutes)
- Country: United States
- Language: English

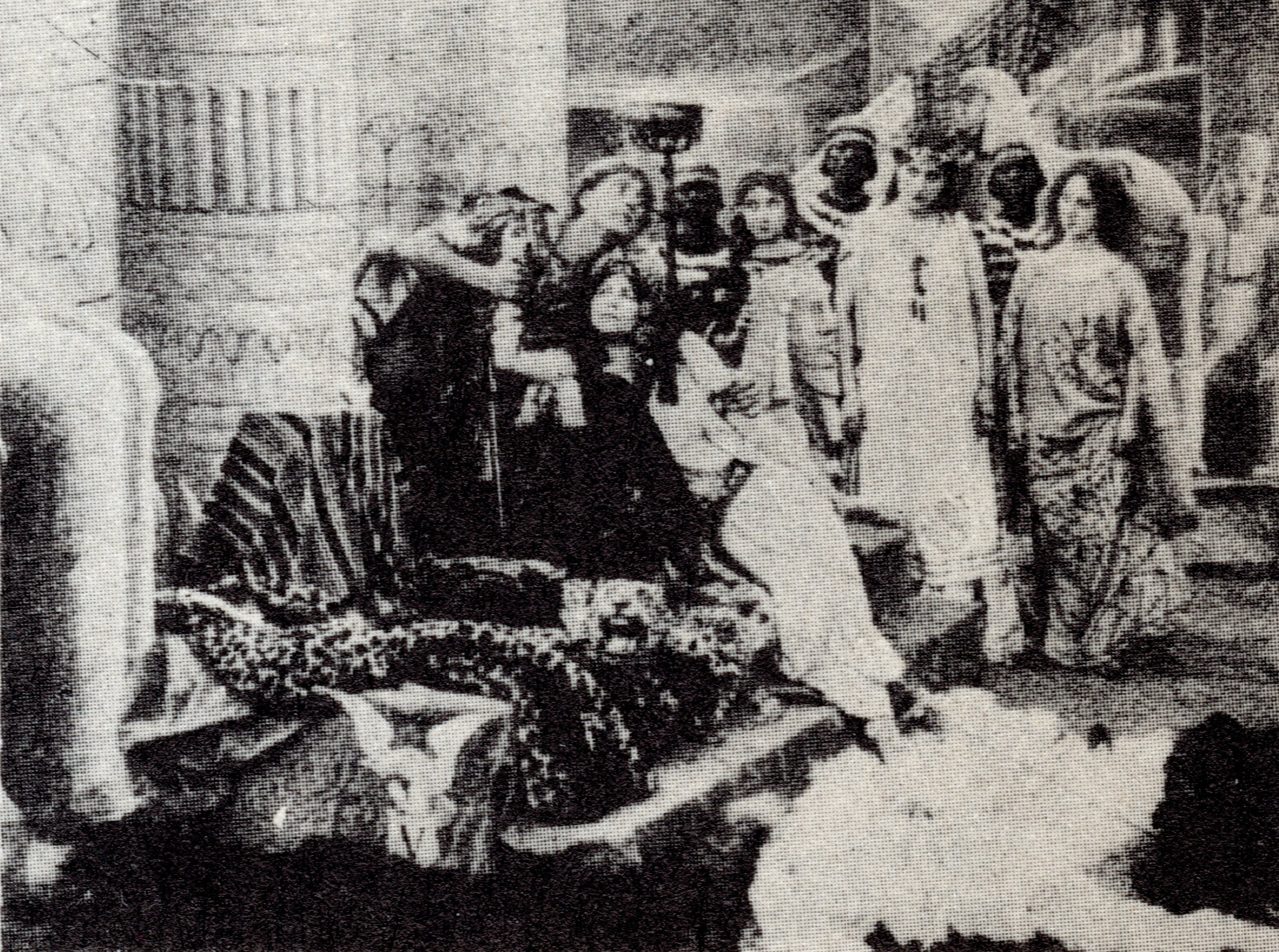
Maurice Costello and Florence Lawrence in Antony and Cleopatra (1908)

Antony and Cleopatra is a 1908 film directed by J. Stuart Blackton and Charles Kent and starring Maurice Costello and Florence Lawrence in the title roles, based on William Shakespeare's play of the same name. It was the first film to dramatize the ill-fated romance between Mark Antony and Cleopatra VII of Egypt. An earlier film by Méliès did depict Cleopatra, but on her own.

== Plot ==
The love affair between Mark Antony and Cleopatra and their defeat against Octavian at the Battle of Actium.

== Cast ==
- Maurice Costello as Marc Antony
- Florence Lawrence as Cleopatra
- William V. Ranous as Octavius Caesar
- Betty Kent as Cleopatra
- William Phillips as Octavius Caesar
- Charles Chapman as Mark Antony
