= William V. Ranous =

American actor and director

- Born: March 12, 1857; New York State
- Died: April 1, 1915 (aged 58); Santa Monica, California
- Occupations: Actor, film director
- Years active: 1907–1915
- Spouse(s): Doris Thompson; Inez Marcel

William V. Ranous (March 12, 1857 – April 1, 1915) was an American silent film actor and director and Shakespearean stage actor.

== Biography ==
William V. Ranous was born in New York State on March 12, 1857. He married writer and translator Dora Knowlton on May 28, 1881; he later married actress Inez Marcel.

Ranous appeared in 54 films between 1907 and 1915. He also directed 28 films between 1907 and 1913. He was the first director at Vitagraph Studios and also directed Hiawatha (1909), the first film produced by Carl Laemmle's Independent Moving Pictures Company. On Broadway, Ranous appeared in Quo Vadis (1900) and Romeo and Juliet (1903).

He died in Santa Monica on April 1, 1915.

== Selected filmography ==
- Macbeth (1908)
- Skinner's Finish (1908)
- Les Misérables (1909)
- The Voiceless Message (1911)
