= D. W. Griffith =

American filmmaker (1875–1948)

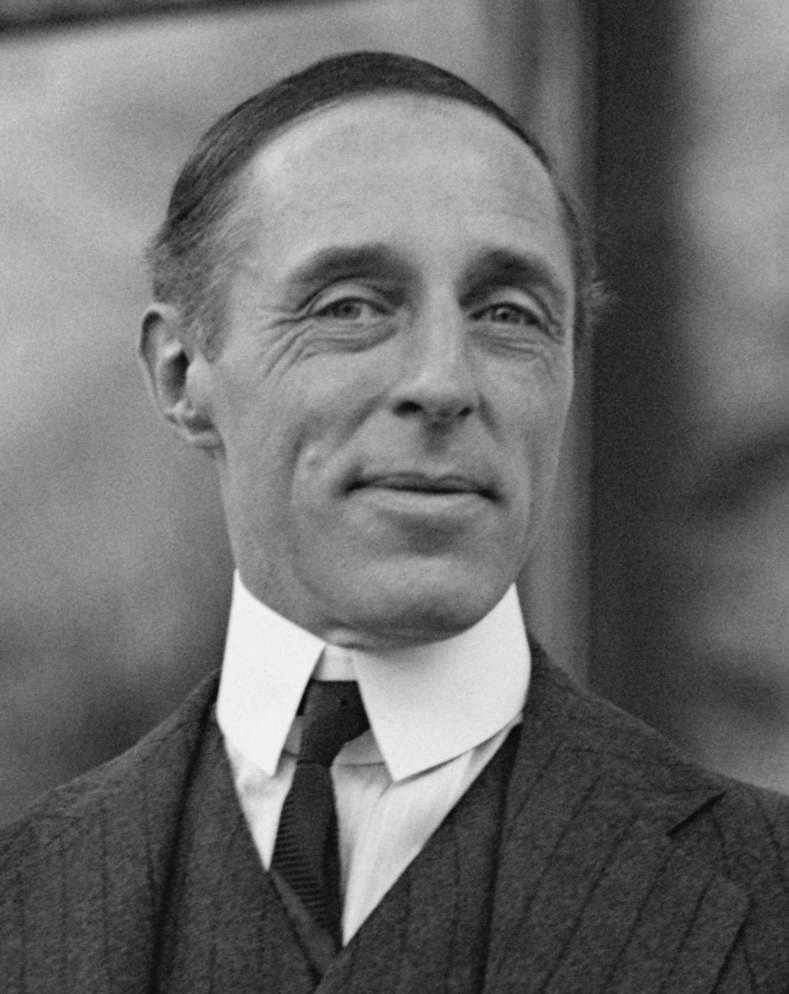
- Griffith in 1922
- Born: David Wark Griffith; January 22, 1875; Oldham County, Kentucky, U.S.
- Died: July 23, 1948 (aged 73); Los Angeles, California, U.S.
- Resting place: Mount Tabor Methodist Church Graveyard, Centerfield, Kentucky, U.S.
- Occupations: Film director; screenwriter; producer
- Years active: 1895–1931
- Spouses: Linda Arvidson (m. 1906; div. 1936) Evelyn Baldwin (m. 1936; div. 1947)

David Wark Griffith (January 22, 1875 – July 23, 1948) was an American film director. Considered one of the most influential figures in the history of the motion picture, he pioneered many aspects of film editing and expanded the art of the narrative film.

To modern audiences, Griffith is known primarily for directing the 1915 film The Birth of a Nation. One of the most financially successful films of all time and considered a landmark by film historians, it has also been denounced for its degrading portrayals of African Americans, its glorification of the Ku Klux Klan, and support for the Confederacy. The Ku Klux Klan's revival in the months that followed is partially attributed to the film's release. The film led to riots in several major cities all over the United States and the NAACP attempted to have it banned. Griffith made his next film Intolerance (1916) as an answer to critics, who he felt unfairly maligned his work.

Together with Charlie Chaplin, Mary Pickford, and Douglas Fairbanks, Griffith founded the studio United Artists in 1919 with the goal of enabling actors and directors to make films on their own terms, as opposed to the terms of commercial studios. Several of Griffith's later films were successful, including Broken Blossoms (1919), Way Down East (1920), and Orphans of the Storm (1921), but the high costs he incurred for production and promotion often led to commercial failure. He had made nearly 520 films, including nearly 480 short movies, by the time of The Struggle (1931), his final feature. All but three were completely silent.

== Early life ==
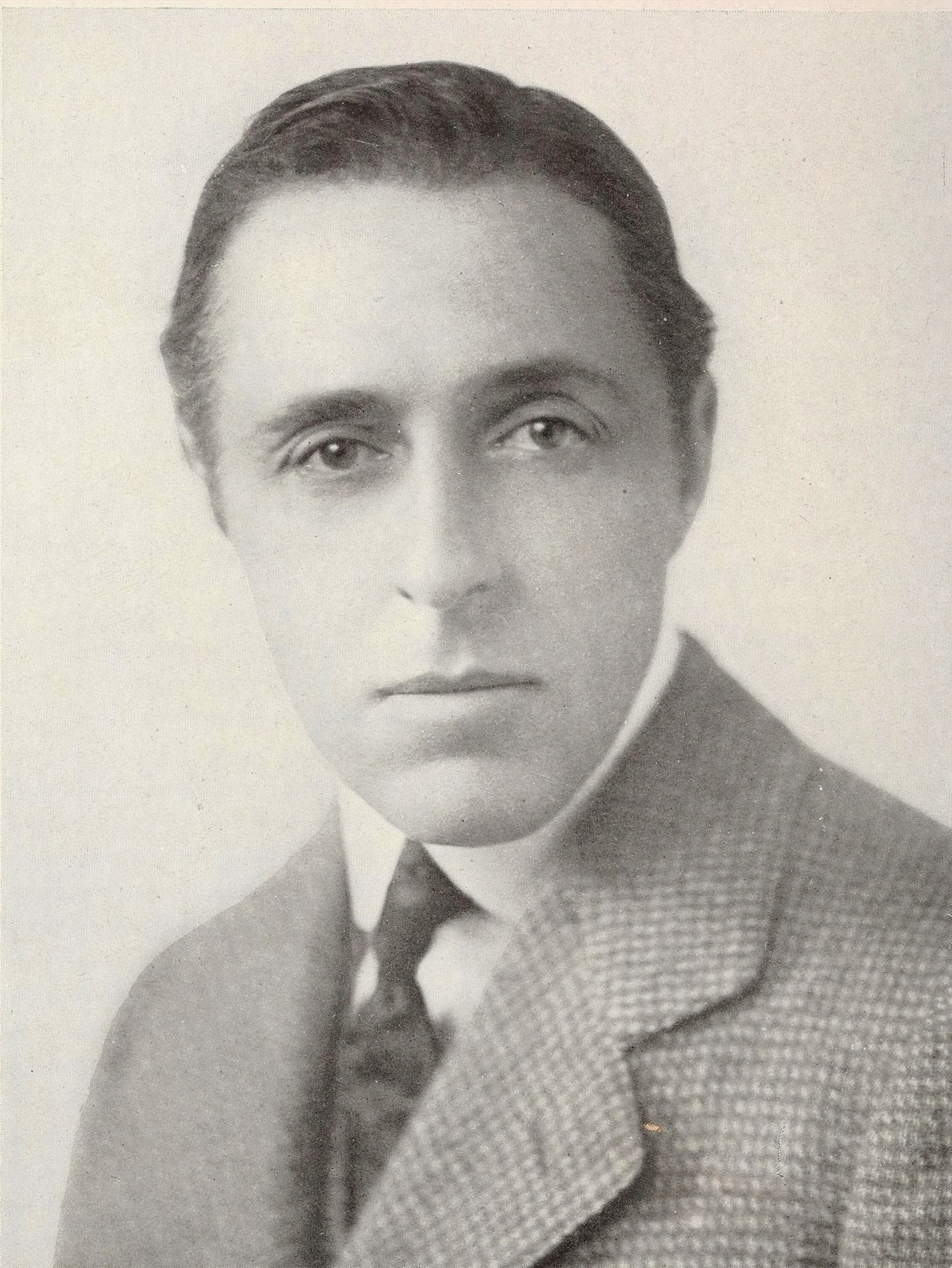
Griffith c. 1907

Griffith was born on January 22, 1875, on a farm in Oldham County, Kentucky, the son of Jacob Wark "Roaring Jake" Griffith, a Confederate army colonel in the American Civil War who was elected as a Kentucky state legislator, and Mary Perkins (née Oglesby). Griffith was raised as a Methodist, and he attended a one-room schoolhouse, where he was taught by his older sister Mattie. His father died when he was 10.

When Griffith was 14, his mother abandoned the farm and moved the family to Louisville, Kentucky; there she opened a boarding house, which was unsuccessful. Griffith then left high school to help support the family, taking a job in a dry goods store and later in a bookstore. He began his creative career as an actor in touring companies. Meanwhile, he was learning how to become a playwright, but he had little success. Only one of his plays was accepted for a performance. He traveled to New York City in 1907 in an attempt to sell a script to Edison Studios producer Edwin Porter; although Porter rejected the script, he gave Griffith an acting part in Rescued from an Eagle's Nest instead. As a result of this experience, Griffith decided to try his luck as an actor, and he appeared in many films as an extra.

== Early film career ==
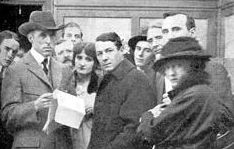
Griffith on the set of The Birth of a Nation (1915) with actor Henry B. Walthall and others

In 1908, Griffith accepted a role as a stage extra in Professional Jealousy for the American Mutoscope and Biograph Company, where he met cameraman Billy Bitzer. In 1908, Biograph's main director Wallace McCutcheon Sr. fell ill, and his son Wallace McCutcheon Jr. took his place. McCutcheon Jr. did not bring the studio success; Biograph co-founder Harry Marvin then gave Griffith the position, and he made the short The Adventures of Dollie. He directed nearly 200 films for the company during his first two years, 1908 and 1909.

Among the films he directed in 1909 was The Cricket on the Hearth, an adaptation of Charles Dickens's novel. Showing the influence of Dickens on his own film narrative, Griffith employed the technique of cross-cutting—where two stories run alongside each other, as seen in Dickens's novels such as Oliver Twist. When criticized by a cameraman for doing this technique in a later film, Griffith was said to have replied "Well, doesn't Dickens write that way?".

His short In Old California (1910) was the first film shot in Hollywood, California. Four years later, he produced and directed his first feature film Judith of Bethulia (1914). Biograph believed that longer features were not viable at this point. According to Lillian Gish, the company thought that "a movie that long would hurt [the audience's] eyes".

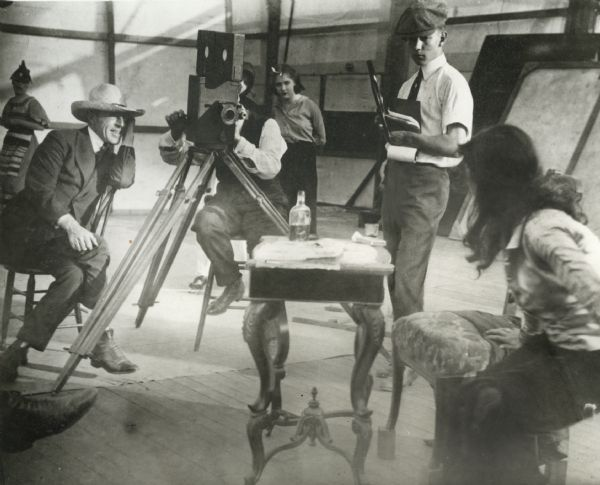
Left to right: Griffith, cameraman Billy Bitzer (behind Pathé camera), Dorothy Gish (watching from behind Bitzer), Karl Brown (keeping script) and Miriam Cooper (in profile) in a production still for Intolerance (1916)

Griffith left Biograph because of company resistance to his goals and his cost overruns on the film. He took his company of actors with him and joined the Mutual Film Corporation. There he co-produced The Life of General Villa, a silent biographical-action movie starring Pancho Villa as himself, shot on location in Mexico during a civil war. He formed a studio with Majestic Studios manager Harry Aitken, which became known as Reliance-Majestic Studios and later was renamed Fine Arts Studios. His new production company became an autonomous production unit partner in the Triangle Film Corporation along with Thomas H. Ince and Keystone Studios' Mack Sennett. The Triangle Film Corporation was headed by Aitken, who was released from the Mutual Film Corporation, and his brother Roy.

The Birth of a Nation (1915), by Griffith

Griffith directed and produced The Clansman through Reliance-Majestic Studios in 1915. The film later became known as The Birth of a Nation. It is considered the first Hollywood epic. The film was a success, but its depiction of slavery, the Ku Klux Klan, race relations in the American Civil War, and the Reconstruction era of the United States aroused much controversy. It was based on Thomas Dixon Jr.'s 1905 novel The Clansman: A Historical Romance of the Ku Klux Klan, which casts Southern slavery as benign, the enfranchisement of freedmen as a corrupt plot by the Republican Party, and the Ku Klux Klan as a band of heroes restoring the rightful order. This view of the era was popular at the time and was endorsed for decades by historians of the Dunning School, but it met with strong criticism from the National Association for the Advancement of Colored People (NAACP) and other groups.

The NAACP attempted to stop showings of the film. This ban was successful in some cities, but nonetheless it was shown widely and became the most successful box-office attraction of its time. It is considered among the first "blockbuster" motion pictures, and it broke all box-office records that had been established until then. "They lost track of the money it made", Lillian Gish remarked in a Kevin Brownlow interview.

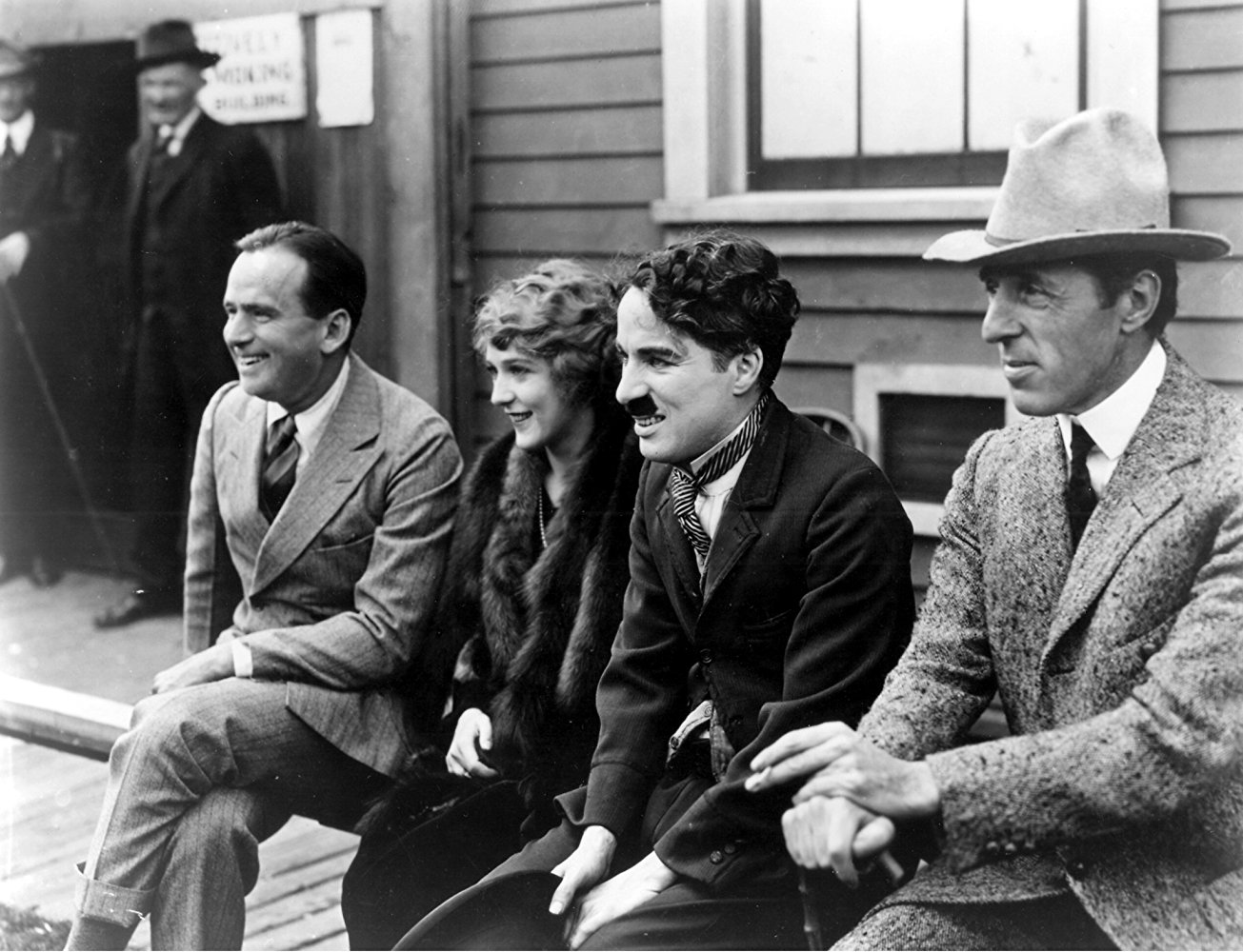
The first million-dollar partners: Fairbanks, Pickford, Chaplin and Griffith

Intolerance (1916), by Griffith

Audiences in some major northern cities rioted over the film's racial content and the violence. Griffith's indignation at efforts to censor or ban the film motivated him the following year to produce Intolerance, in which he portrayed the effects of intolerance in four different historical periods: the Fall of Babylon; the Crucifixion of Jesus; the events surrounding the St. Bartholomew's Day massacre (during religious persecution of French Huguenots); and a modern story. Intolerance was not a financial success; it did not bring in enough profits to cover the lavish road show that accompanied it. Griffith put a huge budget into the film's production that could not be recovered in its box office. He mostly financed Intolerance himself, which contributed to his financial ruin for the rest of his life.

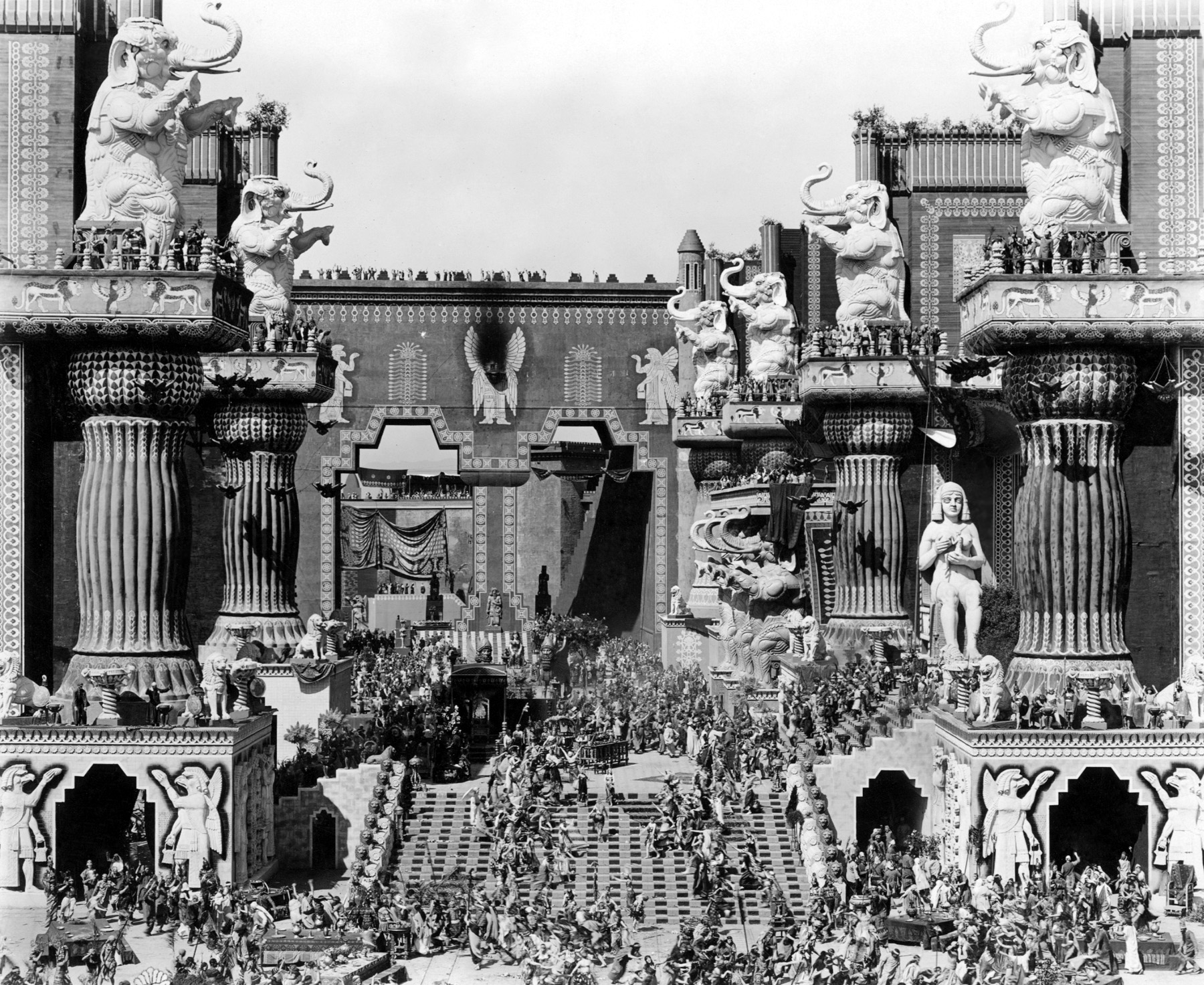
"Belshazzar's feast", one of the massive film sets in Intolerance (1916)

Griffith's production partnership was dissolved in 1917, and he went to Artcraft, part of Paramount Pictures, and then to First National Pictures (1919–1920). At the same time, he founded United Artists together with Charlie Chaplin, Mary Pickford, and Douglas Fairbanks; the studio was based on allowing actors to control their own interests rather than being dependent upon commercial studios.

Souvenir program from D.W. Griffith presentation of The Birth of a Nation

He continued to make films, but he never again achieved box-office grosses as high as either The Birth of a Nation or Intolerance.

== Later film career ==
Although United Artists survived as a company, Griffith's association with it was short-lived. While some of his later films did well at the box office, commercial success often eluded him. Griffith features from this period include Broken Blossoms (1919), Way Down East (1920), Orphans of the Storm (1921), Dream Street (1921), One Exciting Night (1922), The White Rose (1923), America (1924) and Isn't Life Wonderful (1924). Of these, the first three were successes at the box office. Griffith was forced to leave United Artists after Isn't Life Wonderful (1924) failed at the box office.

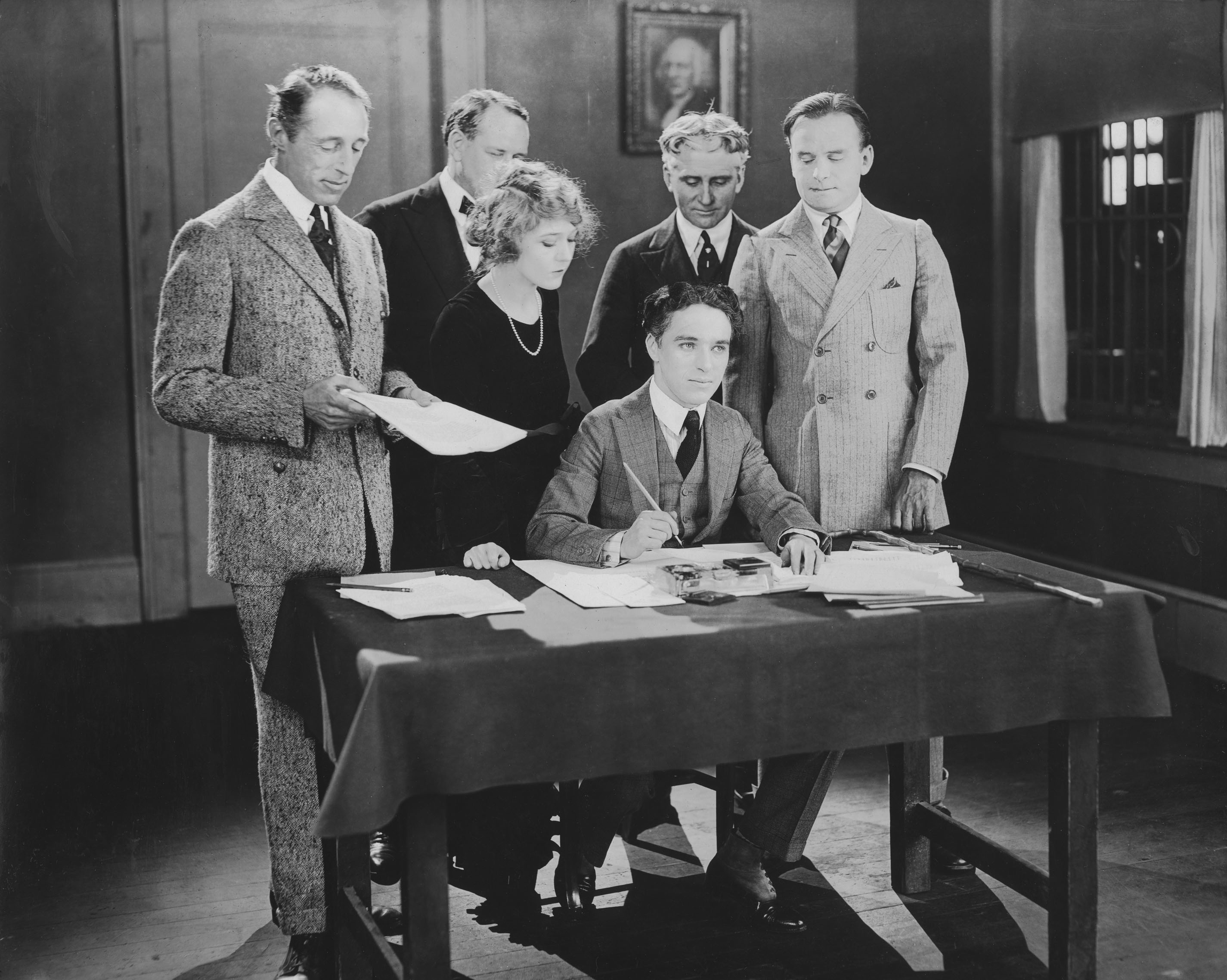
United Artists founders Griffith, Pickford, Chaplin and Fairbanks sign their contract for the cameras in 1919.

He made Lady of the Pavements (1929), a part sound film, and only two full-sound films: Abraham Lincoln (1930) and The Struggle (1931). As trends in filmmaking shifted, Griffith was unable to find work.

In 1936, director Woody Van Dyke, who had worked as Griffith's apprentice on Intolerance, asked Griffith to help him shoot the famous earthquake sequence for San Francisco, but Griffith was not given any film credit. Starring Clark Gable, Jeanette MacDonald and Spencer Tracy, it was the top-grossing film of the year.

In 1939, the producer Hal Roach hired Griffith to produce Of Mice and Men (1939) and One Million B.C. (1940). He wrote to Griffith: "I need help from the production side to select the proper writers, cast, et cetera, and to help me generally in the supervision of these pictures."

Although Griffith eventually disagreed with Roach over the production and departed, Roach later insisted that some of the scenes in the completed film were directed by Griffith. This movie was the final production in which Griffith was involved. However, cast members' accounts recall Griffith directing only the screen tests and costume tests. When Roach advertised the film in late 1939 with Griffith listed as producer, Griffith asked that his name be removed.

Griffith was for decades held in awe by many members of the film industry. He was presented with an honorary Oscar by the Academy of Motion Picture Arts and Sciences in 1936. In 1946, he made an impromptu visit to the film location of David O. Selznick's epic western Duel in the Sun, where some of his veteran actors—Lillian Gish, Lionel Barrymore and Harry Carey—were cast members. Gish and Barrymore found their mentor's presence distracting, and they became self-conscious; in response, Griffith hid behind the scenery when the two were filming their scenes.

== Death ==
On the morning of July 23, 1948, Griffith was discovered unconscious in the lobby at the Knickerbocker Hotel in Los Angeles, where he had been living alone. He died of a cerebral hemorrhage on the way to a Hollywood hospital. A public memorial service was held in his honor at the Hollywood Masonic Temple. He is buried at Mount Tabor Methodist Church Graveyard in Centerfield, Kentucky. In 1950, The Directors Guild of America provided a stone and bronze monument for his grave site.

== Legacy ==
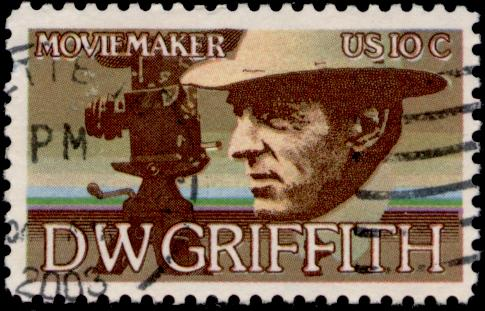
Stamp issued by the United States Postal Service in 1975 to commemorate the centennial of Griffith's birth

Griffith has a controversial legacy. Despite criticism, he was a widely celebrated and respected public figure during his life, and modern film historians continue to recognize him for his contributions to the craft of filmmaking. Nevertheless, many critics during his lifetime, as well as in the decades since his death, have characterized him and his work (most notably The Birth of a Nation) as upholding white supremacist ideals. Historians frequently cite The Birth of a Nation as a major factor in the KKK's revival in the 20th century, and it remains controversial to this day.

Performer and director Charlie Chaplin called Griffith "The Teacher of Us All". Filmmakers such as Alfred Hitchcock, Lev Kuleshov, Jean Renoir, Cecil B. DeMille, King Vidor, Victor Fleming, Raoul Walsh, Carl Theodor Dreyer, and Stanley Kubrick have praised Griffith. Sergei Eisenstein expressed his admiration for Griffith as an "outstanding master", but criticized Birth of a Nation, calling it "disgraceful propaganda of racial hatred towards the colored people".

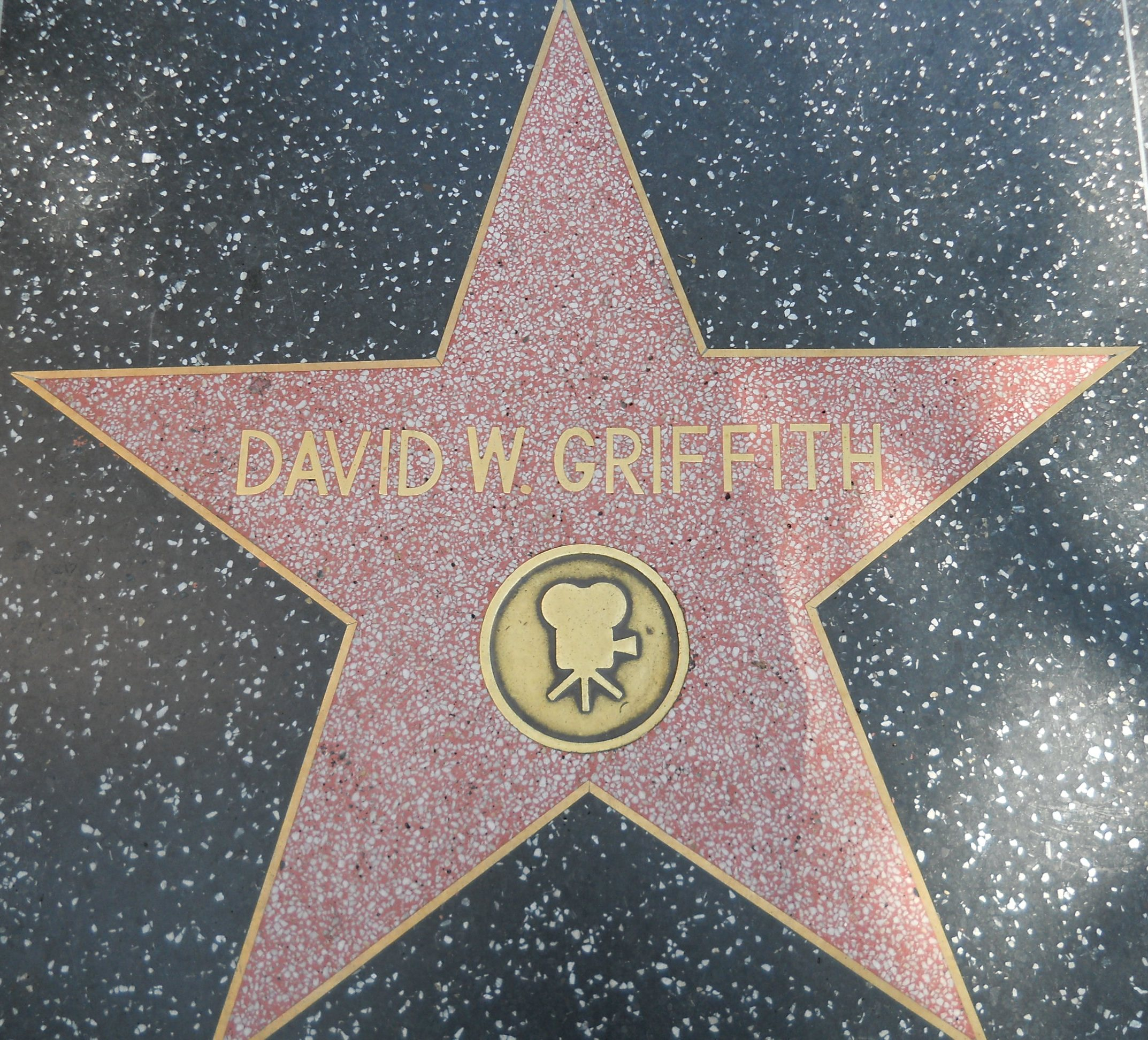
Griffith's star on the Hollywood Walk of Fame

Griffith seems to have been one of the first to understand how certain film techniques could be used to create an expressive language; it gained popular recognition with the release of The Birth of a Nation (1915). His early shorts —such as Biograph's The Musketeers of Pig Alley (1912), show that Griffith's attention to camera placement and lighting heightened mood and tension. In making Intolerance, Griffith opened new possibilities for the medium, creating a form that seems to owe more to music than to traditional narrative.

== Accolades and influence ==
- In the 1951 Philco Television Playhouse episode "The Birth of the Movies", events from Griffith's film career were depicted. Griffith was played by John Newland.
- In 1953, the Directors Guild of America (DGA) instituted the D. W. Griffith Award, its highest honor. However, on December 15, 1999, then DGA President Jack Shea and the DGA National Board announced that the award would be renamed as the "DGA Lifetime Achievement Award". They stated that, although Griffith was extremely talented, they felt his film The Birth of a Nation had "helped foster intolerable racial stereotypes", and that it was thus better not to have the top award in his name.
- On February 8, 1960, Griffith was posthumously awarded a star on the Hollywood Walk of Fame, which is located at 6535 Hollywood Boulevard.
- In 1975, Griffith was honored on a 10-cent postage stamp by the United States.
- The 1976 American comedy film Nickelodeon in part pays homage to silent film makers, and includes footage from The Birth of a Nation.
- D.W. Griffith Middle School in Los Angeles is named after Griffith.
- In 2008, the Hollywood Heritage Museum hosted a screening of Griffith's early films to commemorate the centennial of his start in film.
- On January 22, 2009, the Oldham History Center in La Grange, Kentucky, opened a 15-seat theatre in Griffith's honor. The theatre features a library of available Griffith films.
- In 2024, East West Players in Los Angeles produced Unbroken Blossoms, a world premier play by Philip W. Chung about the making of Broken Blossoms. Griffith was portrayed by actor Arye Gross.

== Film preservation ==
Griffith has six films preserved on the United States National Film Registry deemed as being "culturally, historically, or aesthetically significant": Lady Helen's Escapade, A Corner in Wheat (both 1909), The Musketeers of Pig Alley (1912), The Birth of a Nation (1915), Intolerance (1916) and Broken Blossoms (1919).

== See also ==
- D. W. Griffith House
- Griffith Ranch (in San Fernando, California)
- List of film directors who studied under D. W. Griffith
- List of Freemasons
- List of people from the Louisville metropolitan area
- Shōzō Makino - a Japanese film director entitled as the "Father of the Japanese film" liken to D. W. Griffith, and was nicknamed by Griffith as "Griffith Makino".
