= The Galley Slave =

The Galley Slave may refer to:

- The Galley Slave (1915 film)
- The Galley Slave (1919 film)
