= Clara Beranger =

American screenwriter

Clara S. Beranger
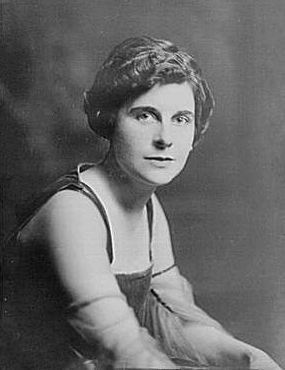
- Clara Beranger in 1918
- Born: Clara Strouse; January 14, 1886; Baltimore, Maryland, U.S.
- Died: September 10, 1956 (aged 70); Hollywood, California, U.S.
- Education: Goucher College (BA)
- Occupation: Screenwriter
- Spouse(s): Albert Berwanger (1907 – ?) William C. DeMille (m. 1928; died 1955)
- Children: 1

Clara Beranger (née Strouse; January 14, 1886 – September 10, 1956) was an American screenwriter of the silent film era and a member of the original faculty of the USC School of Cinematic Arts.

== Biography ==
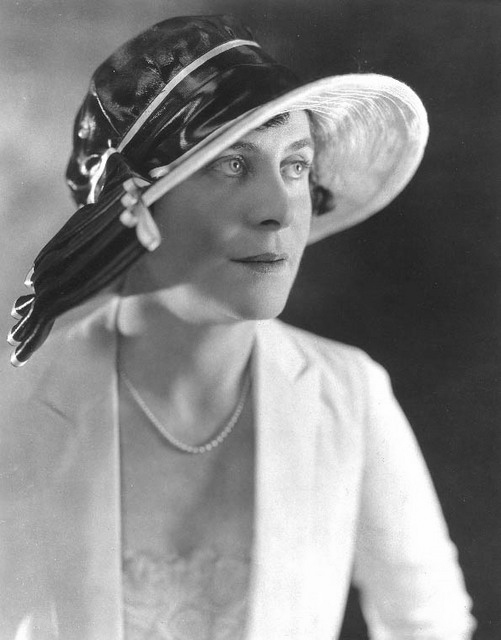
Clara Beranger, c. 1920s

Beranger was born Clara Strouse in Baltimore, Maryland, to Benjamin and Fannie (Kahn) Strouse. Her family was of German Jewish descent. Benjamin and his brothers had emigrated and opened a dry-goods store in Indiana.

After graduating from The Baltimore Women's College, now known as Goucher College, with a Bachelor of Arts degree in 1907, Clara moved to New York City and went into journalism, writing for various popular magazines and devoting time to study the stage. On October 23, 1907, she married Albert Berwanger, with whom she had a daughter, Frances Berwanger in 1909. When she began to write, Clara would change her name to Beranger.

=== Freelance ===
Using the pseudonym of Charles S. Beranger, her first screen employment was as a freelancer, writing for the Edison, Vitagraph and Kalem companies, to whom she furnished many originals as well as continuities. Her success attracted some attention and she was appointed as a staff writer for the Fox Corporation. She wrote several scripts for the popular child star Baby Marie Osborne as well as a much-praised adaptation of A Tale of Two Cities. Beranger also wrote The Interloper for Kitty Gordon, The Bluffer for June Elvidge and The Mirror for Marjorie Rambeau, though many of these films are considered lost. With Forrest Halsey, Beranger wrote the stage play His Chinese Wife, which received good reviews and became one of the successes of the 1919–1920 season.

=== Famous Players–Lasky ===
In 1921, Clara took Frances, then twelve, and migrated to Hollywood to write for motion pictures, where she signed a long contract with Cecil B. DeMille's Famous Players–Lasky; the outfit with whom she is most associated. She wrote or contributed to more than 24 DeMille productions, and produced both Come Out of the Kitchen and Girls for Marguerite Clark; Sadie Love and Wanted: A Husband for Billie Burke; Judy of Rogue's Harbor for Mary Miles Minter; The Fear Market for Alice Brady; The Cost for Violet Heming; Half an Hour for Dorothy Dalton; Civilian Clothes for Thomas Meighan, Notoriety for Bebe Daniels, and the classic Dr. Jekyll and Mr. Hyde for John Barrymore.

From an interview with Louella Parson in 1922:

I will be out in California when Mr. DeMille begins operations. Under my old contract I furnished eight continuities a year; now that I work only for William DeMille I only write four. That gives me an opportunity to see my work through from the story to the screen. It makes it possible for me to go over my script scene by scene with the producer, so he can make the picture with almost no changes. In the old days I had to keep my nose to the grindstone continually so as to finish the eight pictures in time for the different directors for whom I was writing.

=== William DeMille ===
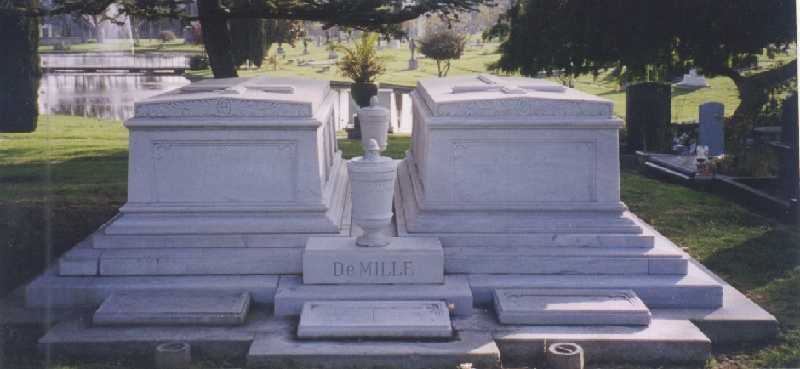
DeMille tomb at Hollywood Forever Cemetery

In 1921 Beranger met her future husband William DeMille and work on the adaptation of Miss Lulu Bett, the Pulitzer Prize-winning play about a young woman who discovers that she's married to a man who is already married. Not as famous today as Cecil, and though most of his silents have been lost, William is still considered one of the silents' most respected directors. Miss Lulu Bett shows a delicate touch in the telling of an impoverished spinster's misfortunes in a small town.

William had other affairs including Lorna Moon who had borne him a son out of wedlock, and with another screenwriter, Olga Printzlau; but he genuinely fell in love with Clara who had tolerated it all. In June 1926, William to the surprise of his wife, announced that he wanted a divorce. Anna refused him and took their daughters, Agnes and Margaret, to Europe for a long trip. When the family returned, William announced that he had given up Beranger and would try again with his wife, but this arrangement only lasted about a year. Anna never recovered from the divorce, and took the children to live in New York permanently. William DeMille (50) and Clara Beranger (42) would be married in Albuquerque, New Mexico on August 14, 1928 in the drawing room aboard "The Chief", a transcontinental special train. William de Mille states that Beranger wrote all of his screen plays from 1921 - 1928. He writes in his book, Hollywood Saga; "In April, 1928, I had just finished 'Tenth Avenue,' my forty - fifth production and was working on 'Craig's Wife' with Clara Beranger, who had written the screen plays of all my pictures for seven years and continued to do so even after our marriage." .

After marrying into the DeMille dynasty, Beranger would continue to write, including Craig's Wife (1928) for Irene Rich and This Mad World (1930) for Kay Johnson. William would lose everything in the Depression and unhappily rely on Beranger to support him, until Beranger asked Cecil DeMille to employ him to write scenarios.

=== USC School of Cinematic Arts ===
Baranger would retire from writing pictures in 1934, though she remained a frequent contributor to magazines such as Liberty and Good Housekeeping, and writer of inspirational books. Beranger's largest impact would be as one of the original faculty of USC School of Cinematic Arts which had begun in 1929 as a collaboration between the University of Southern California and Academy of Motion Picture Arts and Sciences. Also among the original faculty were actors Douglas Fairbanks and Mary Pickford, directors D.W. Griffith and Ernst Lubitsch, and producers Irving Thalberg and Darryl Zanuck. Cecil would endow the Drama Department, to which William would be appointed as Director, at last allowing him to exploit his education and skills as a teacher and director.

Beranger was a large proponent of the idea that Hollywood had a responsibility to teach the next generation of artists, and would write a much-used text Writing for the Screen in 1950 and continue to lecture on screenwriting for the rest of her life. She suffered a heart attack and died in 1956.

== Filmography ==
- Memories of His Youth (1913, scenario)
- The Master Mind (1914, scenario)
- Cameo Kirby (1914, uncredited)
- The Galley Slave (1915, scenario)
- Princess Romanoff (1915, scenario)
- From the Valley of the Missing (1915, scenario)
- Anna Karenina (1915, writer)
- Her Mother's Secret (1915/I, scenario, uncredited)
- Mary Moreland (1917)
- The Mirror (1917)
- The Slave Market (1917, scenario)
- The Greater Woman (1917, unconfirmed)
- The Dormant Power (1917, writer)
- The Debt (1917, writer)
- Motherhood (1917/I, writer)
- The Golden Wall (1918)
- The Interloper (1918)
- Appearance of Evil (1918, scenario)
- Winning Grandma (1918, scenario)
- The Way Out (1918, scenario)
- Milady o' the Beanstalk (1918, scenario)
- The Voice of Destiny (1918, screenplay)
- The Love Net (1918, writer)
- By Hook or Crook (1918, writer)
- The Beloved Blackmailer (1918, writer)
- Dolly Does Her Bit (1918, writer)
- The Grouch (1918, scenario)
- The Little Intruder (1919)
- The Hand Invisible (1919)
- Heart of Gold (1919)
- The Praise Agent (1919, scenario)
- Phil for Short (1919, scenario)
- Hit or Miss (1919, scenario)
- The Unveiling Hand (1919, scenario)
- The Bluffer (1919, screenplay)
- Dust of Desire (1919, story, writer)
- Wanted: A Husband (1919, writer)
- Sadie Love (1919, writer)
- Bringing Up Betty (1919, writer)
- The Firing Line (1919, writer)
- Girls (1919, writer)
- Come Out of the Kitchen (1919, writer)
- Half an Hour (1920)
- White Youth (1920, story)
- Flames of the Flesh (1920, story)
- Blackbirds (1920, writer)
- Civilian Clothes (1920, writer)
- The Cost (1920, writer)
- Judy of Rogue's Harbor (1920, writer)
- The Fear Market (1920, writer)
- Dr. Jekyll and Mr. Hyde (1920)
- Miss Lulu Bett (1921, adaptation)
- Exit the Vamp (1921, screenplay, story)
- The Gilded Lily (1921, story)
- The Wonderful Thing (1921, writer)
- A Heart to Let (1921, writer)
- Sheltered Daughters (1921, writer)
- Her Husband's Trademark (1922, story)
- Clarence (1922, writer)
- Nice People (1922, writer)
- Bought and Paid For (1922, writer)
- Grumpy (1923, adaptation, screenplay)
- The World's Applause (1923, screenplay, story)
- Don't Call It Love (1923, writer)
- The Marriage Maker (1923, writer)
- Only 38 (1923, writer)
- The Bedroom Window (1924, screenplay, story)
- The Fast Set (1924, writer)
- Icebound (1924, writer)
- Locked Doors (1925, screenplay, story)
- New Brooms (1925, writer)
- Lost: A Wife (1925, writer)
- Men and Women (1925, writer)
- Don Juan's Three Nights (1926, writer)
- Nobody's Widow (1927, adaptation)
- The Forbidden Woman (1927, adaptation, screenplay)
- The Little Adventuress (1927, adaptation, screenplay)
- Almost Human (1927, screenplay, titles)
- Craig's Wife (1928, adaptation)
- The Idle Rich (1929, writer)
- This Mad World (1930, adaptation, screenplay)
- His Double Life (1933, adaptation)
- Social Register (1934, writer)

== Bibliography ==
- You Can Be Happy. NY:Samuel Curl (1946)
- Writing for the Screen. Dubuque, Iowa:Wm. C. Brown Company (1950)
- Peace Begins at Home. Lee's Summit, MO:Unity School of Christianity (1954)
