= The Broken Silence =

1922 film

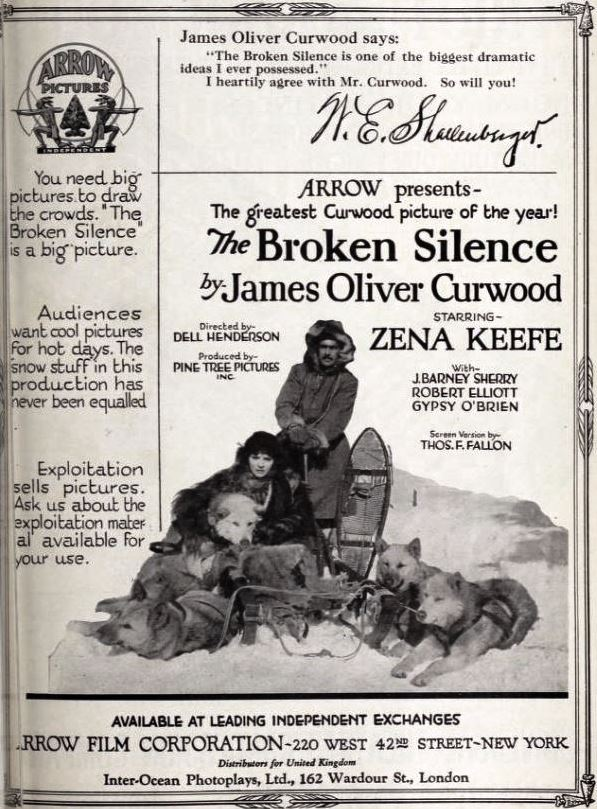

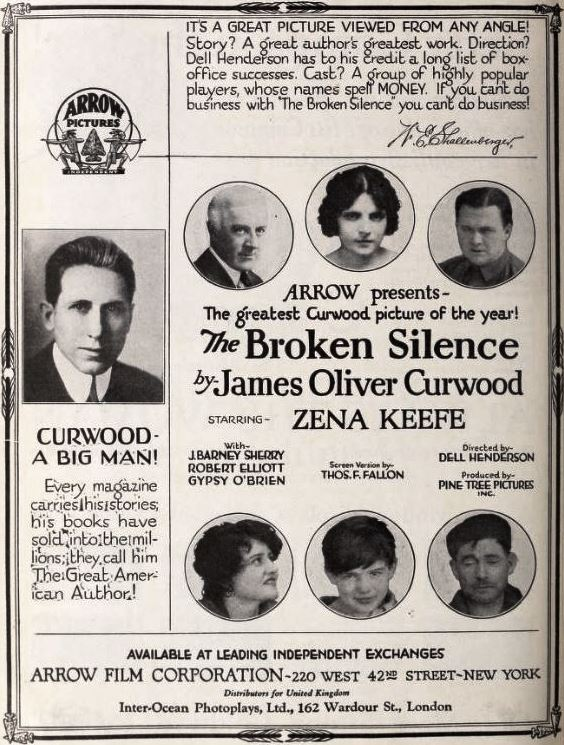

The Broken Silence is a feature-length 1922 American film. An adaptation of a short story by James Oliver Curwood, it was directed by Dell Henderson for Pine Tree Pictures productions, and distributed by Arrow Film Corp. The Broken Silence is a melodrama love story involving a murder and devoted siblings, set in Canada's Northwest. Thomas F. Fallon adapted the screenplay.

== Premise ==
A brother and sister posing as husband and wife to gel in as a normal couple in the Canadian Northwest are suspects in the murder of an inspector, who had killed their parents. Thinking that his sister has killed the inspector, the brother confesses to the crime to protect her, but she isn't the real culprit.

== Cast ==
- Zena Keefe as Jeanne Marat
- Robert Elliott as Bruce Cameron
- J. Barney Sherry as Inspector Brandt
- Jack Hopkins as Pierre Marat
- Jack Drumier as Indian Joe

== Reception ==
TV Guide noted that "With the possible exception of Zena Keefe, a former ingenue with the pioneering Vitagraph company, and veteran character actor J. Barney Sherry, The Broken Silence featured a cast of complete unknowns."

== Bibliography ==
- Munden, Kenneth White. The American Film Institute Catalog of Motion Pictures Produced in the United States, Part 1. University of California Press, 1997.
