= Florence Lee =

Florence Lee can refer to:

- Florence Lee (born 1864), American actress
- Florence Lee (born 1888), American actress
