= Oscar Apfel =

American film actor, producer, and screenwriter (1878–1938)

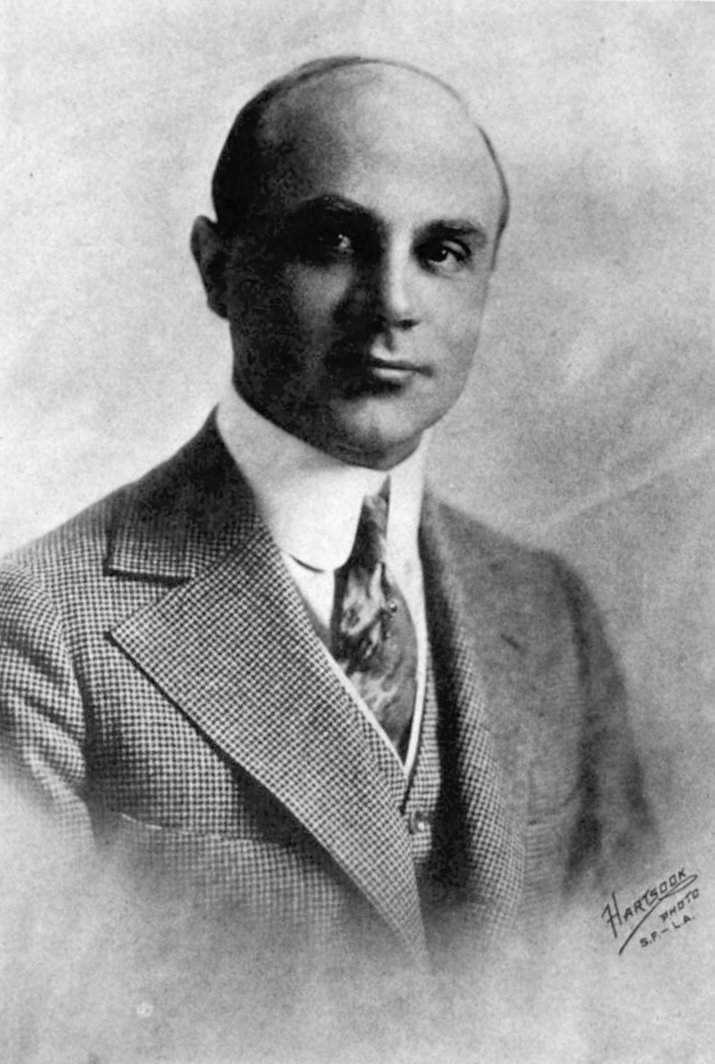
- Photo of Apfel from The First One Hundred Noted Men and Women of the Screen (1920)
- Born: January 17, 1878; Cleveland, Ohio, U.S.
- Died: March 21, 1938 (aged 60); Hollywood, U.S.
- Occupations: Actor, director, producer, screenwriter
- Years active: 1913–1938

Oscar C. Apfel (January 17, 1878 – March 21, 1938) was an American film actor, director, screenwriter, and producer. He appeared in more than 160 films between 1913 and 1939, and also directed 94 films between 1911 and 1927.

== Biography ==
Apfel was born in Cleveland, Ohio. After a number of years in commerce, he decided to adopt the stage as a profession. He secured his first professional engagement in 1900, in his hometown. He rose rapidly and soon held a position as director and producer, and was at the time noted as being the youngest stage director in America. He spent 11 years on the stage on Broadway, then joined the Edison Manufacturing Company. Apfel first directed for Thomas A. Edison, Inc. in 1911–12, where he made the innovative short film The Passer-By (1912). He also did some experimental work at Edison's laboratory in Orange, on the Edison Talking Pictures devices.

=== Lasky ===
When Apfel left the Edison company, he joined Reliance-Majestic Studios, remaining with them 18 months. In 1913, he became one of two main directors for the Jesse Laskyn Feature Play Company, the other being Cecil B. DeMille. All the first Lasky pictures were produced under his direction. Among these were the notable successes The Squaw Man, Brewster's Millions, The Master Mind, The Only Son, The Ghost Breaker, The Man on the Box, The Circus Man, and Cameo Kirby.

Apfel's directorial collaboration with DeMille was a crucial element in the development of DeMille's filmmaking technique.

=== Fox ===
In late 1914, Apfel left the Lasky Company and directed for various companies into the 1920s. His first move was to the producing staff of the William Fox Corporation, where he directed a series of pictures in which William Farnum starred. Some of these were A Soldier's Oath, Fighting Blood, The End of the Trail, The Battle of Hearts, and A Man of Sorrow.

=== Paralta ===
For the Paralta Company, where Apfel went after leaving the Fox Corporation, he produced Peter Kyne's A Man's a Man and The Turn of a Card in which J. Warren Kerrigan starred.

=== Armenian relief ===
Ravished Armenia (1919) (also known as Auction of Souls), a public-awareness picture for the Armenian Relief Committee, was Apfel's work. This production commanded wide attention and attracted great crowds at the special showings, which took place at the Plaza and other prominent hotels. The sympathetic interest evoked by its revelations helped in materially adding to the large sums that were subscribed to this cause.

A series of pictures for the World Film Corporation, starring Kitty Gordon, Montague Love, June Elvidge, Louise Huff, and Evelyn Greeley, was also among Apfel's successful productions.

=== Final years ===
After many years as a director, he gradually returned to acting. On March 21, 1938, Apfel died in Hollywood from a heart attack.

== Selected filmography ==
=== Actor ===
- The Texan (1930) as Thacker
- Abraham Lincoln (1930) as Secretary of War Stanton
- The Spoilers (1930) as A. Struve
- Liliom (1930) as Stefen Kadar (uncredited)
- The Virtuous Sin (1930) as Maj. Ivanoff
- Huckleberry Finn (1931) as The King
- Five Star Final (1931) as Bernard Hinchecliffe
- Sidewalks of New York (1931) as Judge
- The Yellow Ticket (1931) as British Embassy Butler (uncredited)
- The Woman from Monte Carlo (1932) as Dr. Rabeouf
- Speak Easily (1932) as Lawyer's Representative (uncredited)
- A Successful Calamity (1932) as President of the United States
- Make Me a Star (1932) as Henshaw
- False Faces (1932) as Fineberg
- High Pressure (1932) as Mr. Hackett
- Call Her Savage (1932) as Doctor Treating Crosby (uncredited)
- Rasputin and the Empress (1932) as Undetermined Secondary Role (uncredited)
- Employees' Entrance (1933) as Board of Directors Member #5 (uncredited)
- Gabriel Over the White House (1933) as German Delegate to Debt Conference (uncredited)
- The Story of Temple Drake (1933) as District Attorney (uncredited)
- Storm at Daybreak (1933) as Counselor Velasch (uncredited)
- Tugboat Annie (1933) as Reynolds (uncredited)
- One Man's Journey (1933) as John Radford
- The Bowery (1933) as Ivan Rummel
- The World Changes (1933) as Mr. Morley
- The House of Rothschild (1934) as Prussian Officer
- Whirlpool (1934) as Newspaper Editor
- Manhattan Melodrama (1934) as Speaker of Assembly (uncredited)
- The Old Fashioned Way (1934) as Mr. Livingston (uncredited)
- Bordertown (1935) as Judge Rufus Barnswell (uncredited)
- Romance in Manhattan (1935) as The Judge
- Dante's Inferno (1935) as Mr. Williams (uncredited)
- Man on the Flying Trapeze (1935) as President Malloy
- O'Shaughnessy's Boy (1935) as Martha's Lawyer
- Sutter's Gold (1936) as Bartender (uncredited)
- Hearts in Bondage (1936) as Capt. Gilman
- San Francisco (1936) as Founders' Club Member (uncredited)
- Crack-Up (1936) as Alfred Knuxton
- The Toast of New York (1937) as Wallack (uncredited)
- Fifty Roads to Town (1937) as Smorgen
- Conquest (1937) as Count Potocka (uncredited)
- Angel of Mercy (1939, Short) as Red Cross Representative (uncredited)

=== Director ===
- The Bells (1913)
- The Squaw Man (1914)
- The Master Mind (1914)
- The Man on the Box (1914)
- After Five (1915)
- The Little Gypsy (1915)
- The Battle of Hearts (1916)
- The Hidden Children (1917)
- The Turn of a Card (1918)
- The Rough Neck (1919)
- Ravished Armenia (1919)
- Phil for Short (1919)
- Ten Nights in a Bar Room (1921)
- Bulldog Drummond (1922)
- The Sporting Chance (1925)
- The Thoroughbred (1925)
- The Last Alarm (1926)
- Somebody's Mother (1926)
