= Painting the Town =

1927 film

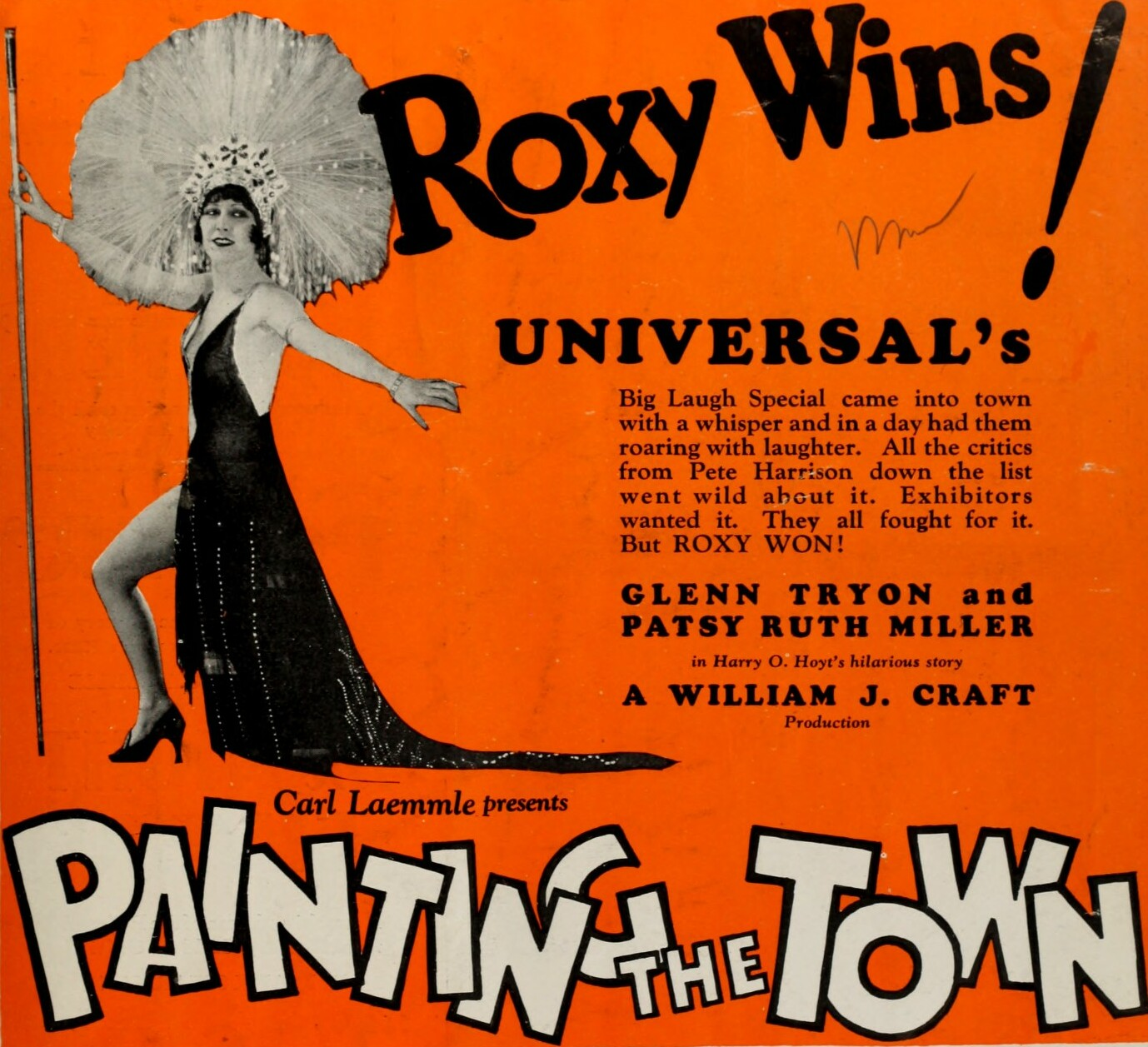
- Advertisement
- Directed by: William James Craft
- Screenplay by: Harry O. Hoyt; Vin Moore; Albert DeMond
- Story by: Harry O. Hoyt
- Starring: Glenn Tryon; Patsy Ruth Miller; Charles K. Gerrard; George Fawcett
- Cinematography: Alan Jones
- Edited by: Charles Craft
- Production company: Universal Pictures
- Distributed by: Universal Pictures
- Release date: August 7, 1927
- Running time: 60 minutes
- Country: United States
- Language: Silent (English intertitles)

Painting the Town is a 1927 American silent comedy film directed by William James Craft and written by Vin Moore and Albert DeMond based on a story by Harry O. Hoyt. The film stars Glenn Tryon, Patsy Ruth Miller, Charles K. Gerrard, George Fawcett, Sidney Bracey, and Max Asher. The film was released on August 7, 1927, by Universal Pictures. A print of Painting the Town exists in a private collection.

== Cast ==
- Glenn Tryon as Hector Whitmore
- Patsy Ruth Miller as Patsy Deveau
- Charles K. Gerrard as Raymond Tyson
- George Fawcett as Fire Commissioner
- Sidney Bracey as Secretary
- Max Asher as Wilson
- Monte Collins as Justice of the Peace
