= Joseph W. Smiley =

American actor

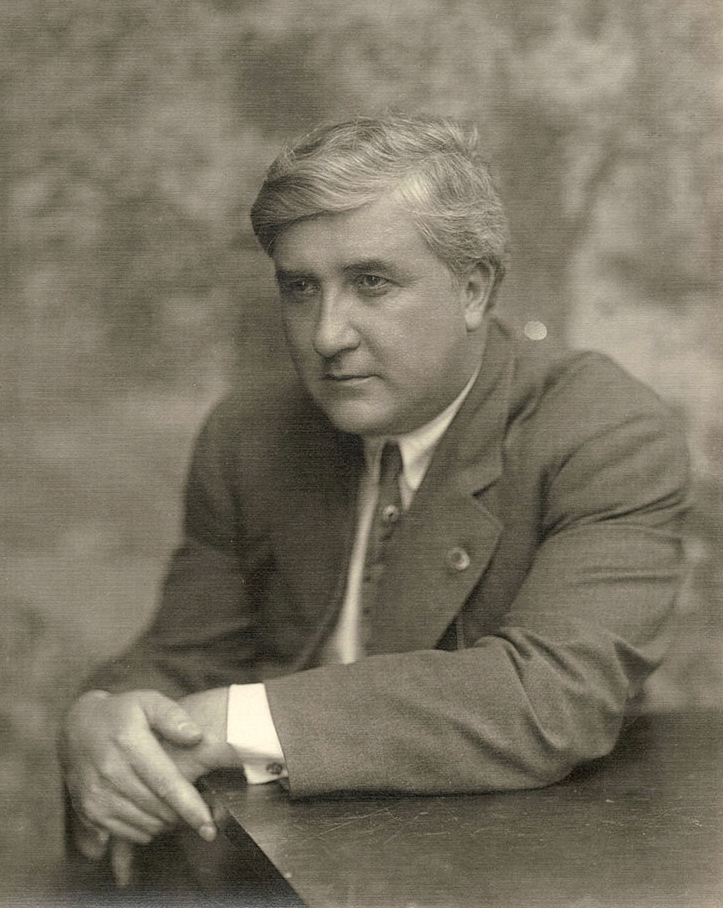
- Smiley, ca. 1913
- Born: June 18, 1870; Boston, Massachusetts, US
- Died: December 2, 1945 (aged 75); New York, New York
- Occupations: Actor and director
- Years active: 1911–1931
- Spouse: Lila Leslie (1914-?)

Joseph W. Smiley (born June 18, 1870, in Boston, Massachusetts) was an actor and director in the United States. His films include The Gray Horror (1915), The Other Sister (1915) and The Living Fear (1914), as well as many other films. He was married to the Scottish actress Lila Leslie. He died on December 2, 1945, in New York City, New York, USA.

His brother was actor Charles H. Smiley (1864-1925).

== Partial filmography ==
- The Scarlet Letter (1911) (directed)
- Threads of Destiny (1914)
- Life Without Soul (1915) (directed)
- Energetic Eva (1916) (directed)
- Broadway Jones (1917)
- Sleeping Fires (1917)
- Public Be Damned (1917)
- The Lesson (1917)
- Double Crossed (1917)
- Seven Keys to Baldpate (1917)
- Joan of Plattsburg (1918)
- Her Final Reckoning (1918)
- The Heart of a Girl (1918)
- The Face in the Dark (1918)
- The Road to France (1918)
- Heart of the Wilds (1918)
- Hitting the Trail (1918)
- Never Say Quit (1919)
- The Isle of Conquest (1919)
- Luck and Pluck (1919)
- As a Man Thinks (1919)
- A Daughter of Two Worlds (1920)
- The Law of the Yukon (1920)
- The Wild Goose (1921)
- The Woman God Changed (1921)
- The Scarab Ring (1921)
- Experience (1921)
- The Face in the Fog (1922)
- The Blonde Vampire (1922)
- Old Home Week (1925)
- The Police Patrol (1925)
- Wild, Wild Susan (1925)
- The Untamed Lady (1926)
- Aloma of the South Seas (1926)
- The Show-Off (1926)
- The Potters (1927)
