= His Greatest Sacrifice =

1921 film by J. Gordon Edwards

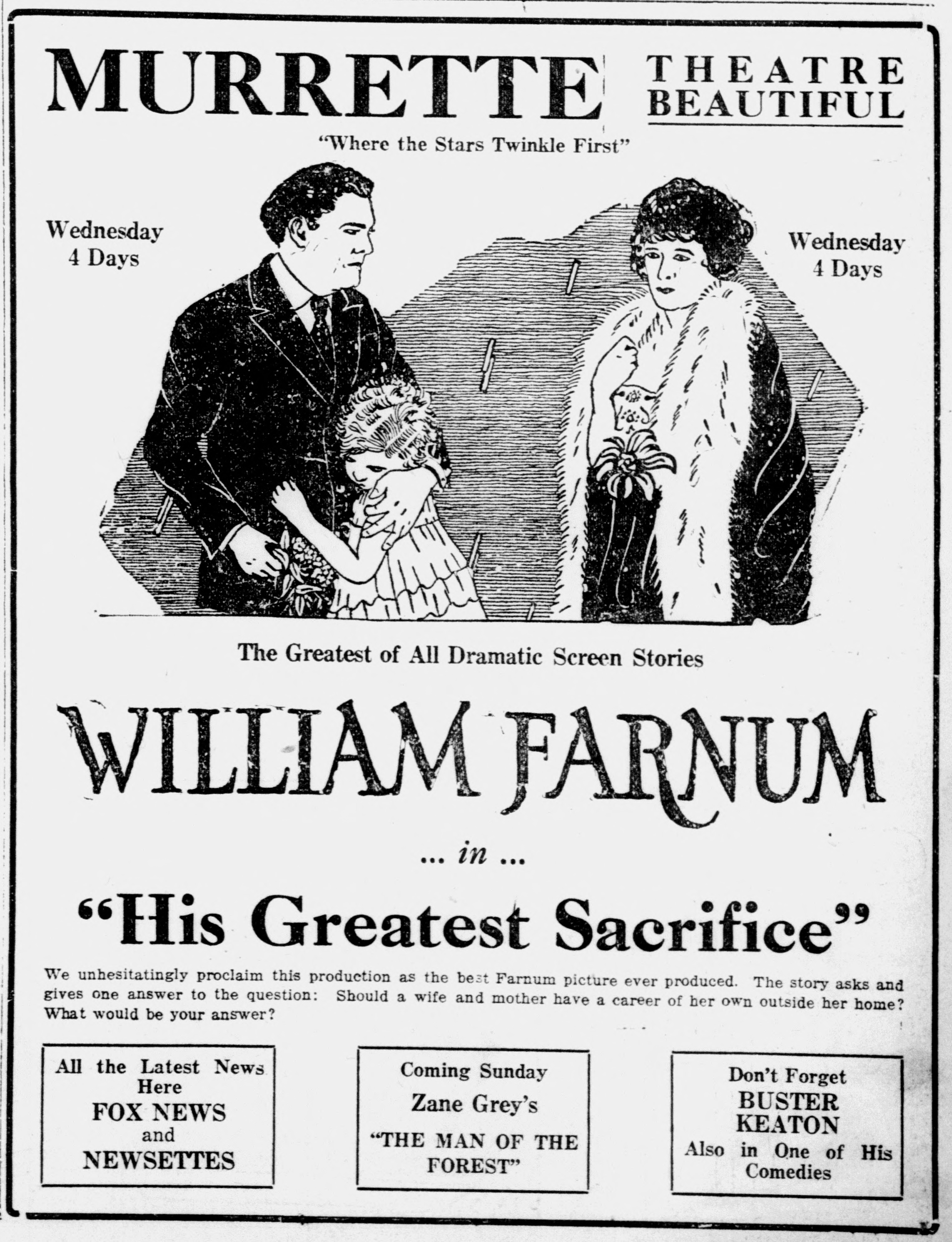
- Contemporary advertisement
- Directed by: J. Gordon Edwards
- Screenplay by: Paul Sloane
- Starring: William Farnum; Alice Fleming; Lorna Volare; Evelyn Greeley; Frank Goldsmith; Charles Wellesley
- Cinematography: Harry Leslie Keepers
- Production company: Fox Film Corporation
- Distributed by: Fox Film Corporation
- Release date: April 17, 1921
- Running time: 70 minutes
- Country: United States
- Language: English

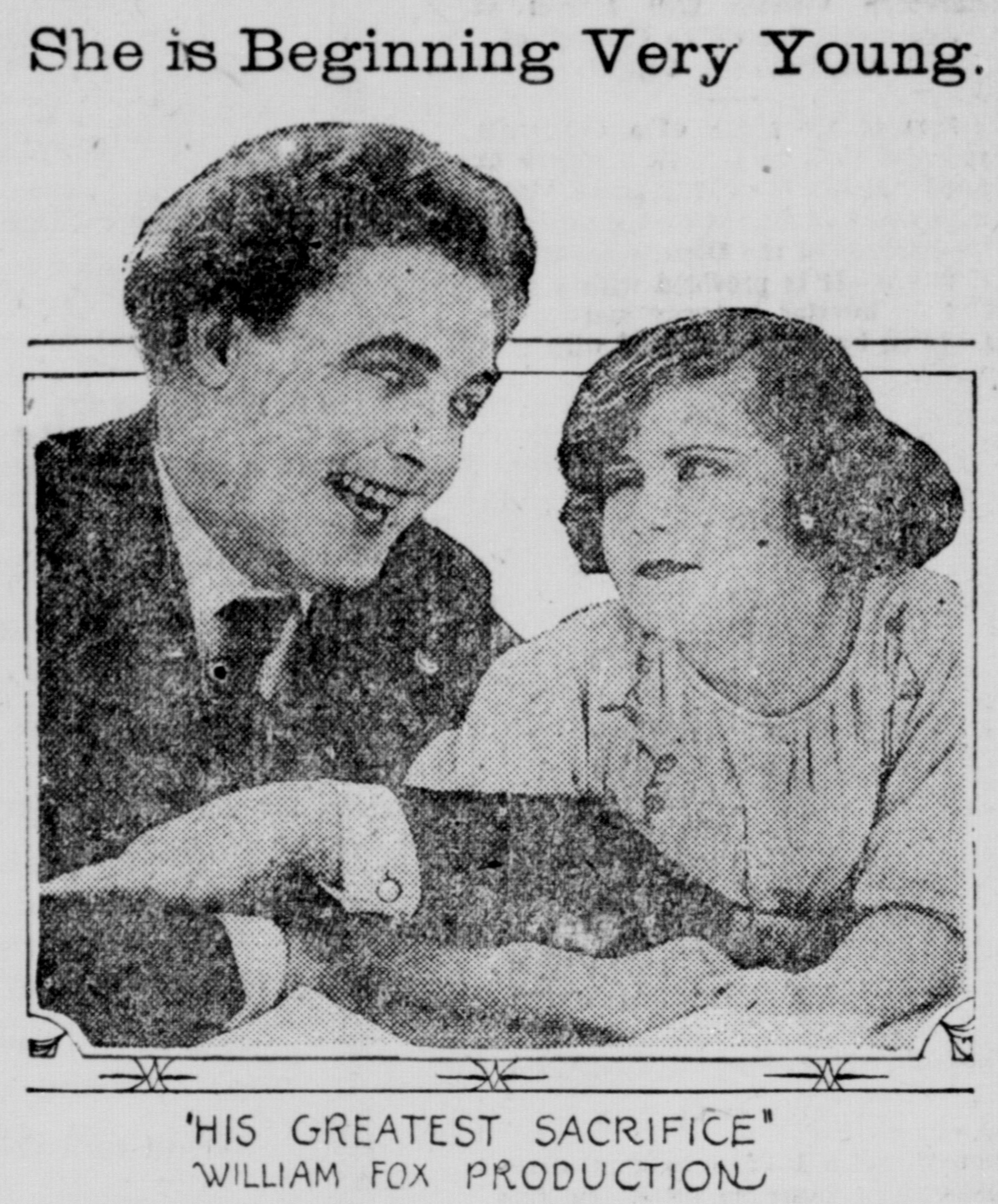
Publicity for the film.

His Greatest Sacrifice is a 1921 American drama film directed by J. Gordon Edwards and written by Paul Sloane. The film stars William Farnum, Alice Fleming, Lorna Volare, Evelyn Greeley, Frank Goldsmith and Charles Wellesley. The film was released on April 17, 1921, by Fox Film Corporation.

== Cast ==
- William Farnum as Richard Hall
- Alice Fleming as Alice Hall
- Lorna Volare as Grace Hall
- Evelyn Greeley as Mrs. Oliver
- Frank Goldsmith as James Hamilton
- Charles Wellesley as John Reed
- Henry Leone as Rimini
- Trae Dottin as John Deadlock
