= Hitting the Trail =

1918 film directed by Dell Henderson

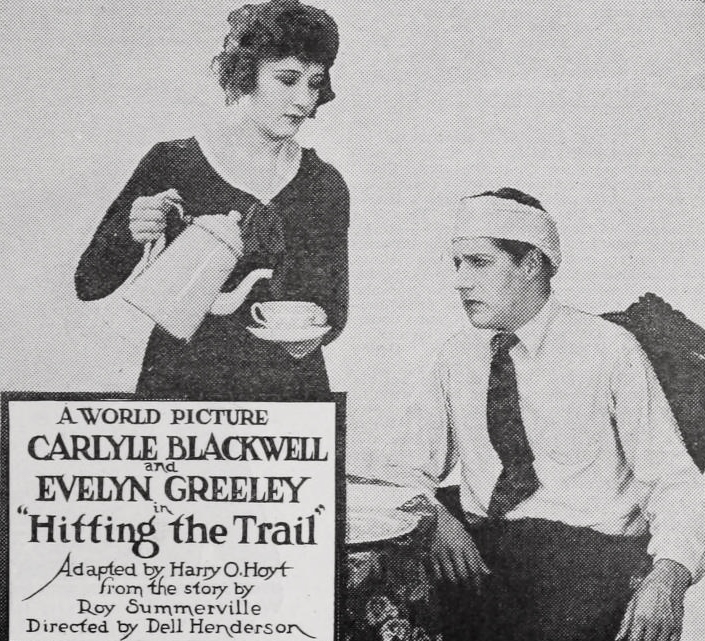
- Directed by: Dell Henderson
- Written by: Harry O. Hoyt; Roy Somerville
- Starring: Carlyle Blackwell; Evelyn Greeley; George MacQuarrie
- Cinematography: Louis Ostland; Lucien Tainguy
- Production company: World Film
- Distributed by: World Film
- Release date: December 2, 1918
- Running time: 50 minutes
- Country: United States
- Languages: Silent; English intertitles

Hitting the Trail is a 1918 American silent crime drama film directed by Dell Henderson and starring Carlyle Blackwell, Evelyn Greeley and George MacQuarrie.

== Cast ==
- Carlyle Blackwell as Kid Kelly
- Evelyn Greeley as Flo Haines
- Joseph W. Smiley as Joe Carelli
- George MacQuarrie as Reverend Thomas Roberts
- Ninon Bunyea as Mamie
- Muriel Ostriche as Annie
- Walter Greene as Tony
- Edward Elkas as Goldberg

== Bibliography ==
- Connelly, Robert B. The Silents: Silent Feature Films, 1910-36, Volume 40, Issue 2. December Press, 1998.
- Munden, Kenneth White. The American Film Institute Catalog of Motion Pictures Produced in the United States, Part 1. University of California Press, 1997.
