= The World's Applause =

1923 film by William C. deMille

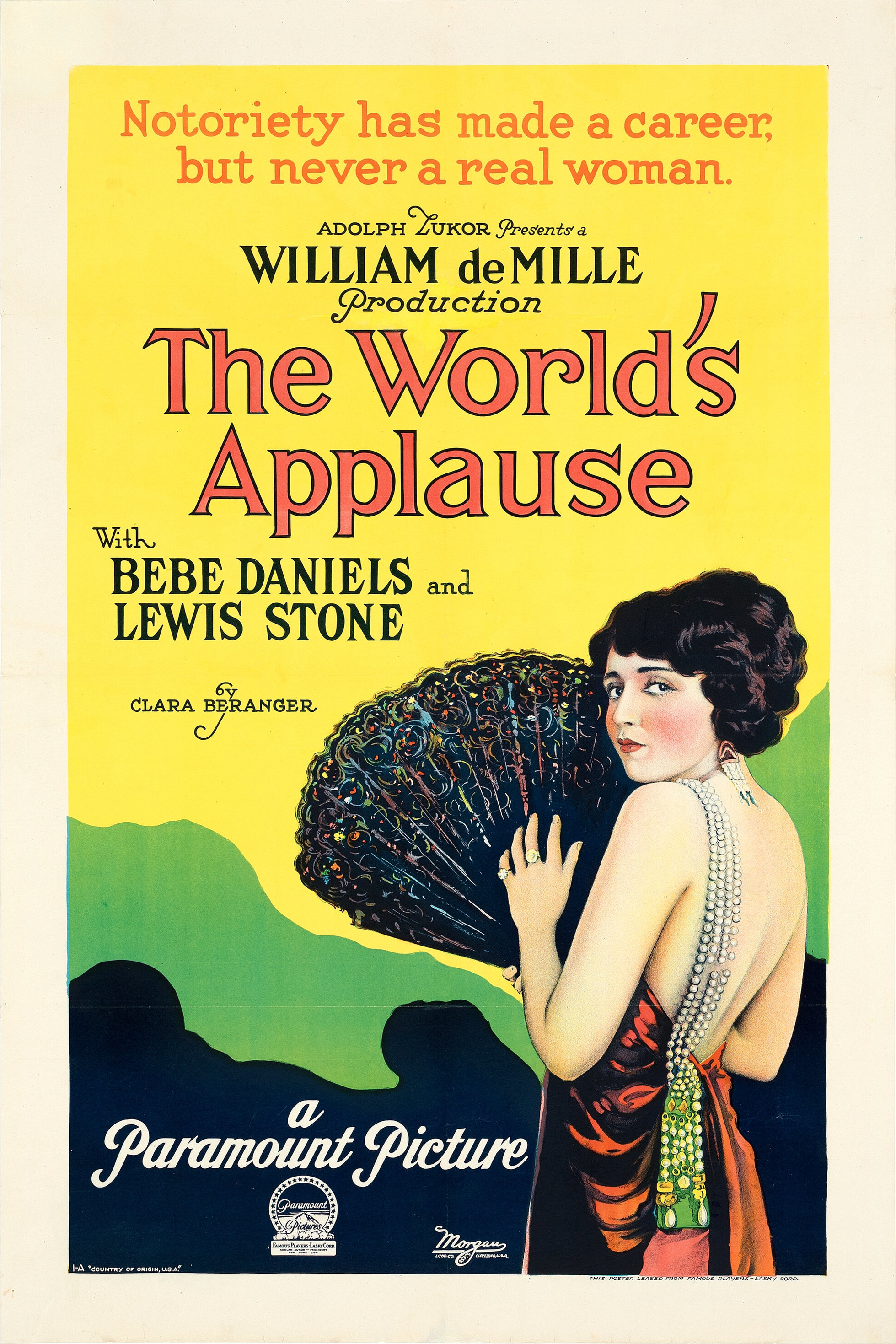
- Theatrical release poster
- Directed by: William C. deMille
- Written by: Clara Beranger (story & scenario)
- Produced by: Adolph Zukor; Jesse L. Lasky; William DeMille
- Starring: Bebe Daniels
- Cinematography: L. Guy Wilky
- Distributed by: Paramount Pictures
- Release date: January 29, 1923
- Running time: 8 reels
- Country: United States
- Language: Silent (English intertitles)

The World's Applause is a 1923 American silent drama film starring Bebe Daniels. It was produced by Famous Players–Lasky and distributed by Paramount Pictures. William C. deMille directed the film and it was written and scripted by his wife Clara Beranger.

== Plot ==
As described in a film magazine, Corinne d'Alys achieves sudden success on the stage and among her many admirers is noted artist Robert Townsend. Robert is married to Elsa, the sister of John Elliott, the producer responsible for Corinne's rise to fame. The young woman's head is turned by the praise she receives and, despite John's warning against Robert, she permits the latter to paint her portrait and pay her a good deal of attention. John himself loves Corinne and believes that wisdom will come to her with time. Robert arranges a party to take place at his studio on the evening of the day the portrait is finished. His wife gains admission to the studio through a side door and informs him that she will not leave. The guests including Corinne begin to arrive, but as the host has given orders to his valet not to disturb him until he calls, they entertain themselves while waiting.

Meanwhile, the quarrel between husband and wife rises to a fever heat. The discovery of a jewel that Robert intended to present to Corinne inflames Elsa to such a pitch of anger that she seizes a knife with the intention of destroying the portrait. She slashes it, Robert fights with her and during the struggle is stabbed to death. Elsa in a panic phones her brother and John comes to her aid. They leave the studio together, but James Crane, a newspaper owner, sees them leaving and fancies that he recognizes John. James continues to the party where Corinne has just discovered the body of Robert. The guests leave but Corinne stays, and after the police arrive and question her, she is permitted to go. The newspaper accounts of the death link Corinne's name to that of the deceased, and the ensuing notoriety ruins the new star's reputation. Her financial backers leave her.

Finally, the police review their evidence which leads them to John and he is arrested. Elsa Townsend then signs a confession and goes away, leaving a farewell note to her brother. Corinne and John's names are cleared, and she finds happiness with the man who was faithful to her through all.

== Cast ==
- Bebe Daniels as Corinne d'Alys
- Lewis Stone as John Elliott
- Kathlyn Williams as Elsa Townsend
- Adolphe Menjou as Robert Townsend
- Brandon Hurst as James Crane
- Bernice Frank as Maid to Corinne
- Mayme Kelso as Secretary to Corinne
- George Kuwa as Valet to Townsend
- James Neill as Valet to Elliott

== Preservation ==
The World's Applause is currently presumed lost. In February of 2021, the film was cited by the National Film Preservation Board on their Lost U.S. Silent Feature Films list.

== See also ==
- List of lost films
