= Phil for Short =

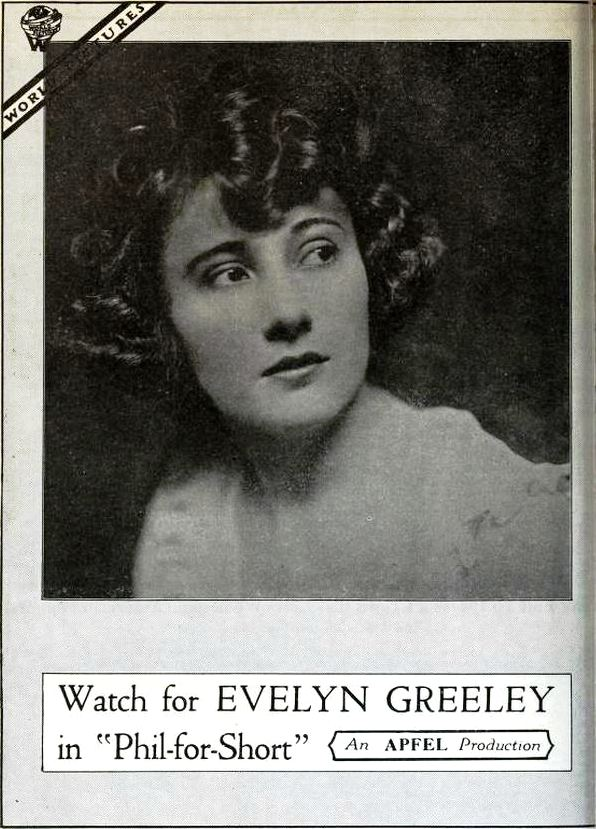
- Advertisement
- Directed by: Oscar Apfel
- Written by: Clara Beranger; Forrest Halsey
- Produced by: World Film; Oscar Apfel
- Starring: Evelyn Greeley
- Cinematography: Max Schneider; Nelson H. Minnerly
- Distributed by: World Film
- Release date: June 2, 1919
- Running time: 6 reels
- Country: United States
- Language: Silent (English intertitles)

Phil for Short is a 1919 American silent comedy film directed by Oscar Apfel and starring Evelyn Greeley. It was produced and distributed by World Film Company.

== Cast ==
- Evelyn Greeley as Damophilia Illington
- Charles Walcott as Professor Illington
- James Furey as Pat Mehan
- Jack Drumier as Donald MacWrath
- Ann Egelston as Eliza MacWrath
- Hugh Thompson as John Alden
- Henrietta Simpson as Mrs. Alden
- Ethel Grey Terry as Angelica Wentworth
- Edward Arnold as Tom Wentworth
- John Adrizani as Ivanovitch
- Tony Merlo as Clifford Brown
- Florence Short as Prudence
- Henry Hallam as President of College

== Preservation ==
A print of Phil for Short is housed in the Library of Congress collection.
