= The Road to France =

1918 film directed by Dell Henderson

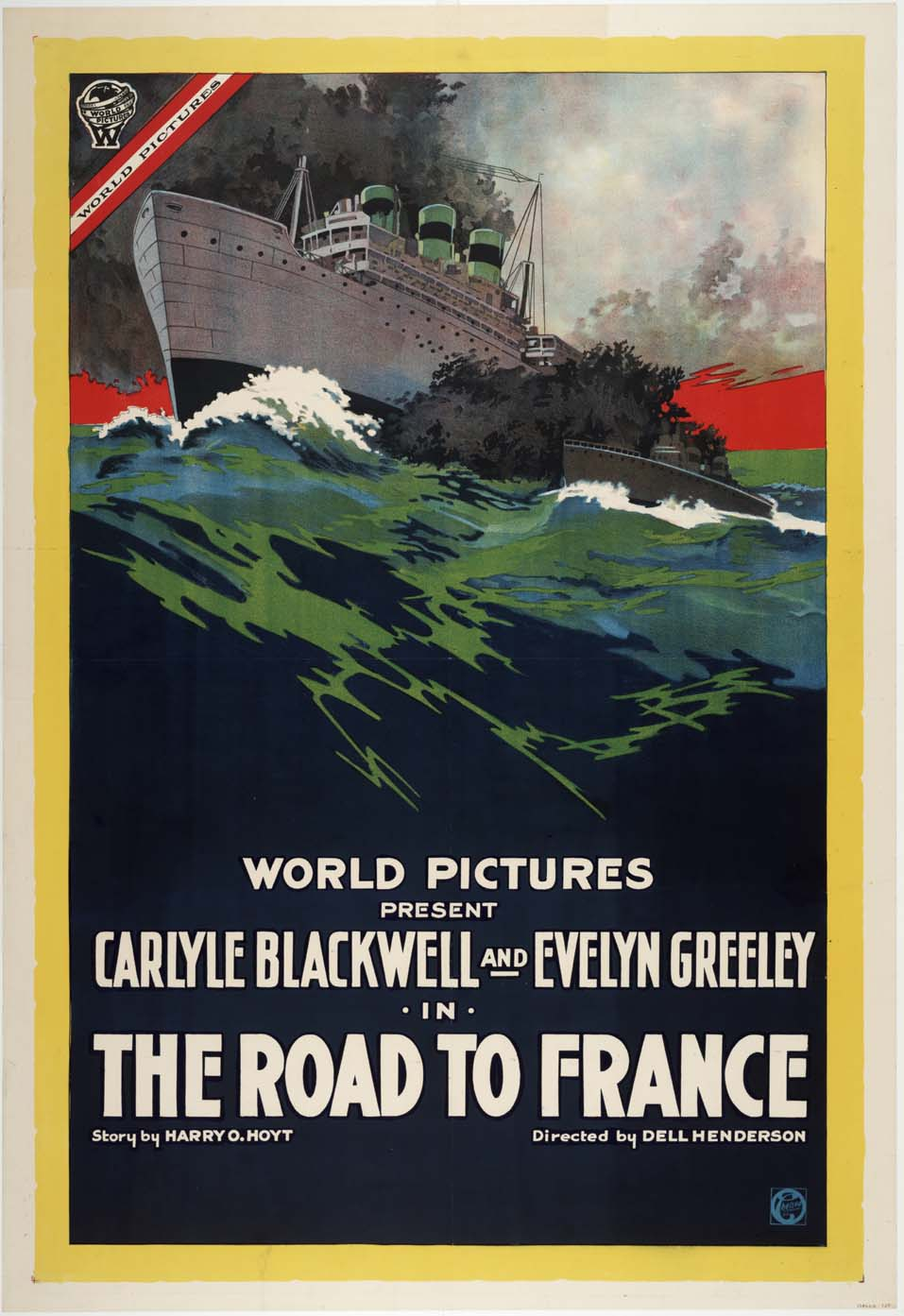
- Directed by: Dell Henderson
- Written by: Harry O. Hoyt
- Starring: Carlyle Blackwell; Evelyn Greeley; Jack Drumier
- Cinematography: Louis Ostland
- Production company: World Film
- Distributed by: World Film
- Release date: October 14, 1918
- Running time: 60 minutes
- Country: United States
- Languages: Silent; English intertitles

The Road to France is a 1918 American silent war drama film directed by Dell Henderson and starring Carlyle Blackwell, Evelyn Greeley and Jack Drumier.

== Cast ==
- Carlyle Blackwell as Tom Whitney
- Evelyn Greeley as Helen Bemis
- Jack Drumier as John Bemis
- Muriel Ostriche as Mollie
- George De Carlton as Robert Whitney
- Jane Sterling as Mrs. Whitney
- Richard Neill as Hector Winter
- Inez Shannon as Mrs. O'Leary
- Henry West as Burns
- Alex Shannon as Hugo Kraus
- Joseph W. Smiley as Chief of Police
- J. Gunnis Davis as Dennis O'Leary
- Elizabeth Kennedy as Little O'Leary Girl
- Al Hart as One-eyed Man

== Preservation ==
- No prints of the film exist. It is now a lost film.

== Bibliography ==
- Connelly, Robert B. The Silents: Silent Feature Films, 1910-36, Volume 40, Issue 2. December Press, 1998. ISBN 978-0-913204-36-8.
- Munden, Kenneth White. The American Film Institute Catalog of Motion Pictures Produced in the United States, Part 1. University of California Press, 1997. ISBN 978-0-520-20969-5.
