= Her Final Reckoning =

- Directed by: Émile Chautard
- Screenplay by: Charles E. Whittaker
- Based on: Le Prince Zilah by Jules Claretie
- Produced by: Adolph Zukor
- Starring: Pauline Frederick; John Miltern; Robert Cain; Warren Cook; Joseph W. Smiley; James Laffey
- Cinematography: Jacques Bizeul (fr)
- Production company: Famous Players–Lasky Corporation
- Distributed by: Paramount Pictures
- Release date: June 23, 1918
- Running time: 50 minutes
- Country: United States
- Language: Silent (English intertitles)

Her Final Reckoning is a 1918 American silent drama film directed by Émile Chautard. The film stars Pauline Frederick, John Miltern, Robert Cain, Warren Cook, Joseph W. Smiley, and James Laffey. Her Final Reckoning was adapted for the screen by Charles E. Whittaker based on the play Le Prince Zilah by Jules Claretie. The play was also adapted for film in Italy in the same year under the title Il Principe Zilah. That adaptation was directed by Ugo De Simone. The film was released on June 23, 1918, by Paramount Pictures.

== Plot ==
As described in a film magazine, Marsa, daughter of a Russian nobleman whose wealth she inherits, meets and falls in love with Prince Zilah in Paris. Between them rises the shadow of a secret, the nature of which is revealed, with Count Menko hurrying to Paris upon learning of Marsa's engagement to the Prince. The Count orders her to meet him in the garden. She turns her dogs loose on him and he is badly injured and disappears for a time. The Count sends a packet of love letters to the Prince on the eve of the marriage. Marsa becomes ill and loses her mind. A friend of Prince runs down the Count and kills him in a duel. The Prince and Marsa are reconciled.

== Cast ==
- Pauline Frederick as Marsa
- John Miltern as Prince Zilah
- Robert Cain as Count Menko
- Warren Cook as Count Varhely
- Joseph W. Smiley as Doctor Forg
- James Laffey as Doctor Charcot
- Karl Dane as Prince Tcheretoff
- Florence Beresford as Marquis de Nati
- Louis Reinhard as Marsa's Butler
- Edith Ellwood as Marsa's Maid

== Reception ==
Like many American films of the time, Her Final Reckoning was subject to restrictions and cuts by city and state film censorship boards. For example, the Chicago Board of Censors issued an Adults Only permit and cut, in Reel 2, the intertitle "At midnight this key will bring me your presence and you shall have your letters back, if —".

== Preservation ==
Her Final Reckoning is currently presumed lost. In February of 2021, the film was cited by the National Film Preservation Board on their Lost U.S. Silent Feature Films list.
