= The Heart of a Girl =

1918 film by John G. Adolfi

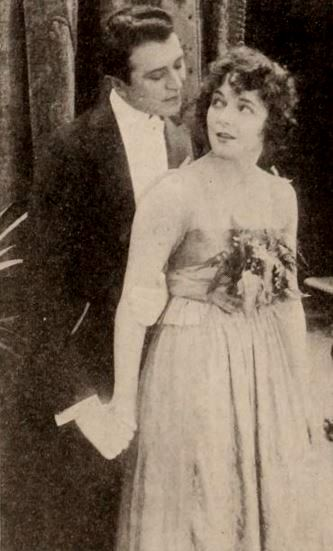
- Directed by: John G. Adolfi
- Written by: George DuBois Proctor; Maravene Thompson
- Produced by: William A. Brady
- Starring: Barbara Castleton; Irving Cummings; Charles Wellesley
- Cinematography: Sol Polito
- Production company: World Film
- Distributed by: World Film
- Release date: July 1, 1918
- Country: United States
- Languages: Silent; English intertitles

The Heart of a Girl is a lost 1918 American silent drama film directed by John G. Adolfi and starring Barbara Castleton, Irving Cummings and Charles Wellesley.

== Cast ==
- Barbara Castleton as Betty Lansing
- Irving Cummings as Brandon Kent
- Charles Wellesley as Francis Oakland
- Kate Lester as Mrs. Lansing
- Ricca Allen as Mrs. Ogden
- William T. Carleton as Sen. Murray
- Gladys Valerie as Helen Murray
- Florence Coventry as Mrs. Oakland
- Clay Clement as J. Drake
- Anthony Byrd as Abe
- Inez Shannon as Mrs. Murphy
- John Tansey as Jack
- J. Blake as Johnson
- L. Canfield as Johnson's manager
- Joseph W. Smiley as Kent's manager

== Bibliography ==
- Paul C. Spehr. The Movies Begin: Making Movies in New Jersey, 1887-1920. Newark Museum, 1977.
