= Jack Drumier =

American actor

- Born: October 19, 1867; Philadelphia, Pennsylvania, United States
- Died: April 2, 1929 (aged 61); Clearwater, Florida, United States
- Occupation: Actor
- Years active: 1914-1925 (film)

Jack Drumier (October 19, 1867 – April 2, 1929) was an American film actor of the silent era.

== Filmography ==
=== Films ===
- The $5,000,000 Counterfeiting Plot (1914) - Chief of the Secret Service
- The Woman in Black (1914)
- Beyond the Wall (1916) - John Carlton
- The Dancer's Peril (1917) - Lamoraux
- Darkest Russia (1917) - Count Paul Nazimoff
- The False Friend (1917) - Robert Farrell
- The Divorce Game (1917) - Mendoza
- The Beloved Adventuress (1917) - Robert Nicholson
- The Little Duchess (1917) - Earl of Carinmore
- The Marriage Market (1917) - John Grant
- The Burglar (1917) - John Hamilton
- Easy Money (1917) - Peter K. Chanslor
- Adventures of Carol (1917) - Mr. Fairfax
- The Volunteer (1917) - Timothy Mendenhall
- Stolen Hours (1918) - Lord Harron
- The Whims of Society (1918) - John Travers
- The Way Out (1918) - La Roche
- The Beautiful Mrs. Reynolds (1918) - John Adams
- The Witch Woman (1918) - Delaunay
- Journey's End (1918) - Pop Moore
- Vengeance (1918) - Old Lord Cuddlestone
- The Man Hunt (1918) - Parson Brown
- The Golden Wall (1918) - Mr. Lathrop
- Heredity (1918) - Ralph Edgars
- The Beloved Blackmailer (1918) - Spike Brogan
- The Power and the Glory (1918) - Hardwick
- By Hook or Crook (1918) - Frederic Pritchard Sr.
- A Soul Without Windows (1918) - Mr. Palmer
- Appearance of Evil (1918) - Ross Darnton
- The Road to France (1918) - John Bemis
- Just Sylvia (1918) - Zebulon Hicks
- The Love Net (1918) - Captain Amos Barnes
- Phil for Short (1919) - Donald MacWrath
- Courage for Two (1919) - Nichols
- Hit or Miss (1919) - Professor Angus MacDowell
- The Quickening Flame (1919) - Judge Mason
- Three Green Eyes (1919) - Thomas Wiggan
- An Amateur Widow (1919) - James Potter
- Home Wanted (1919) - Pierre
- Forest Rivals (1919) - Henri Lamont
- The Praise Agent (1919) - Senator Eubanks
- The Black Circle (1919) - Daniel Baird
- Dad's Girl (1920)
- You Find It Everywhere (1921) - Harvey Hill
- The Girl from Porcupine (1921) - Bill Higgins
- The Splendid Lie (1922) - David Delafield
- The Broken Silence (1922) - Indian Joe
- Shadows of the Sea (1922) - Shivering Sam
- Emblems of Love (1923)
- Enemies of Youth (1925)
- The Pinch Hitter (1925) - Obadiah Parker

=== Shorts ===
- The Cricket on the Hearth (1914) - Caleb Plummer
- The Ring and the Book (1914) - Pietro
- Gwendolin (1914) - Sir Hugo
- His Mother's Home (1914)
- Martin Chuzzlewit (1914) - Old Martin Chuzzlewit
- The Wife's Stratagem (1914) - The Peddler
- Masks and Faces (1914) - Triplet
- The Fleur-de-Lis Ring (1914) - The Sweetheart's Father
- Ernest Maltravers (1914) - Darvil
- The Girl and the Miser (1914) - The Miser
- The Closing Web (1914) - John Graham
- A Scrap of Paper (1914) - Brisemouche
- The Crimson Moth (1914) - Mr. Huntington
- All for the Boy (1915) - The Boy's Father
- The House of Horror (1915) - The Money Lender
- Heart's Hunger (1915) - The Magazine Writer
- File No. 113 (1915) - Fauvel - the Banker
- Three Hats (1915) - Bosco Blithers
- Dwellers in Glass Houses (1915) - Dist. Atty. Carlisle
- His Romany Wife (1915) - Gorman
- Colomba (1915) - General Nevil
- Aurora Floyd (1915) - Jack Floyd
- After the Storm (1915) - Nathan Cooper
- The Bridge Across (1915) - Colonel Randolph
- Lorna Doone (1915) - Sir Ensor Doone
- The Girl and the Matinee Idol (1915) - Horace Morse - Matinee Idol
- One Hundred Dollars (1915) - Billy's Employer
- When Hearts Are Young (1915) - Silas Ross
- The Confession (1915) - Dr. Morton
- Felix Holt (1915) - Rufus Lyon
- For Her Happiness (1915) - The Doctor
- The Maid o' the Mountain (1915) - U.S. Marshall
- Man and His Master (1915) - The Selfish Factory Owner
- Mrs. Van Alden's Jewels (1915) - Davidson
- Coincidence (1915) - The Blind Violinist
- Under Two Flags (1915) - Lord Guenevere
- Mister Paganini (1915) - Mister Paganini - the Blind Violinist
- Dora (1915) - Farmer Allen's Brother - Dora's Father
- A Difference of Opinion (1915)
- The Man Who Never Was Caught (1915)
- The Soul of Pierre (1915)
- The Country Parson (1915)
- A Mystery of the Mountains (1915)
- Harvest (1915)
- Between Father and Son (1915)
- The Reproach of Annesley (1915)
- Count Twenty (1915)
- The Woman of Mystery (1915) - Baradier
- A Life Chase (1916)
- The Chain of Evidence (1916)
- The Iron Will (1916) - Mariora's Father
- Pique (1916) - Arthur's Father
- The Guilt of Stephen Eldridge (1916) - Mr. Curzon
- The Mystery of Orcival (1916) - Mayor Courtois
- The Battle of Truth (1916) - The Railroad President
- Alias Jimmy Barton (1916) - Mr. Randolph - Chester's Father
- Madelaine Morel (1916) - Morel - Madelaine's Father
- The Man Who Called After Dark (1916) - Henry Whitmore
- Celeste (1916) - Prosper
- Merry Mary (1916) - Professor Noggs

== Bibliography ==
- Cari Beauchamp. Without Lying Down: Frances Marion and the Powerful Women of Early Hollywood. University of California Press, 1998.
- Ken Wlaschin. Silent Mystery and Detective Movies: A Comprehensive Filmography. McFarland, 2009.
