= By Hook or Crook (film) =

1918 film directed by Dell Henderson

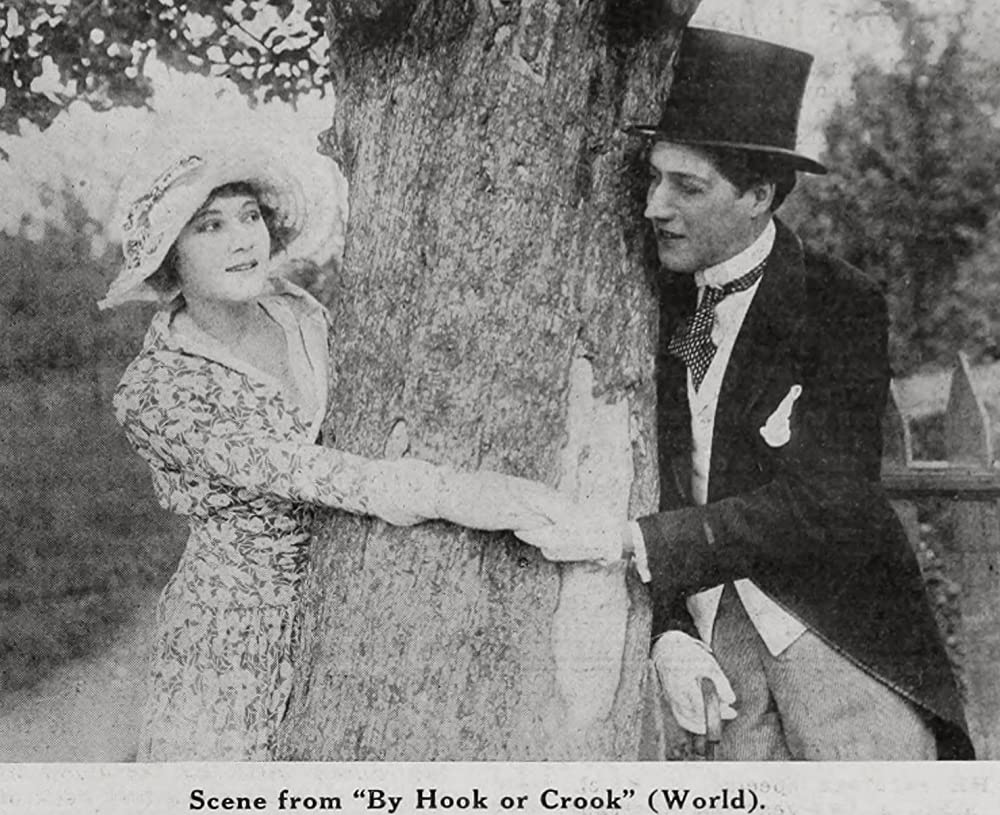
- Directed by: Dell Henderson
- Written by: Harry O. Hoyt; Clara Beranger
- Starring: Carlyle Blackwell; Evelyn Greeley; Jack Drumier
- Cinematography: Louis Ostland
- Production company: World Film
- Distributed by: World Film
- Release date: September 9, 1918
- Running time: 50 minutes
- Country: United States
- Languages: Silent; English intertitles

By Hook or Crook is a 1918 American silent comedy film directed by Dell Henderson and starring Carlyle Blackwell, Evelyn Greeley and Jack Drumier. It was shot at Fort Lee, New Jersey.

== Cast ==
- Carlyle Blackwell as Frederic Pritchard
- Evelyn Greeley as Gloria Nevins
- Jack Drumier as Frederic Pritchard Sr.
- Frank Doane as Smithson
- Jennie Ellison as Mrs. Pritchard
- Nora Cecil as Aunt Marie
- Alice Chapin as Mrs. Nevins
- Henry Warwick as Henry Arnold

== Reception ==
Variety's review was positive, the story was described as "improbable but interesting" and the reviewer found the settings "pleasing."

Moving Picture World's Edward Weitzel gave the film a positive review as well, praising the cast.

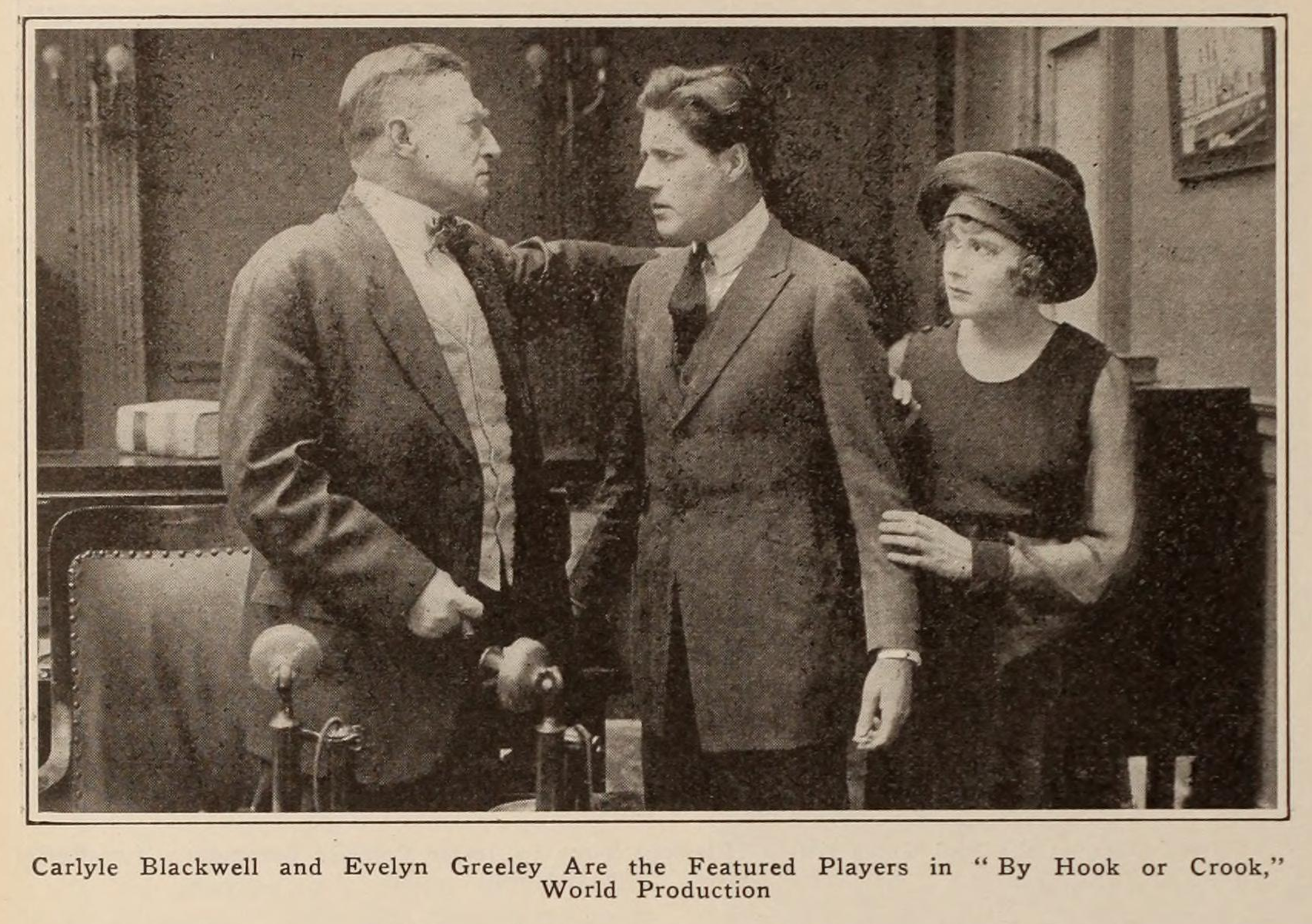
Jack Drumier, Carlyle Blackwell, and Evelyn Greeley

Motion Picture News was also positive, giving particular praise to Carlyle Blackwell for his comedic performance and stunt-work later in the film.

== Censorship ==
The Chicago Board of Censors removed several scenes of a burglar stealing from safe in reel 3 and of a man sandpapering his finger tips in reel 4.

== Preservation ==
With no prints of By Hook or Crook located in any film archives, it is considered a lost film.

== Bibliography ==
- Altomara, Rita Ecke. Hollywood on the Palisades: A Filmography of Silent Features Made in Fort Lee, New Jersey, 1903-1927. Garland Pub, 1983.
- Connelly, Robert B. The Silents: Silent Feature Films, 1910-36, Volume 40, Issue 2. December Press, 1998.
- Munden, Kenneth White. The American Film Institute Catalog of Motion Pictures Produced in the United States, Part 1. University of California Press, 1997.
