= The Beloved Blackmailer =

1918 film directed by Dell Henderson

- Directed by: Dell Henderson
- Written by: Harry O. Hoyt; Clara Beranger; Lucien Hubbard
- Starring: Carlyle Blackwell; Evelyn Greeley; William T. Carleton
- Cinematography: Louis Ostland
- Production company: World Film
- Distributed by: World Film
- Release date: August 12, 1918
- Running time: 50 minutes
- Country: United States
- Languages: Silent; English intertitles

The Beloved Blackmailer is a 1918 American silent comedy film directed by Dell Henderson and starring Carlyle Blackwell, Evelyn Greeley and William T. Carleton. It was shot in Fort Lee, New Jersey.

== Cast ==
- Carlyle Blackwell as Bobby Briggs
- William T. Carleton as Alexander Briggs
- Isabel Berwin as Mrs. Briggs
- Evelyn Greeley as Corinne Norris
- Charles Dungan as George Norris
- Jack Drumier as Spike Brogan
- Rex McDougall as Wesley Martin

== Preservation ==
An abridged version of The Beloved Blackmailer is held by BFI.

== Bibliography ==
- Altomara, Rita Ecke. Hollywood on the Palisades: A Filmography of Silent Features Made in Fort Lee, New Jersey, 1903-1927. Garland Pub, 1983.
- Connelly, Robert B. The Silents: Silent Feature Films, 1910-36, Volume 40, Issue 2. December Press, 1998.
- Munden, Kenneth White. The American Film Institute Catalog of Motion Pictures Produced in the United States, Part 1. University of California Press, 1997.
