= The Golden Wall =

1918 film directed by Dell Henderson

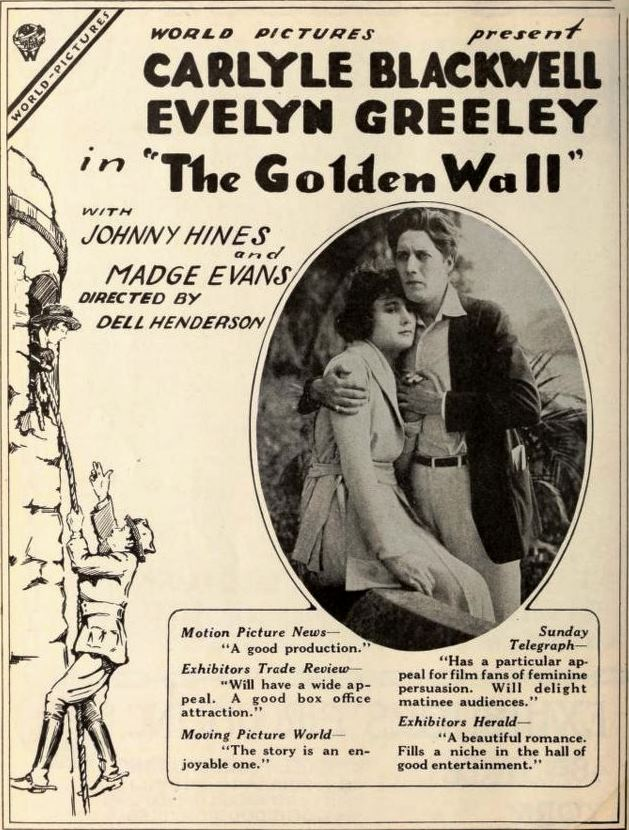
- Directed by: Dell Henderson
- Written by: Clara Beranger
- Produced by: William A. Brady
- Starring: Carlyle Blackwell; Evelyn Greeley; Johnny Hines
- Cinematography: Louis Ostland
- Production company: World Film
- Distributed by: World Film
- Release date: July 15, 1918
- Running time: 50 minutes
- Country: United States
- Languages: Silent; English intertitles

The Golden Wall is a 1918 American silent comedy drama film directed by Dell Henderson and starring Carlyle Blackwell, Evelyn Greeley and Johnny Hines. It was shot at Fort Lee, New Jersey.

== Cast ==
- Carlyle Blackwell as Charles de la Fontaine, Marquis d'Aubeterre
- Evelyn Greeley as Marian Lathrop
- Johnny Hines as Frank Lathropp
- Winifred Leighton as Helen d'aubeterre
- Madge Evans as Madge Lathroop
- Jack Drumier as Mr. Lathrop
- Kate Lester as Countess d'Este
- George MacQuarrie as Rudolph Miller
- Attilio Corbell as Monsieur Fremiere
- Florence Coventry as Mrs. Lathrop
- Louise de Rigney as Mlle. Julie

== Reception ==
Variety's review was positive, having exceptional praise for the cast and the reviewer found the story to be "neither hackneyed nor improbable, and sufficiently interesting."

== Preservation ==
With no prints of The Golden Wall located in any film archives, it is considered a lost film.

== Bibliography ==
- Altomara, Rita Ecke. Hollywood on the Palisades: A Filmography of Silent Features Made in Fort Lee, New Jersey, 1903-1927. Garland Pub, 1983.
- Connelly, Robert B. The Silents: Silent Feature Films, 1910-36, Volume 40, Issue 2. December Press, 1998.
- Munden, Kenneth White. The American Film Institute Catalog of Motion Pictures Produced in the United States, Part 1. University of California Press, 1997.
