= Charles Wellesley =

American actor

- Born: November 17, 1873; London
- Died: July 24, 1946 (aged 72); Amityville, New York, US
- Occupation: Actor
- Years active: 1913–1928
- Spouse: Ina Rorke
- Children: 1

Charles Wellesley (November 17, 1873 – July 24, 1946) was an Irish-born American actor of the silent era.

Wellesley was born in London.

Wellesley appeared in more than 80 films between 1913 and 1928.

Wellesley married actress Ina Rorke, and he had a stepson. He died on July 24, 1946, in the Brunswick Home Amityville, New York, aged 71.

== Partial filmography ==
- My Official Wife (1914)
- The Battle of Frenchman's Run (1915)
- Hearts and the Highway (1915)
- The Daring of Diana (1916)
- The Hero of Submarine D-2 (1916)
- The Enemy (1916)
- The Poor Little Rich Girl (1917)
- Redemption (1917)
- Her Better Self (1917)
- Richard the Brazen (1917)
- Wrath (1917)
- By Right of Purchase (1918)
- Madame Jealousy (1918)
- The Heart of a Girl (1918)
- The Song of Songs (1918)
- The Purple Lily (1918)
- Nobody (1921)
- His Greatest Sacrifice (1921)
- It Isn't Being Done This Season (1921)
- Outcast (1922)
- The Rapids (1922)
- Legally Dead (1923)
- Alias the Night Wind (1923)
- Don't Marry for Money (1923)
- The Acquittal (1923)
- Enemies of Children (1923)
- The Wolf Man (1924)
- Cytherea (1924)
- Traffic in Hearts (1924)
- The Perfect Flapper (1924)
- The Lost World (1925)
- The Half-Way Girl (1925)
- The Unholy Three (1925) (uncredited)
- College Days (1926)
- Sinews of Steel (1927)
- The Stolen Bride (1927)
- Skinner's Big Idea (1928)
