= Three Green Eyes =

1919 film directed by Dell Henderson

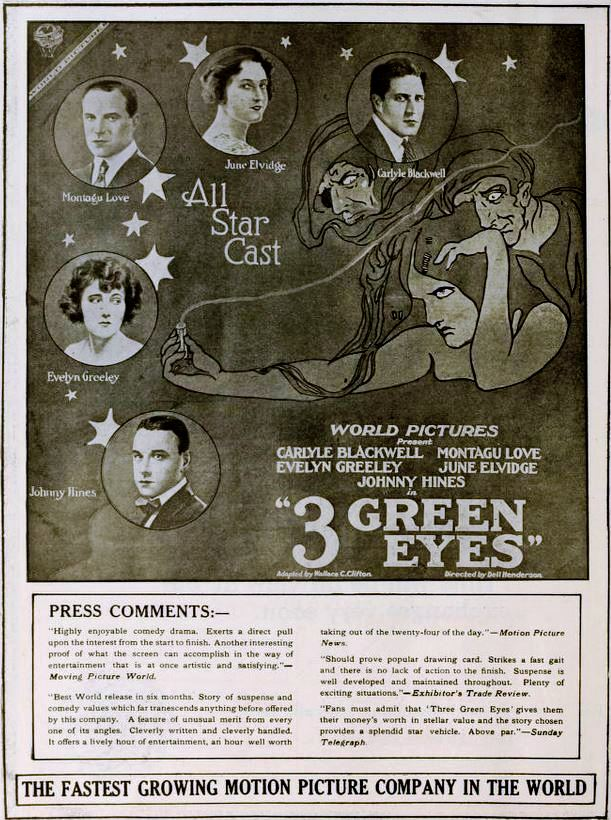
- Directed by: Dell Henderson
- Written by: Victorien Sardou (play); Wallace Clifton
- Starring: Carlyle Blackwell; Evelyn Greeley; Montagu Love
- Production company: World Film
- Distributed by: World Film
- Release date: April 28, 1919
- Running time: 50 minutes
- Country: United States
- Languages: Silent; English intertitles

Three Green Eyes is a lost 1919 American silent comedy film directed by Dell Henderson and starring Carlyle Blackwell, Evelyn Greeley and Montagu Love.

== Cast ==
- Carlyle Blackwell as Paul Arden
- Evelyn Greeley as Suzanne Russell
- Montagu Love as Allen Granat
- June Elvidge as Lucille Vale
- Johnny Hines as Johnnie Wiggan
- Jack Drumier as Thomas Wiggan
- Dorothy Dee as Marion Vale
- Mathilde Brundage as Ms. Vale
- William Black as Capt. Arden
- Yusti Yama as Yamata
- Madge Evans as Child

== Reception ==
Variety's review was positive, finding the film to be hilarious and described the production to be "above the average for features of this particular type."

== Preservation ==
With no holdings located in archives, Three Green Eyes is considered a lost film.

== Bibliography ==
- Connelly, Robert B. The Silents: Silent Feature Films, 1910-36, Volume 40, Issue 2. December Press, 1998.
- Munden, Kenneth White. The American Film Institute Catalog of Motion Pictures Produced in the United States, Part 1. University of California Press, 1997.
