= The Purple Lily =

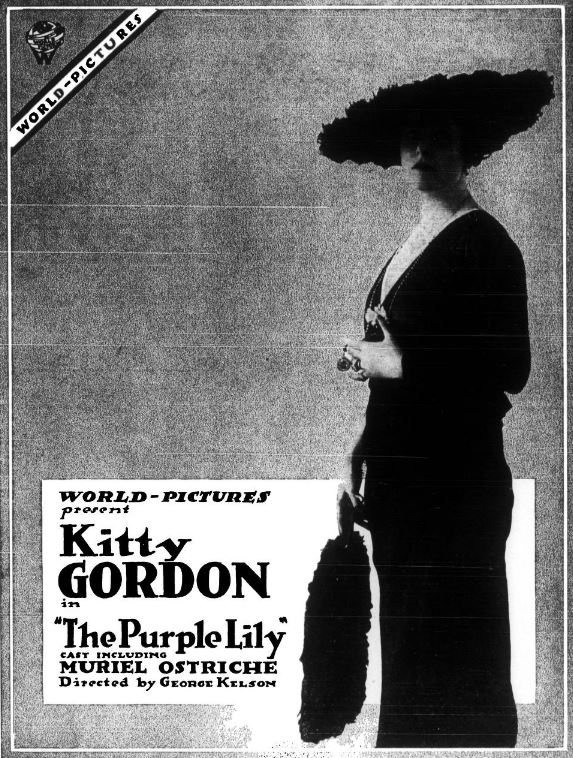
- Directed by: Fred Kelsey
- Written by: Archer MacMackin (story Devil's Dive)
- Produced by: World Film Company
- Starring: Kitty Gordon
- Cinematography: Louis Ostland; Lucien Tainguy
- Distributed by: World Film Company
- Release date: April 22, 1918
- Running time: 5 reels
- Country: USA
- Language: Silent..English titles

The Purple Lily is a lost 1918 silent film drama directed by Fred Kelsey and starring Kitty Gordon. It was produced and distributed by World Film Company.

== Cast ==
- Kitty Gordon – Marie Burguet
- Frank Mayo – James Caldwell
- Muriel Ostriche – Ruth Caldwell
- Charles Wellesley – Sir Philip Bradley
- Clay Clement – Frank Farnsworth
- Henry West – Jean
- Howard Kyle – The Curé
- John Dudley – The Doctor
- Carl Axzelle – Emile
