= Monday Morning in a Coney Island Police Court =

1908 film directed by D. W. Griffith

- Directed by: D. W. Griffith
- Written by: Mack Sennett
- Starring: John R. Cumpson
- Cinematography: G. W. Bitzer
- Release date: September 4, 1908
- Running time: 7 minutes (one reel)
- Country: United States
- Language: Silent

Monday Morning in a Coney Island Police Court is a 1908 American silent short comedy film directed by D. W. Griffith.

== Cast ==
- John R. Cumpson as Honorable Patrick McPheeney
- Harry Solter as McPheeney's Aide
- Edward Dillon
- George Gebhardt as Happy Hooligan Character
- Robert Harron as Young Man
- Dell Henderson
- Anthony O'Sullivan as Ignatius O'Brien, Attorney
- Mack Sennett as Policeman
