= The Battle of Hearts =

1916 film by Oscar Apfel

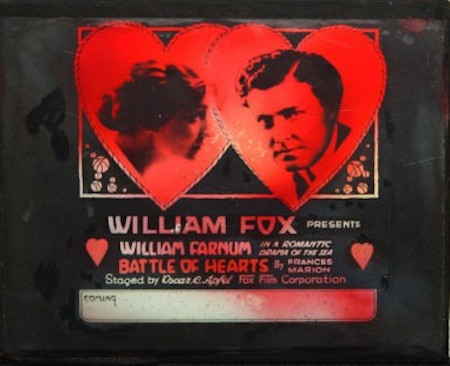
- Lantern slide
- Directed by: Oscar Apfel
- Written by: Oscar Apfel (scenario)
- Story by: Woman Against the Sea by Frances Marion
- Produced by: Oscar Apfel; William Fox
- Starring: William Farnum; Hedda Hopper
- Cinematography: Alfredo Gandolfi
- Distributed by: Fox Film Corporation
- Release date: May 22, 1916
- Running time: 50 minutes
- Country: United States
- Language: Silent (English intertitles)

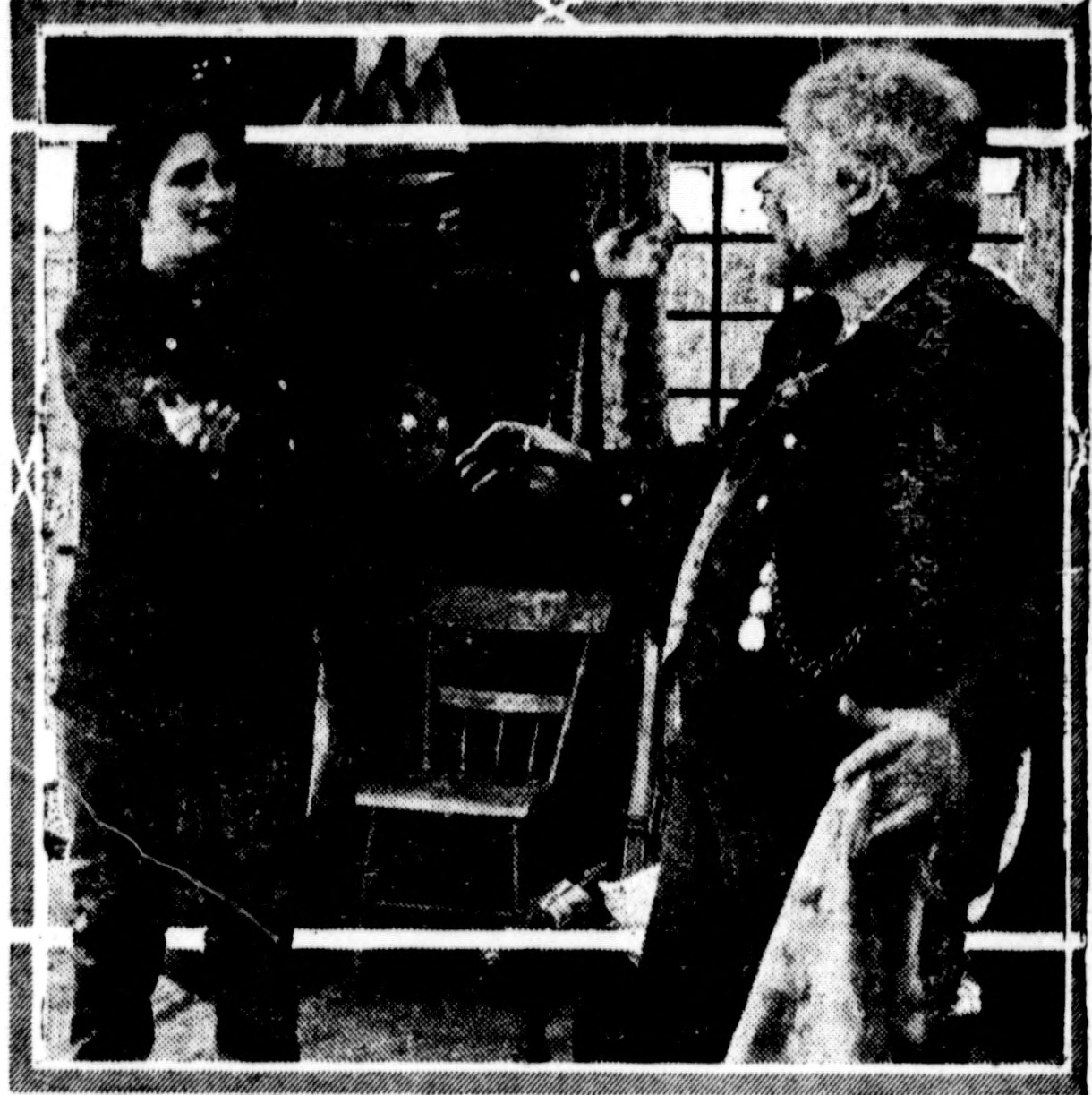
Scene from the film, from a contemporary newspaper.

The Battle of Hearts is a 1916 American silent drama film written and directed by Oscar Apfel, and produced and distributed by Fox Film Corporation. It starred William Farnum and Elda Furry (later known as Hedda Hopper). The story was written by Frances Marion, then still an actress herself. This was Hopper's first motion picture.

Most of the film is lost. Hopper screened small portions of it in 1942 in her self-produced short series Hedda Hopper's Hollywood. It is unknown if she had a complete print of this film at the time. These portions can be seen today in her 1942 short and are the only known surviving footage from the film.

== Cast ==
- William Farnum as Martin Cane
- Hedda Hopper as Maida Rhodes (credited as Elda Furry)
- Wheeler Oakman as Jo Sprague
- William Burress as Captain Sprague
- Willard Louis as Captain Rhodes

== See also ==
- 1937 Fox vault fire
- List of lost films
- List of Fox Film films
