= The Girl from Porcupine =

1921 film directed by Dell Henderson

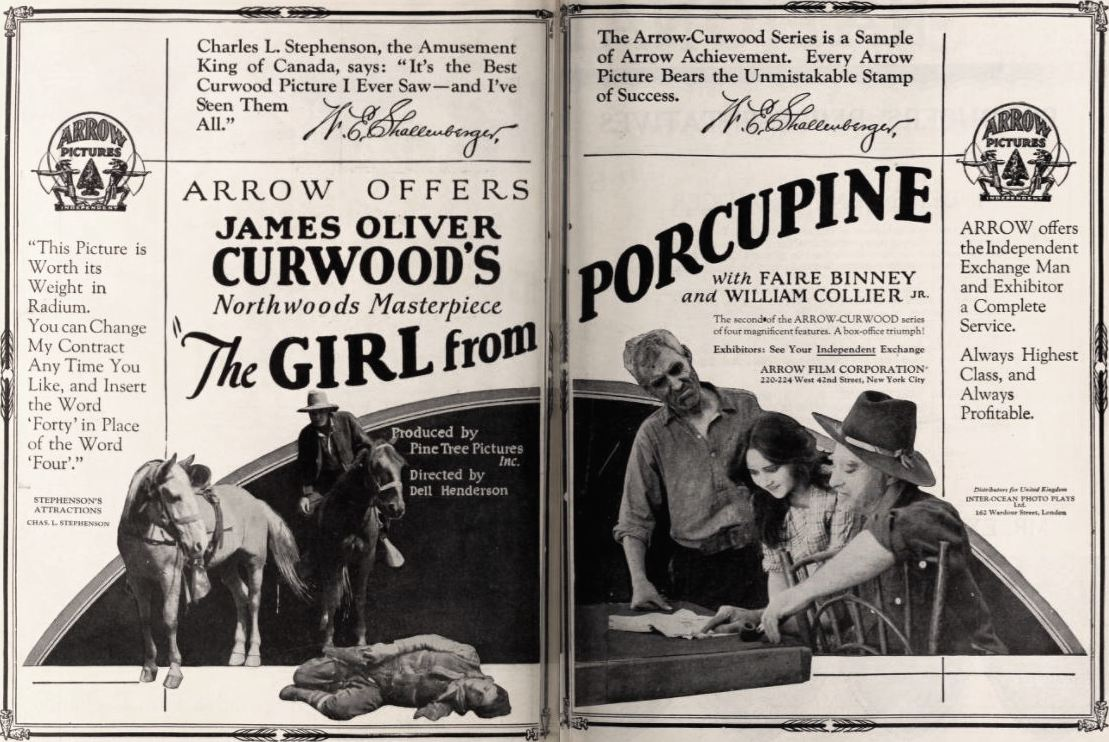
- Directed by: Dell Henderson
- Written by: James Oliver Curwood
- Starring: Faire Binney; William Collier Jr. Jack Drumier
- Cinematography: Charles Downs; Lucien Tainguy
- Production company: Pine Tree Pictures
- Distributed by: Arrow Film Corporation
- Release date: October 26, 1921
- Running time: 60 minutes
- Country: United States
- Languages: Silent; English intertitles

The Girl from Porcupine is a 1921 American silent Western film directed by Dell Henderson and starring Faire Binney, William Collier Jr. and Jack Drumier.

== Cast ==
- Faire Binney as Hope Dugan
- William Collier Jr. as Jim McTvish
- Jack Drumier as Bill Higgins
- James Milady as Sam Hawks
- Adolph Milar as Red McTavish
- Tom Blake as Dugan
- Marcia Harris as Schoolteacher
- Jack Hopkins as Her Brother
- Sam J. Ryan as Brandt
- Gus Pixley as Miller
- Mary Malatesta as Mrs Miller
- Tom Wallace as First holdup man
- Ben Lewis as Second holdup man
