= Courage for Two =

1919 film directed by Dell Henderson

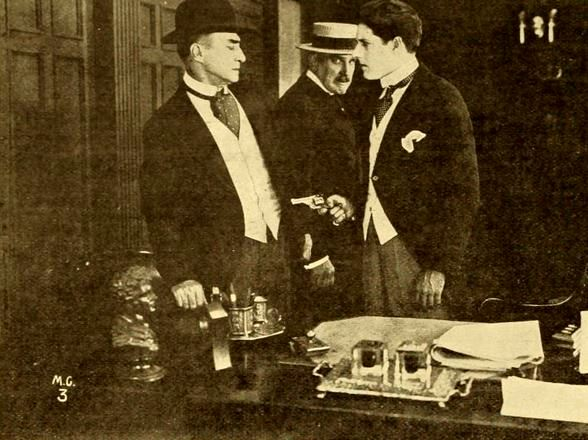
- Directed by: Dell Henderson
- Written by: Harry O. Hoyt; Hamilton Smith
- Starring: Carlyle Blackwell; Evelyn Greeley; Rosina Henley
- Cinematography: Lucien Tainguy
- Production company: World Film
- Distributed by: World Film
- Release date: February 17, 1919
- Running time: 50 minutes
- Country: United States
- Languages: Silent; English intertitles

Courage for Two is a 1919 American silent comedy film directed by Dell Henderson and starring Carlyle Blackwell, Evelyn Greeley and Rosina Henley.

== Cast ==
- Carlyle Blackwell as Anthony 'Tony' Douglas / Calvin Douglas
- Evelyn Greeley as Marion Westervelt
- Rosina Henley as Olive Herrick
- George MacQuarrie as Douglas Sr.
- Arda La Croix as Hubert
- Henry West as Buck Comas
- Albert Gaston as Smiley Reilly
- Jack Drumier as Nichols
- Isabel O'Madigan as Mrs. Herrick
- Lettie Ford as Marion's Grandmother

== Bibliography ==
- Connelly, Robert B. The Silents: Silent Feature Films, 1910-36, Volume 40, Issue 2. December Press, 1998.
- Munden, Kenneth White. The American Film Institute Catalog of Motion Pictures Produced in the United States, Part 1. University of California Press, 1997.
