= Harry O. Hoyt =

American screenwriter, film director

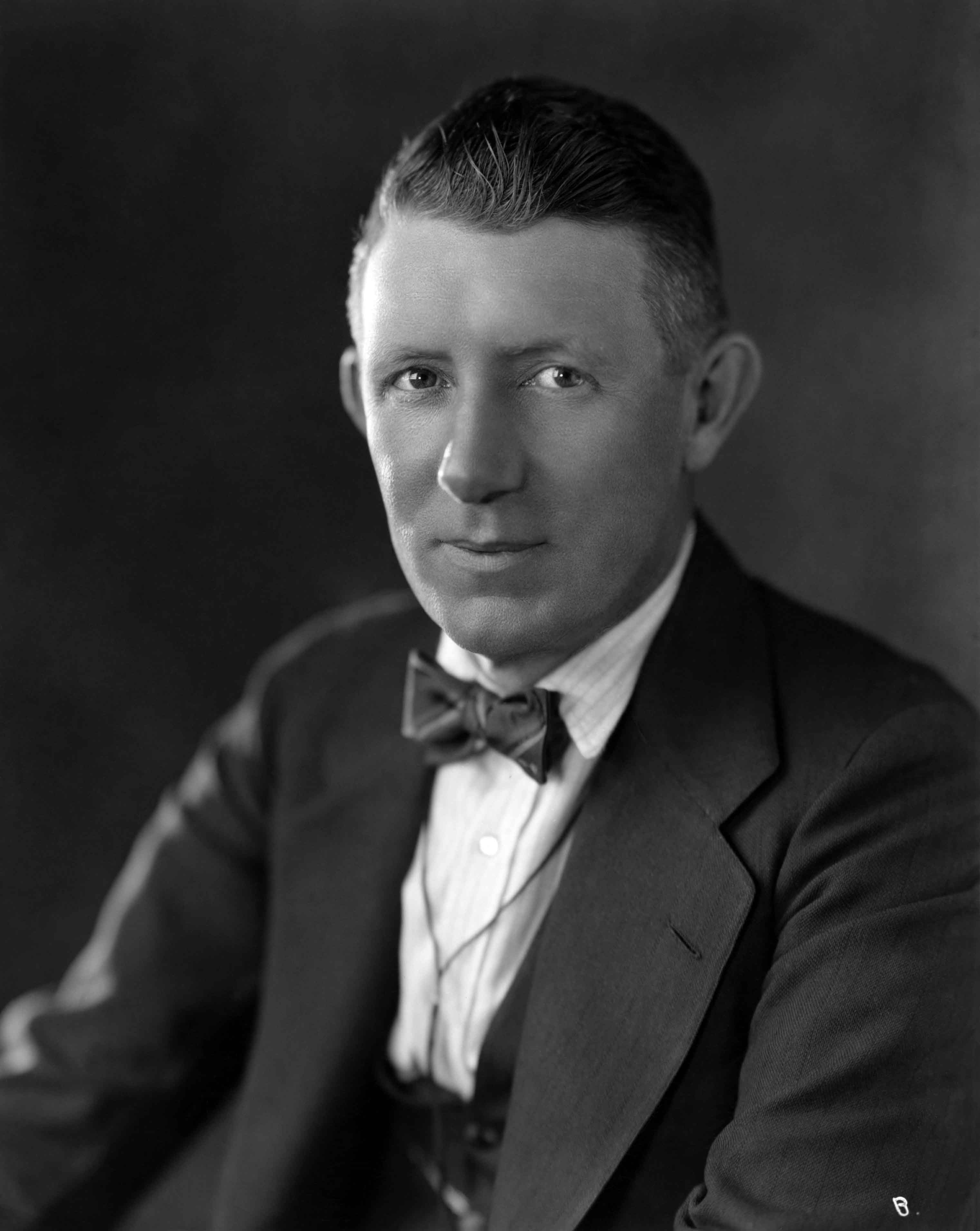
- Born: August 6, 1885; Minneapolis, Minnesota
- Died: July 29, 1961 (aged 75); Woodland Hills, Los Angeles, California
- Other name: Harry Hoyt
- Occupations: Screenwriter; Film director Scenarist
- Years active: 1913–1945
- Spouse: Florence Stark Hoyt (m. 1912)

Harry O. Hoyt (August 6, 1885 – July 29, 1961) was an American screenwriter and film director whose film career began in 1912, during the silent era. He graduated with a degree in literature from Yale University in 1910. His 1925 film The Lost World, based on the book by Arthur Conan Doyle, is notable as a pioneering effort in the use of stop-motion animation. His brother, actor Arthur Hoyt, also appeared in The Lost World.

In November 1912, he married the former Florence Stark in Norwich, Connecticut. Together they had a son, Devereux Gerrard Hoyt, and daughter Daryl Hoyt.

== Partial filmography ==
- Dimples (1916)
- The Child of Destiny (1916)
- The Moth (1917)
- The Road to France (1918)
- Hitting the Trail (1918)
- The Beloved Blackmailer (1918)
- By Hook or Crook (1918)
- The Rough Neck (1919)
- A Broadway Saint (1919)
- Courage for Two (1919)
- Daredevil Jack (1920)
- The Rider of the King Log (1921)
- Pardon My French (1921)
- The Curse of Drink (1922)
- That Woman (1922)
- The Woman on the Jury (1924)
- Sundown (1924)
- The Love Gamble (1925)
- The Unnamed Woman (1925)
- The Primrose Path (1925)
- The Lost World (1925)
- When Love Grows Cold (1926)
- The Belle of Broadway (1926)
- The Better Way (1926)
- The Adorable Deceiver (1926)
- Sweet Rosie O'Grady (1926)
- Wandering Girls (1927)
- The Kid Sister (1927)
- Painting the Town (1927)
- The Return of Boston Blackie (1927)
- Bitter Apples (1927)
- The Wizard (1927)
- The Clown (1927)
- The Count of Ten (1928)
- Good Morning, Judge (1928)
- The Passion Song (1928)
- The Rampant Age (1930)
- Second Honeymoon (1930)
- The Man from New Mexico (1932)
- Jungle Bride (1933)
- Clancy of the Mounted (1933)
- The Thrill Hunter (1933)
- The Fighting Ranger (1934)
- Headline Crasher (1936)
- Robin Hood, Jr. (1936)
- Jungle Menace (1937)
- The Last Stand (1938)
- Lady in the Death House (1944)
- A Fig Leaf for Eve (1944)
- The Missing Corpse (1945)
