= Love in a Hurry =

1919 film directed by Dell Henderson

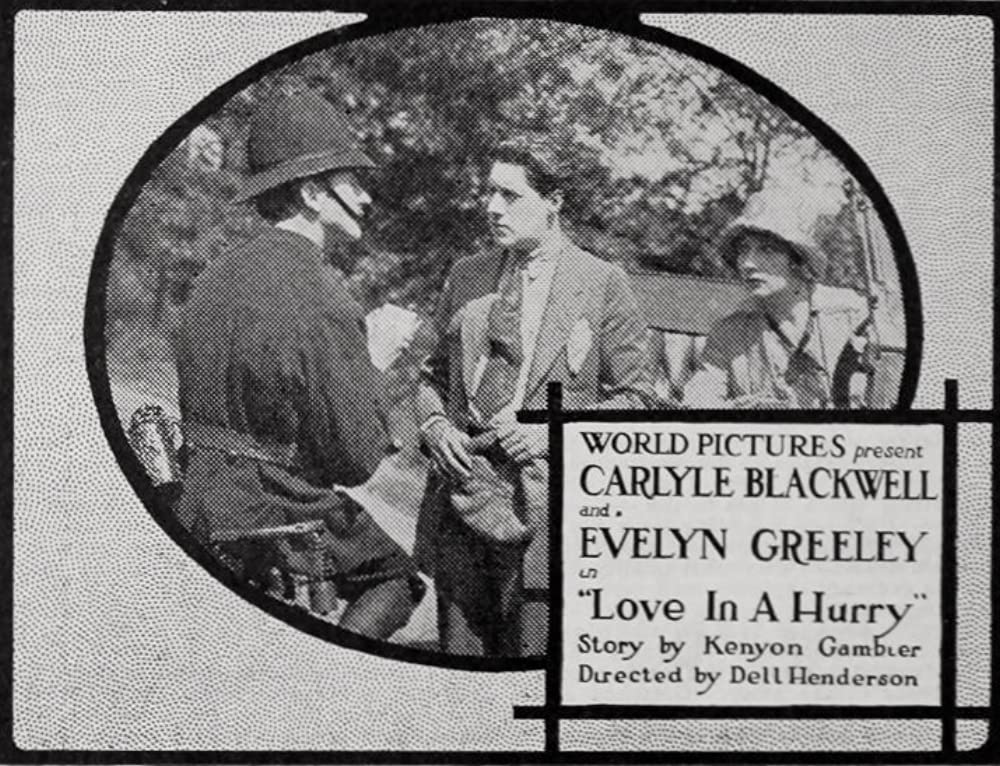
- Directed by: Dell Henderson
- Written by: Wallace Clifton
- Based on: A Huge One-Eyed Man by Kenyon Gambier
- Starring: Carlyle Blackwell; Evelyn Greeley; George MacQuarrie
- Cinematography: Lucien Tainguy
- Production company: World Film
- Distributed by: World Film
- Release date: January 13, 1919
- Running time: 50 minutes
- Country: United States
- Languages: Silent; English intertitles

Love in a Hurry is a 1919 American silent spy drama film directed by Dell Henderson and starring Carlyle Blackwell, Evelyn Greeley and George MacQuarrie. It is set in England during World War I.

== Cast ==
- Carlyle Blackwell as Charles Conant
- Evelyn Greeley as Lady Joan Templar
- Isabel O'Madigan as Lady Dartridge
- George MacQuarrie as George Templar
- William Bechtel as John Murr
- Kid Broad as Shorty
- Richard Collins as Captain
- Louis R. Grisel as Gardener
- Charles Dewey as Secret Service Man

== Bibliography ==
- Connelly, Robert B. The Silents: Silent Feature Films, 1910-36, Volume 40, Issue 2. December Press, 1998.
- Munden, Kenneth White. The American Film Institute Catalog of Motion Pictures Produced in the United States, Part 1. University of California Press, 1997.
