= Louis Ostland =

American cinematographer

- Died: September 9, 1918; Los Angeles, California, US
- Occupation: Cinematographer
- Spouse: Natalie May

Louis Ostland was an American cinematographer who was active in Hollywood during the silent era. He died of appendicitis on September 9, 1918, in Los Angeles, California. He was married to actress and model Natalie May (born Pearl Loewenberg), and had a son, William Ostland.

== Selected filmography ==
- Hitting the Trail (1918)
- The Road to France (1918)
- By Hook or Crook (1918)
- The Beloved Blackmailer (1918)
- The Golden Wall (1918)
- The Purple Lily (1918)
- The Wasp (1918)
- Her Hour (1917)
- Susan's Gentleman (1917)
- The Boy Girl (1917)
- The Honor of Mary Blake (1916)
- The Narrow Path (1916)
