= William T. Carleton =

English actor (1859–1930)

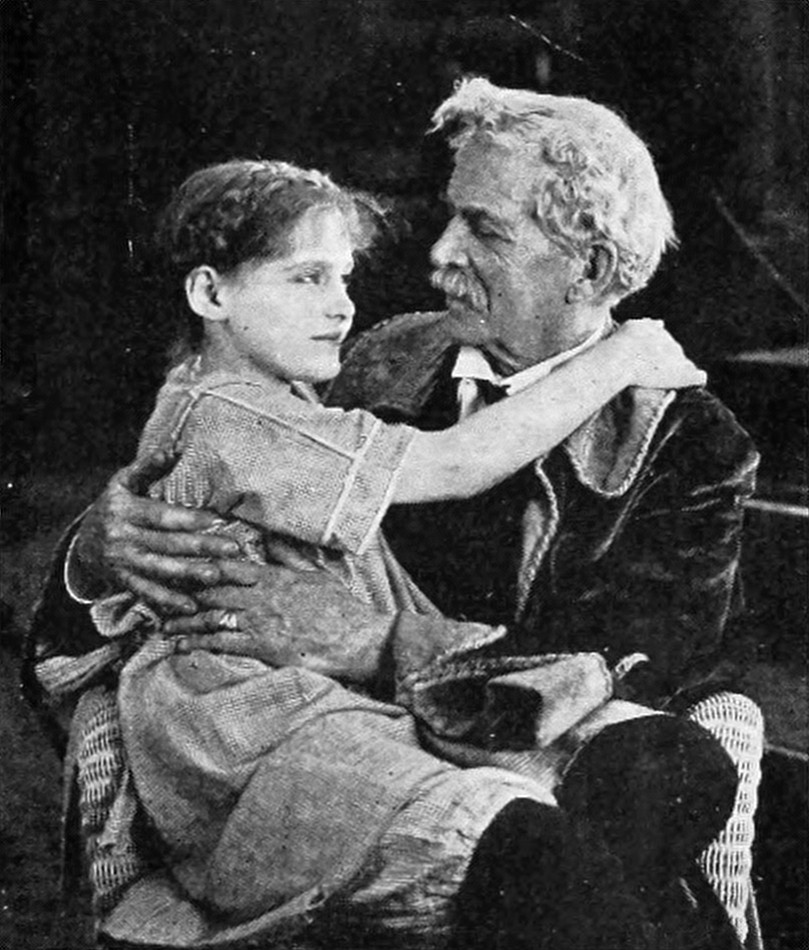
- Madge Evans and William T. Carleton, Home Wanted (1919)
- Born: 1859; England
- Died: September 28, 1930 (aged 70–71); Saint John, New Brunswick, Canada
- Other names: William Carleton; W. T. Carleton
- Occupations: actor, producer
- Years active: 1914-1926

William T. Carleton (1859–1930) was an English-born actor, and producer. He died in Saint John, New Brunswick, Canada, in 1930. Some sources erroneously list him as being related to William P. Carleton, another actor. He is also not to be mistaken for another William T. Carleton, an opera singer who died in 1922.

== Filmography ==
- Fantasma (1914)
- The Idler (1914)
- The Fairy and the Waif (1915)
- The Pardon (1915)*short
- Larry O'Neill - Gentleman (1915)*short
- The Running Fight (1915)
- The Incorrigible Dukane (1915)
- Madame Butterfly (1915)
- The Greater Will (1915)
- Poor Little Peppina (1916)
- Gloria's Romance (1916)
- Pearl of the Army (1916) (as W.T. Carleton)
- At First Sight (1917) (as W.T. Carlton)
- Fighting Odds (1917)
- A Daughter of Maryland (1917) (as William T. Carlton)
- Sunshine Alley (1917) (as W.T. Carleton)
- The Antics of Ann (1917) (as W.T. Carleton)
- Scandal (1917)
- Tempered Steel (1918) (as William Carleton)
- The Heart of a Girl (1918)
- The Danger Mark (1918)
- The Beloved Blackmailer (1918)
- Everybody's Girl (1918)
- The Better Half (1918)
- The Racing Strain (1918)
- Eye for Eye (1918)
- The Love Net (1918)
- The Lion and the Mouse (1919) (as W.T. Carlton)
- The World to Live in (1919)
- Almost Married (1919) (as W.T. Carleton)
- The Avalanche (1919)
- Home Wanted (1919) (as W.T. Carleton)
- His Father's Wife (1919) (as W.T. Carleton)
- Me and Captain Kidd (1919) (as W.T. Carleton)
- Human Collateral (1920)
- His Temporary Wife (1920) (as W.T. Carleton)
- Sinners (1920)
