= Dell Henderson =

Canadian-American actor, director, and writer (1877–1956)

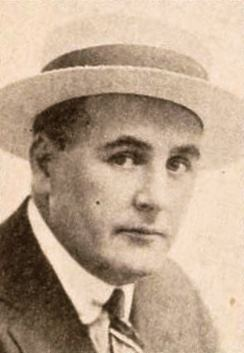
- Exhibitors Herald, 1920
- Born: George Adelbert Henderson; July 5, 1877; St. Thomas, Ontario, Canada
- Died: December 2, 1956 (aged 79); Hollywood, California, United States
- Other names: Del Henderson; Arthur Buchanan
- Years active: 1908-1950
- Spouse: Florence Lee (?-1956) (his death)

George Adelbert "Dell" Henderson (July 5, 1877 – December 2, 1956) was a Canadian-American actor, director, and writer. He began his long and prolific film career in the early days of silent film.

== Biography ==
Born in the southwestern Ontario city of St. Thomas, Dell Henderson started his acting career on the stage, but appeared in his first movie Monday Morning in a Coney Island Police Court in 1908. Henderson was a frequent associate of film pioneer D. W. Griffith since 1909 and appeared in numerous early Griffith shorts in Hollywood. Henderson also acted on a less prolific basis in the movies of producer Mack Sennett at Keystone Studios. In addition to acting, Henderson directed nearly 200 silent films between 1911 and 1928. Most of those films are forgotten or lost, but he also directed movies with silent stars like Harry Carey and Roscoe Arbuckle. Henderson also worked as a writer on numerous screenplays.

After retiring from directing in 1927, Henderson returned to acting full time and played important supporting roles in King Vidor's The Crowd (1928) and as General Marmaduke Pepper in Show People (1928). The advent of sound film damaged Henderson's acting career, and he often had to play smaller roles. In the 1930s, he appeared on several occasions as a comic foil for such comedians as The Three Stooges, Charley Chase, W. C. Fields and Laurel and Hardy. He often played somewhat pompous figures like judges, businessmen, detectives or mayors. Modern audiences will remember Henderson as the annoyed hospital president Dr. Graves in The Three Stooges film Men in Black (1934) and the put-upon chaperone in the Our Gang film Choo-Choo! (1932). He also appeared as a night court judge in Laurel and Hardy's Our Relations (1936) and as a friendly car salesman in Leo McCarey's drama Make Way for Tomorrow (1937). Henderson ended his film career after numerous small roles in 1950. He did make one final appearance on NBC-TV's "This Is Your Life" on March 10, 1954, during a tribute to Mack Sennett.

Henderson died at the age of 79 of a heart attack in Hollywood. He was married to actress Florence Lee until his death. The couple made several silent films together.

== Selected filmography ==
- Monday Morning in a Coney Island Police Court (1908, film debut)
- The Two Brothers (1910, Short) – Manuel
- A Romance of the Western Hills (1910, Short) – Tourist
- Ramona (1910, Short) – Man at Burial
- The Unchanging Sea (1910, Short) – The Rescuer
- In the Border States (1910, Short) – Union Officer (uncredited)
- The Modern Prodigal (1910)
- His Trust (1911, Short) – Colonel Frazier
- His Trust Fulfilled (1911, Short)
- Was He a Coward? (1911, Short) – The Foreman
- The Lonedale Operator (1911, Short) – 1st Tramp
- Enoch Arden (1911, Short) – Rescuer
- The Primal Call (1911, Short) – The Creditor
- The Last Drop of Water (1911, Short) – Minor Role
- The Making of a Man (1911, Short) – The Leading Man
- Love in the Hills (1911, Short, Writer)
- The Battle (1911, Short) – A Union Officer (uncredited)
- Katchem Kate (1912)
- For His Son (1912, Short) – Dopokoke Factory Employee (uncredited)
- A String of Pearls (1912, Short) – The Millionaire
- A Voice from the Deep (1912, Short) – On Roller Coaster (uncredited)
- Help! Help! (1912, Short) – Office Worker
- A Dash Through the Clouds (1912, Writer)
- A Girl's Stratagem (1913, Short) – A Loafer
- Red Hicks Defies the World (1913, Director)
- The Mothering Heart (1913, Short) – Club Patron (uncredited)
- Black and White (1913, Director)
- A Modest Hero (1913, Director)
- The Battle at Elderbush Gulch (1913, Short)
- Almost a Wild Man (1913, Director)
- Our Country Cousin (1914, Director)
- Among the Mourners (1914, Director)
- Intolerance (1916) – Extra (uncredited)
- Outcast (1917, Director)
- The Beautiful Adventure (1917, Director)
- Her Second Husband (1917, Director)
- The Road to France (1918, Director)
- By Hook or Crook (1918, Director)
- Hitting the Trail (1918, Director)
- The Beloved Blackmailer (1918, Director)
- The Golden Wall (1918, Director)
- Courage for Two (1919, Director)
- Three Green Eyes (1919, Director)
- Love in a Hurry (1919, Director)
- The Social Pirate (1919, director)
- The Shark (1920, Director)
- The Servant Question (1920, Director)
- The Plunger (1920, Director)
- The Dead Line (1920, Director)
- Dynamite Allen (1921, Director)
- Dead or Alive (1921, Director)
- The Girl from Porcupine (1921, Director)
- Sure Fire Flint (1922, Director)
- Jacqueline (1923, Director)
- The Love Bandit (1924, Director)
- The Bad Lands (1925, Director)
- Accused (1925, Director)
- Pursued (1925, Director)
- The Pay-Off (1926, Director)
- The Clinging Vine (1926) – B. Harvey Doolittle
- Getting Gertie's Garter (1927) – Barry Scott
- The Crowd (1928) – Dick
- The Patsy (1928) – Pa Harrington
- Three-Ring Marriage (1928) – Gangster
- Show People (1928) – Colonel Pepper
- The Power of the Press (1928) – Bill Johnson
- Riley the Cop (1928) – Judge Coronelli (uncredited)
- Wrong Again (1929, Short) – Painting Owner
- The College Coquette (1929) – Mr. Forrester – Betty's Father (uncredited)
- Hit the Deck (1929) – Admiral
- The Sins of the Children (1930) – Ted Baldwin
- Playthings of Hollywood (1930)
- Dixiana (1930) – Society Man in Theater Box (uncredited)
- The Laurel-Hardy Murder Case (1930, Short) – Housekeeper (uncredited)
- Thundering Tenors (1930, Short with Charley Chase) – Senator D.H. Henderson
- Helping Grandma (1931, Short) – Henderson, Chain store official
- The Easiest Way (1931) – Bud Williams (uncredited)
- Bad Company (1931) – Kingston Hotel Resident (uncredited)
- The Champ (1931) – The Doctor (uncredited)
- You're Telling Me! (1934)
- The Old Fashioned Way (1934)
- The Lemon Drop Kid (1934)
- The Captain Hates the Sea (1934)
- Mrs. Wiggs of the Cabbage Patch (1934)
- It's a Gift (1934)
- Ruggles of Red Gap (1935)
- Diamond Jim (1935)
- Steamboat Round the Bend (1935)
- A Message to Garcia (1936)
- Poppy (1936)
- Our Relations (1936)
- The Awful Truth (1937)
- Wells Fargo (1937)
- Arsène Lupin Returns (1938)
- Men with Wings (1938)
- Love Affair (1939)
- Frontier Marshal (1939)
- 5th Ave Girl (1939)
- Abe Lincoln in Illinois (1940)
- Millionaires in Prison (1940)
- Stranger on the Third Floor (1940)
- Young People (1940)
- Blossoms in the Dust (1941)
- Look Who's Laughing (1941)
- The Major and the Minor (1942)
- Once Upon a Honeymoon (1942)
- Du Barry Was a Lady (1943)
- Wilson (1944)
- Casanova Brown (1944)
- The Big Noise (1944)
- Nothing But Trouble (1944)
- Abbott and Costello in Hollywood (1945)
- Undercurrent (1946)
- The Romance of Rosy Ridge (1947)
- Big City (1948)
- State of the Union (1948)
- Big Jack (1949)
- Annie Get Your Gun (1950)
- Shadow on the Wall (1950)
- Louisa (1950, final film)
