= The Master Mind (1914 film) =

1914 film by Cecil B. DeMille, Oscar Apfel

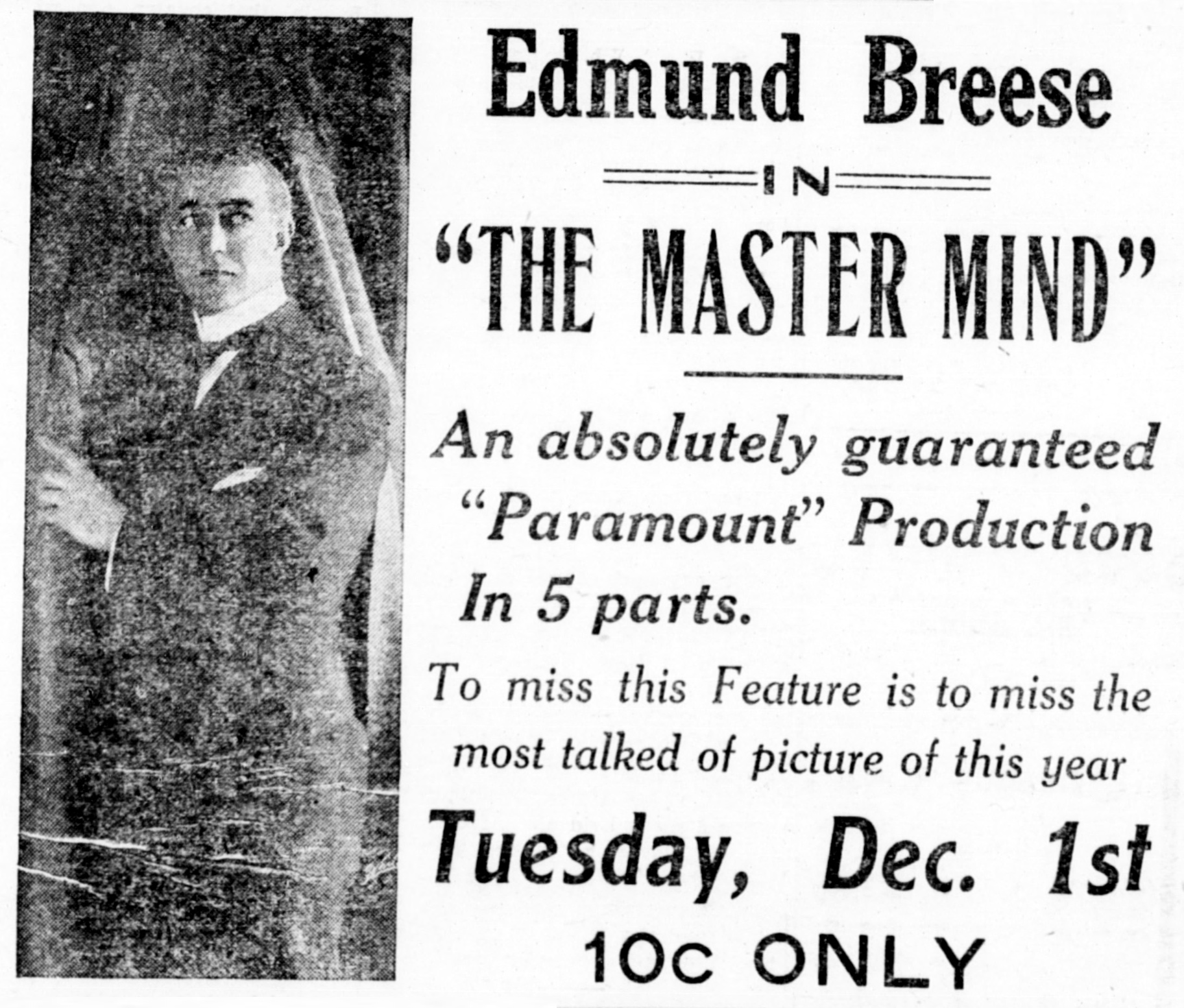
- Newspaper advertisement, 1914
- Directed by: Oscar Apfel; Cecil B. DeMille (uncredited)
- Written by: Clara Beranger (scenario)
- Story by: David Daniel Cohen
- Based on: The Master Mind by Daniel D. Carter
- Starring: Edmund Breese
- Production company: Jesse L. Lasky Feature Play Company
- Distributed by: Paramount Pictures
- Release date: May 11, 1914
- Country: United States
- Languages: Silent; English intertitles

The Master Mind is a 1914 American silent crime/drama film released by Paramount Pictures, directed by Oscar Apfel and Cecil B. DeMille and stars Edmund Breese. The film is based on the play of the same name by Daniel D. Carter.

== Overview ==
The plot revolves around a defense attorney who, unable to obtain the acquittal of an innocent young man, concocts a complicated and diabolical scheme to revenge himself upon the prosecutor.

== Cast ==
- Edmund Breese as Richard Allen
- Fred Montague as Henry Allen
- Jane Darwell as Milwaukee Sadie
- Dick La Reno as Blount
- Harry Fisher as Diamond Willie
- Mabel Van Buren as Lucine, Three-Arm Fanny
- Richard La Strang as Safe Blower
- Monroe Salisbury as District attorney
- Billy Elmer as Creegan

== Preservation ==
With no prints of The Master Mind located in any film archives, it is considered a lost film.

== See also ==
- List of American films of 1914
