= Evelyn Greeley =

Austrian-born actress (1888–1975)

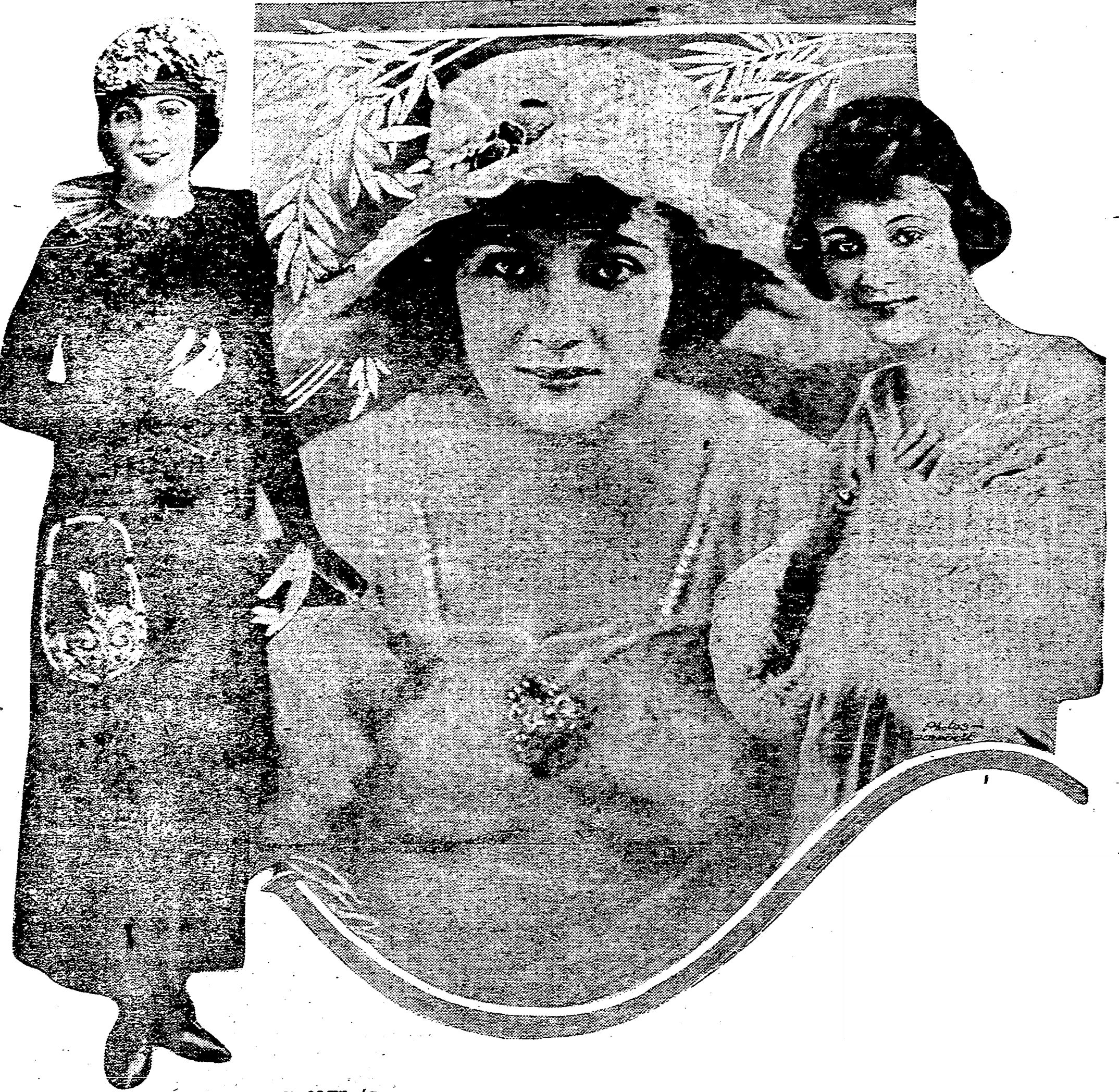
Three images of Greeley from 1918

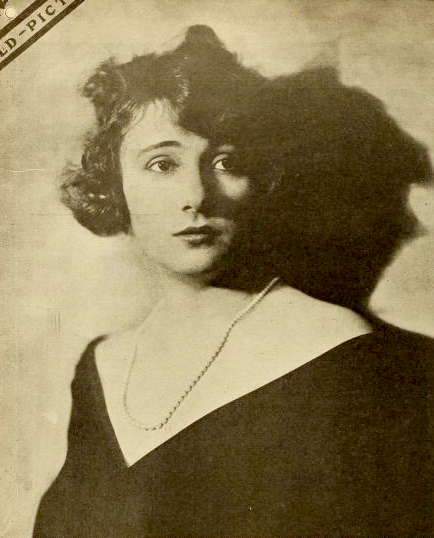
Greeley in 1919

Evelyn Greeley (1888–1975) was an Austrian-born American actress in silent films. She appeared in approximately 30 films from 1915 to 1922.

== Early life and education ==
Evelyn Greeley was born on November 3, 1888, in Austria. She was the daughter of Stefan Mahorko (Marko, Marquo) born in Nondorf, Austria, and Fannie Huber born in Csaktornya, Hungary. Contemporary publicity incorrectly called her the granddaughter of Horace Greeley, and gave her place of birth as Lexington, Kentucky; she actually immigrated from Bremen, Germany to Baltimore, Maryland under the name Emilie Mahorko on the S.S. Munchen on September 1, 1897, with her mother and five siblings: Adeline, William, Frances, Lucille and Frank. Later, three more siblings, Marion, Audrey and Juanita were born in Chicago. Her death certificate reverses her parents' surnames to Stephen Huber and Frances Marko.

Greeley is said to have attended the Frances Shimer Academy, now known as Shimer College, and the University School for Girls in Chicago, but some researchers have regarded this account of her education as simply another part of her "fictional life story".

== Acting career ==
Greeley began her acting career on the stage, touring with the "Poli Players" stock company of Sylvester Z. Poli. She began working in film in 1914, for the Chicago-based Essanay Studios, doing bit parts. It was only after more than a year that she obtained her first credit line, in the Quality Pictures production The Second in Command.

Greeley's career peaked in the years 1917–19, when she was under contract to the World Film Corporation, and starred opposite Carlyle Blackwell in numerous films. Her contract with World Film ended in 1920, and in the ensuing years she appeared in pictures produced by several different companies.

== Filmography ==
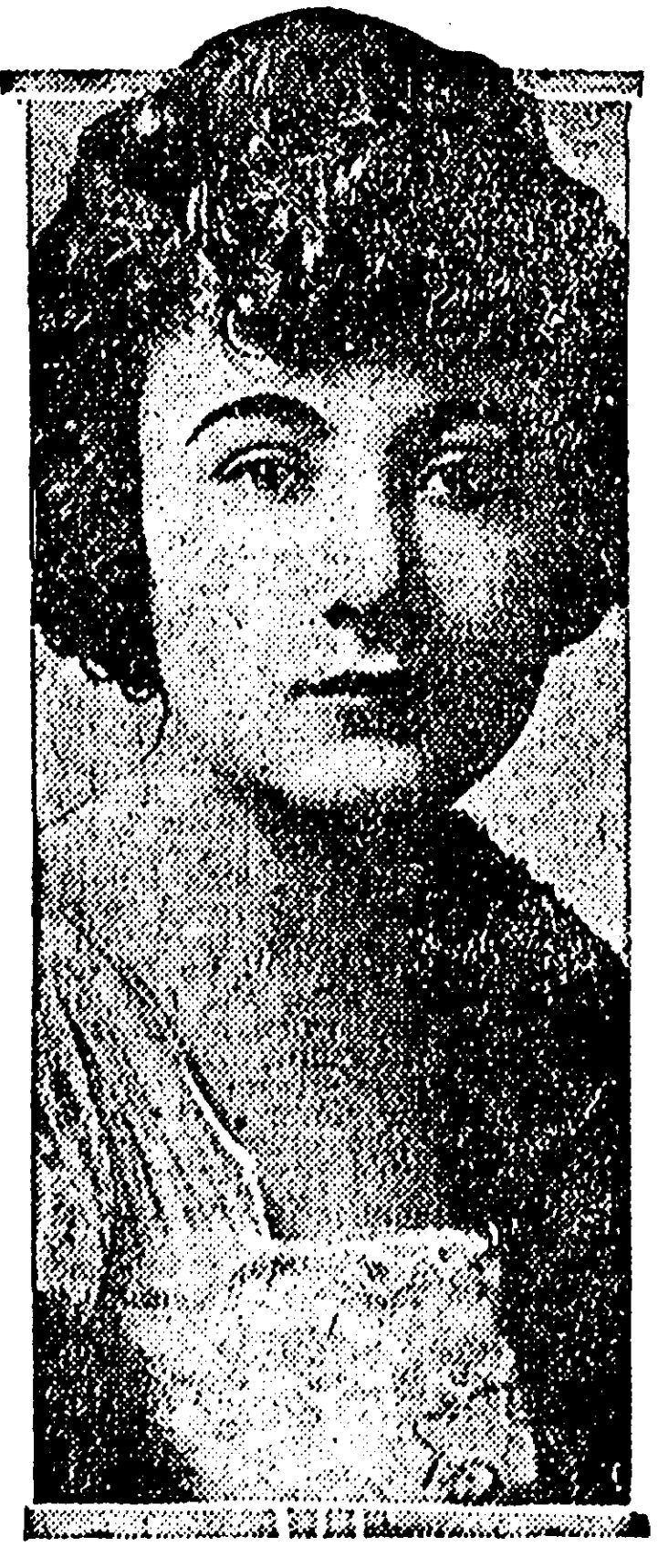
Greeley in 1922.

- The Fable of One Samaritan Who Got Paralysis of the Helping Hand (1914) *short
- The Second in Command (1915)
- A Daughter of the Sea (1915)
- Tempest and Sunshine (1916)
- Just a Song at Twilight (1916)
- The Social Leper (1917)
- The Price of Pride (1917)
- The Brand of Satan (1917)
- The Burglar (1917)
- The Good for Nothing (1917)
- The Beautiful Mrs. Reynolds (1918)
- His Royal Highness (1918)
- Leap to Fame (1918)
- The Golden Wall (1918)
- The Beloved Blackmailer (1918)
- By Hook or Crook (1918)
- The Road to France (The Allies) (1918)
- Hitting the Trail (1918)
- Love in a Hurry (1919)
- Courage for Two (1919)
- Hit or Miss (1919 film)
- Three Green Eyes (1919)
- Phil for Short (1919)
- Bringing Up Betty (1919)
- The Oakdale Affair (1919)
- Me and Captain Kidd (1919)
- His Greatest Sacrifice (1921)
- Diane of Star Hollow (1921)
- A Pasteboard Crown (1922)
- Bulldog Drummond (1922)

== Personal life and death ==
Greeley, who had been billed in the newspapers as the "most proposed-to woman in America", married for the first time to John Smiley on October 25, 1922. Smiley is variously identified as a fellow actor or a steel company executive.

On November 5, 1928, Greeley became the wife of businessman James Henry Rand. Rand and Greeley divorced in September 1960, charging one another with cruelty. She married Harold Charles Heermann in January 1962, and Morgan Smith Laity after 1965.

Greeley died in West Palm Beach, Florida on March 25, 1975. She was survived by her husband Morgan.
