= Florence Lee (born 1888) =

American actress

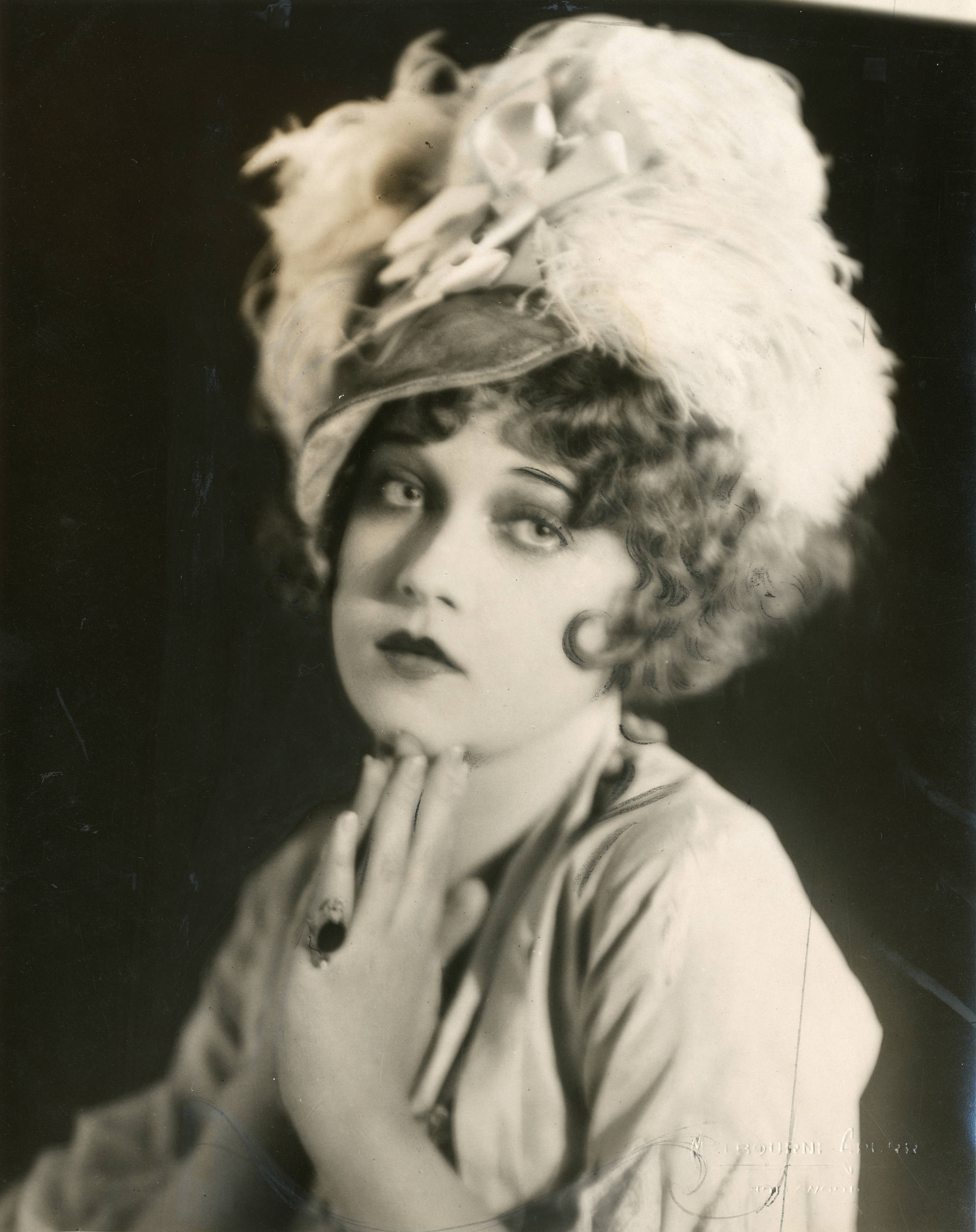
- Lee in 1925
- Born: March 12, 1888; Jamaica, Vermont, United States
- Died: September 1, 1962 (aged 74); Hollywood, California, United States
- Occupation: Actress
- Years active: 1921–1929
- Spouse: Dell Henderson

Florence Lee (March 12, 1888 – September 1, 1962) was an American actress of the silent era, who appeared in 22 films between 1921 and 1929. She was married to Canadian-American actor, director, and writer Dell Henderson and played in many films that he directed.

Florence Lee was born in Jamaica, Vermont and died in Hollywood, California at the age of 74.

== Partial filmography ==
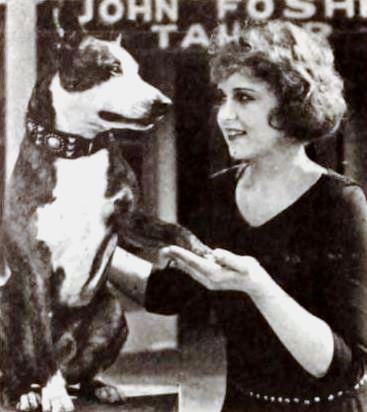
Florence Lee and Brownie the Dog in 1921

- Seeing is Believing (1921)
- Custard's Last Stand (1921)
- Tee Time (1921)
- The Way of a Man (1924)
