= The Galley Slave (1915 film) =

1915 film directed by J. Gordon Edwards

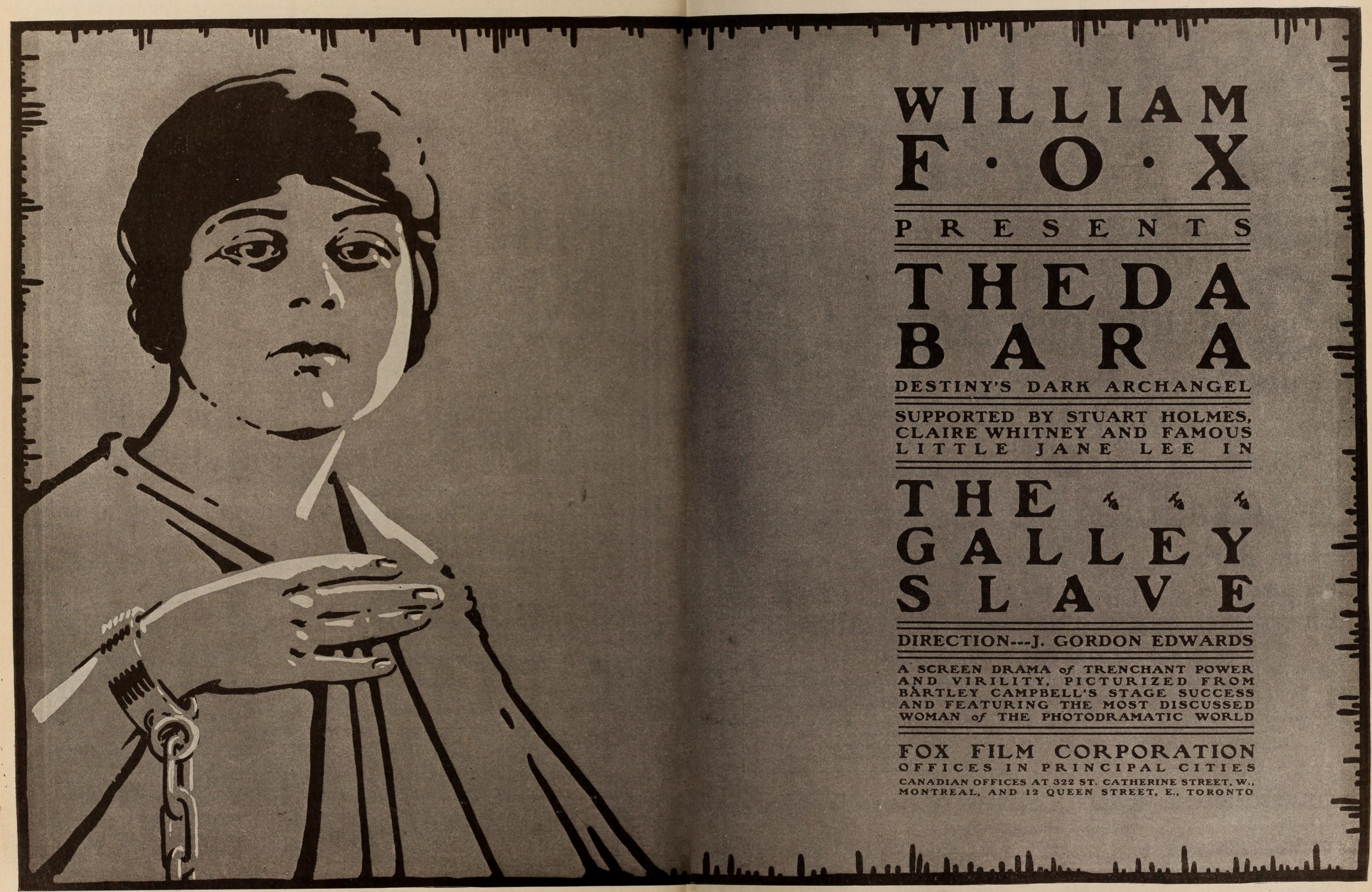
- Advertisement in a magazine
- Directed by: J. Gordon Edwards
- Written by: Clara S. Beranger (scenario); Rex Ingram
- Based on: The Galley Slave by Bartley Campbell
- Produced by: William Fox
- Starring: Theda Bara; Stuart Holmes
- Distributed by: Fox Film Corporation
- Release date: November 28, 1915
- Running time: 5 reels
- Country: United States
- Language: Silent with English intertitles

The Galley Slave is a 1915 American silent drama film directed by J. Gordon Edwards and starring Theda Bara. Based on the play of the same name by Bartley Campbell, the film's scenario was written by Clara S. Beranger.

== Cast ==
- Theda Bara as Francesca Brabaut
- Stuart Holmes as Antoine Brabaut
- Claire Whitney as Cecil Blaine
- Lillian Lawrence as Mrs. Blaine
- Jane Lee as Dolores
- Hardee Kirkland as Baron La Bois

== Preservation ==
With no prints of The Galley Slave located in any film archives, it is considered a lost film.

== See also ==
- List of lost films
- 1937 Fox vault fire
