= Carl Sauerman =

Swedish-born actor (1868–1924)

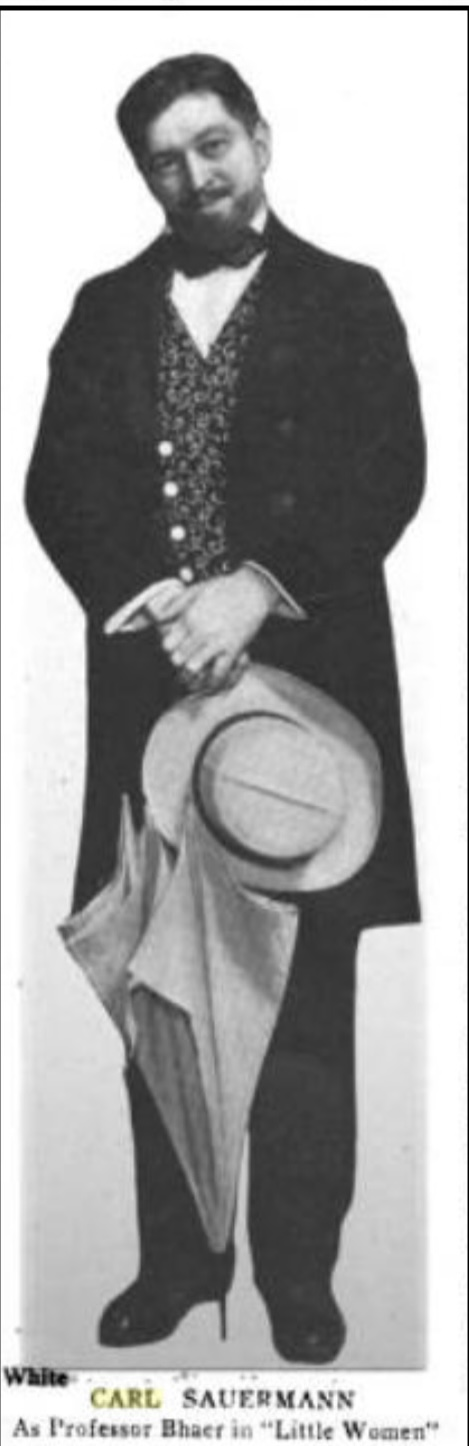

Carl Sauerman (c. 1868, Stockholm – 9 April 1924, Brooklyn, New York) was a Swedish-born actor of the stage and screen. He began his career as a leading stage actor in Berlin before moving to New York City in 1908 to become a member of the German-language theatre company at the Irving Place Theatre. He is best remembered for creating the role of Professor Friedrich Bhaer in the original production of Marian de Forest's Little Women; an immensely popular stage adaptation of Louisa May Alcott's novel of the same that played on Broadway and toured the United States in 1912–1913. In addition to starring in plays on Broadway, he was a silent film actor.

== Life and career ==
Born c. 1868 in Stockholm, Sweden, Sauerman was trained as an actor in Germany. Prior to coming to the United States, he was a leading actor at the Lessing Theater in Berlin under Otto Brahm and also acted in plays in that city under the direction of Max Reinhardt. In 1908 he relocated to New York City to join the resident group of stage actors at the Irving Place Theatre; a theatre which specialized in performing works in the German-language. Along with Eugen Burg and Hedwiga Reicher, he was a top-billed star of this company, and toured to other American cities to perform German-language plays in addition to the company's regular season in New York. He continued to appear regularly at the Irving Place Theatre for several years.

In 1909 Sauerman toured the United States with a troupe managed by Henry B. Harris in Channing Pollock's Such A Little Queen. In 1910 he starred in Charles T. Dazy's The Old Flute Players at the Majestic Theatre in Chicago. In 1911 he created the role of Herr Otto von Maxhausen in the world premiere of George Ade's four act comedy U.S. Minister Bedlow at the National Theatre in Washington, D.C. with William H. Crane in the title part.

In 1912 Sauerman was cast by Jessie Bonstelle as Professor Friedrich Bhaer in the original production of Marian de Forest's Little Women; an immensely popular stage adaptation of Louisa May Alcott's novel of the same. The play also starred the actress Marie Pavey as Jo March and premiered at the Teck Theatre in Buffalo, New York on January 22, 1912, in a production directed by Bonstelle and produced by William A. Brady. The play toured the United States and went through multiple alterations before it ultimately reached Broadway nine months later. Its Broadway premiere was Saureman's Broadway debut, and it occurred at the Playhouse Theatre on October 14, 1912; playing for a total of 184 performances. A critical and financial success, Sauerman continued to tour nationally in the play after the Broadway run concluded.

Saureman later returned to Broadway as Baron von Loewe in David Belasco's production of Horace Hodges and Thomas Wigney Percyval's Little Lady in Blue at the Belasco Theatre in 1916–1917. His final Broadway show was as the patriarch Mr. Hartmann in Prince and Princess Troubetzkoy's war drama Allegiance at the Maxine Elliott's Theatre in 1918.

In addition to his work in the theatre, Sauerman starred in several silent films. These include the roles of Jacques Sequrin in The Beautiful Adventure (1917), the Baron in My Wife (1918), Henry Steinmetz in The American Way (1919), and Jacob Ackerman in The Black Circle (1919).

Carl Sauerman died in Brooklyn, New York on April 9, 1924.
