= Marie Pavey =

American stage actress

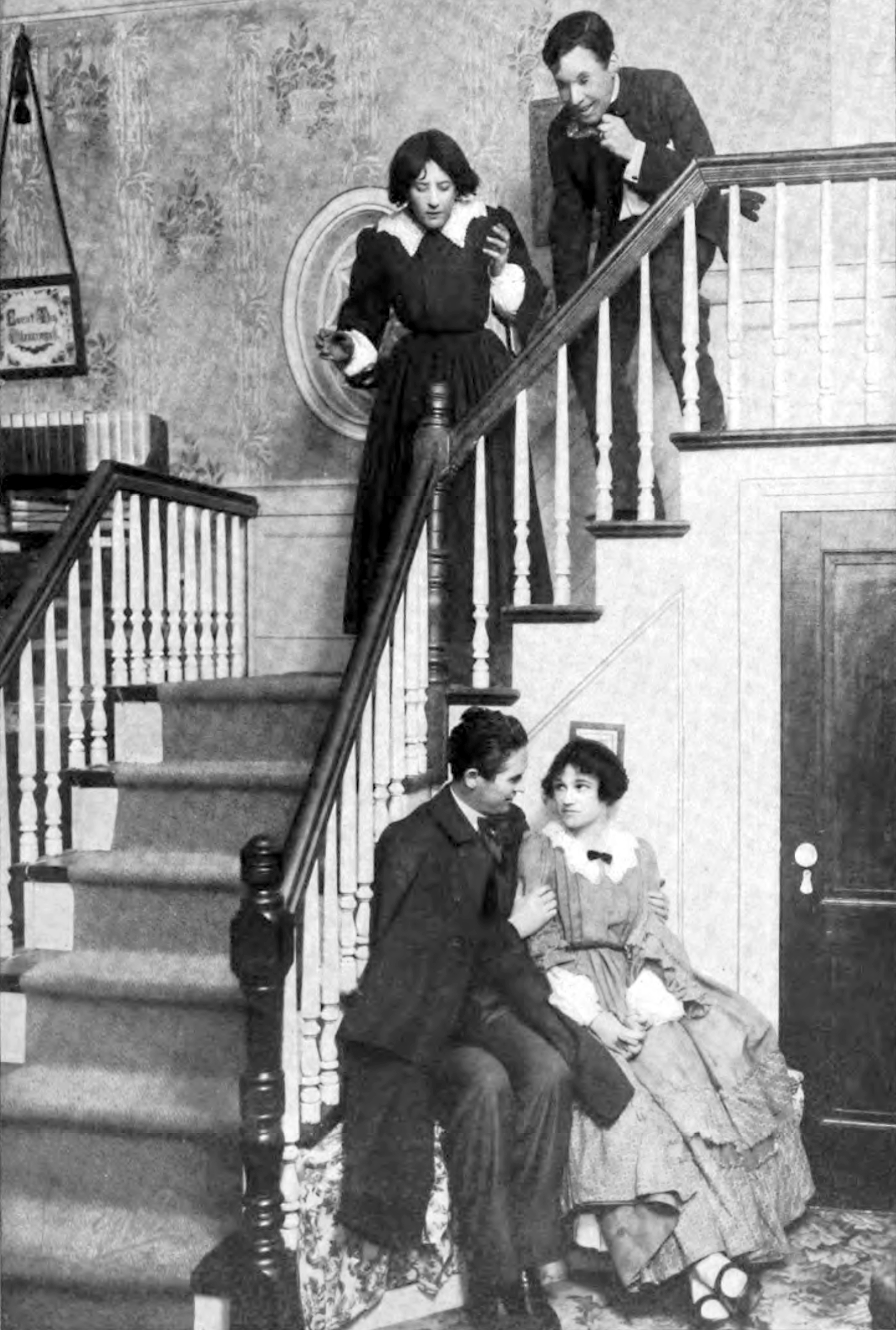
Photograph of a scene from the 1912 Broadway production of Little Women. Subjects at top of stairs: Marie Pavey (Jo), Donald McLaren (Laurie) Subjects seated: John Cromwell (John Brooke), Alice Brady (Meg)

Marie Pavey, born Emma Marie Pavey, (September 1881 – c. 1947) was an American stage actress and vaudeville performer who had an active career in the United States during the first four decades of the twentieth century. Trained as an actress in Chicago, she began her career in that city in 1900. In her early career she toured widely in vaudeville as a stage partner to Bert Coote.

Pavey's first major success as an actress was as Mabel Gray in A. H. Woods The Gambler of the West; a role she performed on tour in the United States and in Canada from 1906 through 1908. She is best known for creating the role of Jo March in the original production of Marian de Forest's Little Women; a play adapted from the novel by Louisa May Alcott. Pavey performed the role on Broadway in 1912 and toured nationally in the production for several years. She remained active on the American stage as late as 1937. She was reported missing and possibly dead in 1947, and a follow-up report in 1948 stated she was likely dead.

== Education and early career ==
Emma Marie Pavey was the daughter of George and Marie Pavey. She was born in September 1881 in Grand Rapids, Michigan, and during her early childhood she moved to Chicago with her family. She graduated from the School of Acting at the Chicago Musical College in the Spring of 1900 where she studied acting with Hart Conway.

Pavey made her professional stage debut in Chicago in February 1900 with the Herbert Kelcey—Effie Shannon Theatre Company in Clyde Fitch's The Moth and the Flame. She then toured in vaudeville with Bert Coote's company; portraying Angelica opposite Coote as Oscar in his one act comedy Supper For Two in theatres in Brooklyn (1900), Boston (1900 and 1901), Buffalo (1900), New York City (1900), Philadelphia (1901), and Atlanta (1901) among other locations. The Boston Globe in its review of the production stated that "Miss Pavey is an animated actress and makes a capitol foil to Mr. Coote's quiet and dry methods."

In December 1901 Pavey created the role of Ruby Redgrave in the world premiere of Max Goldberg's The Rich and Poor of London at the Standard Theatre in Philadelphia. She was seen in several more plays at that theatre in 1902 including the roles of Celeste in George H. Jessop's Sam'l of Posen; or, The Commercial Drummer and Selina Khor in the world premiere of Louis Eagan's Slaves of Russia. She then returned to Chicago in August and September 1902 for performances at the New American Theatre where she first appeared in the military drama Heart of Virginia. This was followed by the roles of Anna in Leah the Forsaken and Nina Chauncey in A False Friend. In October 1902 she performed at the Lyceum Theater in Minneapolis as Nell in The Lost Paradise.

Pavey toured the United States as a leading actress with first the Grace Hayward Company in late 1902, and then the Ferris Stock Company in 1903. She returned to Hayward's company in September 1903, and remained committed to touring with that company in 1904. In`1905 she was once again a member of the Ferris Stock Company; performing mainly with that organization in Omaha.

== The Gambler of the West and work in stock theatre ==
From 1906-1908 Pavey had the first major success of her career when she toured North America as the heroine Mabel Gray in A. H. Woods The Gambler of the West; a role she first performed in that play's world premiere at the American Theater in Buffalo, New York in August 1906. She received consistently positive reviews as the romantic lead opposite David Landau who portrayed the title role. Stops on the tour included performances at the West End Theatre in Manhattan, the Grand Opera House in Boston, the Grand Opera House in Brooklyn, the Girard Theatre in Philadelphia, the Holliday Street Theater in Baltimore, the Krug Theater in Omaha, the Park Theatre in Indianapolis, the Majestic Theatre in Toronto, and several theaters owned by the Bijou Amusement Company including Bijou Theatres in Nashville, Brooklyn, Chattanooga, Minneapolis, and Pittsburgh among other locations. The tour ended in the city where it began almost two years earlier; closing after performances given at the Academy of Music in Buffalo, New York in May 1908.

After The Gambler of the West tour closed, Pavey joined the roster of resident players of Keith's Theatre Stock Company in Portland, Maine; making her debut with the company as Minnie in David Belasco's The Girl of the Golden West with Sidney Toler as Dick Johnson on July 4, 1908. Other repertoire she performed with the company included Nance Olden in Channing Pollock's In the Bishop's Carriage, and Eileen MacLane in Rida Johnson Young's The Boys of Company B. In 1909 she was the headliner for the Jefferson Theater in Memphis, and returned to Portland, Maine for performances as Jo in Augustin Daly's The Lottery of Love, Nellie Collins in Hermann Sudermann's Honour, and Elspeth Tyrell in Evelyn Greenleaf Sutherland and Beulah Marie Dix's The Road to Yesterday. In September 1909 she portrayed the title role in Zaza at the Bush Temple of Music in Chicago, and soon after starred at that same theater in a stage adaptation of Augusta Jane Evans Wilson's novel St. Elmo.

In 1910 Pavey was hired as the resident headlining actress at the Bijou Theatre in Brooklyn; making her debut with the company as the romantic lead in Langdon Elwyn Mitchell's The New York Idea opposite Corse Payton. She portrayed Payton's love interest in several more plays at that theatre, including roles in Paul Armstrong's Going Some and Winchell Smith's Brewster's Millions. Other parts she portrayed at that theatre included Agnes Rodman in Belasco's Men and Women, Mrs. Guyer in the musical A Trip to Chinatown, Elinor Hillary in Olive Porter's The Ringmaster, Eleanor Downs in David Higgins and Baldwin G. Cooke's His Last Dollar, Fifi Oraton Ki in William Gillette's All the Comforts of Home, Mabel Wilson in Theodore Kremer's The Fatal Wedding, Edna Kingsly in Kremer's For her children's sake, and the title role in Alexandre Dumas's Camille.

== Jessie Bonstelle and Little Women ==
In December 1910 Pavey met director Jessie Bonstelle when she was hired for performances during the Christmas season at the Nesbitt Theatre in Wilkes Barre, Pennsylvania; making her debut with the Nesbitt Players as the Dominican nun Giovanna in Francis Marion Crawford and Walter Hackett's The White Sister. Bonstelle was the director of the Nebitt Players and Pavey remained with the company as their resident lead actress in the following year. Roles she performed with the Nesbitt Players in 1911 under Bonstelle's direction included Marion Stanton in Thompson Buchanan's A Woman's Way, Frank Ware in Rachel Crothers's A Man's World, Nat-u-ritch in Edwin Milton Royle's The Squaw Man, and the title role in Israel Zangwill's Merely Mary Ann.

Bonstelle spent eight years trying to obtain the rights to Louisa May Alcott's novel Little Women; ultimately obtaining permission from the Alcott family in 1910. She approached the playwright Marian de Forest to adapt the work for her. Bonstelle cast Pavey in the critical role of Jo March, and the play premiered at the Teck Theatre in Buffalo, New York on January 22, 1912, in a production directed by Bonstelle and produced by William A. Brady.

Little Women toured the United States and went through several changes before it ultimately reached Broadway nine months later. Its Broadway premiere occurred at the Playhouse Theatre on October 14, 1912; playing for a total of 184 performances. A critical and financial success, Pavey continued to tour nationally in the play after the Broadway run concluded. Some of the theatres she performed the role in during the national tour included the Garrick Theater in Chicago, the Murat Theatre in Indianapolis, the Lyric Theater in Cincinnati, the Adelphi Theatre in Philadelphia, and the Majestic Theatre in Boston. She also appeared later in regional theatre productions of the work in 1917 and 1918.

== Later career ==
After Little Women, Pavey returned to performing in stock and vaudeville. In 1916-1917 she toured in May Robson's theatre company in the comic role of Florence in Maurice Hennequin's The Making Over of Mrs. Matt. In 1919 she performed in the show Creole Fashion Plate in several vaudeville theaters owned by B.F. Keith; including Keith's Theatre in Boston and the B. F. Keith Theatre in Philadelphia.

In the 1920s Pavey performed in several plays in Circuit Chautauquas in the United States. She performed only one more time on Broadway during her career; portraying Miss Cornelia Carlyle in a stage adaptation of Mrs. Henry Wood's novel East Lynne in 1926 in a production that was directed by James Light at the Greenwich Village Theatre. She was still active in regional theatre in the United States as late as 1937. That year she starred in a production of Floyd Dell and Thomas Mitchell's Little Accident.

In 1947 it was reported in the press that there were unsuccessful efforts made to locate Pavey, and that she was missing or possibly dead. A follow up report in November 1948 stated she was most likely dead.
