= Jessie Bonstelle =

American theater manager, director and actress (1871–1932)

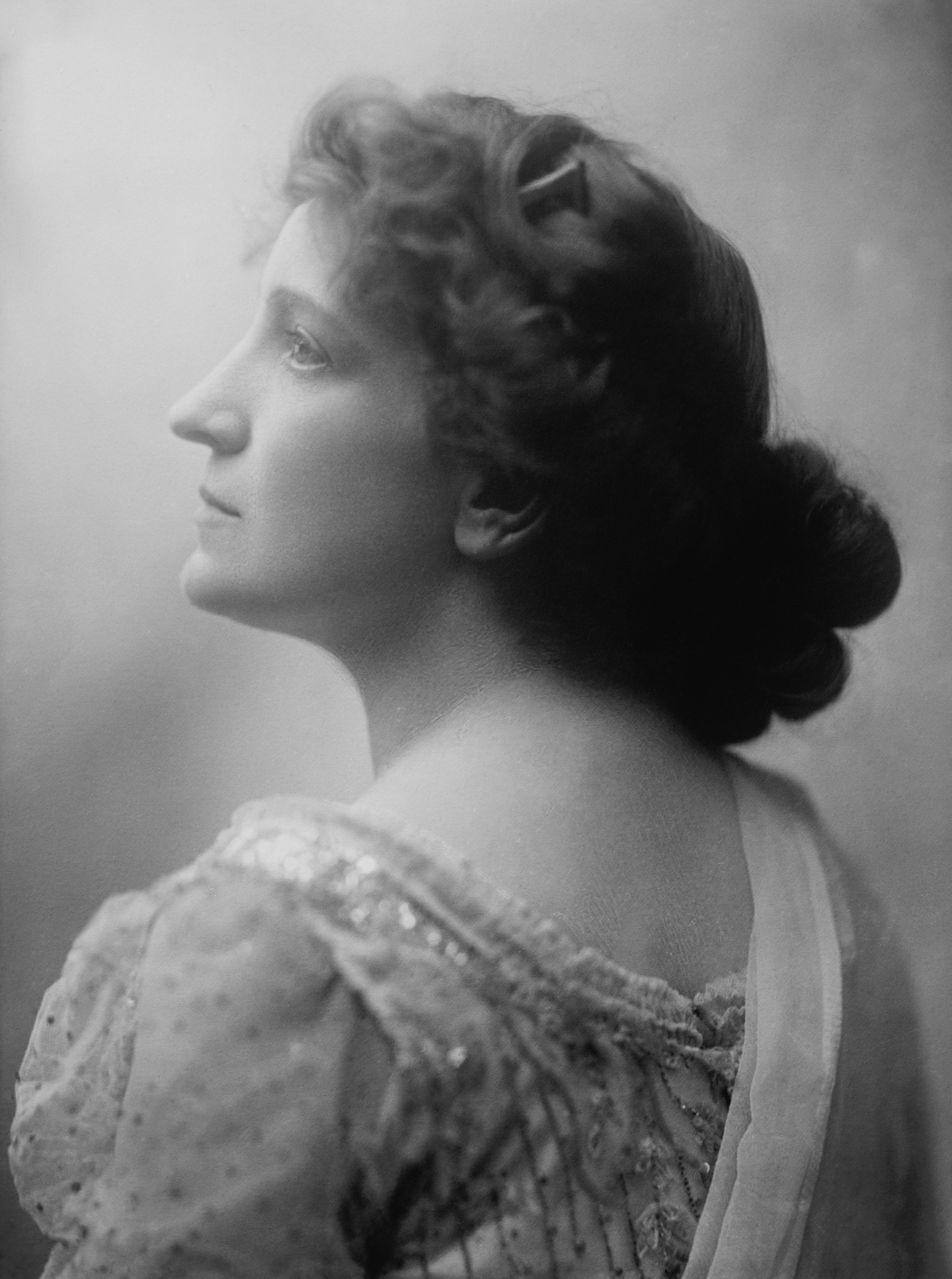
- Born: Laura Justine Bonesteel; November 30, 1871; Greece, New York, U.S.
- Died: October 14, 1932 (aged 60); Detroit, Michigan, U.S.
- Occupations: Theater manager; director; actress
- Known for: Little Women

Jessie Bonstelle (born Laura Justine Bonesteel; November 18, 1871 – October 14, 1932) was an American theater director, actress, and drama company manager. Encouraged by her mother, she sang and performed in the theater from a young age; she went on to become a famous leading lady and made several performances on Broadway. Later she became a director, managing many stock companies, directing Broadway productions and training many young performers who went on to be famous actors. In 1925, she founded her own theater in Detroit. Reorganized in 1928 as the Detroit Civic Theatre, it was one of America's first civic theaters, and her methods influenced community theater projects elsewhere. She has been described as "one of the pioneering women stage directors in the early twentieth century".

== Early life ==
Bonstelle was born to Helen and Joseph Bonesteel on her father's farm near the town of Greece, New York, a suburb of Rochester, New York, the youngest of eight siblings. She was born on November 18, 1871. Originally surnamed Bonesteel, later in life she changed it to Bonstelle after, according to legend, seeing it misspelled like that on a theater marquee.

Bonstelle's mother, who herself had wanted to be an actress, home-schooled her in reading, writing, singing, dancing, and even in reciting Shakespeare. Jessie's first public performance was singing temperance songs in church at the age of two years. Helen gave her daughter a passion for acting by often taking her to theaters in nearby Rochester.

Around the age of ten Jessie auditioned for critic Thomas Keane, and with his encouragement she left on tour with a production of Bertha, the Beautiful Sewing Machine Girl, a melodrama. After returning home from California she briefly studied at Nazareth Academy, a convent school in Rochester. In 1886 she returned to the stage, working for local opera house owner Edward D. Stair and touring in his productions.

== Career ==
After the death of her parents in 1890, Bonstelle went to New York City, and in 1891 she joined the company of Fanny Janauschek, with whom she toured for a season. In 1892 she worked as an understudy and chorus member in Augustin Daly's company, but the season left her exhausted. However, in 1893, she married the actor Alexander Hamilton Stuart: 20 years her senior, and Janauschek's leading man.

Happily married, together they worked in Philadelphia's Forepaugh Stock Company for two years, before moving to Rochester, where Bonstelle played various roles and became an established leading lady. She was the leading lady of Philadelphia's Standard Stock Company during the 1898–99 season. Stuart died in 1911; Bonstelle would never remarry.

Bonstelle performed in three productions on Broadway, including Elizabeth Jordan's The Lady from Oklahoma, which Bonstelle herself produced in 1913. Her acting received mixed or poor reception from New York Times critics, and according to some she "lacked creative depth".

In 1899, while playing with the Biancke Sisters, Bonstelle produced Heimat by Hermann Sudermann. This was its first performance in the United States, and only the second in English. Later she received a letter from Sudermann in which he thanked her for performing his work. Her career as a manager and director began around 1900 when Jacob J. Shubert offered her the management of a stock company in Rochester. This company, the Lyceum stock company, based at Rochester's Lyceum Theater, included some prominent actors and future stars, such as Orrin Johnson, Margaret Wycherly and Charles Hutchison.

She spent the next five years managing, directing and acting there, but also appeared from time to time in Philadelphia and toured at least once in Canada. Moreover, she occasionally directed for the Shuberts in New York, and was associated with Frederick Freeman Proctor's 125th Street Theater in Harlem. Bonstelle said that her dedication was partly inspired by the death of Janauschek in 1904, realizing that what she did for the theater was lasting.

From 1906 she managed stock companies at the Star Theater in Buffalo, and from 1910 also at Detroit's Garrick Theater, moving weekly between the two cities. She usually put on plays which had recently been successful on Broadway, but not those which she saw as immoral. The most popular production she directed was Marian de Forest's Little Women; an adaptation of Louisa May Alcott's novel of the same name. Bonstelle did her own research to inform the creation of the play, traveling to Boston to view personal papers provided by Alcott's family and talking to her friends. The production had its world premiere at the Teck Theatre in Buffalo, New York on January 22, 1912. It then toured nationally before having a "successful and lengthy run" on Broadway which began in October 1912. It was also performed in London after World War I. From 1912 to 1917 she was a director at the Northampton Municipal Theater in Massachusetts.

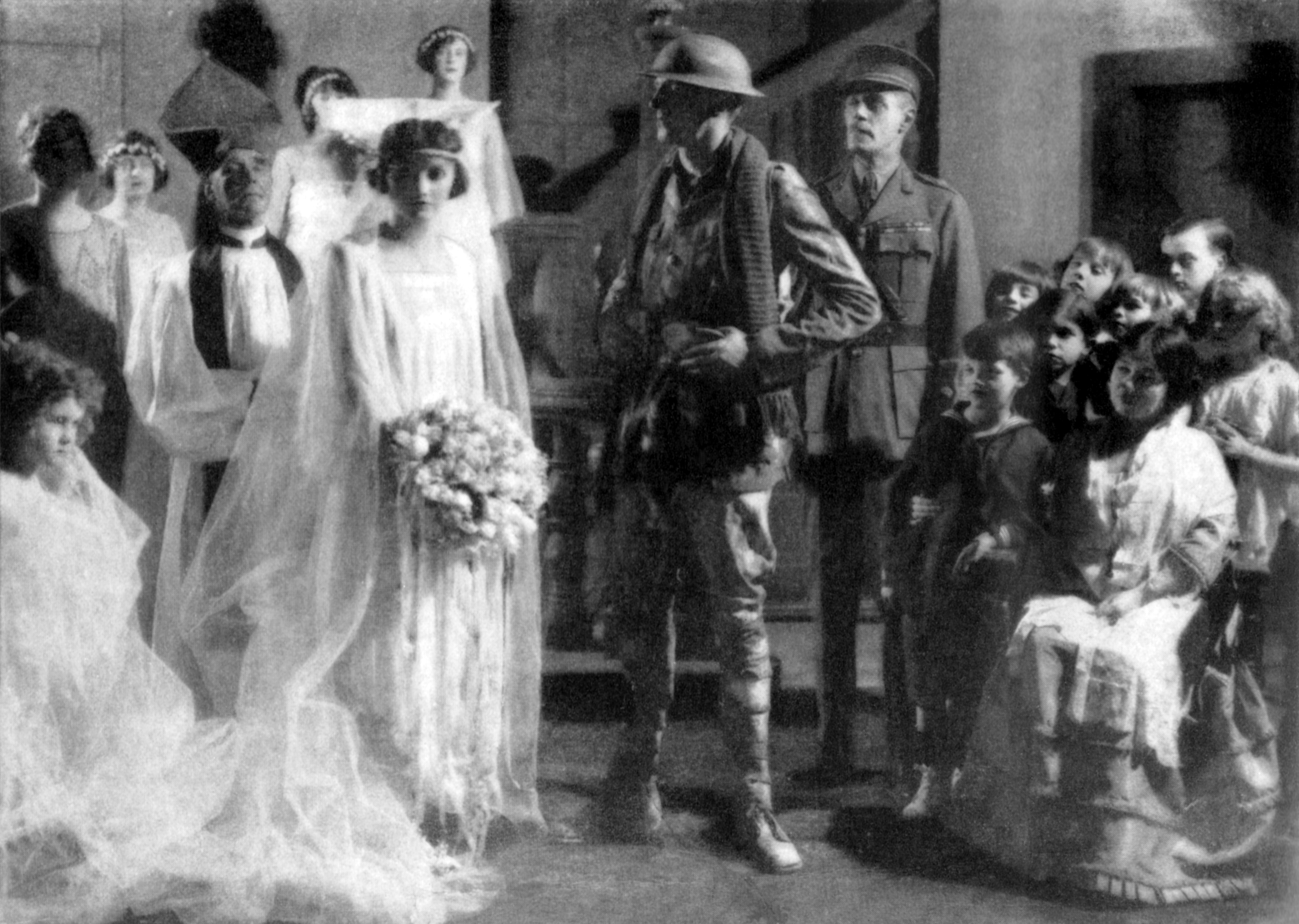
Katharine Cornell starred in the premiere production of The Enchanted Cottage, directed by Bonstelle at Broadway's Ritz Theatre (1923).

Bonstelle sold her stake in the Garrick Theater in 1924. She and her company founded the Bonstelle Playhouse in Detroit, which opened on January 1, 1925. Backed by a syndicate led by a patron of hers, she bought a former synagogue on Woodward Avenue, Temple Beth El, for $500,000 and commissioned C. Howard Crane to renovate it. At first she carried on producing mostly Broadway-style plays. However, the company did perform classics, including modern-dress productions of Romeo and Juliet in 1926 and Hamlet in 1927, among the first to put on such performances.

In February 1928 Bonstelle began a campaign to gain community support for the theater. A fund of over $200,000 was raised by donations from the public and Bonstelle made an agreement with local authorities to make the playhouse the city's unofficial premier theater. Later that year the group became known as the Detroit Civic Theater. In her plan for the theater she emphasized the importance of providing the public with the best drama, including both classics and modern works, and improving young people's knowledge of dramatic literature. Funded by public subscription, it had ticket prices as low as $1.50. Performances included works by Shakespeare, Henrik Ibsen and Richard Brinsley Sheridan. The theater also played a religious role. Bonstelle used it in an effort to improve understanding and co-operation between the church and the theater, holding multi-denominational religious services there during Lent, and she stated that her plays, while avoiding being preachy, were intended to have a positive moral influence on the audience. Local clergy publicly praised her work with the theater.

In June 1932 Bonstelle went to Hollywood; possible reasons include a desire to direct films, to found an acting school, or to explore the possibility of a new stock company. She returned to Detroit after falling ill and learning she had cancer. There she began a campaign to keep open the Civic Theatre, which was adversely affected by the Great Depression, but became seriously ill. Aided by her secretary, she continued to campaign for and run the theater until her death on October 14, 1932, when she suffered a heart attack at the home of relatives in Detroit.

On October 16, her body lay in state at the theater and the New York Times reported that twenty-five thousand people went to see her bier. A memorial service was held there which thousands attended and at which mayor Frank Murphy spoke. She was buried in Rochester at Mount Hope Cemetery next to her husband.

== Character ==
Bonstelle was a perfectionist who was passionate about her work. She ran grueling rehearsals and kept control over the direction, even on productions she was not directing. However, she was willing to help actors if they were struggling, and was respected for her passion and drive.

== Reception and legacy ==
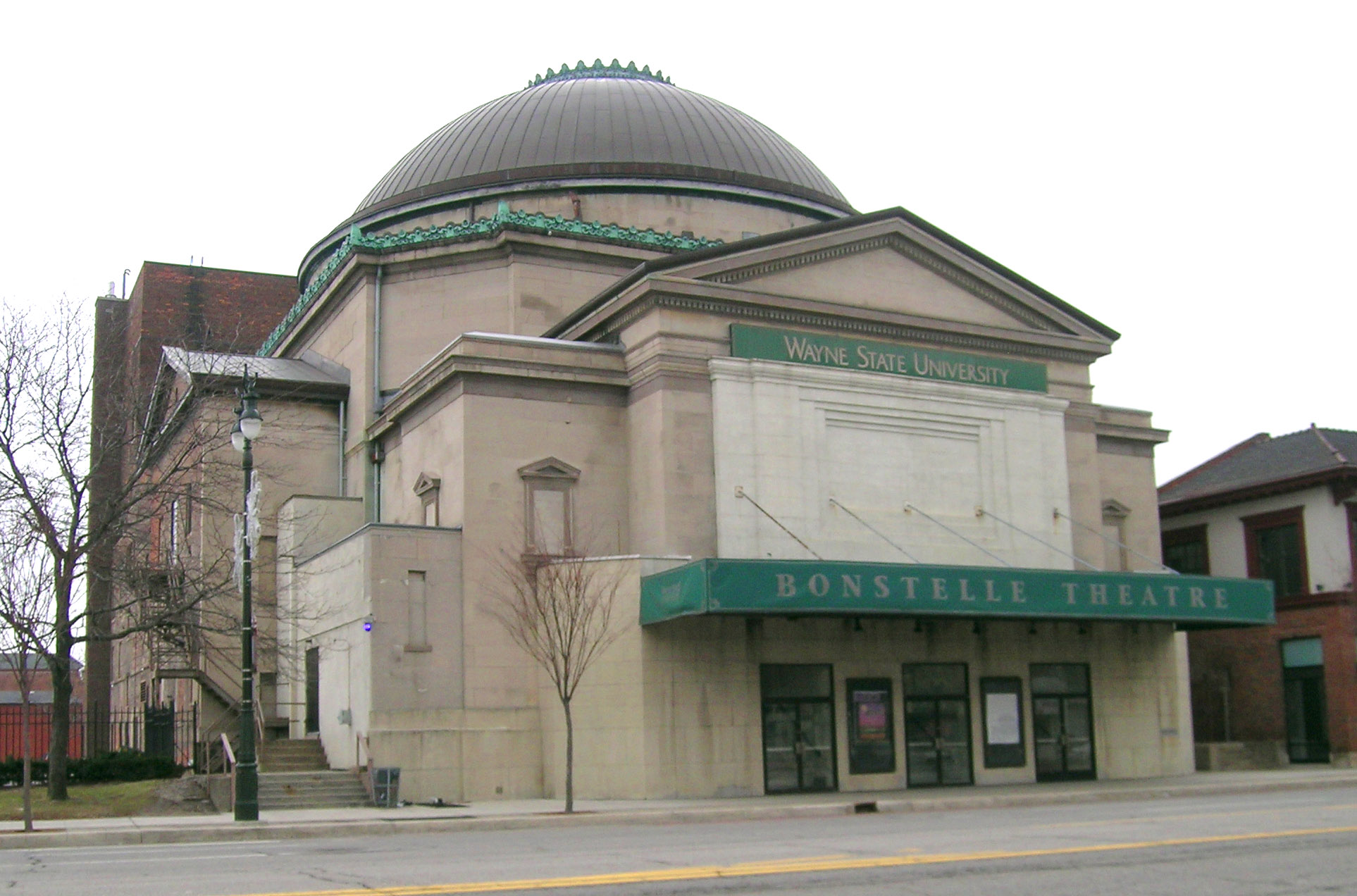
Bonstelle Theatre in 2008

Bonstelle had a wide reputation; according to Brooks Atkinson: her "industry in the theater [was] famous throughout Eastern America". However, Broadway critics did not rate her directing highly. In Detroit, though, drama critics praised her greatly, and few of her 165 plays were poorly reviewed; however most of these critics were in fact either friends of Bonstelle or employees of Stair.

Bonstelle's Playhouse was one of America's first civic theaters, and, uniquely in the 1920s, a profitable one. Though it closed in 1933, a year after her death, due to the rise of the movie industry and the Depression, it was purchased by Wayne State University in 1956 for the use of its theater department. In 1963 it was renamed the Bonstelle Theatre in her memory. Bonstelle's approach gained nationwide attention and she was interviewed by authorities from other cities which wanted information about her plan. Her theater influenced the future Federal Theatre Project.

She was well known for spotting talent in young actors, and was skilled at developing that talent. She trained many actors and actresses who later became well known, including Katharine Cornell and William Powell.
