= Gertrude Berkeley =

American actress (1864 – 1946)

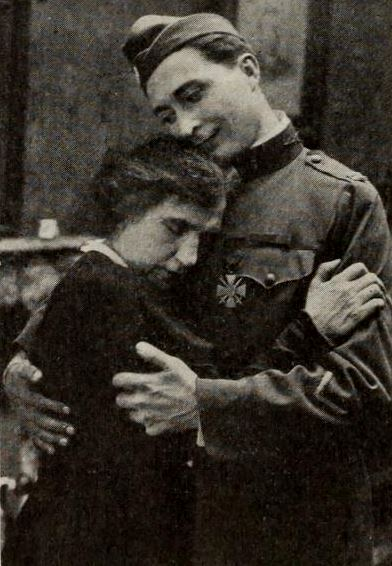
Gertrude Berkeley with actor Raymond Bloomer in the film Break the News to Mother (1919)

Gertrude Berkeley ( 24 June 1864 – 15 June 1946) was an American actress of stage and screen. She began her career performing in repertory theatre in the 1880s, and performed widely in touring road companies and stock theatre during the latter half of the 19th century into the early twentieth century. She appeared with some regularity on Broadway from 1906 through 1917; performing in plays by Louis K. Anspacher, J. M. Barrie, Rachel Crothers, and Henrik Ibsen. As a stage actress she is best remembered for creating the role of Mrs. March in the original Broadway and national touring productions of Marian de Forest's Little Women; a play adapted from the novel by Louisa May Alcott. She made several silent films with the Fox Film Corporation from 1915 to 1921; often portraying motherly figures or comic older women. She was the mother of film director and musical choreographer Busby Berkeley.

== Life and career ==
Born Nellie Gertrude Berkeley on June 24, 1864, in Plattsburgh, New York, Berkeley was the eighth of twelve children born to Arthur Tisdale Berkeley and Mary Jane Berkeley (née Hooey). She was educated at the Potsdam Normal School (now the State University of New York at Potsdam) where she developed her talents as an actress.

Berkeley made her professional stage debut at the age of 17 in Potsdam, New York, portraying a much older woman, Mrs. Cregan, in Dion Boucicault's The Colleen Bawn. She performed widely in repertory theatre with regional companies in the United States in the 1880s, and by 1890 she had become a member of Tim Frawly's Stock Company in San Francisco. There she met the actor and director Francis Enos (better known by his stage name Wilson Enos) and his son George, who had been born from Enos' previous marriage to the actress Ida Lewis -- a marriage which had ended in divorce. Gertrude and Francis became a couple soon after, and they wed on June 17, 1891. Four years later, the couple gave birth to a son, the film director and musical choreographer Busby Berkeley, on November 29, 1895.

In 1906 Berkely made her Broadway debut at Wallack's Theatre as Mrs. Goodwin in Louis K. Anspacher's The Embarrassment of Riches, a play headlined by actors Charlotte Walker and Bruce McRae. She appeared in several more plays on Broadway over the next decade in such roles as Aline Solness in Henrik Ibsen's The Master Builder (1907), Christine Marshall in Rachel Crothers's Myself -- Bettina (1908), and The Rat-Wife in Ibsen's Little Eyolf (1910), among others. She is best remembered for creating the role of Mrs. March in the original production of Marian de Forest's Little Women in 1912 -- a role she performed both on Broadway and the national tour. Her final appearance on Broadway was in the original production of J. M. Barrie's Old Friends in 1917.

Berkeley starred in several silent films by the Fox Film Corporation from 1915 to 1921, often appearing as motherly figures or comic older women. These included The Soul of Broadway (1915, as Stage Actress), The Two Orphans (1915, as Mother Frochard), War Brides (1916, as The Mother), Over There (1917), The Iron Heart (1917, as Mrs. Martin), The Song of Songs (1918, as Mrs. Kardos), The Way of a Woman (1919, as Mrs. Lee), and Suspicious Wives (1921, as the Old Woman).

Gertrude Berkeley died on June 15, 1946, at the age of 81 in Los Angeles, California.
