= Clarette Clare =

American silent film actress

Clarette Clare was a silent film actress. She played Janet Ferguson in The Black Circle (1919) by Frank Reicher, and Gretchen in Rip Van Winkle (1914) alongside Thomas and Daisy Jefferson, between others.

== Filmography ==
- The Black Circle (1919) as Janet Ferguson
- Madelaine Morel (1916) as Countess Dalberg
- The Vulture (1915) as Lady Edith Merton
- His Hand and Seal (1915)
- The Country Parson (1915)
- The Seymour House Party (1915) as Mrs. Seymour
- The Soul of Pierre (1915)
- The Wheel of the Gods (1915)
- Mrs. Randolph's New Secretary (1915) Mrs. Randolph's Secretary
- The Lady of Dreams (1915) as Mrs. Van Stuyvesant
- The Deacon's Son (1914) as George's Mother
- The Romance of a Poor Young Man (1914) as Laroque's Daughter
- Rip Van Winkle (1914) Gretchen Van Winkle
- Butterflies and Orange Blossoms (1914) as The Bachelor's Mother
- Gwendolin (1914) as Mrs. Deronda - Daniel's Mother (as Clairette Claire)
- Who's Looney Now? (1914) as Mrs. Guggenheimer
