= Over There (film) =

1917 war drama film

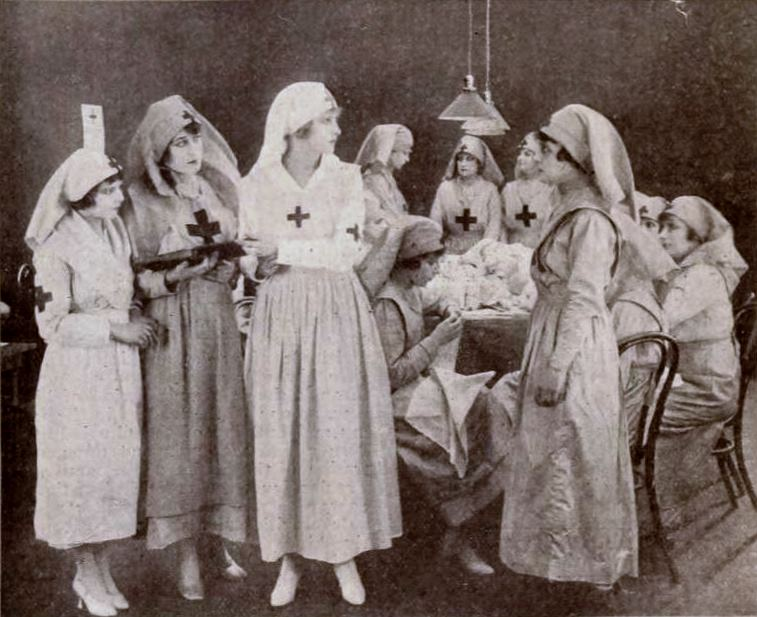
- Directed by: James Kirkwood
- Written by: Charles Richman; Eve Unsell
- Starring: Charles Richman; Anna Q. Nilsson; Walter McGrail
- Production company: Charles Richman Pictures
- Distributed by: Select Pictures
- Release date: October 27, 1917
- Running time: 60 minutes
- Country: United States
- Languages: Silent; English intertitles

Over There is a 1917 American silent war drama film directed by James Kirkwood and starring Charles Richman, Anna Q. Nilsson and Walter McGrail. It was made as a pro-war portrayal of the American Expeditionary Force in World War I and took its name from the popular song Over There.

== Cast ==
- Charles Richman as Montgomery Jackson
- Anna Q. Nilsson as Bettie Adams
- Walter McGrail
- Gertrude Berkeley
- Walter Hiers
- Veta Searl
- James A. Furey

== Bibliography ==
- Diane M. T. North. The State and the People: California During the First World War. University of California, Davis, 2001.
