= The Way of a Woman =

1919 American silent drama film directed by Robert Z. Leonard

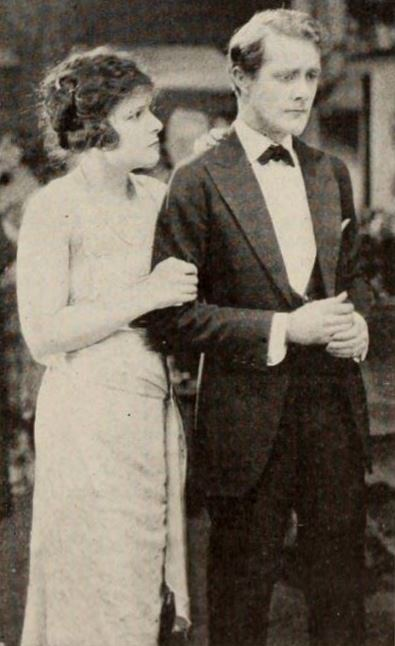
- Norma Talmadge and George LeGuere
- Directed by: Robert Z. Leonard
- Written by: Eugene Walter
- Based on: a play Nancy Lee by Eugene Walter and H. Crownin Wilson
- Produced by: Norma Talmadge
- Starring: Norma Talmadge; Conway Tearle
- Cinematography: David Abel
- Distributed by: Select Pictures
- Release date: July 27, 1919
- Running time: 5 reels
- Country: USA
- Language: Silent..English titles

The Way of a Woman is a 1919 silent film drama directed by Robert Z. Leonard and starring Norma Talmadge. Talmadge produced and the film was distributed by Select Pictures.

== Cast ==
- Norma Talmadge - Nancy Lee
- Conway Tearle - Anthony Weir
- Gertrude Berkeley - Mrs. Lee
- Frank DeVernon - Mr. Lee (*Colonel Vernon)
- May McAvoy - Grace Lee
- Jobyna Howland - Mollie Wise
- Hassard Short - Johnnie Flinch
- George Le Guere - Douglas Weir
- Stuart Holmes - George Trevor
- William Humphrey - Nathan Caspar (*aka William J. Humphrey)

== Preservation status ==
A print is held at BFI National Film and Television Archive.
