= The Black Circle (film) =

1919 film by Frank Reicher

The Black Circle is a 1919 silent film directed by Frank Reicher. Released by the World Film Company, the story was written by Raymond C. Hill and Giles Warren. It starred Creighton Hale, Virginia Valli, Jack Drumier, Eva Gordon, and Carl Sauerman. The film was about a gang of criminals operating in rural America.

== Cast ==
- Creighton Hale as Andrew MacTavish Ferguson
- Virginia Valli as Lucy Baird
- Jack Drumier as Daniel Baird
- Walter Horton as Phillip Parker
- Clarette Clare as Janet Ferguson
- Edwin Denison as Al Garvin
- John Davidson as Jim Garvin
- Carl Sauerman as Jacob Ackerman
- Eva Gordon as Eve Parker
- Adolph Millar as Jeff Pollard
