= Rip Van Winkle (1914 film) =

1914 American film

- Ray Van Winkle (1914)
- Directed by: Edwin Middleton
- Based on: "Rip Van Winkle"
- Starring: Thomas Jefferson
- Cinematography: Sol Polito
- Release date: 1914
- Running time: 58 minutes
- Country: United States

Rip Van Winkle is a 1914 American silent drama and fantasy film, starring Thomas Jefferson. An adaptation of "Rip Van Winkle" by Washington Irving, it was produced by Rolfe Photoplays. With a runtime of 58 minutes, it was directed by Edwin Middleton, and cinematography was done by Sol Polito.

== Cast ==
- Clarette Clare
- Daisy Jefferson
- G. Sabi
- Harry Blakemore
- Loel Steuart
- Maurice Steuart
- Thomas Jefferson
- Wallace Scott
- William Cavanaugh
- William Chamberlain
