= Little Women (play) =

Play by Marian de Forest based on the book by Louisa May Alcott

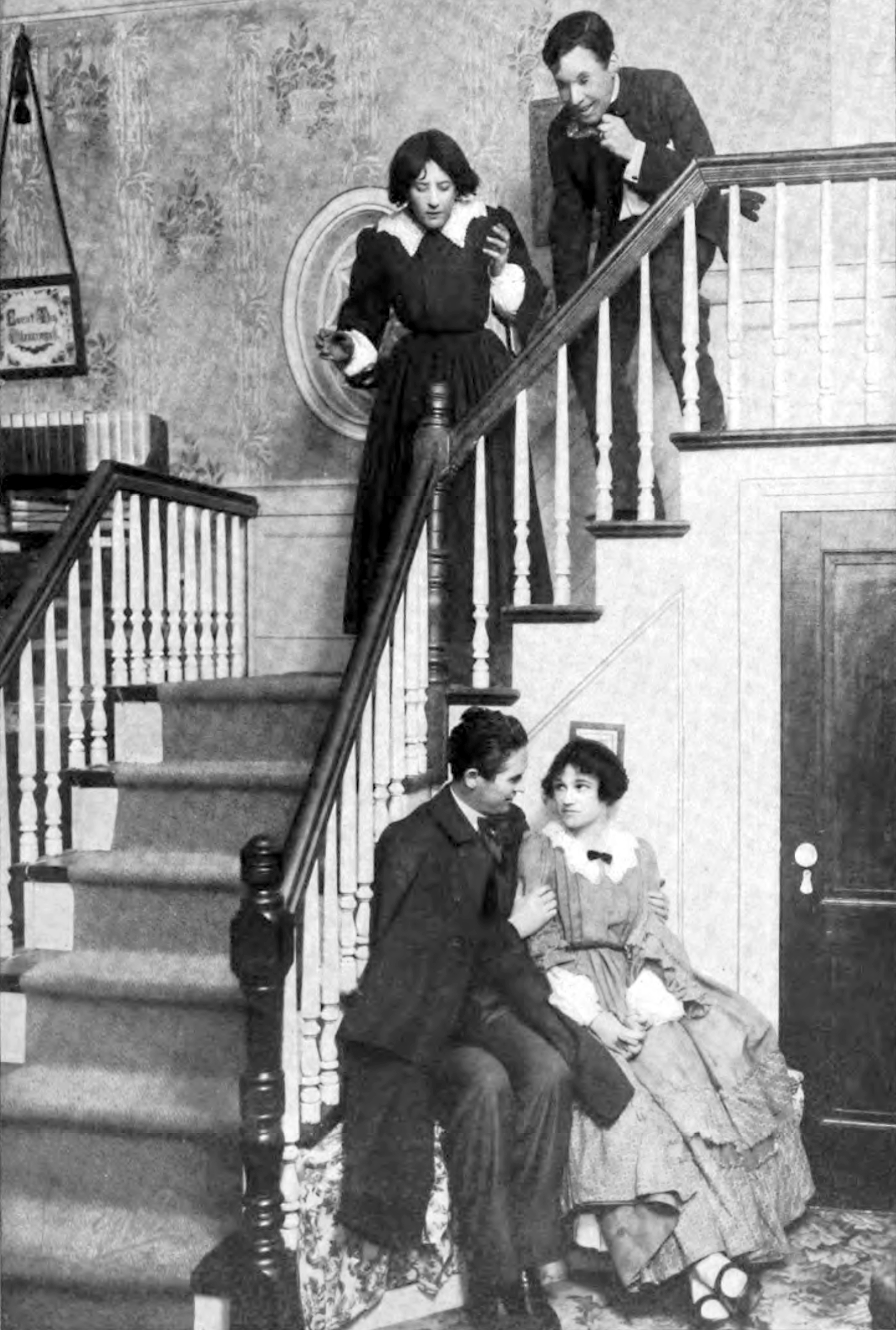
Photograph of a scene from the 1912 Broadway production of Little Women. Subjects at top of stairs: Marie Pavey (Jo), Donald McLaren (Laurie) Subjects seated: John Cromwell (John Brooke), Alice Brady (Meg)

Little Women is a play in four acts by Marian de Forest which was adapted from the novel of the same name by Louisa May Alcott. The only full-length stage adaptation of the work authorized by the Alcott family, the work was first staged on Broadway at the Playhouse Theatre in 1912. It was subsequently revived on Broadway in 1917, 1931, 1944, and 1946. The play was frequently performed in regional theatre in the United States during the early to mid 20th century.

== History ==
Jessie Bonstelle, one of the first women to work as a director in the United States, was interested in adapting Louisa May Alcott's Little Women for the Broadway stage. She unsuccessfully appealed to the Alcott family for the rights to adapt the work for a period of eight years. She finally obtained permission from the family after the death of one of Alcott's nephews who was one of the joint heirs to Alcott's published literary works. This permission was contingent on the Alcott family's approval of the script. Concerned that her own skills as a writer were insufficient to adapt the novel adequately, Bonstelle enlisted playwright Marian de Forest to adapt the work for her.

Little Women premiered at the Teck Theatre in Buffalo, New York on January 22, 1912, in a production directed by Bonstelle and produced by William A. Brady. The original cast included Marie Pavey as Jo, Alice Brady as Meg, Gladys Hulette as Beth, Edith Spears as Amy, Gertrude Berkeley as Mrs. March, Eugene A. Eberle as Aunt March, Howard Estabrook as Laurie, John Cromwell as John Brooke, Carl Sauerman as Professor Frederich Bhaer, Carson Davenport as Mr. Lawrence, Lynn Hammond as Mr. March, and Lillian Dix as Hannah Mullett. The production toured the United States and went through a number of revisions before it ultimately reached Broadway nine months later. Its Broadway premiere occurred at the Playhouse Theatre on October 14, 1912, with the only cast change from the Buffalo premiere being the role of Amy which was performed by the actress Beverly West. It ran at the Playhouse Theatre for a total of 184 performances. The play was revived on Broadway in 1917, 1931, 1944, and 1946.

The 1919 London production of the play made a star of Katharine Cornell, who played the role of Jo.
