= Adolph Milar =

American actor

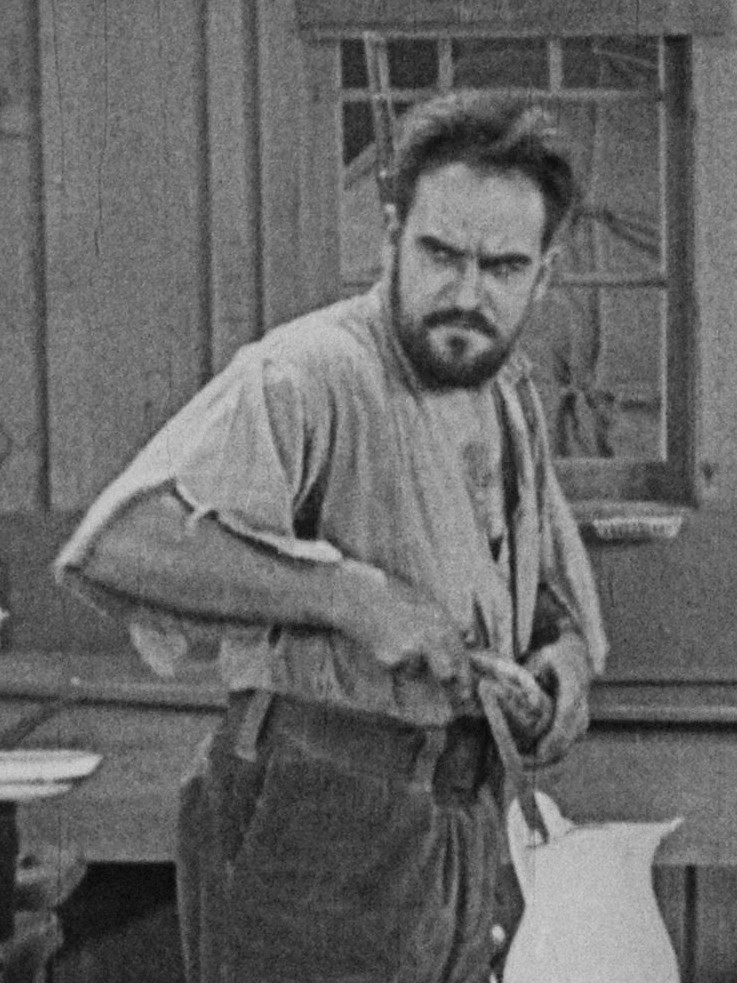
- Adolph Milar in Wandering Papas (1926)
- Born: April 11, 1895; Davos, Switzerland
- Died: May 25, 1950 (aged 55); Santa Clara, California, U.S.
- Occupation: Actor
- Years active: 1919–1945

Adolph Milar (1895–1950) was an American film actor. He appeared in character roles in around sixty American films from 1919 to 1945, playing characters of a variety of nationalities. His name is sometimes written as Adolf Milar.

== Selected filmography ==
- The Black Circle (1919)
- Something Different (1920)
- The Road of Ambition (1920)
- The Silent Barrier (1920)
- The Girl from Porcupine (1921)
- My Friend the Devil (1922)
- Enemies of Women (1923)
- Fury (1923)
- Backbone (1923)
- Love's Wilderness (1924)
- Marriage in Transit (1925)
- Back to God's Country (1927)
- Uncle Tom's Cabin (1927)
- Clothes Make the Woman (1928)
- The Michigan Kid (1928)
- The Devil's Skipper (1928)
- The Gateway of the Moon (1928)
- Bulldog Drummond (1929)
- Call of the Flesh (1930)
- Isle of Escape (1930)
- The Medicine Man (1930)
- Rain or Shine (1930)
- Honeymoon Lane (1931)
- Platinum Blonde (1931)
- The Savage Girl (1932)
- Sons of Steel (1934)
- The Great Impersonation (1935)
- Revolt of the Zombies (1936)
- So Ends Our Night (1941)
- Paris Calling (1941)

== Bibliography ==
- Biskupski, M.B.B. Hollywood's War with Poland, 1939-1945. University Press of Kentucky, 2011.
- Pitts, Michael R. Poverty Row Studios, 1929–1940: An Illustrated History of 55 Independent Film Companies, with a Filmography for Each. McFarland & Company, 2005.
