= My Wife (1918 film) =

1918 film by Dell Henderson

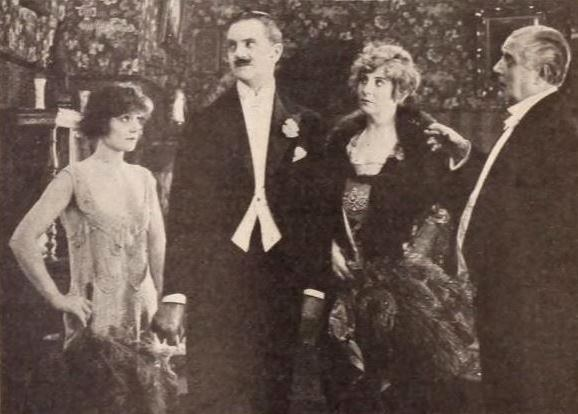
Still from My Wife

My Wife is a 1918 American silent comedy drama film. It is based on Michael Morton's 1907 play of the same name. The film was directed by Dell Henderson. It was made by the Empire All-Star Corporation and distributed by Mutual Film. The film premiered February 18, 1918.

== Plot ==
Beatrice Hammond has inherited a million dollars from her aunt, but can only collect the funds if she marries prior to her eighteenth birthday. Unable to marry her boyfriend, Ronald Farwell, who is away fighting in a war; she instead marries her guardian, Gerald Eversleigh, with the understanding that they will divorce upon Ronald's return. Gerald falls in love with Beatrice and does not want to give up their marriage when Ronald comes home.

== Cast ==
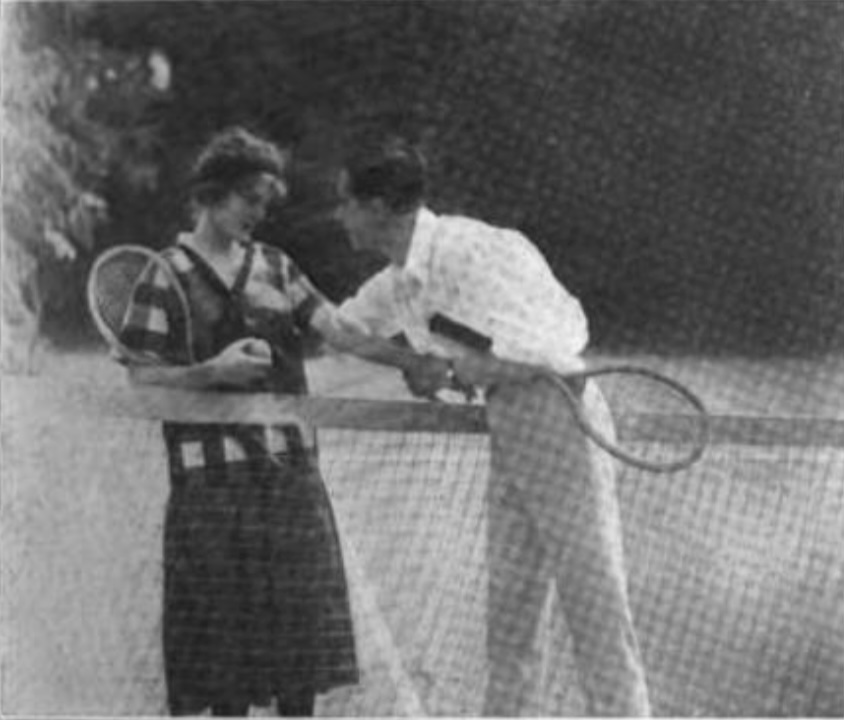
Ann Murdock and Jules Raucourt in My Wife

- Anna Murdock as Beatrice Hammond
- Rex McDougall as Gerald Eversleigh
- Hubert Druce as John Hammond
- Amy Veness as Mrs. Hammond
- Ferdinand Gottschalk as Biggy Gore
- Grace Carlyle as Miriam Hawthorne
- Jules Raucourt as Ronald Farwell
- James Kearney as Davies
- Carl Sauerman as Baron
- Harriet Thompson as Baroness
- Romaine Callender as Valstock
- Dudley Hill as Poltroff
