= Marriage in Transit =

1925 film

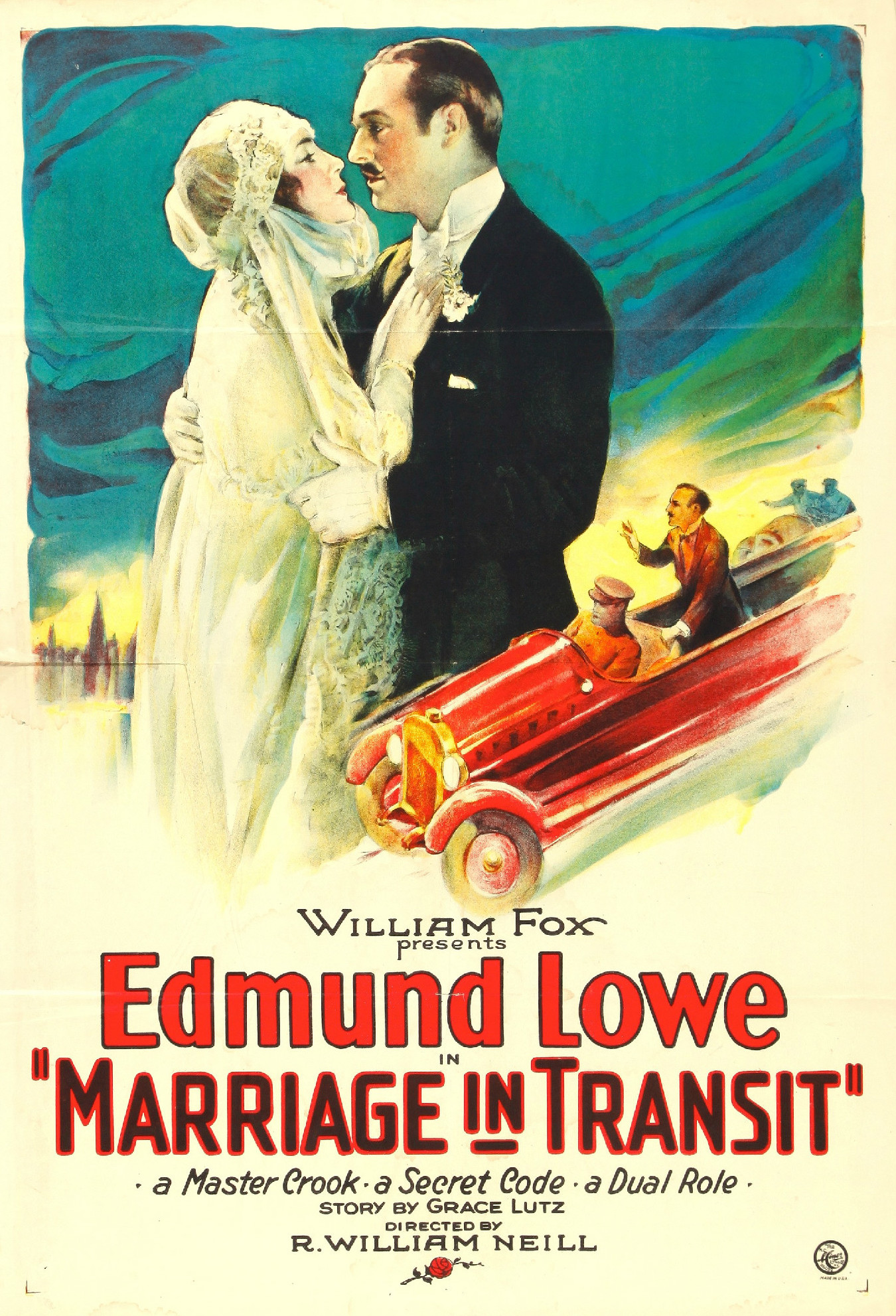
- lobby poster
- Directed by: Roy William Neill
- Written by: Dorothy Yost
- Story by: Grace Lutz
- Produced by: William Fox
- Starring: Edmund Lowe
- Cinematography: G. O. Post
- Distributed by: Fox Film Corporation
- Release date: March 29, 1925
- Running time: 6 reels
- Country: United States
- Language: Silent (English intertitles)

Marriage in Transit is a 1925 American silent comedy film directed by Roy William Neill. It stars Edmund Lowe and Carole Lombard.

== Plot ==
As described in a film magazine review, a Secret Service agent is assigned to recover a government code and capture the bandits that stole it. Because he resembles the ringleader of the bandits, he poses as him, recovers the code, marries the fiancée of the ringleader, and escapes. The young woman remains ignorant until later that she has married a Secret Service agent instead of a crook.

== Cast ==
- Edmund Lowe as Holden, Cyril Gordon
- Carole Lombard as Celia Hathaway
- Adolph Milar as Haynes
- Frank Beal as Burnham
- Fred Walton as Valet
- Byron Douglas as Conspirator
- Fred J. Butler as Conspirator
- Wade Boteler as Conspirator
- Fred Becker as Conspirator
- Eddy Chandler as Conspirator
- Harvey Clark as Aide

== Preservation ==
With no prints of Marriage in Transit located in any film archives, it is a lost film.
