= Lynn Messina =

American author

- Born: Lynn Messina; 1972 (age 53–54); Long Island, United States
- Occupation: Author
- Writing career
- Period: 2003-present
- Genres: Regency Mystery, Romance, Young Adult, Children’s Literature
- Website: www.lynnmessina.com

Lynn Messina is an American author of more than two dozen books including her cozy mystery series set in England during the Regency era featuring sleuth Beatrice Hyde-Clare.

== Biography ==
Messina grew up on Long Island, New York. Her first job was a papergirl delivering Newsday newspapers after school. She co-edited her high school yearbook and newspaper.

At Washington University in St. Louis, she studied English Literature and Women Studies, spending her junior year studying at King's College London. After graduating she moved to Manhattan and worked as an editorial assistant at Avalon Books and the Museum of Television and Radio (now the Paley Center for Media).

She became a freelance copyeditor for magazines to focus on writing books. Red Dress Ink published her first novel Fashionistas, about scheming editors at a fashion magazine which became a bestseller, translated into 15 languages, and briefly optioned by producer Christine Peters as a vehicle for Lindsay Lohan. When Fashionistas was mentioned in Women’s Wear Daily, Messina lost her regular gig at InStyle.

She published four more novels with legacy publishers including Harcourt and HarperCollins before finding success as an independent author with Prejudice & Pride and her Beatrice Hyde-Clare cozies set in Regency-era England and the Verity Lark spin-off mysteries. A Brazen Curiosity, the first Beatrice Hyde-Clare mystery, has also been published in translation by Harashobo (Japanese), Les Escales (French), Knihy Dobrovský (Czech), Aula & Co. (Finnish), Thiele Verlag (German), Pioneer (Hungarian), and Znak (Polish).

Other books she has published under the Potatoworks imprint include Girls’ Guide to Dating Zombies and the Love Takes Root series.

Her influences include Elizabeth Peters, Dorothy L. Sayers, Georgette Heyer, Baroness Orczy, Douglas Coupland, and Tom Stoppard.

== Books ==
=== Beatrice Hyde-Clare Mystery ===
- A Wretched Folly (A Beatrice Hyde-Clare Mystery, #14) (2026)
- A Pernicious Fabrication (A Beatrice Hyde-Clare Mystery, #13) (2025)
- A Vicious Machination (A Beatrice Hyde-Clare Mystery, #12) (2024)
- A Murderous Tryst (A Beatrice Hyde-Clare Mystery, #11) (2023)
- An Extravagant Duplicity (A Beatrice Hyde-Clare Mystery, #10) (2023)
- An Ominous Explosion (A Beatrice Hyde-Clare Mystery, #9) (2022)
- A Malevolent Connection (A Beatrice Hyde-Clare Mystery, #8) (2021)
- A Ghastly Spectacle (A Beatrice Hyde-Clare Mystery, #7) (2021)
- A Sinister Establishment (A Beatrice Hyde-Clare Mystery, #6) (2020)
- A Treacherous Performance (A Beatrice Hyde-Clare Mystery, #5) (2019)
- A Nefarious Engagement (A Beatrice Hyde-Clare Mystery, #4) (2019)
- An Infamous Betrayal (A Beatrice Hyde-Clare Mysteries, #3) (2018)
- A Scandalous Deception (A Beatrice Hyde-Clare Mystery, #2) (2018)
- A Brazen Curiosity (A Beatrice Hyde-Clare Mystery, #1) (2018)

=== Flora Hyde-Clare Mystery ===
- A Highly Courageous Adventure (A Flora Hyde-Clare Mystery, #2) (2025)
- A Boldly Daring Scheme (A Flora Hyde-Clare Mystery, #1) (2020)

=== Verity Lark Mystery ===
- A Lark's Regret (A Verity Lark Mystery, #5) (2025)
- A Lark's Release (A Verity Lark Mystery, #4) (2024)
- A Lark's Conceit (A Verity Lark Mystery, #3) (2024)
- A Lark's Flight (A Verity Lark Mystery, #2) (2023)
- A Lark's Tale (A Verity Lark Mystery, #1) (2022)

=== Love Takes Root ===
- The Impertinent Miss Templeton (Love Takes Root, #5) (2018)
- The Bolingbrook Chit (Love Takes Root, #4) (2015)
- The Fellingham Minx (Love Takes Root, #3) (2014)
- Miss Fellingham's Rebellion (Love Takes Root, #2.5) (2014)
- The Other Harlow Girl (Love Takes Root, #2) (2014)
- The Harlow Hoyden (Love Takes Root, #1) (2014)

=== Other novels ===
- Violet Venom's Rules for Life (2018)
- Prejudice & Pride (2015)
- Winner Takes All (2015)
- Henry and the Incredibly Incorrigible, Inconveniently Intelligent Smart Human (2012)
- Bleak (2012)
- The Girls' Guide to Dating Zombies (2012)
- Little Vampire Women (2010)
- Savvy Girl (2008)
- Mim Warner's Lost Her Cool (2005)
- Never on a Sundae (2004)
- Tallulahland (2004)
- Fashionistas (2003)
