= Little Women =

1868–69 novel by Louisa May Alcott

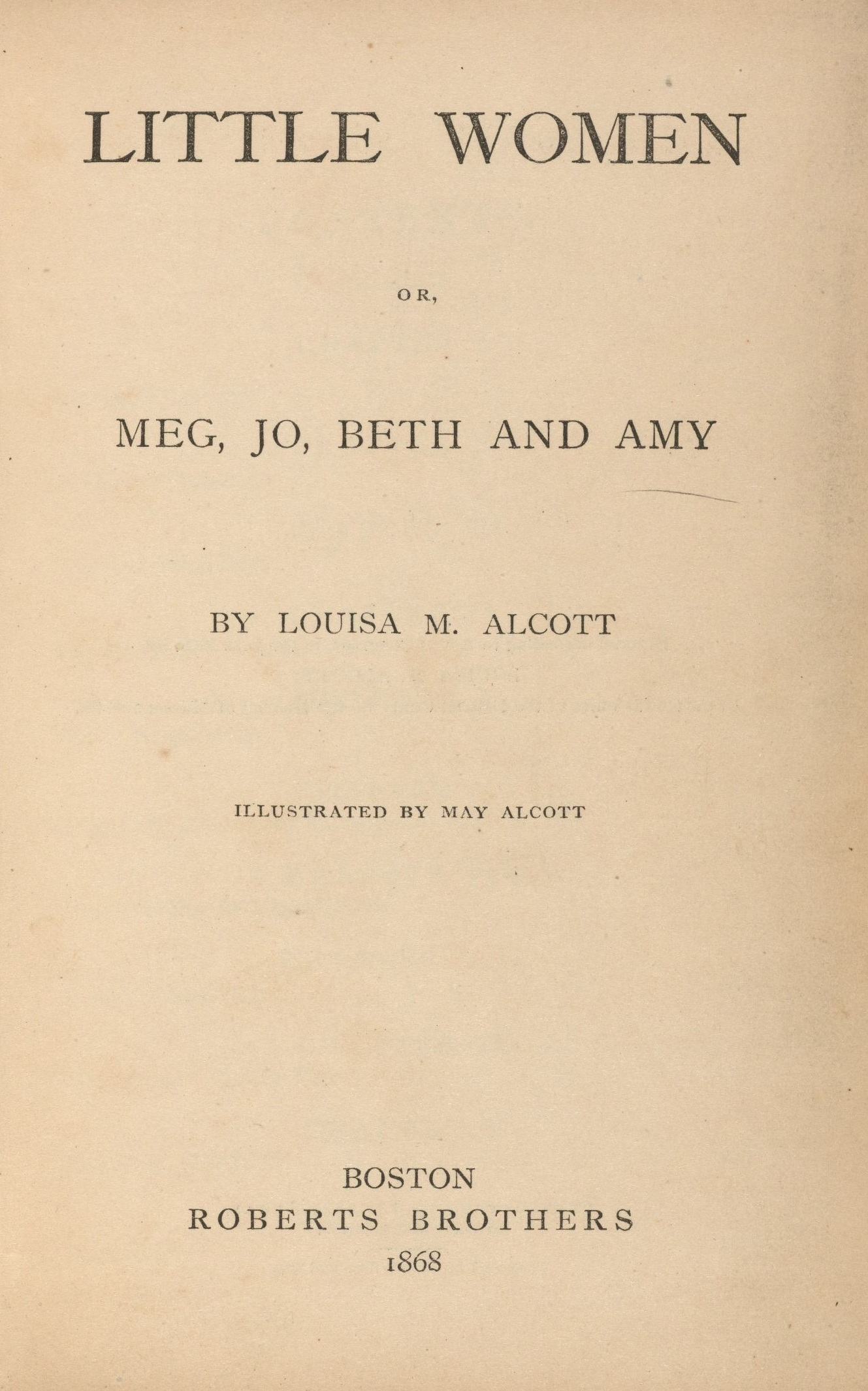
- First volume of Little Women (1868)
- Author: Louisa May Alcott
- Original title: Little Women or, Meg, Jo, Beth and Amy
- Working title: Meg, Jo, Beth and Amy
- Illustrator: Abigail May Alcott Nieriker
- Language: English
- Series: Little Women
- Release number: 1st in series
- Genre: Coming-of-age (Bildungsroman); Historical fiction Romance; Children's literature
- Set in: Massachusetts; New York City; Europe
- Publisher: Roberts Brothers
- Publication date: September 30, 1868 (1st volume); April 1869 (2nd volume)
- Publication place: United States
- Media type: Print
- Pages: 335 + 355
- Dewey Decimal: 813.4
- LC Class: PZ7.A335
- Followed by: Little Men
- Text: Little Women at Wikisource

Little Women is a coming-of-age novel written by American novelist Louisa May Alcott, originally published in two volumes, in 1868 and 1869. The story follows the lives of the four March sisters—Meg, Jo, Beth, and Amy—and details their passage from childhood to womanhood. Loosely based on the lives of the author and her three sisters, it is classified as an autobiographical or semi-autobiographical novel.

Little Women was an immediate commercial and critical success, and readers were eager for more of the characters. Alcott quickly completed a second volume (titled Good Wives or Little Women Married in the United Kingdom, though the name originated with the publisher and not Alcott). It was also met with success. The two volumes were issued in 1880 as a single novel titled Little Women. Alcott subsequently wrote two sequels to her popular work, both also featuring the March sisters: Little Men (1871) and Jo's Boys (1886).

The novel has been said to address three major themes: "domesticity, work, and true love, all of them interdependent and each necessary to the achievement of its heroine's individual identity." According to Sarah Elbert, Alcott created a new form of literature, one that took elements from romantic children's fiction and combined it with others from sentimental novels, resulting in a totally new genre. Elbert argues that within Little Women can be found the first vision of the "All-American girl" and that her various aspects are embodied in the differing March sisters.

The book has been translated into numerous languages and frequently adapted for stage and screen.

== Background ==
In 1868, Alcott's publisher, Thomas Niles, recommended that she write a novel about girls that would have widespread appeal. Alcott resisted, preferring to publish a collection of short stories, instead. Niles pressed her to write the girls' book first, however, and he was aided by her father, Amos Bronson Alcott, who also urged her to do so. Louisa confided to a friend, "I could not write a girls' story knowing little about any but my sisters and always preferring boys".

In May 1868, Alcott wrote in her journal: "Niles, partner of Roberts, asked me to write a girl's book. I said I'd try." Alcott set her novel in an imaginary Orchard House modeled on her residence of the same name, where she wrote the novel. She later recalled that she did not think she could write a successful book for girls and did not enjoy writing it. "I plod away," she wrote in her diary, "although, I don't enjoy this sort of things."

By June, Alcott had sent the first dozen chapters to Niles, and both agreed that they were dull. But Niles's niece, Lillie Almy, read them and said she enjoyed them. The completed manuscript was shown to several girls who agreed it was "splendid". Alcott wrote: "they are the best critics, so, I should definitely be satisfied." She wrote Little Women "in record time for money", but the book's immediate success surprised both her and her publisher.

Little Women was a novel that took part in the realism literary movement of the mid-to-late 1800s. This movement focused on naturally depicting everyday life and is seen through Alcott’s portrayal of the real aspects of women’s lives through the ways the characters interact with one another, work, and play. Gregory Eiselein and Anne Phillips write: "Fresh, lively, and distinctly American, the novel offered singular depictions of young women and men playing, talking, squabbling, dreaming, creating, learning, and coming of age in ways that embodied and resisted its era and region and immediately generated passionate responses." Readers are able to see and experience the joys and sorrows of the March family and come to understand what it meant to be a woman in the nineteenth century.

One real aspect that Alcott focused on was marriage. Marriage was exceedingly prevalent in the lives of women in the nineteenth century; during that time 93% of women in America married. However, what was special about the marriages the March women made was their equal partnerships within their relationships. Daniel Shealy writes: "Alcott gave serious thought to the marriages in part two and set out to instruct her readers, especially young women, on the importance of egalitarian relationships between husbands and wives." The equal unions between man and wife can be seen through each relationship the March women have, especially between Mr. and Mrs. March and Meg and John Brooke, as they both share equal footing in the household and in the decisions regarding their children.

=== Title ===
According to literary critic Sarah Elbert, Alcott used the phrase "little women" to draw on its Dickensian meaning; it represented the period in a young woman's life where childhood and elder childhood are "overlapping" with young womanhood. Each of the March sister heroines has a harrowing experience that alerts them and the reader that "childhood innocence" is of the past, and that "the inescapable woman problem" is all that remains.

== Plot ==
Meg, Jo, Beth, and Amy, and their mother, whom they call Marmee, live in a new neighborhood (loosely based on Concord) in Massachusetts in genteel poverty. Having lost all his money, their father is serving as a chaplain for the Union Army in the American Civil War, far from home. The mother and daughters face their first Christmas without him. When Marmee asks them to give their Christmas breakfast away to an impoverished family, the girls and their mother venture to the Hummels' home, laden with baskets, to feed the hungry children, help patch broken window panes, and give them firewood. Later that evening their wealthy neighbor, elderly Mr. Laurence, sends over a decadent surprise dinner to make up for their donated breakfast. The two families become acquainted following these acts of kindness.

Meg and Jo must work to support the family: Meg tutors a nearby family of four children; Jo assists her aged great-aunt March, a wealthy widow living in a mansion in Plumfield. Beth, too timid for school, is content to stay at home and help with housework, and Amy is still at school. Meg is beautiful and traditional, Jo is a tomboy who writes, Beth is a peacemaker and a pianist, and Amy is an artist who longs for elegance and fine society. The sisters strive to help their family and improve their characters, as Meg is vain, Jo is hotheaded, Beth is cripplingly shy, and Amy is materialistic. Laurie, Mr. Laurence's orphaned grandson, becomes close friends with the sisters, particularly the tomboyish Jo.

The girls keep busy as the war goes on. Meg is invited to spend two weeks with rich friends, where there are parties and cotillions for the girls to dance with boys and improve their social skills. Laurie is invited to one of the dances, and Meg's friends incorrectly think she is in love with him. Meg is more interested in John Brooke, Laurie's young tutor. Two of Jo's stories are printed in the newspaper. Beth becomes friends with Mr. Laurence, who gives her a piano.

Word comes that Mr. March is ill with pneumonia and Marmee leaves to nurse him in Washington, DC. Mr. Laurence offers to accompany her, but she declines, knowing travel would be uncomfortable for the old man. Mr. Laurence then sends John Brooke to do his business in Washington and help the Marches. While in Washington, John confesses his love for Meg to her parents. They are pleased but consider Meg too young to marry, so John agrees to wait.

While Marmee is in Washington, Beth contracts scarlet fever after spending time with the Hummel family, where three children die. As a precaution, Amy is sent to live with Aunt March and replaces Jo as her companion and helper. Jo, who already had scarlet fever, tends to Beth. After many days of illness, the family doctor advises the family send for Marmee. Beth recovers, but never fully regains her health and energy.

On Christmas Day, a year after the book's opening, the girls' father returns home. John proposes to Meg, who accepts, and it is agreed that they will marry in three years.

=== Part two ===
(Published separately in the United Kingdom as Good Wives)

This opens with Meg and John's wedding three years after Part one's conclusion. In the interval Laurie has started college and John joined the military and served in the war. After being wounded, he returned to find work and to buy a house for him and Meg. Meg and John wed and work to adjust to married life. When they have twins, Meg is a devoted mother but John begins to feel neglected. Meg seeks advice from Marmee, who helps her find balance by making more time for wifely duties and encouraging John to become more involved with child-rearing.

Several of Jo's stories are published, providing income to help support the family. She writes a novel that gets published but is frustrated to have to edit it down and can't comprehend the conflicting critical response. Laurie graduates from college, doing well in his last year with Jo's prompting. Amy is chosen over Jo to go on a European tour with her aunt. Beth's health is weak due to complications from scarlet fever which lowers her spirits. While trying to understand Beth's sadness, Jo realizes that Laurie has fallen in love. At first she believes it is with Beth, but soon senses it is with herself. Jo confides in Marmee, telling her that she loves Laurie like a brother but does not love him in a romantic way.

Jo wants a little adventure and to put distance between herself and Laurie, hoping he will overcome his feelings. She spends six months in New York City with a friend of her mother who runs a boarding house, serving as governess for her two children. Jo takes German lessons from another boarder, Professor Friedrich Bhaer. He has come from Berlin to care for his sister's orphaned sons. For extra money, Jo anonymously writes salacious romance stories for sensational newspapers. Suspecting her secret, Friedrich comments that such writing is unprincipled and base, which persuades Jo to give up that literary genre. As Jo's time in New York ends, she is unaware that Friedrich is in love with her. When she returns to Massachusetts, Laurie proposes marriage, which she declines.

Laurie travels to Europe with his grandfather to escape his heartbreak. At home, Beth's scarlet fever has left her permanently weakened. Jo becomes devoted to caring for her dying sister. Laurie encounters Amy in Europe and slowly falls in love with her, seeing her in a new light. She is unimpressed by his aimless, idle, and forlorn attitude since being rejected by Jo. She inspires him to find his purpose in life and do something worthwhile. News of Beth's death brings them together and a romance soon grows. Amy's aunt will not allow Amy to return home with Laurie and his grandfather unchaperoned. Amy and Laurie marry before leaving Europe.

Friedrich, in Massachusetts on business, visits the Marches daily for two weeks. On his last day, he proposes to Jo, who realizes she loves him and they become engaged. Because Friedrich is poor, he must first establish a good income and goes west to teach. A year passes without much success. Later, Aunt March dies and leaves her large estate, Plumfield, to Jo. She marries Friedrich and turns the house into a school for boys. They have two sons, and Amy and Laurie have a daughter. At apple-picking time, Marmee celebrates her 60th birthday at Plumfield, with her husband, her three surviving daughters, their husbands, and five grandchildren.

== Characters ==
=== Margaret "Meg" March ===
Meg, the oldest sister, is 16 when the story begins. She is described as a beauty, and she manages the household when her mother is absent. She has long brown hair and blue eyes and particularly beautiful hands, and she is seen as the prettiest of the sisters. Meg fulfils expectations for women of the time; from the start, she is already a nearly perfect "little woman", in the eyes of the world. Before her marriage to John Brooke, while still living at home, she often lectures her younger sisters to ensure they grow to embody the title of "little women".

Meg is employed as a governess for the Kings, a wealthy local family. Because of their father's family's social standing, Meg makes her debut into high society, but she is lectured by her friend and neighbor, Theodore "Laurie" Laurence, for behaving like a snob. Meg marries John Brooke, Laurie's tutor. They have twins, Margaret "Daisy" Brooke and John Laurence "Demi" Brooke. The sequel, Little Men, mentions a baby daughter, Josephine "Josie" Brooke, who is 14, at the beginning of the final book.

According to Sarah Elbert, "democratic domesticity requires maturity, strength, and above all, a secure identity that Meg lacks". Others believe Alcott does not intend to belittle Meg for her ordinary life and writes her with loving detail, suffused with sentimentality.

=== Josephine "Jo" March ===
The principal character, Jo, 15 years old at the beginning of the book, is a strong and willful young woman, struggling to subdue her fiery temper and stubborn personality.

The second-oldest of the four sisters, Jo is masculine, the smartest, most creative one in the family; her father has referred to her as his "son Jo", and her best friend and neighbor, Theodore "Laurie" Laurence, sometimes calls her "my dear fellow", while she, alone, calls him Teddy. Jo has a "hot" temper that often leads her into trouble. With the help of her own misguided sense of humor, her sister, Beth, and her mother, she works on controlling it. It has been said that much of Louisa May Alcott shows through in these characteristics of Jo. In her essay, "Recollections of My Childhood," Alcott refers to herself as a tomboy who enjoyed boys' activities, like running foot-races and climbing trees.

Jo loves literature, both reading and writing. She composes plays for her sisters to perform and writes short stories. She initially rejects the idea of marriage and romance, feeling that it would break up her family and separate her from the sisters whom she adores. While pursuing a literary career in New York City, she meets Friedrich Bhaer, a German professor. On her return home, Laurie proposes marriage to Jo, which she rejects, thus confirming her independence. Another reason for the rejection is that the love that Jo has for Laurie is more a brotherly love, rather than romantic love, the difference between which he was unable to understand, because he was "just a boy," as said by Alcott in the book.

After Beth dies, Professor Bhaer woos Jo at her home, when "they decide to share life's burdens, just as they shared the load of bundles on their shopping expedition". She is 25 years old when she accepts his proposal. The marriage is deferred, until her unexpected inheritance of her Aunt March's home, a year later. According to critic Barbara Sicherman, "The crucial first point is that the choice is hers, its quirkiness another sign of her much-prized individuality." They have two sons, Robert "Rob" Bhaer and Theodore "Ted" Bhaer. Jo also writes the first part of Little Women during the second portion of the novel. According to Elbert, "her narration signals a successfully completed adolescence".

=== Elizabeth "Beth" March ===
Beth, 13 when the story starts, is described as kind, gentle, sweet, shy, quiet, honest, and musical. She is the shyest March sister and the pianist of the family. Infused with quiet wisdom, she is the peacemaker of the family, and she gently scolds her sisters, when they argue. As her sisters grow up, they begin to leave home, but Beth has no desire to leave her house or family. She is especially close to Jo: when Beth develops scarlet fever, after visiting the Hummels, Jo does most of the nursing and rarely leaves her side. Beth recovers from the acute disease, but her health is permanently weakened.

As she grows, Beth begins to realize that her time with her loved ones is coming to an end. Finally, the family accepts that Beth will not live much longer. They make a special room for her, filled with all the things she loves best: her kittens, her piano, Father's books, Amy's sketches, and her beloved dolls. She is never idle; she knits and sews things for the children who pass by on their way to and from school. However, eventually she puts down her sewing needle, saying it has grown "heavy". Beth's final sickness has a strong effect on her sisters, especially Jo, who resolves to live her life with more consideration and care for everyone. The main loss during Little Women is the death of beloved Beth. Her "self-sacrifice is ultimately the greatest in the novel. She gives up her life, knowing that it has had only private, domestic meaning."

=== Amy Curtis March ===
Amy is the youngest sister and the baby of the family; she is 12 when the story begins. Interested in art, she is described as a "regular snow-maiden", with curly golden hair and blue eyes, "pale and slender" and "always carrying herself" like a proper young lady. She is the artist of the family. Often coddled, because she is the youngest, Amy can behave in a vain and self-centered way, though she does still love her family. She has the middle name Curtis, and is the only March sister to use her full name, rather than a diminutive.

Amy's aunt chooses her to accompany her to Europe, rather than her sister, Jo. There, she matures and makes a decision, based on her limited artistic talent, how to direct her adult life. She encounters Theodore "Laurie" Laurence and his grandfather during the extended visit. Amy is the least inclined of the sisters to sacrifice and self-denial. She behaves well in upper-class society and is at ease with herself. Critic Martha Saxton observes that the author was never fully at ease with Amy's moral development, and her success in life seemed relatively accidental. However, Amy's morality does appear to develop throughout her adolescence and early adulthood, and she can confidently and justly put Laurie in his place when she believes he is wasting his life on pleasurable activities. Ultimately, Amy is shown to work hard to gain what she wants and make the most of her success, when she has it. She marries Laurie after Jo rejected him. They have a daughter, Elizabeth "Bess" Laurence, named after her late sister, Beth.

=== Additional characters ===
The March Sisters by Pablo Marcos

- Margaret "Marmee" March – The girls' mother and head of household, while her husband is away. She engages in charitable works and lovingly guides her girls' morals and their characters. She once confesses to Jo that her temper is as volatile as Jo's, but has learned to control it. Somewhat modeled after the author's own mother, she is the focus around which the girls' lives unfold, as they grow.
- Robert March – Formerly wealthy, the father is portrayed as having helped a friend who could not repay a debt, resulting in his family's genteel poverty. A scholar and a minister, he served as a chaplain in the Union Army during the Civil War, and was wounded in December 1862. After the war, he becomes minister to a small congregation.
- Professor Friedrich Bhaer – A middle-aged, "philosophically inclined," and penniless German immigrant living in New York City. He had been a noted professor in Berlin. Also known as Fritz, he initially lives in Mrs. Kirke's boarding house and works as a language master. He and Jo become friends, and he critiques sensational stories. He encourages her to become a serious writer, instead of writing sensational stories for weekly tabloids. "Bhaer has all the qualities Bronson Alcott lacked: warmth, intimacy, and a tender capacity for expressing his affection—the feminine attributes Alcott admired and hoped men could acquire in a rational, feminist world." They eventually marry and raise his two orphaned nephews, Franz and Emil, and their own sons, Rob and Ted. Bhaer's characterization was inspired by multiple men whom Alcott was attracted to or admired, including Henry David Thoreau, Ralph Waldo Emerson, Charles Follen and Johann Wolfgang von Goethe, the latter of whom Alcott considered her "chief idol".
- Robert & Theodore Bhaer ("Rob" and "Ted") – Jo's and Fritz's sons, introduced in the final pages of the novel, named after the March girls' father and Laurie.
- John Brooke – During his employment as a tutor to Laurie, he falls in love with Meg. He accompanies Mrs. March to Washington, D.C., when her husband is ill with pneumonia. When Laurie leaves for college, Brooke continues his employment with Mr. Laurence as a bookkeeper. When Aunt March overhears Meg accepting John's declaration of love, she threatens Meg with disinheritance, because she suspects that Brooke is only interested in Meg's prospects. Eventually, Meg admits her feelings to Brooke, they defy Aunt March (who ends up accepting the marriage), and they are engaged. Brooke serves in the Union Army for a year, and is sent home as an invalid when he is wounded. Brooke marries Meg a few years later, when the war has ended, and she has turned twenty. Brooke was modeled after John Bridge Pratt, Alcott's sister Anna's husband.
- Margaret & John Laurence Brooke ("Daisy" and "Demijohn/Demi") – Meg's twin son and daughter. Daisy is named after both Meg and Marmee, while Demi is named after John and the Laurence family.
- Josephine Brooke ("Josy" or "Josie") – Meg's youngest child, named after Jo. She develops a passion for acting as she grows up.
- Uncle and Aunt Carrol – Sister and brother-in-law of Mr. March. They take Amy to Europe with them, where Uncle Carrol frequently tries to be like an English gentleman.
- Florence "Flo" Carrol – Amy's cousin, daughter of Aunt and Uncle Carrol, and companion in Europe.
- May and Mrs. Chester – A well-to-do family with whom the Marches are acquainted. May Chester is a girl about Amy's age, who is rich and jealous of Amy's popularity and talent.
- Miss Crocker – An old and poor spinster who likes to gossip and who has few friends.
- Mr. Dashwood – Publisher and editor of the Weekly Volcano.
- Mr. Davis – The schoolteacher at Amy's school. He punishes Amy for bringing pickled limes to school by striking her palm and making her stand on a platform in front of the class. She is withdrawn from the school by her mother.
- Estelle "Esther" Valnor – A French woman employed as a servant for Aunt March who befriends Amy.
- The Gardiners – Wealthy friends of Meg's. Daughter Sallie Gardiner later marries Ned Moffat.
- The Hummels – A poor German family consisting of a widowed mother and six children. Marmee and the girls help them by bringing food, firewood, blankets, and other comforts. They help with minor repairs to their small dwelling. Three of the children die of scarlet fever, and Beth contracts the disease while caring for them. The eldest daughter, Lottchen "Lotty" Hummel, later works as a matron at Jo's school at Plumfield
- The Kings – A wealthy family with four children for whom Meg works as a governess.
- The Kirkes – Mrs. Kirke is a friend of Mrs. March's who runs a boarding house in New York. She employs Jo as governess to her two daughters, Kitty and Minnie.
- The Lambs – A well-off family with whom the Marches are acquainted.
- James Laurence – Laurie's grandfather and a wealthy neighbor of the Marches. Lonely in his mansion and often at odds with his high-spirited grandson, he finds comfort in becoming a benefactor to the Marches. He protects the March sisters while their parents are away. He was a friend of Mrs. March's father and admires their charitable works. He develops a special, tender friendship with Beth, who reminds him of his late granddaughter. He gives Beth the girl's piano.
- Theodore "Laurie" Laurence – A rich young man who lives opposite the Marches, older than Jo but younger than Meg. Laurie is the "boy next door" to the March family and has an overprotective paternal grandfather, Mr. Laurence. After eloping with an Italian pianist, Laurie's father was disowned by his parents. Both Laurie's mother and father died young, so as a boy Laurie was taken in by his grandfather. Preparing to enter Harvard, Laurie is being tutored by John Brooke. He is described as attractive and charming, with black eyes, brown skin, and curly black hair. He later falls in love with Amy, and they marry; they have one child, a little girl named after Beth: Elizabeth "Bess" Laurence. Sometimes Jo calls Laurie "Teddy". Though Alcott did not make Laurie as multidimensional as the female characters, she partly based him on Ladislas Wisniewski, a young Polish émigré she had befriended, and Alf Whitman, a friend from Lawrence, Kansas. According to author and professor Jan Susina, the portrayal of Laurie is as "the fortunate outsider", observing Mrs. March and the March sisters. He agrees with Alcott that Laurie is not strongly developed as a character.
- Elizabeth Laurence ("Bess") – The only daughter of Laurie and Amy, named for Beth. Like her mother, she develops a love for art as she grows up.
- Aunt Josephine March – Mr. March's aunt, a rich widow. Somewhat temperamental and prone to being judgmental, she disapproves of the family's poverty, their charitable work, and their general disregard for the more superficial aspects of society's ways. Her vociferous disapproval of Meg's impending engagement to the impoverished Mr. Brooke becomes the proverbial "last straw" that actually causes Meg to accept his proposal. She appears to be strict and cold, but deep down, she's really quite soft-hearted. She dies near the end of the first book, and Jo and Friedrich turn her estate into a school for boys.
- Annie Moffat – A fashionable and wealthy friend of Meg and Sallie Gardiner.
- Ned Moffat – Annie Moffat's brother, who marries Sallie Gardiner.
- Hannah Mullet – The March family maid and cook, their only servant. She is of Irish descent and very dear to the family. She is treated more like a member of the family than a servant.
- Miss Norton – A friendly, well-to-do tenant living in Mrs. Kirke's boarding house. She occasionally invites Jo to accompany her to lectures and concerts.
- Susie Perkins – A girl at Amy's school.
- The Scotts – Friends of Meg and John Brooke. John knows Mr. Scott from work.
- Tina – The young daughter of an employee of Mrs. Kirke. Tina loves Mr. Bhaer and treats him like a father.
- The Vaughans – English friends of Laurie's who come to visit him. Kate is the oldest of the Vaughan siblings, and prim and proper Grace is the youngest. The middle siblings, Fred and Frank, are twins; Frank is the younger twin.
- Fred Vaughan – A Harvard friend of Laurie's who, in Europe, courts Amy. Rivalry with the much richer Fred for Amy's love inspires the dissipated Laurie to pull himself together and become more worthy of her. Amy eventually rejects Fred, knowing she does not love him, and decides not to marry out of ambition.
- Frank Vaughan – Fred's twin brother, is mentioned a few times in the novel. When Fred and Amy both travel through Europe, Fred leaves because he hears his twin is ill.

== Inspiration ==
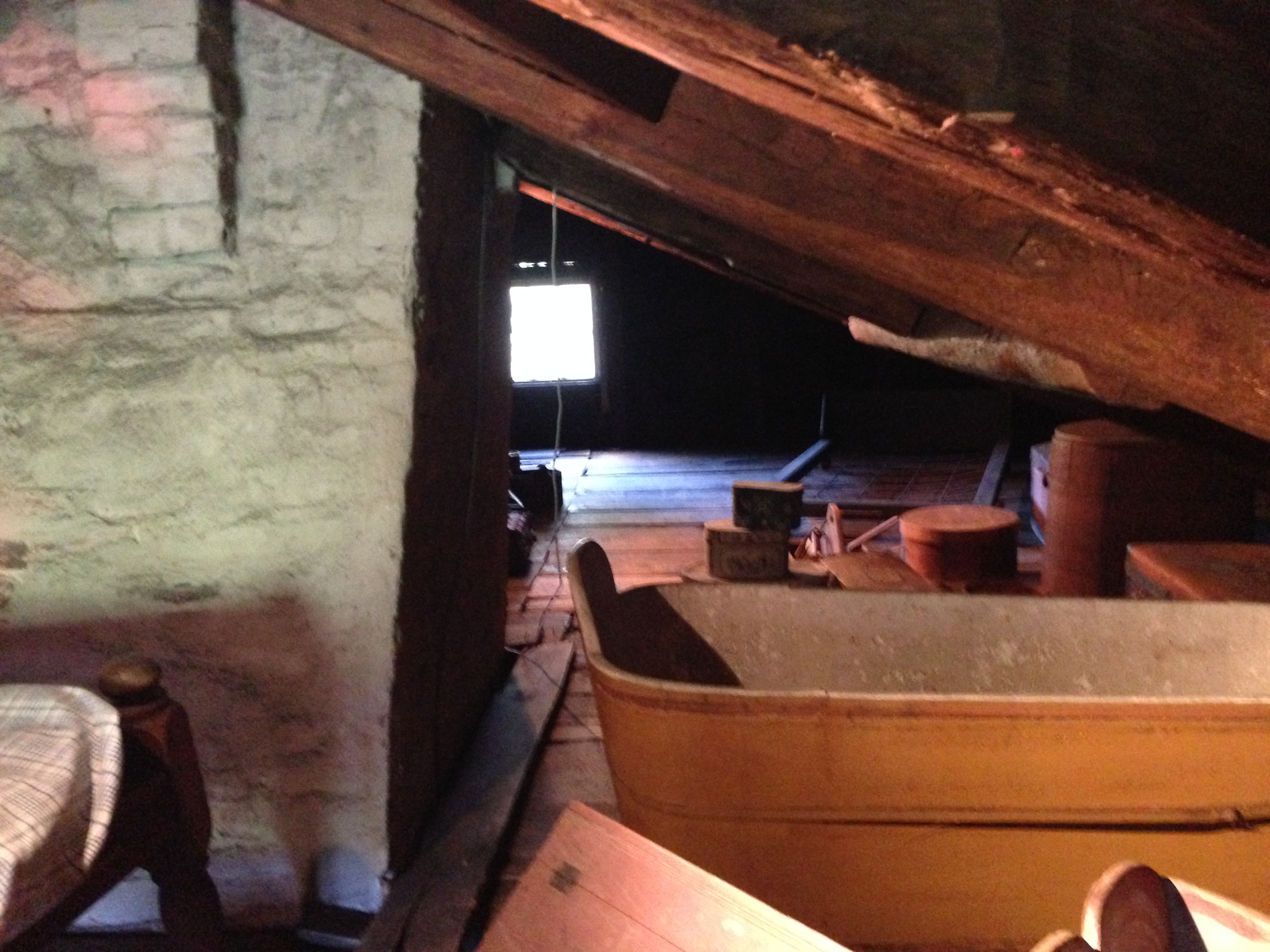
The attic at Fruitlands where Alcott lived and acted out plays at 11 years old. Note that the ceiling area is around 4 feet high

For her books, Alcott was often inspired by familiar elements. The characters in Little Women are recognizably drawn from family members and friends. Her married sister Anna was Meg, the family beauty. Lizzie, Alcott's beloved sister, was the model for Beth. Like Beth, Lizzie was quiet and retiring. She died tragically at age twenty-three from the lingering effects of scarlet fever, as did Beth. May, Alcott's strong-willed sister, was portrayed as Amy, whose pretentious affectations cause her occasional downfalls. Alcott portrayed herself as Jo. Alcott readily corresponded with readers who addressed her as "Miss March" or "Jo", and she did not correct them.

However, Alcott's portrayal, even if inspired by her family, is an idealized one. For instance, Mr. March is portrayed as a hero of the American Civil War, a gainfully employed chaplain, and, presumably, a source of inspiration to the women of the family. He is absent for most of the novel. In contrast, Bronson Alcott was very present in his family's household, due in part to his inability to find steady work. While he espoused many of the educational principles touted by the March family, he was loud and dictatorial. His lack of financial independence was a source of humiliation to his wife and daughters. The March family is portrayed as living in genteel penury, but the Alcott family, dependent on an improvident, impractical father, suffered real poverty and occasional hunger. In addition to her own childhood and that of her sisters, scholars who have examined the diaries of Louisa Alcott's mother, Abigail Alcott, have surmised that Little Women was also heavily inspired by Abigail Alcott's own early life. Originally, Alcott did not want to publish Little Women, claiming she found it boring, and wasn't sure how to write girls as she knew few beyond her sisters. However, encouraged by her editor Thomas Niles, she wrote it within 10 weeks.

Also, Little Women has several textual and structural references to John Bunyan's novel The Pilgrim's Progress. Jo and her sisters read it at the outset of the book and try to follow the good example of Bunyan's Christian. Throughout the novel, the main characters refer many times to The Pilgrim's Progress and liken the events in their own lives to the experiences of the pilgrims. Several chapter titles directly reference characters and places from The Pilgrim's Progress.

In addition to drawing on her own life during the development of Little Women, Alcott also took influence from several of her earlier works including "The Sisters' Trial", "A Modern Cinderella", and "In the Garret". The characters within these short stories and poems, in addition to Alcott's own family and personal relationships, inspired the general concepts and bases for many of the characters in Little Women.

== Publication history ==
The first volume of Little Women was published in 1868 by Roberts Brothers. The first edition included illustrations by Abigail May Alcott, the sister commonly called "May" who inspired the fictional Amy March. She "struggled" with her illustrative additions to her sister's book, but later improved her skills and found some success as an artist.

The first printing of 2,000 copies sold out quickly, and the company had trouble keeping up with the demand for additional printings. They announced: "The great literary hit of the season is undoubtedly Miss Alcott's Little Women, the orders for which continue to flow in upon us to such an extent as to make it impossible to answer them with promptness." The last line of Chapter 23 in the first volume states: "So the curtain falls upon Meg, Jo, Beth, and Amy. Whether it ever rises again, depends upon the reception given the first act of the domestic drama called Little Women." Alcott delivered the manuscript for the second volume on New Year's Day 1869, just three months after publication of part one.

Versions in the late 20th and 21st centuries combine both Little Women and Good Wives into one book under the title Little Women, with the latter marked as Part 2 (chapters 24 to 47). Each chapter is numbered and has a title as well. Part 2, Chapter 24 opens with: "In order that we may start afresh and go to Meg's wedding with free minds, it will be well to begin with a little gossip about the Marches."

The British influence, giving Part 2 its own title, Good Wives, has the book still published in two volumes, with Good Wives beginning three years after Little Women ends, especially in the UK and Canada, but also with some US editions. Some editions listed under Little Women appear to include both parts, especially in the audiobook versions. Editions are shown in continuous print from many publishers, as hardback, paperback, audio, and e-book versions, from the 1980s onwards.

== Reception ==
G. K. Chesterton believed Alcott in Little Women, "anticipated realism by twenty or thirty years", and that Fritz's proposal to Jo, and her acceptance, "is one of the really human things in human literature". Gregory S. Jackson said that Alcott's use of realism belongs to the American Protestant pedagogical tradition, which includes a range of religious literary traditions with which Alcott was familiar. He has copies in his book of nineteenth-century images of devotional children's guides which provide background for the game of "pilgrims progress" that Alcott uses in her plot of Book One.

Little Women was well received upon first publication. According to 21st-century critic Barbara Sicherman there was, during the 19th century, a "scarcity of models for nontraditional womanhood", which led more women to look toward "literature for self-authorization. This is especially true during adolescence." Little Women became "the paradigmatic text for young women of the era and one in which family literary culture is prominently featured". Adult elements of women's fiction in Little Women included "a change of heart necessary" for the female protagonist to evolve in the story.

In the late 20th century, some scholars criticized the novel. Sarah Elbert, for instance, wrote that Little Women was the beginning of "a decline in the radical power of women's fiction", partly because women's fiction was being idealized with a "hearth and home" children's story. Women's literature historians and juvenile fiction historians have agreed that Little Women was the beginning of this "downward spiral". But Elbert says that Little Women did not "belittle women's fiction" and that Alcott stayed true to her "Romantic birthright".

Little Women's popular audience was responsive to ideas of social change as they were shown "within the familiar construct of domesticity". While Alcott had been commissioned to "write a story for girls", her primary heroine, Jo March, became a favorite of many different women, including educated women writers through the 20th century. The girl story became a "new publishing category with a domestic focus that paralleled boys' adventure stories".

One reason the novel was so popular was that it appealed to different classes of women along with those of different national backgrounds, at a time of high immigration to the United States. Through the March sisters, women could relate and dream where they may not have before. "Both the passion Little Women has engendered in diverse readers and its ability to survive its era and transcend its genre point to a text of unusual permeability."

At the time, young girls perceived that marriage was their end goal. After the publication of the first volume, many girls wrote to Alcott asking her "who the little women marry". Sicherman said that the ending, which she personally characterizes as "unsatisfying", worked to "keep the story alive" as if the reader might find it ended differently upon different readings. Anne E. Boyd contends that "Alcott particularly battled the conventional marriage plot in writing Little Women". Alcott did not have Jo accept Laurie's hand in marriage; rather, when she arranged for Jo to marry, she portrayed an unconventional man as her husband. In Sicherman's opinion, Alcott used Friedrich to "subvert adolescent romantic ideals" because he was much older and seemingly unsuited for Jo. However, the character was partially based upon older men Alcott was attracted to, such as Henry David Thoreau and Ralph Waldo Emerson, or admired, such as German writers Charles Follen and Johann Wolfgang von Goethe. In particular, Alcott had considered Goethe her "chief idol" since the day Emerson had introduced her to Goethe and handed her a copy of Wilhelm Meister's Apprenticeship Bhaer is also representative of Alcott's reverence for German culture.

In 2003 Little Women was ranked number 18 in The Big Read, a survey of the British public by the BBC to determine the "Nation's Best-loved Novel" (not children's novel); it is fourth-highest among novels published in the U.S. on that list. Based on a 2007 online poll, the U.S. National Education Association listed it as one of its "Teachers' Top 100 Books for Children". In 2012 it was ranked number 47 among all-time children's novels in a survey published by School Library Journal, a monthly with primarily US audience.

== Influence ==
Little Women has been one of the most widely read novels, noted by Stern from a 1927 report in The New York Times and cited in Little Women and the Feminist Imagination: Criticism, Controversy, Personal Essays. Ruth MacDonald argued that "Louisa May Alcott stands as one of the great American practitioners of the girls' novel and the family story".

In the 1860s, gendered separation of children's fiction was a newer division in literature. This division signaled a beginning of polarization of gender roles as social constructs "as class stratification increased". Joy Kasson wrote, "Alcott chronicled the coming of age of young girls, their struggles with issues such as selfishness and generosity, the nature of individual integrity, and, above all, the question of their place in the world around them." Girls related to the March sisters in Little Women, along with following the lead of their heroines, by assimilating aspects of the story into their own lives.

After reading Little Women, some women felt the need to "acquire new and more public identities," however dependent on other factors, such as financial resources. While Little Women showed the regular lives of American middle-class girls, it also "legitimized" their dreams to do something different and allowed them to consider the possibilities. More young women started writing stories that had adventurous plots and "stories of individual achievement—traditionally coded male—challenged women's socialization into domesticity". Little Women also influenced contemporary European immigrants to the United States who wanted to assimilate into the middle-class culture.

In the pages of Little Women, young and adolescent girls read the normalization of ambitious women. This provided an alternative to the previously normalized gender roles. Little Women repeatedly reinforced the importance of "individuality" and "female vocation". Little Women had "continued relevance of its subject" and "its longevity points, as well to surprising continuities in gender norms from the 1860s at least through the 1960s". Those interested in domestic reform could look to the pages of Little Women to see how a "democratic household" would operate.

While "Alcott never questioned the value of domesticity," she challenged the social constructs that made spinsters obscure and fringe members of society, solely because they were not married. "Little Women indisputably enlarges the myth of American womanhood, by insisting that the home and the women's sphere cherish individuality and thus produce young adults who can make their way in the world, while preserving a critical distance from its social arrangements." As with all youth, the March girls had to grow up. These sisters, and in particular, Jo, were apprehensive about adulthood, because they were afraid that, by conforming to what society wanted, they would lose their special individuality.

Alcott's Jo also made professional writing imaginable for generations of women. Writers as diverse as Maxine Hong Kingston, Margaret Atwood, and J. K. Rowling have noted the influence of Jo March on their artistic development. Even other fictional portraits of young women aspiring to authorship often reference Jo March.

Alcott's novel is often celebrated for Jo and her narrative arc in which she becomes a self-determined woman with a career. However, framing this novel as a success, solely for Jo's accomplishments, portrays it as a "traditional 'lone genius' patriarchal narrative" in which only women who are "categorized as 'exceptional' or particularly 'worthy'" are celebrated. Little Women awards all its women worthy, despite their status as conventional or unconventional—not just Jo, who is the obvious exception to societal expectation. Alcott's novel celebrates the agency of women, the four sisters and their mother, to choose their path in life. Meg makes the decision to marry and have children and though it is the traditional pathway, she makes the choice for her own happiness. Thus, reducing Alcott's novel to just Jo's experience as an exception promotes it as a patriarchal narrative and erases her careful work to portray a matriarchal narrative, rich with female agency and voice.

Alcott "made women's rights integral to her stories, and above all, to Little Women". Alcott's fiction became her "most important feminist contribution"—even considering all the effort Alcott made to help facilitate women's rights". She thought that "a democratic household could evolve into a feminist society." In Little Women, she imagined that just such an evolution might begin with Plumfield, a nineteenth-century feminist utopia.

Little Women has a timeless resonance which reflects Alcott's grasp of her historical framework in the 1860s. The novel's ideas do not intrude themselves upon the reader because the author is wholly in control of the implications of her imaginative structure. Sexual equality is the salvation of marriage and the family; democratic relationships make happy endings. This is the unifying imaginative frame of Little Women.

The book has been compared to the 1982 romance novel Lace by Shirley Conran, where the lives of four women are followed similarly.

== Adaptations ==
=== Stage ===
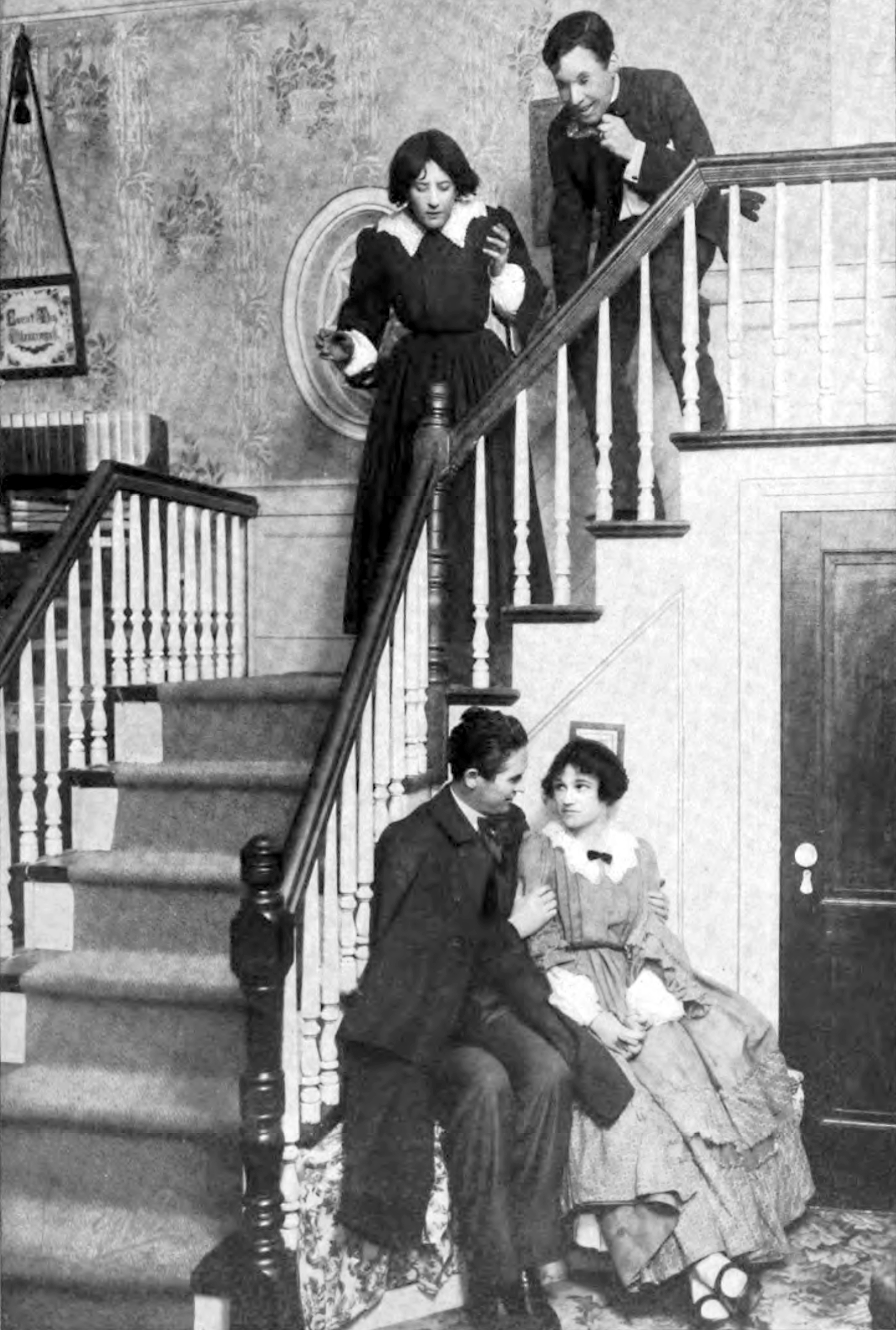
Scene from the 1912 Broadway production of Little Women, adapted by Marian de Forest

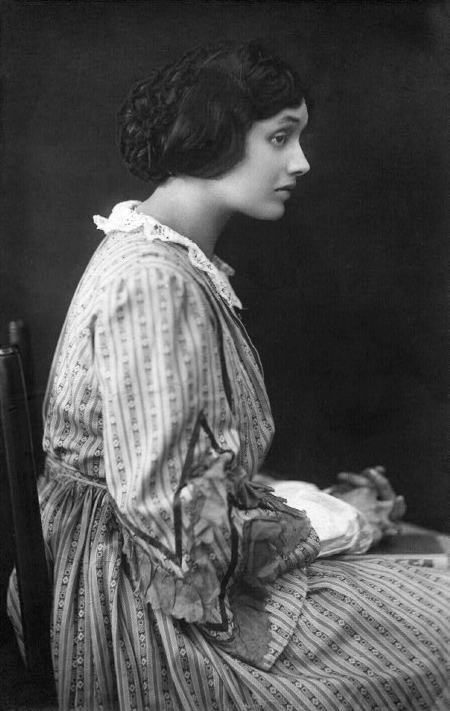
Katharine Cornell became a star in the 1919 London production of de Forest's adaptation of Little Women.

- Marian de Forest adapted Little Women for the Broadway stage in 1912 with Marie Pavey as Jo. The 1919 London production made a star of Katharine Cornell, who played the role of Jo.
- Isabella Russell-Ides created two stage adaptations. Her Little Women featured an appearance by the author. Jo & Louisa features a confrontation between the unhappy character, Jo March, who wants rewrites from her author.
- A new adaptation by playwright Kate Hamill had its world premiere in 2018 at the Jungle Theater in Minneapolis, followed by a New York premiere in 2019 at Primary Stages directed by Sarna Lapine.
- A new adaptation by playwright Lauren Gunderson made its rolling world premiere in 2024 at Northlight Theatre in Skokie directed by Georgette Verdin, followed by a West Coast premiere in 2025 at Theatreworks Silicon Valley directed by Giovanna Sardelli.

=== Film ===
Little Women has been adapted to film seven times. The first adaptation was a silent film directed by Alexander Butler and released in 1917, which starred Daisy Burrell as Amy, Mary Lincoln as Meg, Ruby Miller as Jo, and Muriel Myers as Beth. It is considered a lost film.

Another silent film adaptation was released in 1918 and directed by Harley Knoles. It starred Isabel Lamon as Meg, Dorothy Bernard as Jo, Lillian Hall as Beth, and Florence Flinn as Amy. It is also considered a lost film.

George Cukor directed the first sound adaptation of Little Women, starring Katharine Hepburn as Jo, Joan Bennett as Amy, Frances Dee as Meg, and Jean Parker as Beth. The film was released in 1933. In Radio City Music Hall the film was "breaking box-office records" in the fall of 1933, and Hepburn received top billing. It was followed by an adaptation of Little Men the following year.

The first color adaptation starred June Allyson as Jo, Margaret O'Brien as Beth, Elizabeth Taylor as Amy, and Janet Leigh as Meg. Directed by Mervyn LeRoy, it was released in 1949. The film received two Academy Award nominations for color film, for Best Cinematography and Best Art Direction/Set Direction, the latter for which it received the Oscar.

Gillian Armstrong directed a 1994 adaptation, starring Winona Ryder as Jo, Trini Alvarado as Meg, Samantha Mathis and Kirsten Dunst as Amy, Claire Danes as Beth, Christian Bale as Laurie and Susan Sarandon as Marmee. The film received three Academy Award nominations, including Best Actress for Ryder.

A contemporary film adaptation was released in 2018 to mark the 150th anniversary of the novel. It was directed by Clare Niederpruem in her directorial debut and starred Sarah Davenport as Jo, Allie Jennings as Beth, Melanie Stone as Meg, and Elise Jones and Taylor Murphy as Amy.

Writer and director Greta Gerwig took on the story in her 2019 adaptation of the novel. The film stars Saoirse Ronan as Jo, Emma Watson as Meg, Florence Pugh as Amy, Laura Dern as Marmee, Meryl Streep as Aunt March, Eliza Scanlen as Beth and Timothee Chalamet as Laurie. The film received six Academy Award nominations, including Best Picture.

=== Television ===
Little Women was adapted into a television musical, in 1958, by composer Richard Adler for CBS.

Little Women has been made into a serial four times by the BBC: in 1950 (when it was shown live), in 1958, in 1970, and in 2017. The 3-episode 2017 series development was supported by PBS, and was aired as part of the PBS Masterpiece anthology in 2018.

In 1950, the American anthology series Studio One aired a two-part adaptation consisting of two hour-long episodes on CBS. The first was Little Women: Meg's Story on December 18, followed by Little Women: Jo's Story on Christmas day. Meg's Story was directed by Paul Nickell and Jo's Story by Lela Swift. It featured a teleplay by Sumner Locke Elliott and starred Nancy Marchand as Jo, June Dayton as Beth, Peg Hillias as Mrs. March, Lois Hall as Amy, Mary Sinclair as Meg, Elizabeth Patterson as Aunt March, Kent Smith as Bhaer, John Baragrey as Mr. Brooks, Berry Kroeger as Mr. Laurence, Una O'Connor as Hannah, and Conrad Bain Dr. Bangs. In 1958, CBS aired a musical version starring Florence Henderson.

Universal Television produced a two-part miniseries based on the novel, which aired on NBC in 1978. It was followed by a 1979 series.

In the 1970s and 1980s, multiple anime adaptations were made. In 1977, an episode based on a small part of the first volume aired in the anthology anime series Manga Fairy Tales of the World. In 1980, an anime special was made as a predecessor to the 26-part 1981 anime series Little Women. Then, in 1987, another adaptation titled Tales of Little Women was released as part of Nippon Animation's World Masterpiece Theater. All anime specials and series were dubbed in English and shown on American television. Ai no Wakakusa Monogatari can be streamed on Amazon Prime.

In 2012, Lifetime aired The March Sisters at Christmas, a contemporary television film focusing on the title characters' efforts to save their family home from being sold. In 2017, BBC television aired a miniseries adaptation developed by Heidi Thomas, directed by Vanessa Caswill. The three one-hour episodes were first broadcast on BBC One on Boxing Day 2017 and the following two days. The cast included Maya Hawke, Emily Watson, Michael Gambon and Angela Lansbury. A 2018 adaption is that of Manor Rama Pictures LLP of Karan Raj Kohli & Viraj Kapur which streams on the ALTBalaji app in India. The web series is called Haq Se. Set in Kashmir, the series is a modern-day Indian adaptation of the book. A South Korean adaptation was developed and produced by Studio Dragon for local cable network tvN and Netflix. Written by Chung Seo-kyung and directed by Kim Hee-won, it aired in September 2022.

=== Musicals and opera ===
The novel was adapted to a musical of the same name with a book by Allan Knee, lyrics by Mindi Dickstein, and music by Jason Howland and debuted on Broadway at the Virginia Theatre on January 23, 2005 and closed on May 22, 2005 after 137 performances. A production was also staged in Sydney, Australia in 2008.

Eleanor Everest Freer adapted Little Women as an opera, writing both the score and libretto. Freer's opera, a two-act work in English, debuted in Chicago at the Musician's Club of Women on April 2, 1934.

The Houston Grand Opera commissioned and performed Little Women in 1998. The opera was aired on television by PBS in 2001 and has been staged by other opera companies since the premiere.

=== Audio drama ===
- For three weeks a daily 15-minute radio serialization starring Elaine Kent, Patricia Ryan, Joyce Howard, and Sammie Hill was broadcast on Mutual radio, running from February 9 to February 27, 1942.
- An hour-long radio drama starring Katharine Hepburn, Oscar Homolka, John Lodge, Frances Reed, Judith Parrish, Susan Douglas, and Elliot Reed was broadcast December 23, 1945 from the stage of the Vanderbilt Theater in New York by Theatre Guild on the Air.
- A dramatized version, produced by Focus on the Family Radio Theatre, was released on September 4, 2012.
- A ten-part full cast dramatisation was broadcast on BBC Radio 4 in 2017.
- A radio play, produced by Far From the Tree Productions, was released in episodes from November 14 to December 19, 2020.
- A twenty-three episode series, produced by TWI Media, that released each chapter diegetically from December 2022 through January 2024.

=== Literature ===
The novel has inspired a number of other literary retellings by various authors. Books inspired by Little Women include the following:

- Hello Beautiful by Ann Napolitano
- His Little Women by Judith Rossner
- The Little Women by Katharine Weber
- March by Geraldine Brooks
- Little Women and Werewolves by Porter Grand
- Little Vampire Women by Lynn Messina
- Little Women on Their Own by Jane Nardin
- This Wide Night by Sarvat Hasin
- Marmee by Sarah Miller
- Littler Women by Laura Schaefer
- The Spring Girls by Anna Todd
- Meg, Jo, Beth, and Amy by Rey Terciero and Bre McCoy
- The Penderwicks by Jeanne Birdsall
- The Poisonwood Bible by Barbara Kingsolver
- My Little Pony: Classics Reimagined: Little Filles, a retelling of Little Women with Twilight Sparkle, Rainbow Dash, Fluttershy, and Rarity as Meg, Jo, Beth, and Amy respectively. This adaption is aimed at children, removing most of the serious plot points and changing the character's roles (Meg wishing to open a School of Friendship rather than debuting into high society), along with the characters frequently breaking the fourth wall, meta-references, questioning their roles, and interacting directly with the reader. Instead of Beth (Fluttershy) dying from scarlet fever, she is instead sent on a permanent vacation by Discord and later reunited with her family in the ending. Finally resulting in Joe dying in the future (Time not said).

My Brilliant Friend by Elena Ferrante includes a child writer who loves reading Little Women.

=== Web series ===
The March Family Letters was released by Pemberley Digital on YouTube in 2015, reimagining the story in a series of vlogs released twice a week. The series reimagined the sisters as a modern-day family in Toronto making their vlogs for their mother, who is serving with the Canadian Armed Forces. The team incorporated social media by giving the main characters their own real-life accounts on Facebook, Twitter, and Tumblr. The series was created by Sarah Shelson and Lauren Evans.

== See also ==
- Hillside, the Alcott family home (1845–1848) and setting for some of the book's scenes
- Orchard House, the later Alcott family home (1858–1877) and site where the book was written
