= Teck Theatre =

Coordinates: 42°53′42″N 78°52′18″W

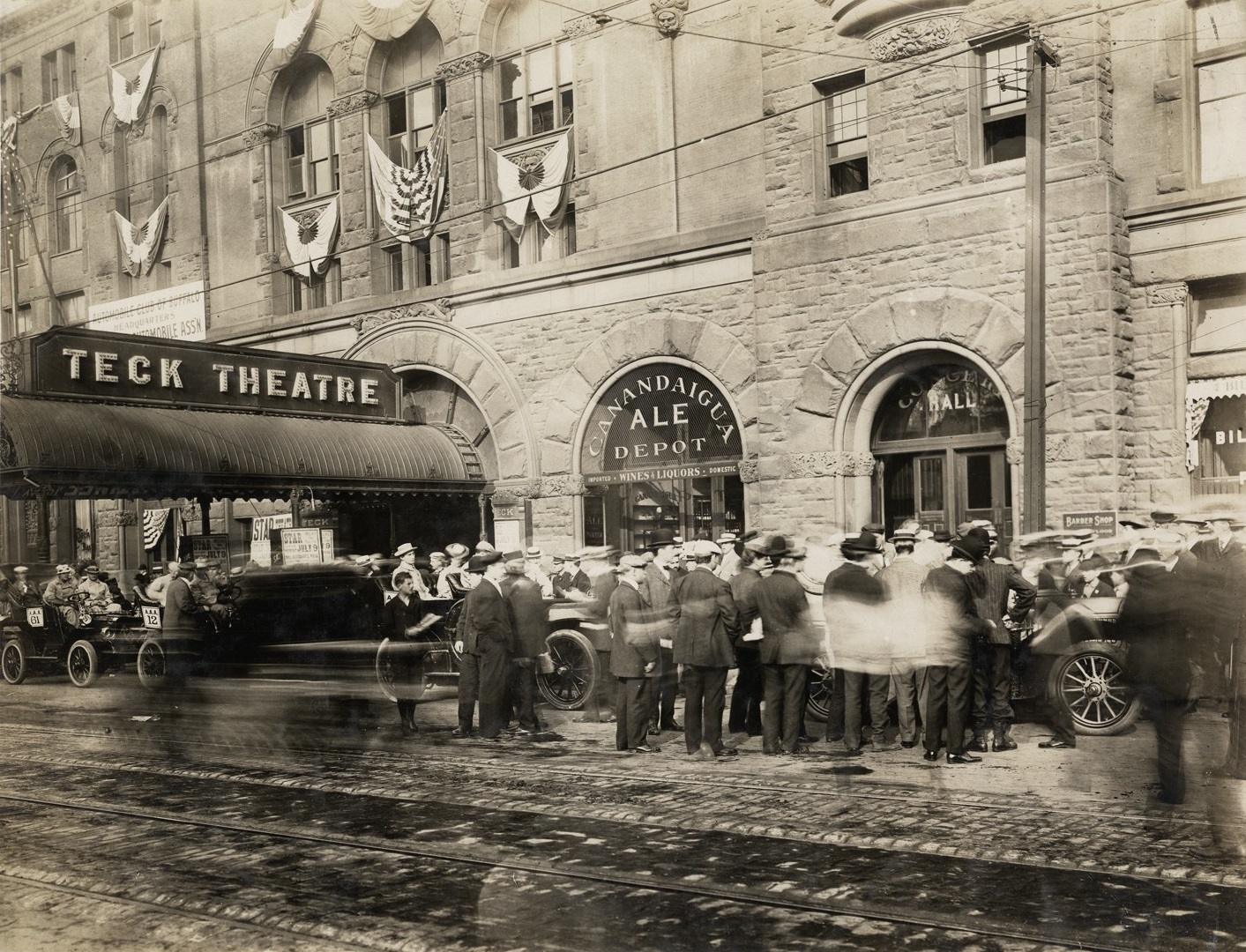
Exterior of the Teck Theatre in 1908.

The Teck Theatre, was a theatre located at 760 Main St. in Buffalo, New York on the Southwest corner of the intersection of Edward St. and Main St. It opened in 1888 as the Music Hall, replacing an earlier theater of that same name which had been destroyed by fire in 1885. (Note: It should not be confused with Shea's Music Hall, a different building in Buffalo which opened two years later in 1890.) Its name was changed to the Teck Theatre in 1900 after undergoing a substantial remodel. In 1908 the theatre was leased by the The Shubert Organization and was rebranded the Shubert-Teck Theatre. The Shubert Organization continued to lease the theater through 1933.

After the Shubert organization left the Teck Theatre was occupied by the Studio Theatre Players from 1934-1937. The commercial portion of the building was demolished in 1942, but the theatre space itself remained standing while being completely gutted of its interior decoration. It was rebuilt as a cinema, Shea's Teck Theatre, and operated as a part of various theatre chains into the early 1980s. In December 1982 much of the building was completely demolished with only the front facade of the building remaining in order to make way for a new road. The facade of the theatre lasted until it too was demolished in 1992.

== History ==
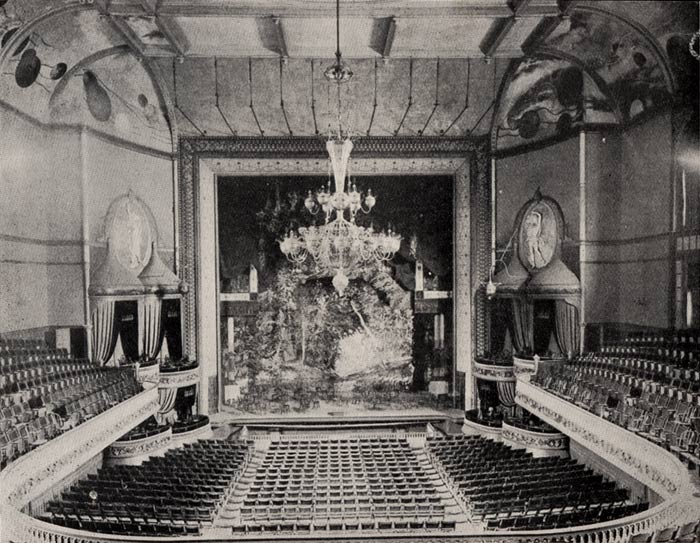
1912 photograph of the interior of the Teck Theatre.

The Music Hall opened on February 7, 1888. It was designed by architect Richard A. Waite, and was built to replace the former Music Hall which had burned to the ground on March 25, 1885. It subsequently was substantially remodeled in 1900 in honor of Jacob F. Schoellkopf (died 1899) and was re-named the Teck Theatre (TT) after the city of Kirchheim unter Teck where Schoellkopf was born. The remodeling of the theatre was overseen by architect August C. Esenwein. The New York firm of Brickelman & Stevens was hired to do the interior decorating of the theatre.

The significantly altered TT re-opened on September 10, 1900 with a production of David Belasco's The Charity Ball presented by the Shubert Stock Company with a cast including Georgia Cayvan, Bessie Tyree, Effie Shannon, Blanche Whiffen, William J. Le Moyne, Herbert Kelcey, and Nelson Wheatcroft. Composer F. W. Kraft was the music director of the theater's resident orchestra when it opened. In 1908 the theatre was leased by the The Shubert Organization and was re-branded the Shubert-Teck Theatre. The Shubert Organization maintained its lease until ending it 1933.

The United States premiere of Lord Dunsany's The Gods of the Mountain was given at the TT on April 8, 1912. Marian de Forest's play Little Women was given its world premiere at the TT on January 22, 1912. Other world premieres at the TT included Oskar Nedbal's operetta The Peasant Girl (November 16, 1914) Sigmund Romberg's musical Maid in America (February 9, 1915), Guy Bolton's Her Game (June 21, 1915), Rudolf Friml's Kitty Darlin' (September 10, 1917), Willard Mack's The Noose (October 4, 1926), and Margaret Ayer Barnes's The Age of Innocence (November 12, 1928).

In 1935 the TT was acquired by MassMutual. The Studio Theatre Players were still actively using the theater as late as 1937. Some sources say the theatre was demolished in 1942. However, a history of the theatre published in Marquee in 1971 gives a different and more complex account. According to scholar Daniel C. Harter MassMutual came into agreement with the Shea theatre empire to convert the building into a cinema in 1941. Partial demolition of the four story commercial portion of the building did occur, but the theater space itself remained standing while simultaneously being completely gutted of its ornate baroque style interior. Construction stalled during World War II, and the commercial area of the building was completely rebuilt into a one story shopping center, while the theatre portion was converted into the promised cinema, Shea's Tech Theatre (STT).

STT officially opened on February 7, 1946. The Shea's theatre chain was co-operated by Paramount Pictures and Loews Cineplex Entertainment during STT's history as a movie theatre until 1950 when STT come solely under the Loews organization. In 1951 it was purchased by the Rosokoffs, a local real estate firm, and in 1952 it was sold to Fabian Enterprises Inc. (which became Stanley Warner Corporation in 1953). In 1958 it became once again a Loews theatre. The theatre remained operational into the early 1980s, but by December 1982 it had closed when much of the back portion of the building was demolished to create a new road connecting Pearl and Main Streets. The facade of the front portion of the theatre remained standing until it too was demolished in 1992 to make way for a parking lot.

== Notes and references ==
=== Bibliography ===
- Bieron, Joseph F.; McCarthy, Paul (2007). Postcard Views: A Walk Down Main Street Buffalo, New York, Circa 1910. City of Light Publishing. ISBN 9780978847647.
- Schweitzer, Darrell (1989). Pathways to Elfland: The Writings of Lord Dunsany. Owlswick Press. ISBN 9780913896167.
