= Playhouse Theatre (New York City) =

Former theatre in Manhattan, New York

- Interactive map of Playhouse Theatre
- Address: 137 West 48th Street; New York, New York; United States
- Coordinates: 40°45′34″N 73°58′57″W
- Owner: Brady Enterprises, Inc.
- Operator: William A. Brady
- Capacity: 865
- Type: Broadway

Construction
- Opened: 1911
- Demolished: 1969
- Years active: 1911–1967
- Architect: Charles A. Rich

The Playhouse Theatre was a Broadway theater at 137 West 48th Street in midtown Manhattan, New York City. Charles A. Rich was the architect. It was built in 1911 for producer William A. Brady who also owned the nearby 48th Street Theatre. After 1944, it was sold to the Shubert Organization. From 1949 to 1952, it was an ABC Radio studio.

Sauce for the Goose was the opening production on April 15, 1911, closing after 2 performances that day.

The Playhouse Theatre was used for interiors and exteriors in the Mel Brooks film The Producers (1967) to depict the staging of the musical Springtime for Hitler, and the exterior was shown as the venue for the last Broadway appearance of the fading star Neely O'Hara in the film Valley of the Dolls (1967).

In 1969, the Playhouse Theatre was razed to accommodate the construction of 1221 Avenue of the Americas.

== Notable productions ==
- Little Women (1912)
- The Family Cupboard (1913)
- Major Barbara (1915)
- The Man Who Came Back (1916)
- The Little Teacher (1918)
- Forever After (1918)
- The Wonderful Thing (1920)
- Romance (1921)
- On the Stairs (1922)
- Up She Goes (1922)
- Chains (1923)

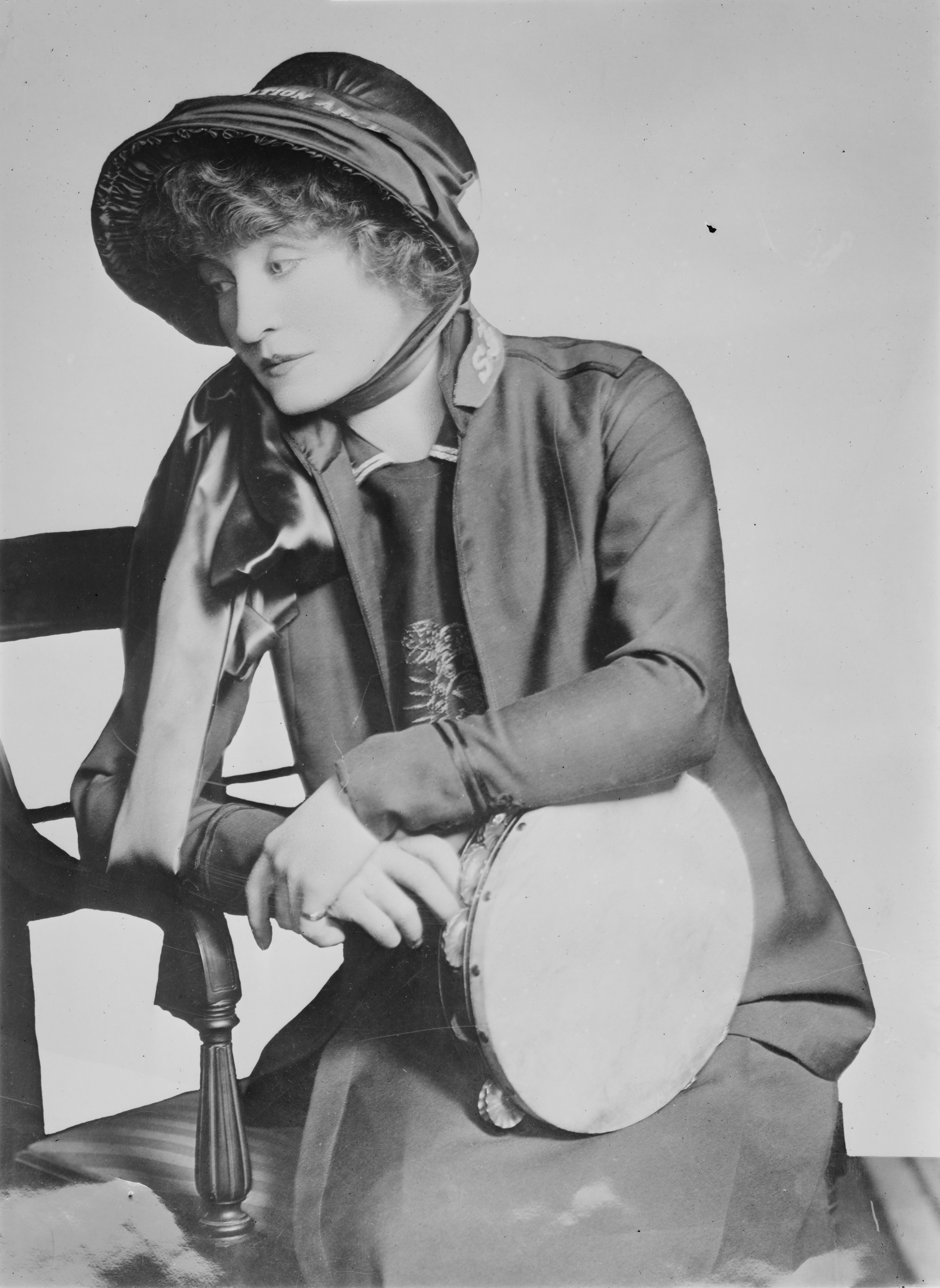
Grace George in Major Barbara (1915)

- The Show Off (1924)
- Twelve Miles Out (1925)
- Kitty's Kisses (1926)
- The Road to Rome (1927) and revival (1928)
- The Queen's Husband (1928)
- Street Scene (1929)
- The First Mrs. Fraser (1929)
- The Vinegar Tree (1930)
- A Church Mouse (1931)
- Mademoiselle (1932)
- Three Men on a Horse (1935)
- Yes, My Darling Daughter (1937)
- Outward Bound (1938)
- Spring Again (1942)
- The Damask Cheek (1942)
- The Duke in Darkness (1944)
- The Glass Menagerie (1945)
- Edith Piaf (1947)
- The Innocents (1950)
- The King of Friday's Men (1951)
- Bernardine (1952)
- Fallen Angels (1956)
- Night of the Auk (1956)
- Blue Denim (1958)
- Make a Million (1958)
- The Miracle Worker (1959)
- Never Too Late (1962)
- The Impossible Years (1965)
