= Marian de Forest =

American journalist (1864–1935)

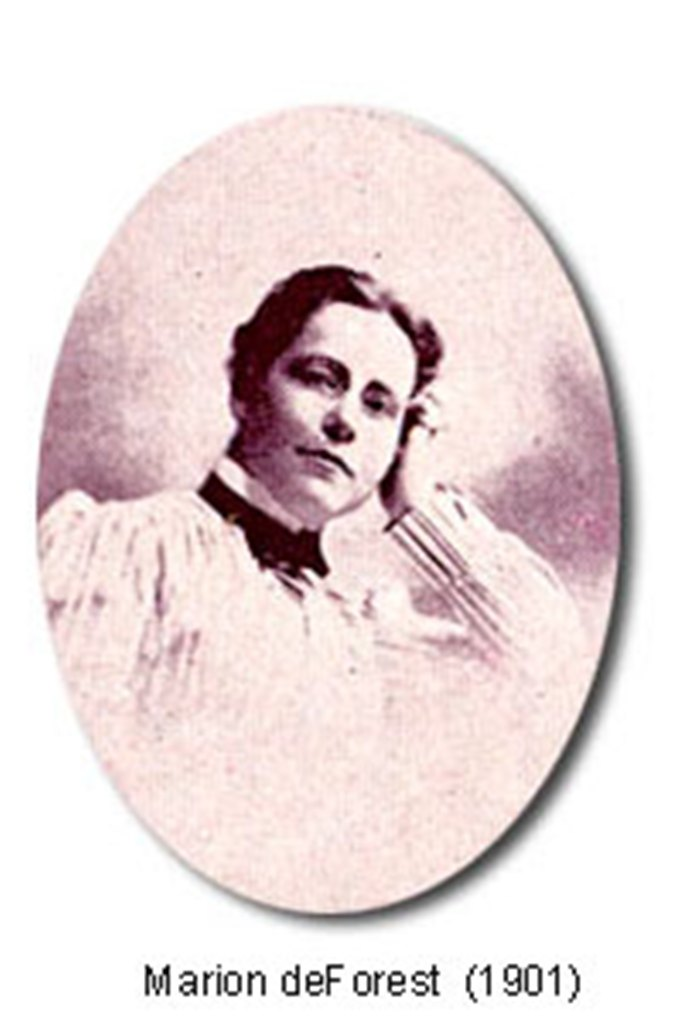
Marian de Forest (1901)

Marian de Forest (February 27, 1864 – February 17, 1935) was an American journalist, playwright, major force in the progressive women's movement, and founder of Zonta (later Zonta International), a service organization of women professionals. She was inducted into the National Women's Hall of Fame in 2001.

== Biography ==
She graduated from Buffalo Seminary in 1884. Thereafter, she became one of the first female reporters in Western New York State and wrote for The Buffalo Evening News and then with The Buffalo Commercial.

As a leading playwright, she supported women's role in the theater. This included writing roles for women including her play Little Women which was adapted from the novel of the same name by Louisa May Alcott and was first staged on Broadway in 1912. It was subsequently revived on Broadway in 1917, 1931, 1944, and 1946, and was frequently performed in regional theatres in the United States during the 20th century. De Forest also co-founded the Buffalo Musical Foundation, thereby bringing the American Opera Company to Western New York. She also played a prominent role in the formation of the Buffalo Philharmonic Orchestra.

In 1919, she founded Zonta, "a service organization of executive women working to improve the legal, political, economic and professional status of women worldwide." Zonta is a Lakota Sioux Indian word that means "honest and trustworthy." In one of her early speeches, de Forest explained, "Zonta stands for the highest standards in the business and professional world ... seeks cooperation rather than competition and considers the Golden Rule not only good ethics but good business". De Forest envisioned Zonta to become an international organization. In her own words, "This is the woman's age and in distant lands and foreign climes women of all nations are rallying to the call … Zonta is given the opportunity of uniting them into one great, glorious whole."

De Forest's drama papers are in the collection of the Buffalo History Museum.
