= The Young Millionaire =

- Produced by: The Kalem Company
- Starring: Earle Foxe; Alice Joyce
- Distributed by: General Film Company
- Release date: November 13, 1912
- Running time: Short
- Country: United States
- Languages: Silent film English intertitles

The Young Millionaire is a 1912 short silent film drama. The film starred Earle Foxe and Alice Joyce who were acting together in their third film that year, having already starred in The Street Singer and The County Fair. It was the third film of Earle Foxe, aged seventeen.

== Cast ==
- Tom Moore as John Harris
- Alice Joyce as Anna Newton
- Earle Foxe
- Hazel Neason as Sarah Curtis
- Stuart Holmes
