= A Battle of Wits =

A Battle of Wits can refer to:

- A Battle of Wits (1912 film), an American silent film
- A Battle of Wits (2006 film), a Hong Kong war film
- "A Battle of Wits", third episode of the 1965 Doctor Who serial The Time Meddler
