= Edith Reeves =

American actress

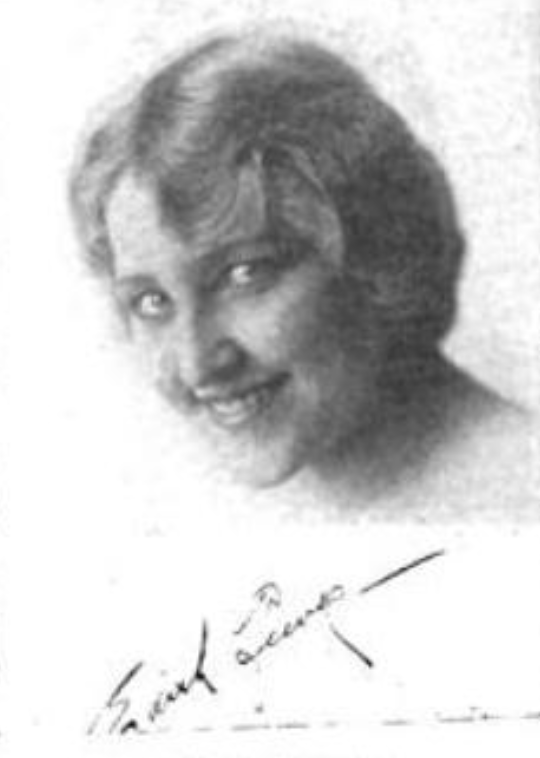
- Reeves, from a 1916 publication
- Other names: Peggy Tenbrook, Edith Lampe
- Occupation: Actress

Edith Reeves was an American silent film actress who also appeared on Broadway in the 1900s and 1910s. She sometimes used the stage name Peggy Tenbrook.

== Career ==
Reeves was from Auburn, New York. She was well known to American theater audiences, including appearances on Broadway and in vaudeville programs. She was in the New York cast of Take My Advice in 1911 and 1912, co-written by and starring William Collier. Reeves and her husband William Lampe toured in Ivy Ashton Root's "tabloid drama", One Flight Up, in 1913 and 1914. She also had roles in George Ade's Just Out of College and The Man of the Hour.

The Lost Secret (1915) featured Reeves in her second screen appearance, alongside Paul Gilmore. She teamed with Frank Mills and Howard Hickman in The Moral Fabric (1916), directed by Thomas H. Ince. Reeves plays a wife who is bored with her traditional husband and becomes attracted to a cult of free love. Her last film role was Ruth in The Song of the Soul (1918), directed by Tom Terriss and co-starring Alice Joyce. Percy Standing, and Walter McGrall.

In 1920, Reeves and her husband presented One Flight Up in vaudeville programs again.

== Filmography ==
- The Chaperon (1912)
- The Lost Secret (1915)
- A Gentleman's Agreement (1915)
- The Moral Fabric (1916)
- The Hoyden (1916)
- The Painted Madonna (1917)
- The Song of the Soul (1918)

== Personal life ==
Reeves married fellow actor William Lampe in 1907. They had a son, William, born in Philadelphia in 1908.
