= The Crooked Billet =

1929 British film by Adrian Brunel

- Directed by: Adrian Brunel
- Written by: Angus MacPhail
- Produced by: Michael Balcon
- Starring: Madeleine Carroll; Carlyle Blackwell; Miles Mander; Gordon Harker
- Cinematography: Claude L. McDonnell
- Music by: Louis Levy
- Production company: Gainsborough Pictures
- Distributed by: Woolf & Freedman Film Service
- Release date: May 1929
- Running time: 82 minutes
- Country: United Kingdom
- Languages: Sound Part-Talkie; English Intertitles

The Crooked Billet is a 1929 British sound part-talkie drama film directed by Adrian Brunel and starring Madeleine Carroll, Carlyle Blackwell and Miles Mander. It was released in both silent and sound versions, as its production came as the industry was shifting over. It was made by Gainsborough Pictures at their Islington Studios. The sound version features some sequences with audible dialogue. The rest of the film featured English intertitles with a synchronized musical score and sound effects.

It was one of the first films to use RCA's synchronized sound system for dialogue.

The plot has been summarized as: "An international spy searches for lost documents hidden in an old inn."

It is listed on the British Film Institute's 75 Most Wanted list of lost films. The film surfaced in France in December 2021 but the BFI refused to pay the asking price, so the only known 16mm copy is owned by a French individual.

== Cast ==
- Carlyle Blackwell as Dietrich Hebburn
- Madeleine Carroll as Joan Easton
- Miles Mander as Guy Morrow
- Gordon Harker as Slick
- Kim Peacock as Philip Easton
- Danny Green as Rogers
- Frank Goldsmith as Sir William Easton
- Alexander Field as Alf

== Reprise ==
An identically titled film with a similar theme was released in 2017. A sequel was released in 2018, and a third feature is planned.
