= County Fair =

County Fair may refer to:

== Film ==
- The County Fair (1912 film), an American short silent drama film
- The County Fair (1920 film), a silent American film
- Kounty Fair, a 1930 animated short featuring Oswald the Lucky Rabbit
- The County Fair (1934 film), an animated short featuring Oswald the Lucky Rabbit
- The County Fair (1932 film), an American film directed by Louis King
- County Fair (1937 film), an American film by Howard Bretherton
- County Fair (1950 film), an American film by William Beaudine

== Other uses ==
- County fair or agricultural show
- "County Fair" (Beach Boys song)
- "County Fair" (Moldy Peaches song)
- "The County Fair" (The Naked Brothers Band), an episode of The Naked Brothers Band

== See also ==
- Country Fair (disambiguation)
