= His Brother's Wife (1916 film) =

1916 film by Harley Knoles

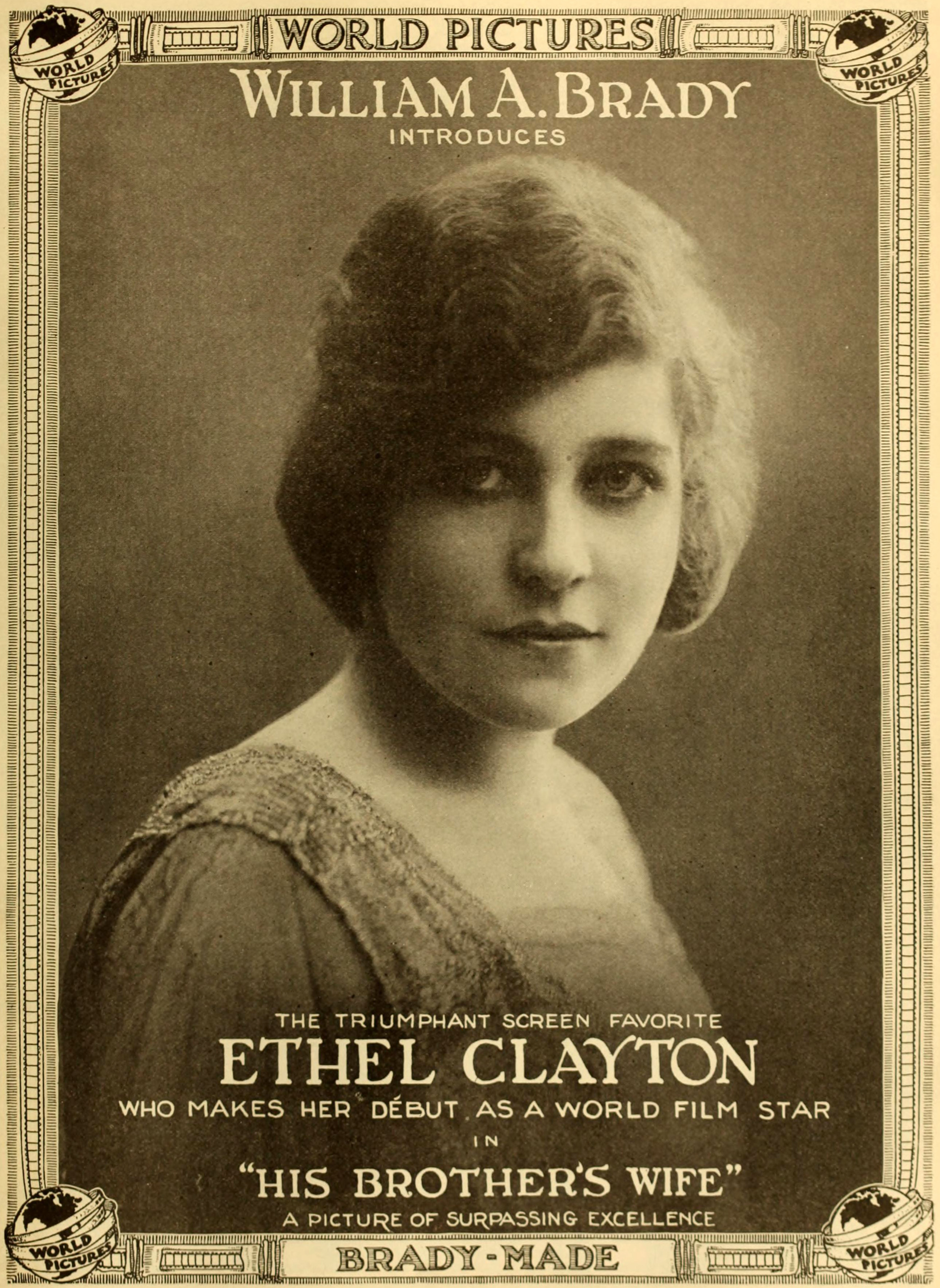
- Advertisement
- Directed by: Harley Knoles
- Written by: Harley Knoles
- Based on: The Woman of It play by Er. Lawsche
- Produced by: William A. Brady
- Starring: Carlyle Blackwell; Ethel Clayton
- Cinematography: Arthur Edeson
- Production company: Premo Feature Film Corp.
- Distributed by: World Film Company
- Release date: June 5, 1916
- Running time: 5 reels
- Country: United States
- Language: Silent (English intertitles)

His Brother's Wife is a 1916 American silent drama film directed by Harley Knoles and starring Carlyle Blackwell and Ethel Clayton. It was produced by Premo Feature Film Corporation and distributed by the World Film Company.

== Cast ==
- Carlyle Blackwell as Howard Barton
- Ethel Clayton as Helen Barton
- Paul McAllister as Richard Barton
- Loel Stewart as The Barton Child
- Charles K. Gerrard

== Reception ==
Motography reviewer Hugh Hoffman gave the film a positive review, saying of the cinematography "The photographer's name is not given, but it should be, because his work is very fine."

The New York Clipper's review was negative, describing the film as being "a tiresome bit of mechanical and ultra conventional melodramatic nonsense."

Lynde Denig's review for Moving Picture World was positive, finding the story to be "adequate" and the actors as having done "their share."

== Preservation status ==
A complete copy of the film survives in the Library of Congress collection.
