= The Fire Coward =

1913 film

The Fire Coward is a 1913 American short silent film drama. The film starred Earle Foxe, Irene Boyle, Stuart Holmes, and James B. Ross in the lead roles.
