= Country Fair =

Country Fair may refer to:

- Country Fair (film), a 1941 American film by Frank McDonald
- Song of the Plough or Country Fair, a 1933 British film
- Country Fair, a monthly magazine from the early 1950s to 1960s edited by Macdonald Hastings with A. G. Street
- Country Fair, a convenience store chain owned by United Refining Company
- Oregon Country Fair

== See also ==
- Agricultural show
- County Fair (disambiguation)
