= Alexander Field (actor) =

English actor (1892–1971)

- Born: 6 June 1892; London, England
- Died: 17 August 1971 (aged 79); London, England
- Occupation: Actor
- Years active: 1926 - 1960 (film)

Alexander Field (6 June 1892 – 17 August 1971) was an English film and television actor.

== Career ==
Alexander Field first appeared on stage at the London Palladium in 1912 and in the following year at the Gaiety Theatre in Manchester. He joined Sir Philip Ben Greet's Shakespearian productions and remained with them for some time. Field also played in some silent pictures before the First World War. He served in the war and, after demobilisation, he continued his stage and film careers. His stage work included a role in the original production of R.C. Sherriff's Journey's End, directed by James Whale, at the Apollo Theatre in 1928.

== Partial filmography ==
- The Crooked Billet (1929)
- Call of the Sea (1930)
- Beyond the Cities (1930)
- The Last Hour (1930)
- Dante's Mysteries (1931)
- Tin Gods (1932)
- When London Sleeps (1932)
- The Crooked Lady (1932)
- A Safe Proposition (1932)
- Head of the Family (1933)
- Red Wagon (1933)
- Dick Turpin (1933)
- The Double Event (1934)
- No Monkey Business (1935)
- Invitation to the Waltz (1935)
- Limelight (1936)
- Millions (1937)
- Waterloo (1937)
- Make It Three (1938)
- The Return of the Frog (1938)
- The Dark Eyes of London (1939)
- The Torso Murder Mystery (1939)
- The Next of Kin (1942)
- Let the People Sing (1942)
- Welcome, Mr. Washington (1944)
- Loyal Heart (1946)
- Here Come the Huggetts (1948)
- Under the Frozen Falls (1948)
- Warning to Wantons (1949)
- Poet's Pub (1949)
- Waterfront (1950)
- Secret Venture (1955)
- There's Always a Thursday (1957)
- The Woman Eater (1958)
- Undercover Girl (1958)
- Naked Fury (1959)
- Danger List (1959)
