= Stuart Holmes =

American actor (1884–1971)

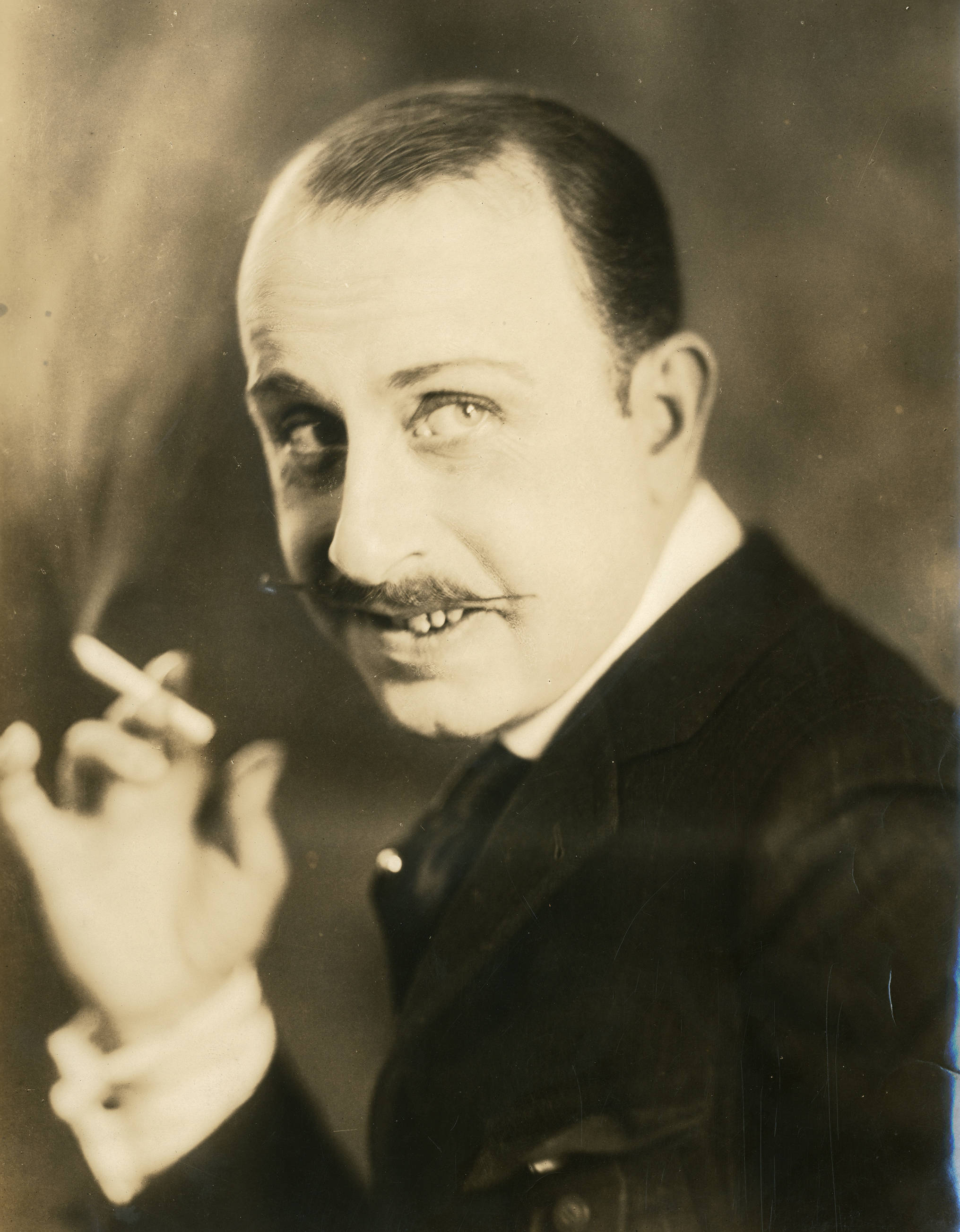
- Holmes, c. 1923
- Born: Joseph Liebchen; March 10, 1884; Chicago, Illinois, U.S.
- Died: December 29, 1971 (aged 87); Hollywood, California, U.S.
- Other name: Stewart Holmes
- Occupations: Actor, sculptor
- Years active: 1909–1964
- Spouse: Blanca Maynard (m. 1916)

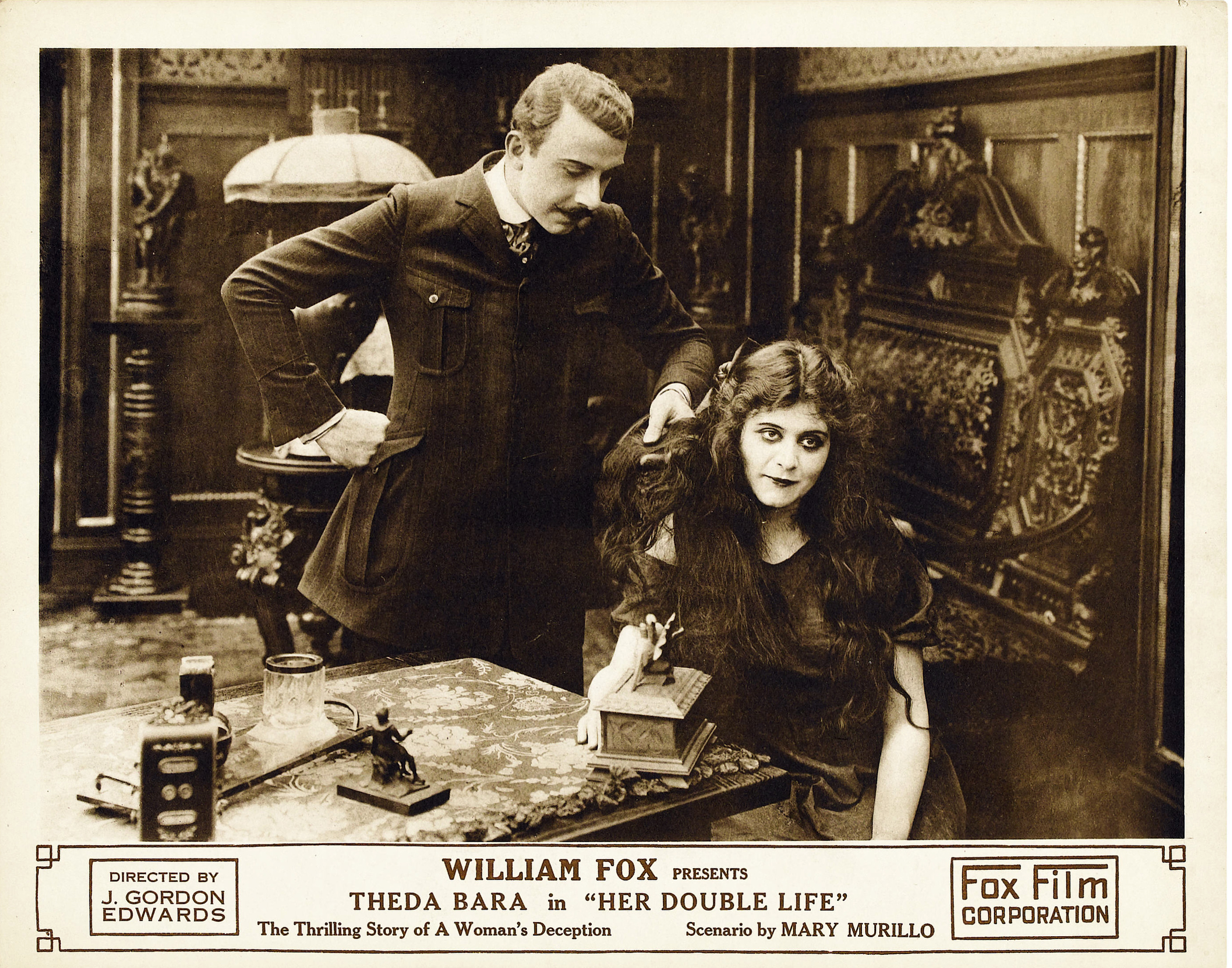
Stuart Holmes and Theda Bara in Her Double Life (1916)

Stuart Holmes (born Joseph Liebchen; March 10, 1884 – December 29, 1971) was an American actor and sculptor whose career spanned seven decades. He appeared in almost 450 films between 1909 and 1964, sometimes credited as Stewart Holmes.

== Biography ==
Holmes was born Joseph Liebchen on March 10, 1884, in Chicago, Illinois, where he was educated.

For 20 years, Holmes performed in vaudeville and on stage, with the latter often being in Shakespeare's plays. His work in the theater included a stint in Germany.

Holmes's film career began in 1911 and ended with an uncredited appearance inYoungblood Hawke (1964).

As a sculptor, Holmes created work for at least three California United States post offices — in Oceanside (1936), Claremont (1937), and Bell (1937).

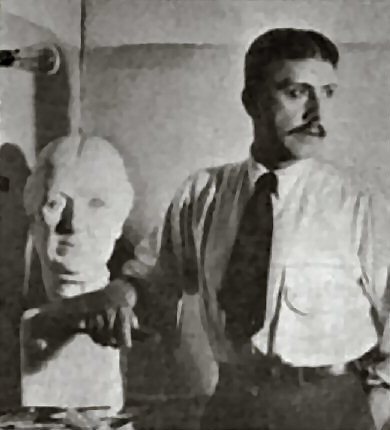
Motion Picture News, 1919

Holmes's wife, Blanca, was an actress.

== Selected filmography ==
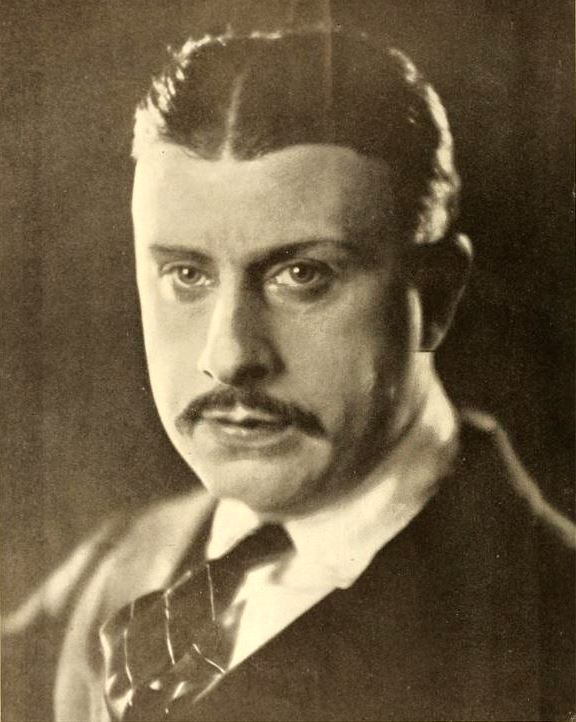
Stuart Holmes, circa 1919

- The Woman Hater (1910, Short) as Carrol Morten
- Oliver Twist (1912)
- The Young Millionaire (1912)
- The Tell-Tale Message (1912)
- A Battle of Wits (1912)
- A Business Buccaneer (1912)
- The Game Warden (1913)
- The Fire Coward (1913)
- The Face at the Window (1913)
- The Pursuit of the Smugglers (1913)
- The Combination of the Safe (1914)
- The Celebrated Scandal (1915)
- The Clemenceau Case (1915)
- A Woman's Resurrection (1915)
- Should A Mother Tell? (1915)
- The Blindness of Devotion (1915)
- The Green-Eyed Monster (1916)
- East Lynne (1916)
- Under Two Flags (1916)
- The Witch (1916)
- Her Double Life (1916)
- Love and Hate (1916)
- Tangled Lives (1917)
- Love's Law (1917)
- Love Aflame (1917)
- The Wild Girl (1917)
- The Ghosts of Yesterday (1918)
- When Men Betray (1918)
- Treason (1918)
- The Poor Rich Man (1918)
- The New Moon (1919)
- The Way of a Woman (1919)
- The Other Man's Wife (1919)
- Trailed by Three (1920)
- Lifting Shadows (1920)
- The Evil Eye (1920)
- Passion Fruit (1921)
- No Woman Knows (1921)
- The Four Horsemen of the Apocalypse (1921)
- All's Fair in Love (1921)
- The Strangers' Banquet (1922)
- Her Husband's Trademark (1922)
- The Prisoner of Zenda (1922)
- Under Two Flags (1922)
- Paid Back (1922)
- The Scarlet Lily (1923)
- The Unknown Purple (1923)
- Daughters of the Rich (1923)
- Temporary Marriage (1923)
- Tipped Off (1923)
- Three Weeks (1924)
- On Time (1924)
- Between Friends (1924)
- Vanity's Price (1924)
- The Beloved Brute (1924)
- The Primrose Path (1925)
- The Salvation Hunters (1925)
- The Fighting Cub (1925)
- Friendly Enemies (1925)
- Steele of the Royal Mounted (1925)
- The Perfect Clown (1925)
- Three Keys (1925)
- Heir-Loons (1925)
- North Star (1925)
- Shadow of the Law (1926)
- Good and Naughty (1926)
- The Midnight Message (1926)
- Beyond the Trail (1926)
- The Hurricane (1926)
- Broken Hearts of Hollywood (1926)
- Duck Soup (1927)
- Polly of the Movies (1927)
- When a Man Loves (1927)
- Your Wife and Mine (1927)
- Burning Daylight (1928)
- The Hawk's Nest (1928)
- Should Tall Men Marry? (1928)
- Devil Dogs (1928)
- The Man Who Laughs (1928) as Lord Dirry-Moir
- The Cavalier (1928)
- Captain of the Guard (1930)
- Belle of the Nineties (1934)
- Bengal Tiger (1936)
- Hearts Divided (1936)
- Penrod and Sam (1937)
- Jezebel (1938) as Doctor at Duel (uncredited)
- Devil's Island (1939)
- The Oklahoma Kid (1939) as President Grover Cleveland (uncredited)
- On Trial (1939)
- Affectionately Yours (1941)
- Yankee Doodle Dandy (1942)
- The Picture of Dorian Gray (1945)
- The Ghost and Mrs. Muir (1947) as Man Ordered Out of Train Compartment by the Captain (uncredited)
- Street Corner (1948)
- Alias Nick Beal (1949) (uncredited)
- People Will Talk (1951) (uncredited)
- Abbott and Costello Meet the Invisible Man (1953)
- Remains to Be Seen (1953)
- Reprisal! (1956)
- The Nutty Professor (1963)
- Mary Poppins (1964)
- Youngblood Hawke (1964)
