= Matt B. Snyder =

Union navy sailor and American actor (1835–1917)

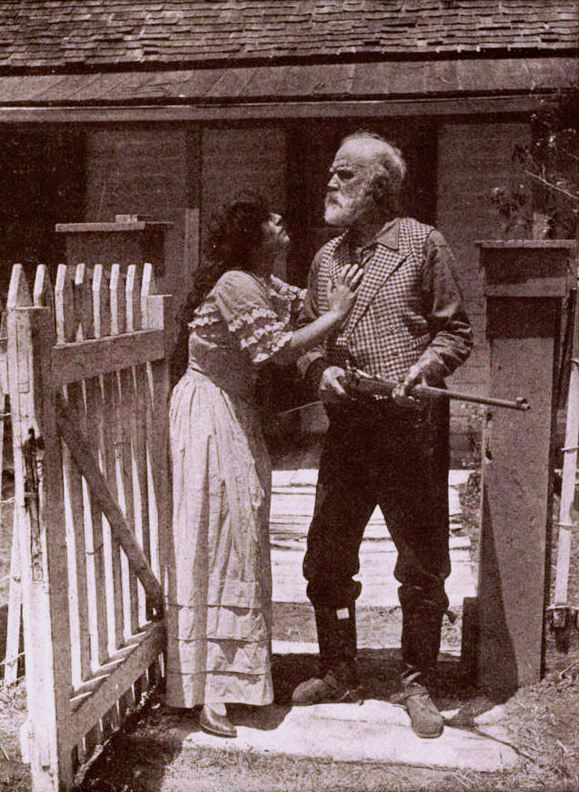
- Beatriz Michelena and Matt B. Snyder in Salomy Jane (1914)
- Born: March 22, 1835
- Died: January 17, 1917 (aged 81); San Francisco, California
- Other names: Matt Snyder; M. B. Snyder
- Occupation: Actor
- Years active: ?1860s - 1917

Matt B. Snyder (March 22, 1835 – January 17, 1917) was an American stage and silent screen actor and a Civil War veteran.

== Biography ==
Snyder (also known as M.B. Snyder) is among the earliest born actors to appear in motion pictures and at his death the oldest actor in movies. Snyder was born when Andrew Jackson was President and died when Woodrow Wilson was President.

During the Civil War Snyder served in the Union Navy and was a gunner on the USS Essex at Vicksburg. In the Victorian and Edwardian eras Snyder and his wife performed on the stage, sometimes on Broadway and much in touring companies as was the norm before motion pictures. In film he had an important role in the 1913 King Baggot Dr. Jekyll and Mr. Hyde. His last film was The Crisis, a film by novelist Winston Churchill about the Civil War which he did not live to see released. The Crisis is a surviving film at the Library of Congress and Snyder can be seen in this role in a still photo in Daniel Blum's Pictorial History of the Silent Screen with his young costar Marshall Neilan.

== Selected filmography ==
- The Cub Reporter's Temptation (1913)
- Dr. Jekyll and Mr. Hyde (1913)
- Oil and Water (1913)
- Salomy Jane (1914)
- The Heart of Maryland (1915)
- The Garden of Allah (1916)
- The Crisis (1916)
