= Honor Among Lovers =

1931 film

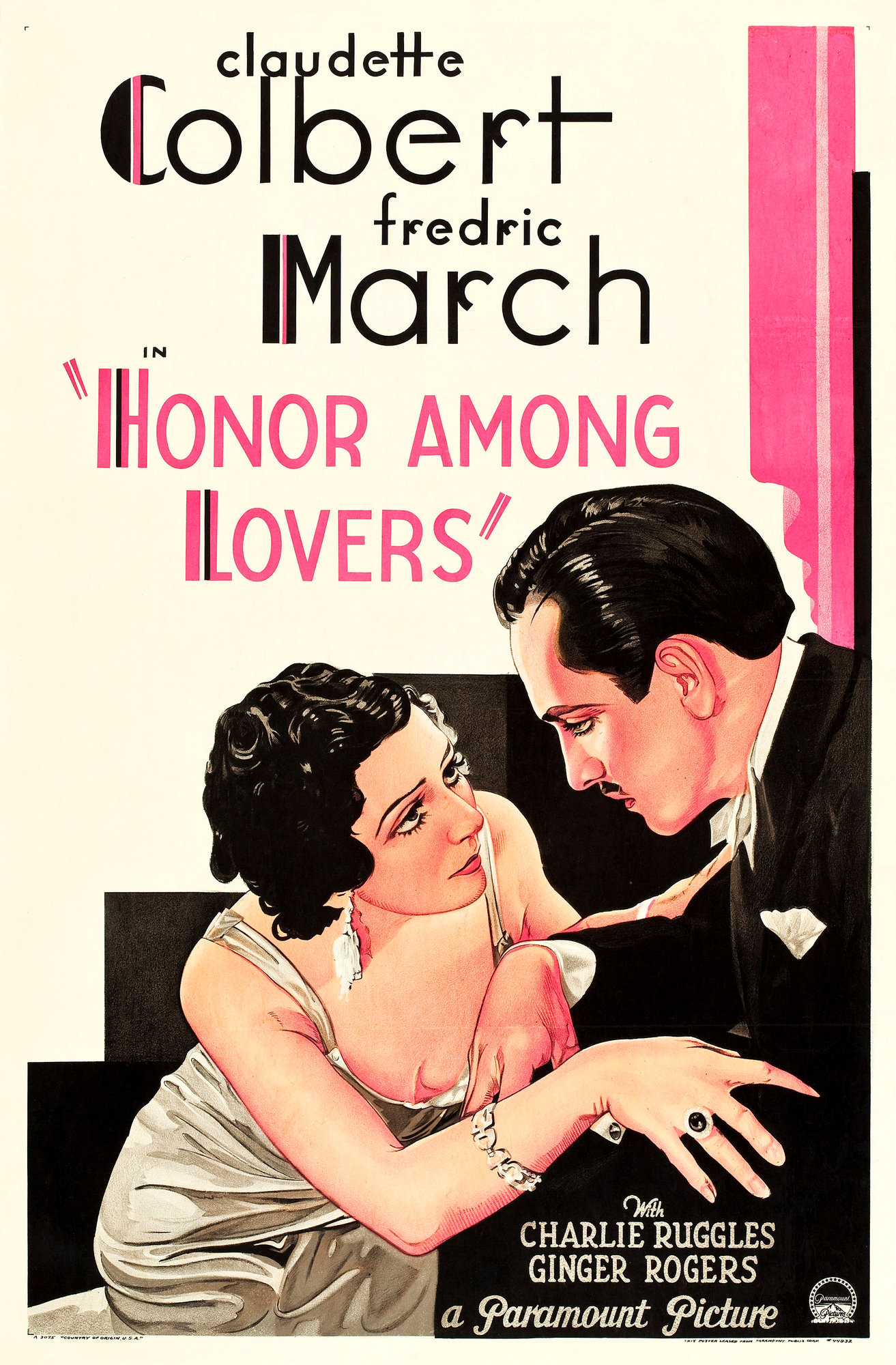
- Directed by: Dorothy Arzner
- Written by: Austin Parker (also story); Gertrude Purcell
- Starring: Claudette Colbert; Fredric March; Monroe Owsley; Charles Ruggles; Ginger Rogers
- Cinematography: George J. Folsey
- Edited by: Helene Turner
- Music by: Vernon Duke; Johnny Green
- Production company: Paramount Pictures
- Distributed by: Paramount Pictures
- Release date: March 21, 1931
- Running time: 75 minutes
- Country: United States
- Language: English

Honor Among Lovers is a 1931 American pre-Code drama film made by Paramount Pictures, directed by Dorothy Arzner. The film stars Claudette Colbert, Fredric March, Monroe Owsley, Charles Ruggles and Ginger Rogers. The film was originally titled Sex in Business.

== Plot ==
Julia Traynor is a highly efficient personal secretary, managing nearly everything for her boss, Wall Street trader Jerry Stafford. Julia's fiancé Philip Craig works in Wall Street as well but is much less successful than Jerry. Monty Dunn a socialite, heavy drinker and a friend of Jerry, is linked with Doris Brown. Jerry wants to be more than Julia's boss, but she loves Philip. Jerry makes persistent attempts to woo Julia but she repeatedly rebuffs his advances. Jerry, Monty, Julia and Philip bump into each other at a restaurant where Philip and Julia have been discussing their marriage. After Jerry persists in pursuing her, Julia decides to marry Philip and they arrange to have the ceremony on the following Monday. Jerry makes another attempt to persuade Julia to marry him but when she says that she has just married Philip, Jerry fires her.

Philip and Julia move into her apartment and she persuades him to be patient and wait to be able move into a better place as they will have to manage on his income alone for now.

Jerry regrets his actions and tries to make up for them by offering Philip some work to handle Jerry's investments. Philip has ambition and feels that he now has the means to give Julia a better living standard. Philip persuades Monty (another rich man) to invest in silk even after they have both been warned against it by Jerry.

A year later, Julia invites Jerry to her first anniversary party in her and Philip's up-market apartment. Jerry immediately falls for her again and kisses her. Monty tells Philip that their investment in silk has failed; Philip makes a scene, and admits to Julia that he'd been embezzling money from Jerry and other investors. Julia asks Jerry for money to keep Philip out of jail, which he provides, but after an angry row in which Philip accuses Julia of selling herself for the money, she leaves him. Philip goes to Jerry's home, expecting to find Julia there; when he doesn't, he tries to leave but trips and shoots Jerry. Jerry tells Philip to give him the gun and leave. Julia is apprehended by police on the train to Washington, D.C. Philip tells them that Julia shot Jerry.

When Julia and Philip are alone, Philip confesses to Julia, and his confession is recorded by the police. However, Jerry states in his testimony that the shooting was accidental, and Philip is acquitted. When he and Julia arrive home, she has already packed her things, having decided to leave him. Jerry arrives to help Julia, and they leave together, talking about taking a trip to France.

== Cast ==
- Claudette Colbert as Julia Traynor
- Fredric March as Jerry Stafford
- Monroe Owsley as Philip Craig
- Charles Ruggles as Monty Dunn
- Ginger Rogers as Doris Brown
- Avonne Taylor as Maybelle Worthington
- Pat J. O'Brien as Conroy
- Janet McLeary as Margaret Newton
- Ralph Morgan as Riggs
- Leonard Carey as Forbes, Butler
- Winifred Harris as Party Guest
- Charles Halton as Wilkes
- Granville Bates as Clark
- Charles Trowbridge as Cunningham (uncredited)

== Production ==
Ginger Rogers was cast after director Dorothy Arzner saw her performance in George and Ira Gershwin's Broadway musical Girl Crazy.

== See also ==
- Ten Cents a Dance
