= The Gun Smugglers =

1912 film by George Melford

- Produced by: Kalem Company
- Starring: Carlyle Blackwell; Alice Joyce
- Distributed by: General Film Company
- Release date: June 12, 1912
- Running time: 1 reel
- Country: United States
- Language: Silent..English titles

The Gun Smugglers is a 1912 American silent romantic short film produced by the Kalem Company and released by General Film Company. It starred Carlyle Blackwell and Alice Joyce.

It survives in the Library of Congress collection and a copy exists at the National Film and Television Museum London.

== Cast ==
- Carlyle Blackwell – Logan Jarrow, The Smuggler's Son
- Alice Joyce – Senorita Valdez
- C. Rhys Price – Steven Jarrow, The Smuggler
