= The Cub Reporter's Temptation =

1913 film

The Cub Reporter's Temptation is a 1913 American short silent film drama. The film starred Earle Foxe and Alice Joyce and Tom Moore in the lead roles.

== Cast ==
- Tom Moore as Spider
- Alice Joyce as Alice Collins
- Earle Foxe as Bud Collins
- Matt Snyder (as Matt B. Snyder)
- Charles M. King as City Editor
- Richard Purdon as Mr. Newcombe
