= The Pursuit of the Smugglers =

1913 film directed by J. P. McGowan

- Directed by: J. P. McGowan
- Starring: Earle Foxe; Irene Boyle; Stuart Holmes; James Vincent
- Production company: Kalem Company
- Distributed by: Kalem Company
- Release date: April 9, 1913
- Running time: 1000 feet
- Country: United States
- Language: Silent

The Pursuit of the Smugglers is a 1913 American short silent film drama. The film was directed by J. P. McGowan and stars Earle Foxe, James Vincent, Irene Boyle, and Stuart Holmes in the lead roles. It was produced and distributed by the Kalem Company.

== Plot ==
James Peyton, a young Internal Revenue Officer of unusual resource, is sent to investigate the operations of a band of daring liquor smugglers and bring about their apprehension. In order that he may not arouse suspicion, Peyton secures employment at a village store, and while engaged in his duties as clerk he gains the friendship of Marcella, the storekeeper's daughter. But in forming the acquaintance, Peyton makes an enemy in Poole, a rough character, who has been endeavoring to win Marcella's hand. Poole is the leader of the smugglers and his association soon becomes known to the vigilant officer. One day, while delivering a basket of groceries, Peyton encounters the smugglers and is made prisoner. He is bound and led to an attic room. Struggling desperately with his bonds, Peyton manages to secure a small pocket mirror from his pocket and flashes a heliograph message to the revenue cutter down the bay. Meanwhile, Marcella, who has been expecting Peyton to call, becomes alarmed at his absence, knowing that he has recently had an altercation with Poole. She warns her cousin, Ben, and by making inquiry, they learn where the officer was seen last. Peyton is discovered in the attic window by Ben, who climbs the porch and assists the officer to escape. Hearing the disturbance, the smugglers take to flight and when the cutter comes steaming up the river in response to Peyton's message, the officer, together with Marcella and Ben, is taken aboard. There is an exciting pursuit, in which the smugglers in a tugboat cast out a net and entangle the propeller of the cutter, but the lawbreakers are finally captured and Peyton receives two rewards.

Moving Picture World (1913)

== Cast ==
- Earle Foxe - James Peyton
- Irene Boyle - Marcella
- Stuart Holmes - Poole
- James Vincent - Ben
