= The Face at the Window (1913 film) =

1913 film

- Produced by: Kalem Company
- Starring: Earle Foxe; Irene Boyle; Stuart Holmes
- Release date: March 26, 1913
- Running time: Short (1,000 feet)
- Country: United States
- Languages: Silent film English intertitles

The Face at the Window is a 1913 American short silent film drama produced by the Kalem Company. The film starred Earle Foxe, Irene Boyle and Stuart Holmes in the lead roles.

== Plot ==
As described in a 1913 blurb: "The foreman of the sawmill misconstrues the disappearance of his ward who has taken drastic measures to protect her guardian's interests. A startling incident reveals the girl's motive."

== Reception ==
Moving Picture World described the "first few scenes as a bit wearisome, because it cannot be seen that they are aiming at any particular story, but toward the end it does present a definite situation that holds. ... We didn't expect to see the girl take that dive into the river after the villainous thief, and it gave us a thrill, and there are one or two other good things in the picture." The review complimented the film for "some pretty backgrounds, but mostly they are out of focus."

== Cast ==
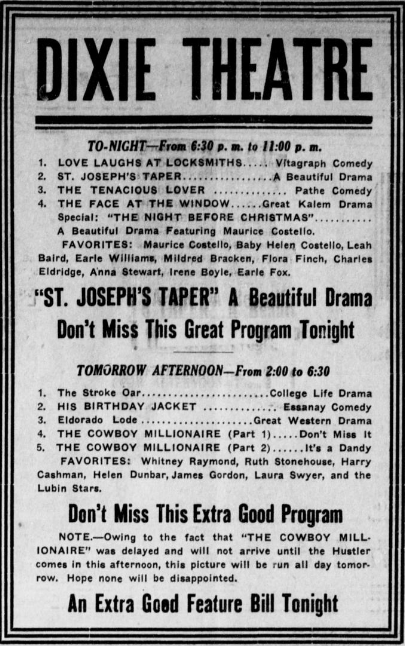
The Face at the Window was among the offerings at the Dixie Theatre in Bryan, Texas for March 28, 1913.

- Earle Foxe as Harold
- Irene Boyle as Ruth
- James Ross as Edward (mill owner)
- Stuart Holmes as the thief
