= Dr. Jekyll and Mr. Hyde (1913 film) =

- Directed by: Herbert Brenon
- Screenplay by: Herbert Brenon
- Based on: Strange Case of Dr. Jekyll and Mr. Hyde; 1886 novella by Robert Louis Stevenson
- Produced by: Carl Laemmle
- Starring: King Baggot; Jane Gail; Matt B. Snyder; Howard Crampton
- Production company: IMP Independent Moving Pictures Co. of America
- Distributed by: The Universal Film Manufacturing Company, Incorporated
- Release date: 1913
- Running time: Two reels (26 minutes)
- Country: United States

Dr. Jekyll and Mr. Hyde is a 1913 silent horror film based on Robert Louis Stevenson's 1886 gothic novella Strange Case of Dr. Jekyll and Mr. Hyde. Directed by Herbert Brenon for producer Carl Laemmle's company IMP (which he later changed to Universal Pictures), the production stars King Baggot in the dual role of Jekyll and Hyde. The film was re-released in the United States in August 1927.

== Plot ==
Dr. Henry Jekyll sends a note to his fiancée, Alice, and her father to say that instead of accompanying them to the opera, he must give more time to his charity patients. At Jekyll's practice, his friends Dr. Lanyon and Utterson, a lawyer, ridicule him for what they consider his dangerous research. Alice and her father also visit Jekyll's rooms, but although apologetic, the doctor insists on devoting his time to his patients. That night, however, Jekyll undertakes a dangerous experiment, swallowing a drug intended to release his evil self. His body convulses, and he transforms into a hunched, twisted figure.

The strange creature emerges from Jekyll's room, bearing a note in Jekyll's handwriting that orders the household staff to treat the stranger – “Mr Hyde” – as himself. Hyde then slips out into the night, terrorizing the patrons of a nearby tavern before finding himself lodgings. From these rooms, he begins a career of evil, until one night he attacks and injures a crippled child. Outraged witnesses corner Hyde and force him to agree to compensate the boy. Hyde reluctantly leads one man back to Jekyll's house and gives him money. During this passage of events, a worried Dr. Utterson sees Hyde entering Jekyll's house. Inside, Hyde takes a potion that transforms him back to Jekyll. The doctor swears that he will abandon his experiments and never tempt fate again; but that night, without taking the drug, he turns spontaneously into Hyde.

Part two of the film sees Jekyll prepare his will in which he states that should he die or disappear, all of his worldly possessions should revert to Mr. Hyde.

Alice visits Jekyll and, during her visit, Jekyll appears to be suffering from pain in his chest. Alice leaves to find help, and Jekyll transforms into Hyde again.

Outside, Alice pleads with Lanyon and Utterson for help. Looking up at Jekyll's window, they are dismayed to see Hyde. While discussing what to do, Hyde prepares another drug after which the trio outside see Jekyll in the window. They turn away and leave, as Jekyll despairs, collapsing at his desk.

Alice meets Jekyll once more while walking with Utterson. When Jekyll appears to suffer a headache, Alice goes inside the house to seek help. Meanwhile, Jekyll becomes Hyde yet again and this time attacks Alice's father. A search is made but Hyde cannot be found.

A boy encounters Hyde who gives him a message to deliver to Lanyon. In it, Jekyll pleads for Lanyon to bring him the boxes from his desk, to be delivered to Jekyll's messenger at midnight.

Lanyon brings the boxes to Hyde, who concocts and consumes the antidote and thus reveals to Lanyon that Hyde and Jekyll are one and the same.

Some time later, we see Hyde has run out of the antidote and although he sends his servants throughout London seeking the ingredients, they are unable to do so before Hyde perishes. In the end, Jekyll is surrounded by his friends as Alice weeps over him.

== Cast ==
- King Baggot as Dr. Henry Jekyll/Mr. Hyde
- Jane Gail as Alice, Dr. Jekyll's fiancé
- Matt B. Snyder as Alice's father
- Howard Crampton as Dr. Lanyon
- William Sorelle as Utterson, the attorney
- Herbert Brenon

== Critique ==
Like so many other performers of this period, it was standard practice for the actors to apply their own make-up. While assuming the dual role of Jekyll and Hyde, King Baggot employed a variety of different greasepaints and a tangled mass of crepe hair. Through the use of camera dissolves, Baggot was able to achieve the transformation. Critic Troy Howarth felt that "it gave him the chance to play a difficult dual role, but his performance has not aged well....his hunched over walk comes across as forced and ridiculous...evoking comparisons with Jerry Lewis'....performance as The Nutty Professor....with his unruly hair and prominent buckteeth".

The film used a slow dissolve effect to show the transformation, as opposed to a quick matching cut, and the critics were impressed, George Blaisdell of Moving Picture World commenting "It is through the means of the dissolving process that the transformation is made peculiarly effective...You see the change of the man of good to the man of evil right before your eyes".

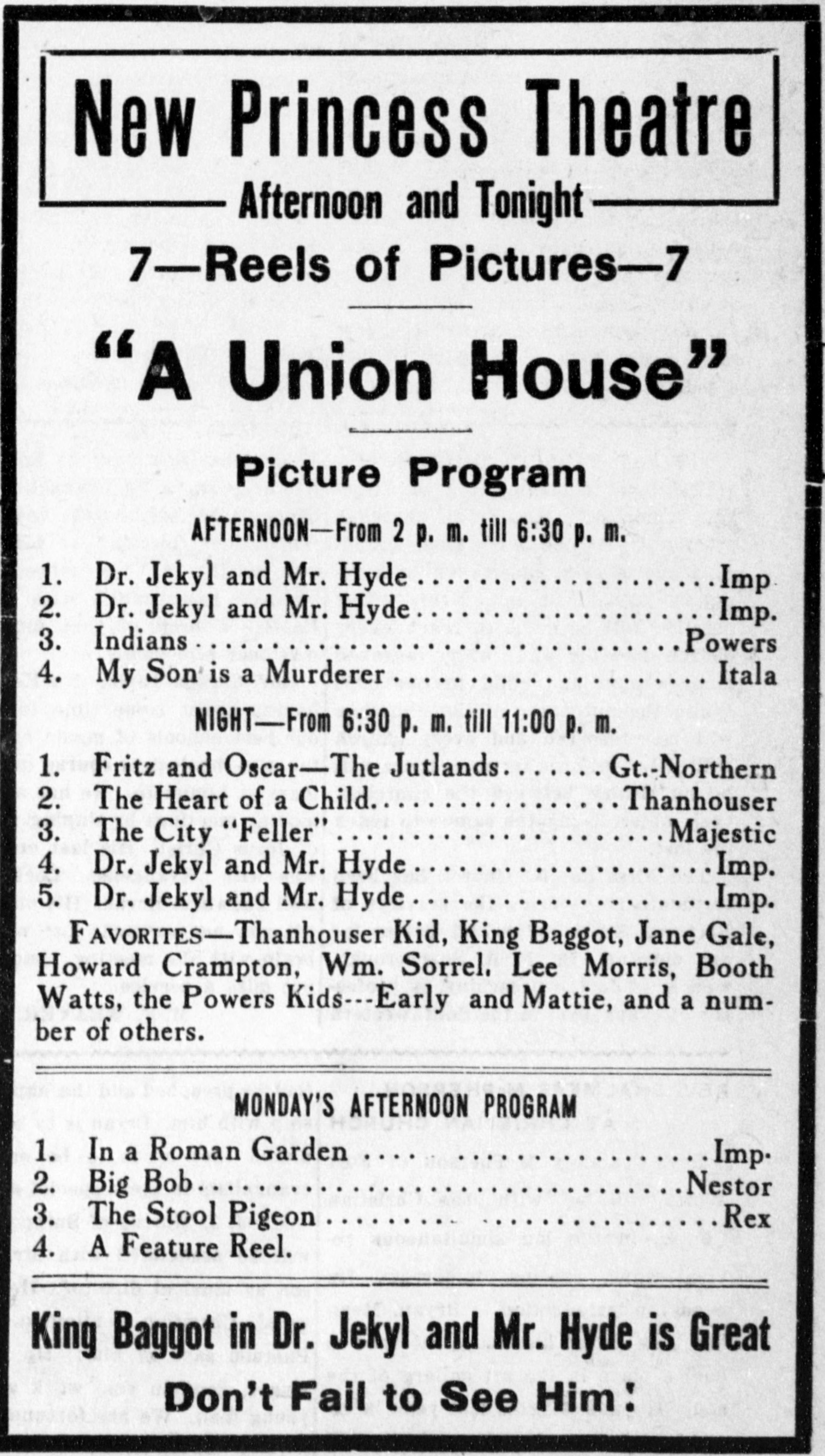
Texas newspaper schedule of local theatre's films, including Dr. Jekyll and Mr. Hyde
