= Dainty Marie =

American vaudeville and circus performer

Marie Meeker
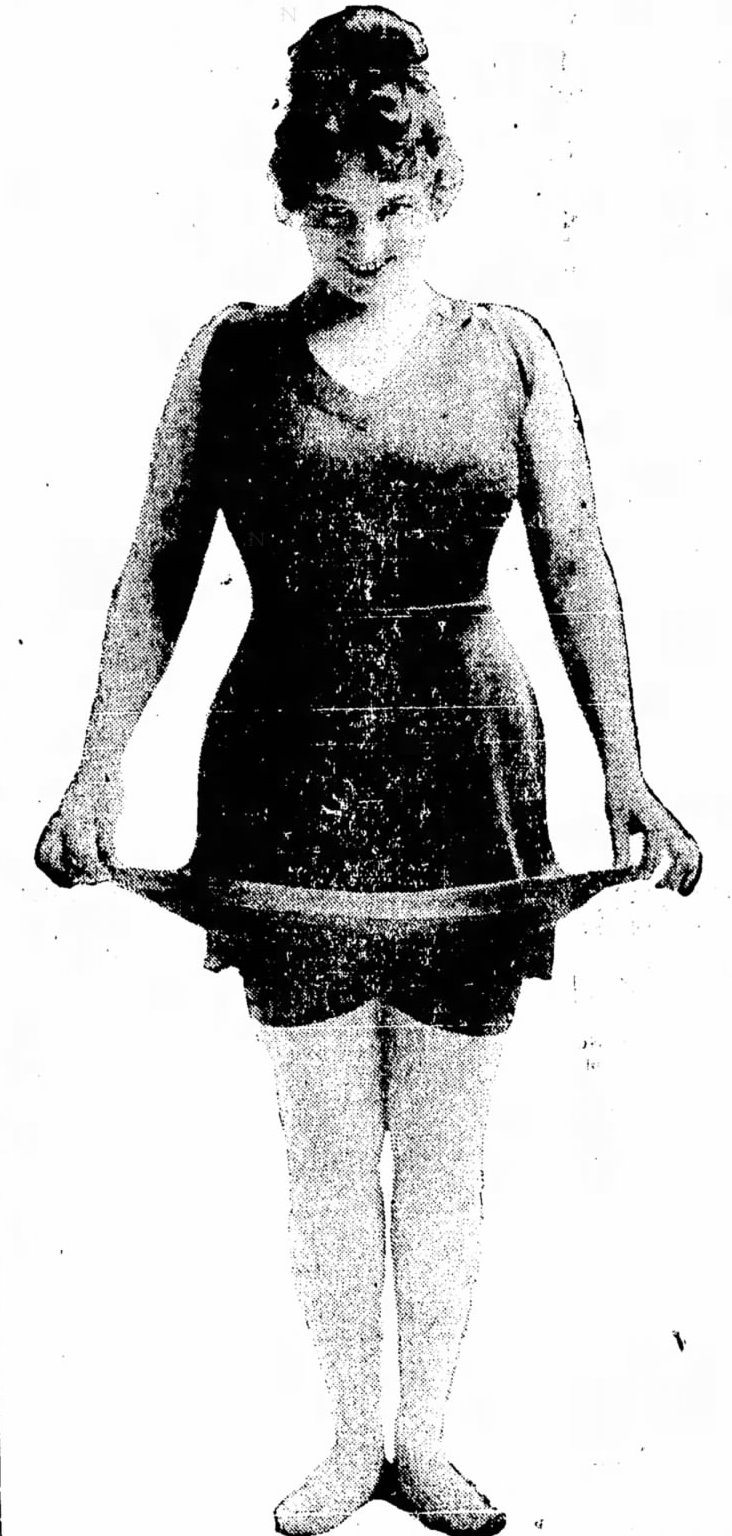
- Newspaper image, 1917
- Born: Maybelle Meeker; November 6, 1886; Leavenworth, Kansas, U.S.
- Died: April 2, 1960 (aged 73); Saugus, California, U.S.
- Other name: Dainty Marie
- Occupation: Vaudeville performer

Marie Meeker (born Maybelle Meeker; November 6, 1886 – April 2, 1960), who performed under the name Dainty Marie, was an American vaudeville and circus performer.

== Life and career ==
She was born in Leavenworth, Kansas, the daughter of a prison guard, and niece of pioneer Ezra Meeker. She was apprenticed to a small circus as a child, and learned such skills as bareback riding, rope spinning, and aerial acrobatics.

She rose to fame quickly in the early 1900s, and appeared in Broadway shows with Blanche Ring, Lew Fields, and Julian Eltinge. She became a headline performer in vaudeville, with an act in which she first sang in an evening gown, or period costume, and then disrobed to perform acrobatic feats on a trapeze while clad in a leotard and tights. She also performed living recreations of statues by Rodin. In her youth she was noted for her attractive figure, and also became known for her physical strength after an altercation with some "mashers" while she was walking on Broadway. A follower of Christian Science, she promoted the values of exercise and moral reform.

She became a featured performer with Ringling Bros. and Barnum & Bailey Circus, where she was billed as "the world's greatest aerialist". She later returned to vaudeville. In 1923, her act was described as "in a class by itself as a vaudeville novelty that Is different".

She retired in 1931 in order to start a physical culture school for women in Milwaukee. In about 1948 she moved to Saugus, California, where she died in 1960 at the age of 73.

She was married four times. She had brief marriages, ending in divorce, to Ewald "Wally" Hupel in 1903; to actor Earle Foxe in 1914; and to Clarence Williams in 1928. Her final marriage was to Walter Hickey, who predeceased her.
