= A Woman's Way (1916 film) =

1916 silent film

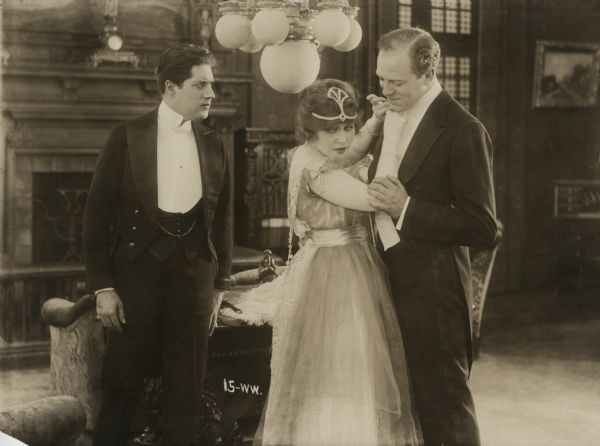
- Film still (from left) Carlyle Blackwell, Ethel Clayton, and Montagu Love
- Directed by: Barry O'Neil
- Written by: Thompson Buchanan; Frances Marion
- Produced by: William A. Brady
- Starring: Ethel Clayton; Carlyle Blackwell; Alec B. Francis
- Cinematography: Max Schneider
- Production company: Peerless Productions
- Distributed by: World Film
- Release date: August 7, 1916
- Running time: 50 minutes
- Country: United States
- Languages: Silent; English intertitles

A Woman's Way is a 1916 American silent drama film directed by Barry O'Neil and starring Ethel Clayton, Carlyle Blackwell and Alec B. Francis.

== Cast ==
- Ethel Clayton as Marion Livingston
- Carlyle Blackwell as Howard Stanton
- Alec B. Francis as General John Stanton
- Pierre LeMay as Jack Stanton
- Edward Kimball as John Livingston
- Montagu Love as Oliver Whitney
- Edith Campbell as Nina Blakemore

== Bibliography ==
- Cari Beauchamp. Without Lying Down: Frances Marion and the Powerful Women of Early Hollywood. University of California Press, 1998.
