= The Game Warden =

- Starring: Earle Foxe; Irene Boyle; Stuart Holmes
- Distributed by: Kalem Company
- Release date: February 14, 1913
- Country: United States
- Languages: Silent film English

The Game Warden is a 1913 American short silent film romantic comedy. The film starred Earle Foxe, Irene Boyle, and Stuart Holmes.
