= Earle Foxe =

American actor (1891–1973)

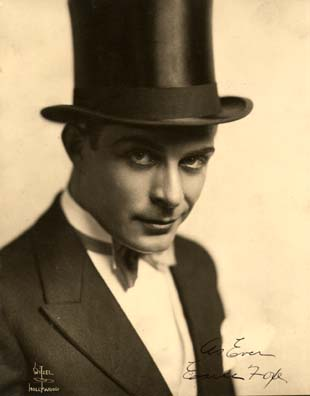
- Foxe in 1914
- Born: December 25, 1891; Oxford, Ohio, U.S.
- Died: December 10, 1973 (aged 81); Los Angeles, California, U.S.
- Other name: Earl Foxe
- Occupation: Actor
- Years active: 1912–1946
- Spouse: Gladys Elizabeth Borum Tenison (m. 1925)

Earle Foxe (born Earl Aldrich Fox; December 25, 1891 – December 10, 1973) was an American actor.

== Early years ==
Foxe was born in Oxford, Ohio, to Charles Aldrich Fox, originally of Flint, Michigan, and Eva May Herron. He was educated at Ohio State University, where he participated in theatrical productions.

== Career ==
Foxe left for New York City as a young man and became a stage actor, working for two years as the Garrick Stock Company's leading man. He performed on stage with Douglas Fairbanks before going into films. On Broadway, he performed in Dancing Around (1915), Come Seven (1920), and Princess Virtue (1921).

He appeared in some films in New York City and lived at the Lambs Club in the early 1920s at 130 West 44th Street in New York City but moved to California in 1922 and signed a contract with Fox Film Corporation.

Foxe became the first president of the Black-Foxe Military Institute, a military school for boys in Hollywood, in 1928 and served in that office until 1960. He continued to regularly appear in movies until 1937, with two minor appearances thereafter.

== Personal life and death ==
Foxe married vaudeville star Maybelle Meeker, aka "Dainty Marie", on August 7, 1914, in Leavenworth, Kansas. The marriage effectively lasted about four months, but was not legally dissolved for a year.

== Selected filmography ==
=== 1910s ===
Year	Title	Role
1912	The Street Singer	Karl
1912	The County Fair	John - Mary's Sweetheart
1912	The Young Millionaire	John Curtis - Sarah's Father
1912	The Tell-Tale Message	Robert Boardman - The Detective / James Ruthven - The Banker's Valet
1912	A Battle of Wits	Frank Anderson
1912	All for a Girl	Billy Joy, a Reporter (as Mr. Fox)
1912	A Business Buccaneer	Hastings - Manager of the Rival Company
1913	A Sawmill Hazard	Roland Hurton
1913	A Desperate Chance	Tom Hoover - a Freight Conductor
1913	The Cub Reporter's Temptation	Bud Collins - a Cub Reporter
1913	The Game Warden	Heck Thompson - a Mountaineer
1913	The Fire Coward	Jim Houston - a Revenue Officer
1913	The Face at the Window	Harold - the Foreman's Nephew
1913	The Pursuit of the Smugglers	James Peyton - an Internal Revenue Officer
1913	The Scimitar of the Prophet	Harris - a Tourist
1913	The Spender	Bobby Lang
1913	His Wife's Child	Fox - the Dissolute
1913	Unto the Third Generation	
1914	The Green-Eyed Devil	
1914	The Old Man	
1914	The Floor Above	Bartlett
1914	Home, Sweet Home	
1914	The Girl in the Shack	Jim - the Bandit
1914	The Lover's Gift	James Dayton
1914	The Swindlers	Roy Walton
1914	The Escape	Minor Role (uncredited)
1914	The Rose Bush of Memories	Ogilvie - the Husband
1914	To Be Called For	Otis Perkins
1914	His Father's Rifle	
1914	The Livid Flame	James McNair
1914	Rosemary, That's for Remembrance	Harvey Greerson
1914	Out of Petticoat Lane	
1914	The Amateur Detective	
1914	The Combination of the Safe	The Diamond Thief
1915	Celeste	Harry Wallace - the Millionaire's Son
1915	The Eternal Feminine	Charles Philips
1915	The Tiger Slayer	Frank Holden
1915	The Lost Messenger	Charles Clancy
1915	Locked In	Henry Blaisdell - Telegrapher
1916	Diamonds Are Trumps	Tom Roach
1916	The Trail of the Lonesome Pine	Dave Tolliver
1916	The Black Orchid	Lt. Jack Peters
1916	Unto Those Who Sin	Ashton
1916	The Love Mask	Silver Spurs
1916	Alien Souls	Aleck Lindsay
1916	The Dream Girl	Tom Merton
1916	Public Opinion	Dr. Henry Morgan
1916	Ashes of Embers	Richard Leigh
1917	Panthea	Gerald Mordaunt
1917	Blind Man's Luck	Boby Guerton
1917	The Fatal Ring	Nicholas Knox
1917	Outwitted	Billy Bond
1917	The Honeymoon	Richard Greer
1918	The Studio Girl	Frazer Ordway
1918	From Two to Six	Howard Skeele
1918	Peck's Bad Girl	Dick

=== 1920s ===
Year	Title	Role
1921	The Black Panther's Cub	Lord Maudsley
1922	The Prodigal Judge	Bruce Carrington
1922	The Man She Brought Back	John Ramsey
1923	Vanity Fair	Captain Dobbin
1923	The French Doll	Minor Role (uncredited)
1923	Innocence	Paul Atkins
1923	Fashion Row	James Morton
1924	A Lady of Quality	Sir John Ozen
1924	The Fight	Reginald Van Bibber
1924	The Hunt	Reginald Van Bibber
1924	Oh, You Tony!	Jim Overton
1924	The Race	Reginald Van Bibber
1924	The Last Man on Earth	Elmer Smith
1924	Paul Jones Jr.	Reginald Van Bibber
1924	The Burglar	Reginald Van Bibber
1925	The Guest of Honor	Reginald Van Bibber
1925	A Spanish Romeo	Reginald Van Bibber
1925	The Sky Jumper	Reginald Van Bibber
1925	The Wrestler	Reginald Van Bibber
1925	Wages for Wives	Hughie Logan
1925	A Parisian Knight	Reginald Van Bibber
1926	The Feud	Reginald Van Bibber
1926	The Reporter	Reginald Van Bibber
1926	The Mad Racer	Reginald Van Bibber
1926	A Trip to Chinatown	Welland Strong
1926	Rah! Rah! Heidelberg!	Reginald Van Bibber
1926	The Swimming Instructor	Reginald Van Bibber
1926	King Bozo	Reginald Van Bibber
1926	The Tennis Wizard	Reginald Van Bibber
1927	Motor Boat Demon	Reginald Van Bibber
1927	Upstream	Eric Brasingham
1927	Society Architect	Reginald Van Bibber
1927	Car Shy	Reginald Van Bibber
1927	Not the Type	Reginald Van Bibber
1927	Slaves of Beauty	Paul Perry
1927	A Hot Potato	Reginald Van Bibber
1927	Ladies Must Dress	George Ward Jr
1928	Sailors' Wives	Max Slater
1928	Four Sons	Maj. von Stomm
1928	Hangman's House	John D'Arcy
1928	News Parade	Ivan Vodkoff - Mysterious Stranger
1928	None but the Brave	
1928	The River Pirate	Shark
1928	Blindfold	Dr. Cornelius Simmons
1929	Fugitives	Al Barrow
1929	New Year's Eve	Barry Harmon
1929	The Ghost Talks	Heimie Heimrath
1929	Thru Different Eyes	Howard Thornton
1929	Black Magic	Hugh Darrell

=== 1930s ===
Year	Title	Role
1930	Good Intentions	'Flash' Norton
1931	Dance, Fools, Dance	Wally Baxter (as Earl Foxe)
1931	Transatlantic	Handsome
1931	The Spider	John Carrington
1931	Ladies of the Big House	Kid Athens
1931	The Wide Open Spaces	Townsman
1932	Union Depot	Detective Jim Parker, G-Man
1932	The Expert	Fred Minick
1932	Strangers in Love	J.C. Clark
1932	The Midnight Patrol	Judson
1932	Destry Rides Again	Brent
1932	So Big!	Pervus De Jong
1932	They Never Come Back	Jerry Filmore
1932	The Engineer's Daughter	William Brawney
1932	A Passport to Hell	Purser
1932	Two Lips and Juleps	Stanway Stone
1932	Those We Love	Bert Parker
1932	The All-American	Read
1932	Scarlet Dawn	Boris, a soldier (uncredited)
1932	Men Are Such Fools	Joe Darrow
1933	Blondie Johnson	Scannel
1933	The Mind Reader	Don Holman
1933	A Bedtime Story	Max de l'Enclos
1933	Arizona to Broadway	John Sandburg
1934	The Big Shakedown	Carey (uncredited)
1934	Bedside	Joe
1934	Missouri Nightingale	Harry Crandall
1934	Little Man, What Now?	Frenchman
1934	You Belong to Me	(uncredited)
1934	Counsel on De Fence	Travers, Tony's Attorney
1934	Love Time	Sergeant
1934	Bright Eyes	Bond Man (uncredited)
1935	The Informer	British Officer (uncredited)
1936	Brilliant Marriage	Reporter
1936	The Golden Arrow	Alfred 'Pat' Parker
1936	Mary of Scotland	Earl of Kent
1936	Fifteen Maiden Lane	Society Crook (uncredited)
1936	Crack-Up	Operative #30
1937	The Mighty Treve	Judson (as Earle Fox)
1937	We're on the Jury	Mr. Thomas Jeffreys
1937	Murder Goes to College	Tom Barry
1937	Dangerously Yours	Eddie
1937	Lady Behave!	(uncredited)

=== 1940s ===
Year	Title	Role
1940	Military Academy	Maj. Dover
1946	My Darling Clementine	Gambler (uncredited) (final film role)
