= White Man (film) =

1924 film by Louis J. Gasnier

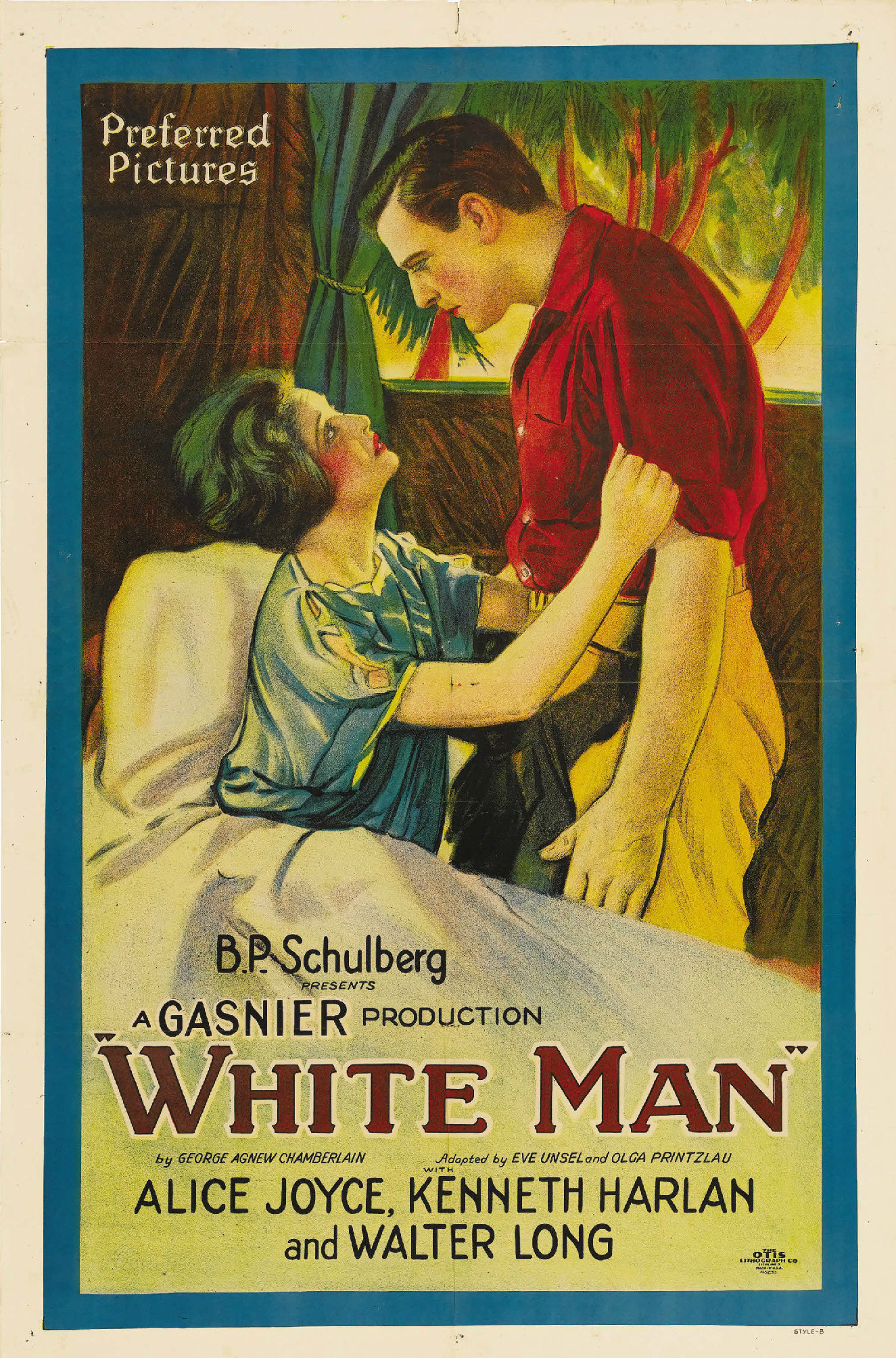
- Film poster
- Directed by: Louis J. Gasnier
- Written by: George Agnew Chamberlain (story); Olga Printzlau
- Produced by: B.P. Schulberg
- Starring: Kenneth Harlan; Alice Joyce
- Cinematography: Karl Struss
- Production company: B. P. Schulberg Productions
- Distributed by: Al Lichtman Corporation / Preferred Pictures
- Release date: November 1, 1924
- Running time: 70 minutes
- Country: United States
- Language: Silent (English intertitles)

White Man is a lost 1924 American silent drama film directed by Louis J. Gasnier and is set in a diamond mine in South Africa. It was Clark Gable's film debut.

== Plot ==
As described in a review in a film magazine, about to be married to a wealthy South African mine owner whom she does not love, Lady Andrea Pellor rebels after she gets her bridal gown on, and seeing an airplane on the beach begs the aviator to take her away. He consents and takes her to his home in the jungle, where she is forced to stay, as the henchmen of his enemy the River Pirate have splintered the propeller and it takes weeks to send for a new one. The hero is a disappointed, disillusioned man seeking to forget and is only known as White Man. He respects her but treats her with a touch of brutality. Lady Andrea contracts jungle fever and he nurses her back to health, and they love each other but her training makes her hide it. The River Pirate pays them a visit and after a fight kidnaps Lady Andrea. White Man goes in his airplane, crashes through the roof of the house and rescues her. He then takes her back to civilization. He follows and turns out to be her brother’s war buddy. Finally she confesses her love as he is about to return to the jungle.

== Cast ==
- Kenneth Harlan as White Man
- Alice Joyce as Lady Andrea Pellor
- Walter Long as The River Thief
- Clark Gable as Lady Andrea's Brother
- Stanton Heck as Mark Hammer

== See also ==
- List of lost films
