= Avonne Taylor =

American showgirl and actress (1899–1992)

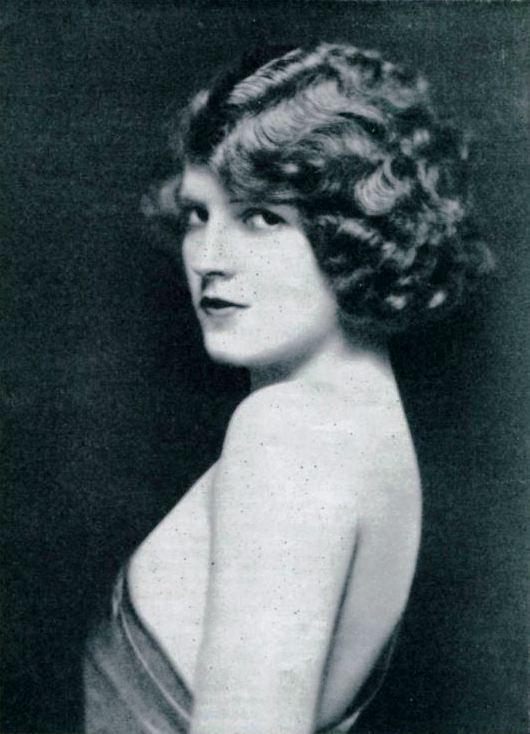
- Taylor in 1922
- Born: Evangeline Taylor; February 12, 1899; Springfield, Ohio, U.S.
- Died: March 20, 1992 (aged 93); Chagrin Falls, Ohio, U.S.
- Occupations: Actress, showgirl
- Years active: 1920–1931
- Spouses: Leslie B. Rosecrans (m. 1917; div. 1920) Louis Gess (m. 1925; div. 1928) Thomas F. Manville Jr. (m. 1931; div. 1931) Carlyle Blackwell (m. 1933; div. 1936): George Robb (m. 19??; died 1986)
- Children: 1

Avonne Taylor (born Evangeline Taylor; February 12, 1899 – March 20, 1992) was an American showgirl and actress.

== Early years ==
Avonne Taylor was born Evangeline Taylor in Springfield, Ohio, the daughter of Clifford and Diane Howe Taylor. She and her family moved to Cleveland, Ohio, in 1913. She went to New York soon after World War I, seeking success in entertainment. The day after she had an interview with Florenz Ziegfeld she began appearing in his Midnight Frolic production.

== Career ==
Taylor appeared in the 1920, 1921, and 1922 versions of the Ziegfeld Follies and in Ziegfeld Midnight Frolic [1920]. She was designated the most beautiful of the 85 showgirls in the 1922 Follies, and the Prince of Wales considered her the most beautiful girl he had seen on a stage. In 1923, Taylor was the model for advertising for Yeast Foam Tablets. Text of the newspaper ad quoted Florenz Ziegfeld as saying, "I believe Miss Avonne Taylor, of the Follies, is the most perfect type of the natural girl of 1923." Also in 1923, the San Francisco Chronicle printed a full-page feature article in which Taylor presented tips to help women to look better.

Taylor said in March 1923, "I do not care for the stage." By October 1923 she had left the Follies and joined the Famous Players–Lasky motion picture company. By 1927, Taylor had signed a film contract with Metro-Goldwyn-Mayer. Films in which she appeared included Zaza (1923), After Midnight (1927), My Best Girl (1927), Honor Among Lovers (1931), and Money and Marriage (1931). She stopped working in films in 1931.

== Financial matters ==
In 1923 robbers entered Taylor's apartment by pretending to make a delivery from a florist and robbed her of $50,000 in jewelry. She earned — and lost — $500,000 in the stock market. In July 1940 she filed suit in Springfield to collect $1,489 that she had loaned to an uncle by marriage who died on January 20, 1940. The legal petition said that she loaned the money believing that the uncle was destitute, but when he died she learned that he had $6,072 in a bank account and $990 in a safe-deposit box. The petition said that the uncle's executrix rejected Taylor's claim for the money.

== Personal life and death ==
Taylor's first marriage was in 1917 to Leslie B. Rosecrans, a man whose name she later said that she could not remember. They were divorced around 1920. On July 24, 1925, she married Louis Gess, the Follies' musical director, in Jersey City. The wedding occurred in secret, but word soon spread to the couple's Broadway associates. They were divorced in 1928. She married Thomas F. Manville Jr. on May 21, 1931, in New York City. Taylor and Manville had renewed their old acquaintance in Paris, and they attempted to marry in Europe. However, "discouraged at the demands for certified copies of divorce decrees and other legal documents in Paris and other centers", they came to the United States and were married by a city clerk in a municipal wedding chapel. They were divorced on November 28, 1931. She married actor Carlyle Blackwell on March 25, 1933, in Reno, Nevada. They were divorced in 1936. When she was in her 80s she married George Robb, a longtime friend. That marriage ended with his death in 1986.

Over many years Taylor lived in Europe, New York City, and Palm Springs, California, before she returned to Cleveland in 1989, living with relatives before moving to Hamlet Manor in Chagrin Falls, Ohio. She died there on March 20, 1992, aged 93.
