= Beyond the Cities =

1930 British film by Carlyle Blackwell

- Directed by: Carlyle Blackwell
- Written by: Noel Shannon; Carlyle Blackwell
- Produced by: Carlyle Blackwell
- Starring: Carlyle Blackwell; Edna Best; Alexander Field; Laurence Hanray
- Production company: Piccadilly Films
- Distributed by: Paramount British Pictures
- Release date: 18 September 1930
- Running time: 70 minutes
- Country: United Kingdom
- Language: English

Beyond the Cities (also known as Reparations) is a 1930 British drama film directed by Carlyle Blackwell and starring Blackwell, Edna Best and Alexander Field. The film was made as a quota quickie for release by Paramount Pictures, and is believed to have been made at Twickenham Studios. The film is mainly set in Canada.

== Cast ==
- Carlyle Blackwell as Jim Campbell
- Edna Best as Mary Hayes
- Alexander Field as Sam
- Laurence Hanray as Gregory Hayes
- Helen Haye as Amy Hayes
- Eric Maturin as Hector Braydon
- Percy Parsons as Boss

== Bibliography ==
- Chibnall, Steve. Quota Quickies: The Birth of the British 'B' Film. British Film Institute, 2007.
- Low, Rachael. Filmmaking in 1930s Britain. George Allen & Unwin, 1985.
- Wood, Linda. British Films, 1927–1939. British Film Institute, 1986.
