= The Rolling Road =

1927 film

- Directed by: Graham Cutts
- Written by: Boyd Cable; Violet E. Powell
- Produced by: Michael Balcon; Carlyle Blackwell
- Starring: Carlyle Blackwell; Flora le Breton; Clifford Heatherley
- Production company: Gainsborough Pictures
- Distributed by: Woolf and Freedman
- Release date: 19 September 1927
- Country: United Kingdom
- Languages: Silent; English intertitles

The Rolling Road is a 1927 British silent drama film directed by Graham Cutts and starring Carlyle Blackwell, Flora le Breton, Clifford Heatherley and A.V. Bramble. The screenplay concerns a young woman in a Cornish fishing village who has to choose between various suitors.

It was made at Islington Studios and on location at Porthleven in Cornwall and Great Yarmouth in Norfolk. It premiered in May 1927 and went on general release in September of the same year. Its critical reception was unenthusiastic, with reviewers feeling it was below the standard of Cutts' other work during the era.

== Cast ==
- Carlyle Blackwell as Tom Forty
- Flora le Breton as Nell
- Clifford Heatherley as John Ogilvie
- A.V. Bramble as John Christobel
- Cameron Carr as Mate
- Marie Ault as Grannie
- Mickey Brantford as Nipper
- Benson Kleve as Captain

== Bibliography ==
- Chapman, Gary. London's Hollywood: The Gainsborough Studio in the Silent Years. Edditt, 2014.
- Low, Rachel. The History of British Film: Volume IV, 1918–1929. Routledge, 1997.
