= The Floor Above =

- Directed by: James Kirkwood
- Written by: E. Phillips Oppenheim
- Produced by: D.W. Griffith
- Starring: Henry B. Walthall; Dorothy Gish; Estelle Mardo; Ralph Lewis; Earle Foxe; Caryl S. Fleming
- Distributed by: Continental Feature Film Corporation; Mutual Film Corporation
- Release date: April 1914
- Country: United States
- Languages: Silent film English intertitles

The Floor Above is a 1914 American silent mystery film directed by James Kirkwood. The film stars Earle Foxe, Henry Walthall and Dorothy Gish in the lead roles.

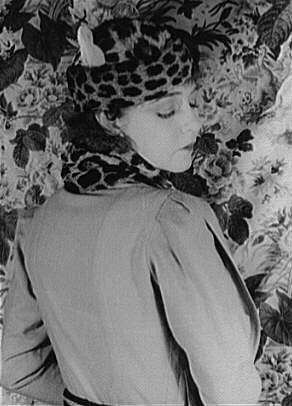
Dorothy Gish in 1932

It is adapted from E. Phillips Oppenheim's story "The Tragedy of Charlecot Mansions" from his 1914 short story collection The Amazing Partnership.

== Cast ==
- Earle Foxe
- Henry B. Walthall as Stephen Pryde
- Dorothy Gish as Stella Ford
- Estelle Mardo (as Estelle Coffin) as Grace Burton
- Ralph Lewis as Jerome

== Reception ==
Variety reviewer Mark wrote that the film "lacks the four-part wallop" and "photographically it's good and all that, but there is little acting and absolutely too much studio stuff to suit the boys and girls who like more outdoor atmosphere to murder subjects."
