= The Combination of the Safe =

- Starring: Earle Foxe; George W. Middleton; Stuart Holmes
- Release date: 1912
- Country: United States
- Languages: Silent film English intertitles

The Combination of the Safe is a 1912 American silent short film. The director is unknown.

It was produced by Kalem Company.

== Cast ==
- Stuart Holmes: The Detective
- Earle Foxe: Atland Harrison(Thief)
- George W. Middleton: Smith Weston (Diamond Importer)
