= Oil and Water (film) =

1913 film

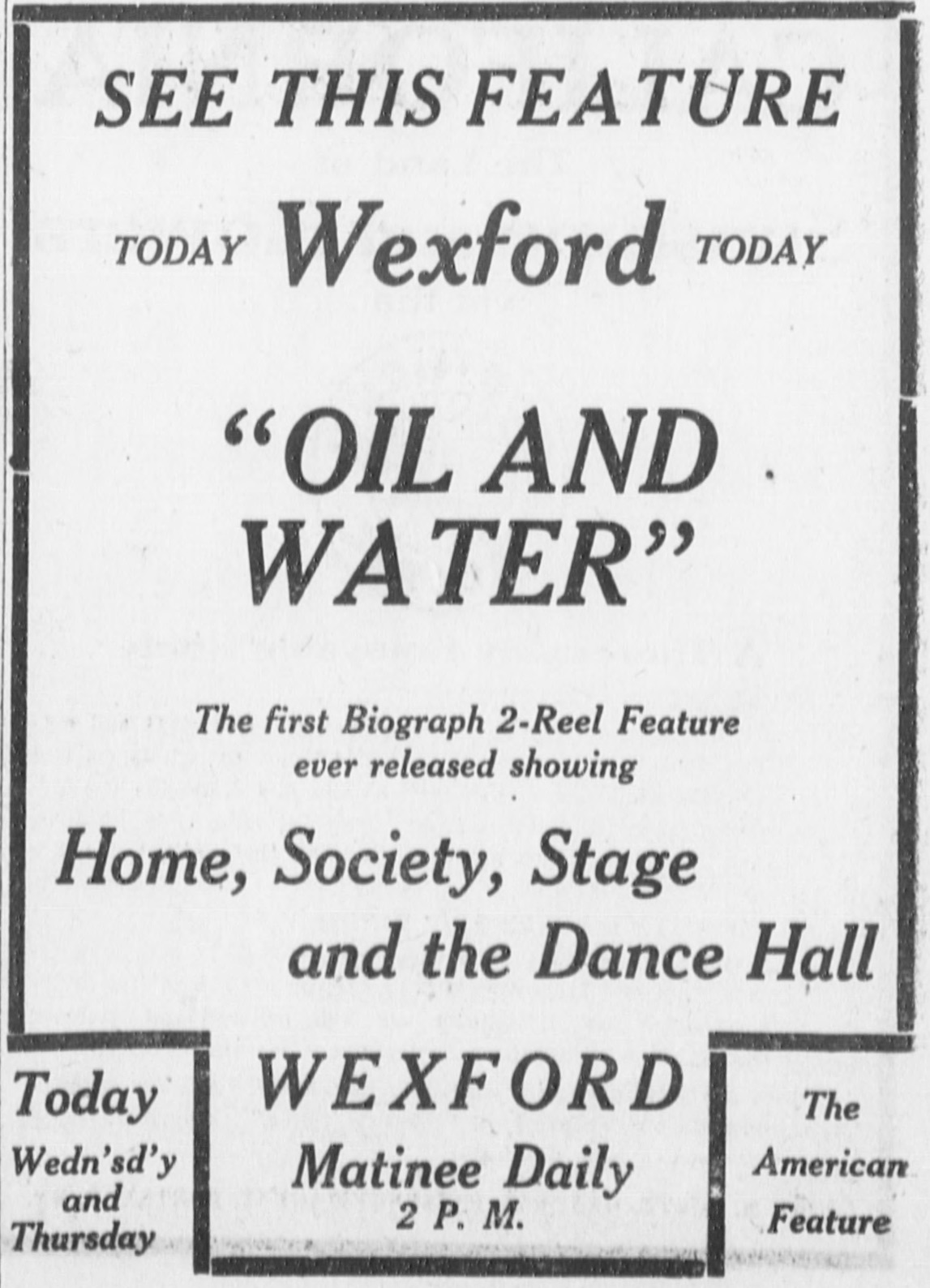
- Newspaper advertisement
- Directed by: D. W. Griffith
- Written by: Edward
- Starring: Blanche Sweet; Henry B. Walthall; Lionel Barrymore; Harry Carey
- Cinematography: G. W. Bitzer
- Distributed by: Biograph Company; General Film Company
- Release date: February 6, 1913
- Running time: 25 minutes
- Country: United States
- Language: Silent (English intertitles)

Oil and Water is a 1913 American silent short film directed by D. W. Griffith and starring Blanche Sweet. The supporting cast includes Henry B. Walthall, Lionel Barrymore, and Harry Carey.

The film was exhibited at the Museum of Modern Art in New York City in July 2007 as part of a Biograph studio retrospective.

== Plot ==
A stage dancer and a serious-type homebody discover, after marriage, that their individual styles don't mesh. The movie includes elaborate dance sequences.

== Cast ==
- Blanche Sweet as Mademoiselle Genova
- Henry B. Walthall as the idealist
- Lionel Barrymore as in first audience / in second audience / visitor
- Walter Miller as the idealist's brother, a minister
- Clara T. Bracy as the nurse
- Harry Carey as stage manager / at dinner
- Gertrude Bambrick as among dancers
- Kathleen Butler as in first audience / among dancers
- William J. Butler as among dancers
- John T. Dillon as in second audience / at dinner
- Frank Evans as in first audience / in second audience
- Dorothy Gish as in first audience
- Lillian Gish as in first audience
- Robert Harron
- J. Jiquel Lanoe as in first audience / among dancers
- Adolph Lestina as in second audience
- Charles Hill Mailes
- Joseph McDermott as actor in play / at dinner
- W. Chrystie Miller as in first audience
- Antonio Moreno as actor in play
- Alfred Paget as among dancers
- Matt Snyder as in first audience (credited as Matt B. Snyder)
- Charles West as in first audience / in second audience
