= The Invisible Foe =

American film

The Invisible Foe is an American short film. It starred Carlyle Blackwell, Louise Glaum and Raymond Hadley.

Kalem Company was the producing company.

The length is ten minutes.
