= The Song of the Soul (1918 film) =

1918 film by Tom Terriss

- Directed by: Tom Terriss
- Written by: Frederick Buckley(scenario); Shannon Fife(story)
- Produced by: Vitagraph Company of America; Albert E. Smith
- Starring: Alice Joyce
- Cinematography: Joseph Shelderfer
- Distributed by: Greater Vitagraph V-L-S-E
- Release date: March 4, 1918
- Running time: 5 reels
- Country: USA
- Language: Silent...English intertitles

The Song of the Soul is a lost 1918 silent film drama directed by Tom Terriss and starring Alice Joyce. It was produced by the Vitagraph Company of America and distributed by V-L-S-E.

== Cast ==
- Alice Joyce as Ann Fenton
- Percy Standing as Fenton
- Walter McGrail as Dr. Evans
- Bernard Randall as Butch
- Bernard Siegel as Oelsen
- Edith Reeves as Ruth
- Stephen Carr as Billy Fenton
