= A Business Buccaneer =

- Starring: Tom Moore; Alice Joyce; Earle Foxe; Cleo Madison; Stuart Holmes
- Distributed by: General Film Company
- Release date: December 27, 1912
- Country: United States
- Languages: Silent film English intertitles

A Business Buccaneer is a 1912 American short silent comedy film. It was the fifth time Earle Foxe and Alice Joyce had worked together that year.

== Cast ==
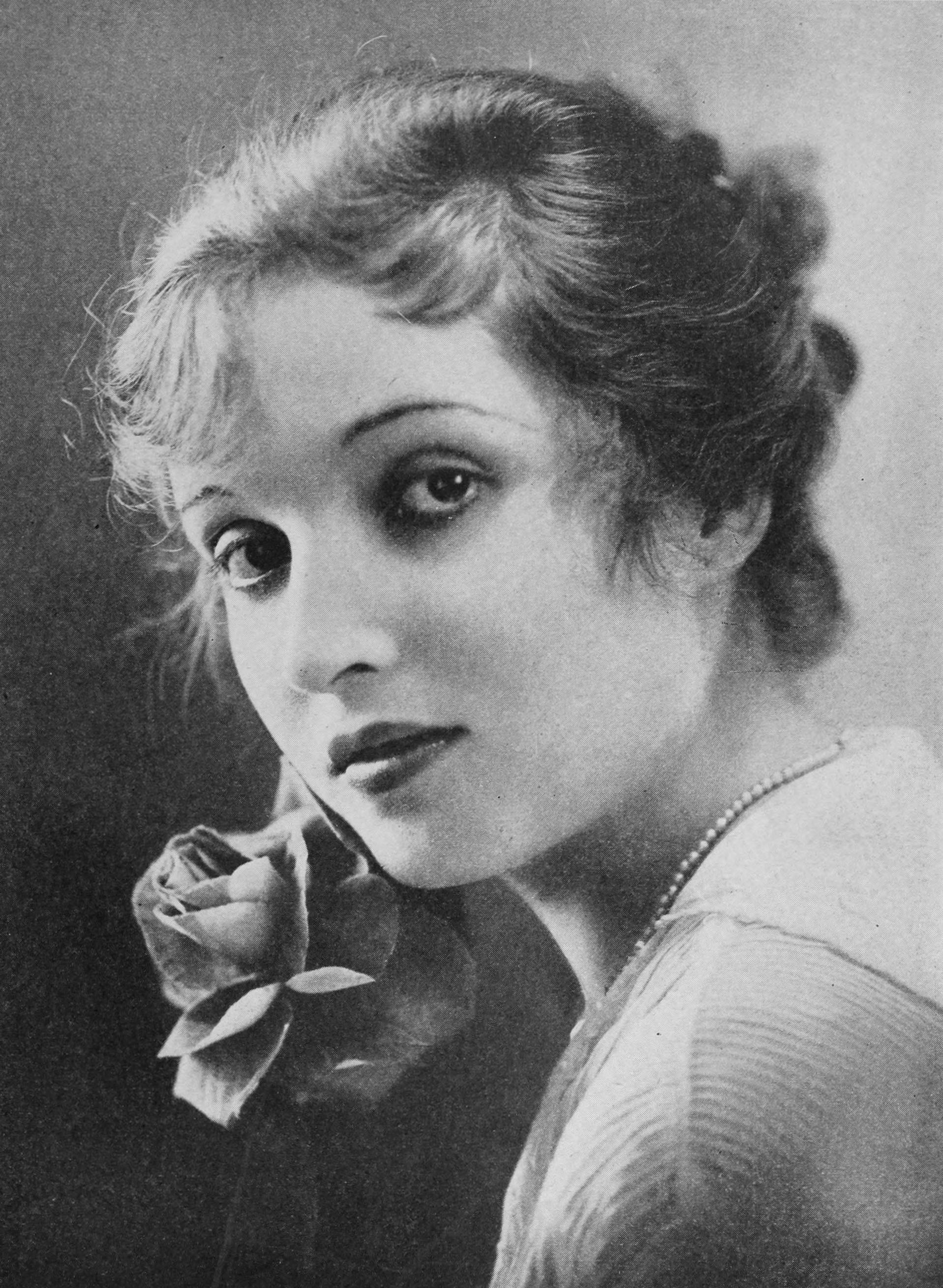
The film starred Alice Joyce.

- Tom Moore as Tom Hopewell
- Alice Joyce as Agnes
- Earle Foxe as Hastings
- Cleo Madison
- Stuart Holmes
