= The Tell-Tale Message =

- Produced by: The Kalem Company
- Starring: Earle Foxe; Hazel Neason; Stuart Holmes
- Distributed by: General Film Company
- Release date: November 20, 1912
- Running time: Short
- Country: United States
- Languages: Silent film English intertitles

The Tell-Tale Message is a 1912 American short silent film drama.

== Cast ==
- Earle Foxe
- Hazel Neason
- Stuart Holmes
- Lawrence Wood
