= A Battle of Wits (1912 film) =

- Directed by: Storm Boyd (assistant)
- Produced by: Kalem Company
- Starring: Tom Moore; Alice Joyce; Earle Foxe
- Distributed by: General Film Company
- Release date: November 25, 1912
- Running time: Short (1 reel)
- Country: United States
- Languages: Silent; English intertitles

A Battle of Wits (1912) is a silent drama motion picture short starring Tom Moore, Alice Joyce and Earle Foxe.

Joyce and Foxe were working together for the fourth time on this picture.

A Battle of Wits was re-released on August 27, 1915.

== Cast ==
- Tom Moore as The Surveyor
- Alice Joyce as Sue Elwood
- Earle Foxe
- Logan Paul
- Stuart Holmes
