= Alice Joyce =

American actress (1890–1955)

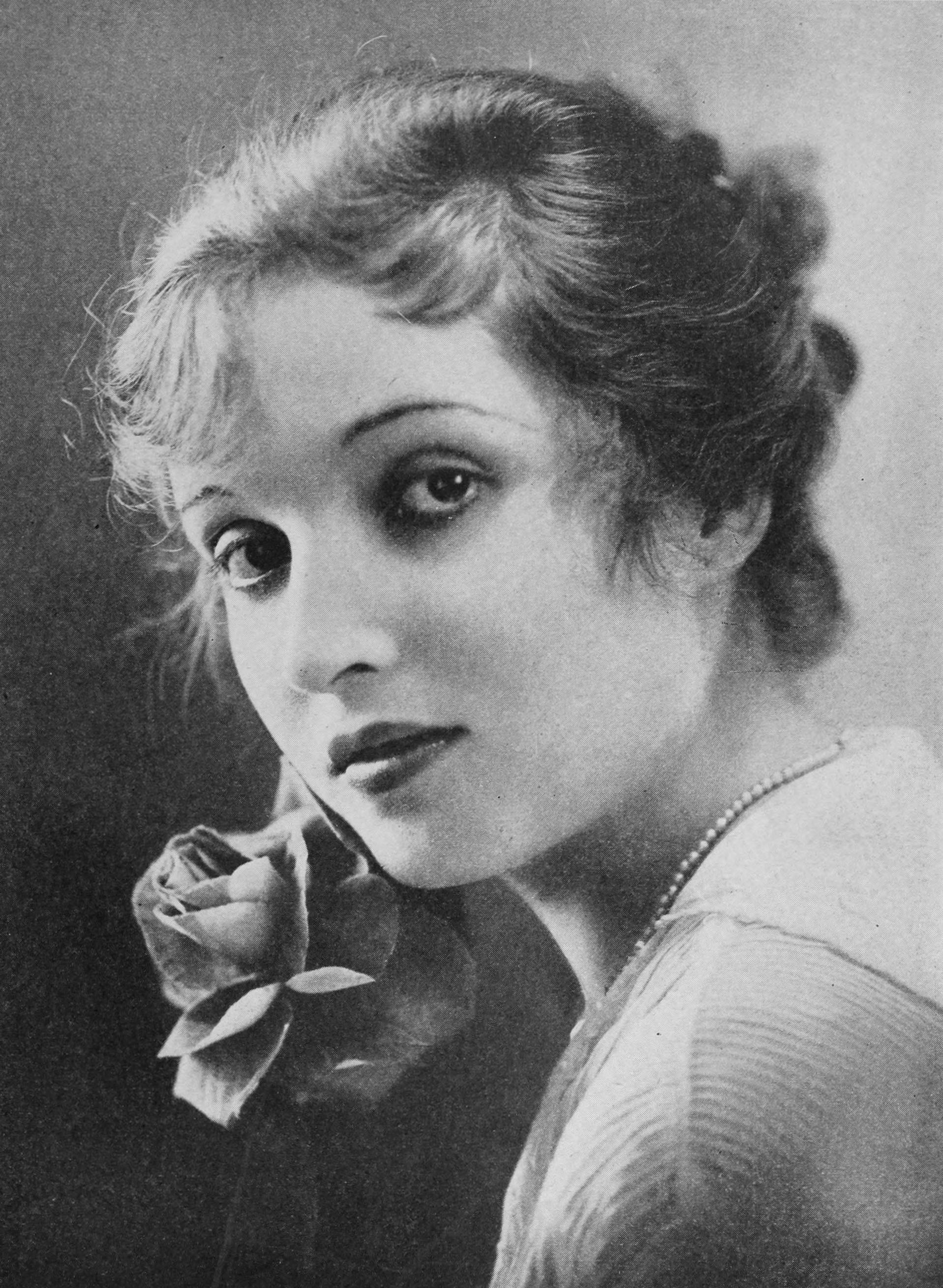
- Joyce in Photoplay (1917)
- Born: Alice Joyce; October 1, 1890; Kansas City, Missouri, U.S.
- Died: October 9, 1955 (aged 65); Los Angeles, California, U.S.
- Occupation: Actress
- Years active: 1910–1930
- Spouses: Tom Moore (m. 1914; div. 1920) James B. Regan (m. 1920; div. 1932) Clarence Brown (m. 1933; div. 1945)
- Children: 2

Alice Joyce Brown (née Joyce; October 1, 1890 – October 9, 1955) was an American actress who appeared in more than 200 silent films during the 1910s and 1920s. Known as "The Madonna of the Cinema," she was noted for her roles in the 1923 film The Green Goddess and its 1930 remake of the same name.

== Early life and career beginnings ==
Alice Joyce was born in Kansas City, Missouri, to John Edward and Vallie Olive McIntyre Joyce. She had a brother, Francis "Frank" Joyce, who was 2 years younger and who later became an entertainment manager. Her father was a smelter of Irish and French ancestry and her mother a Welsh seamstress. Educated at a convent in Maryland, she ran away to New York while still a teenager.

By 1900, her parents' marriage fell apart, and her father took custody of Alice and Frank and moved to Falls Church, Virginia, where Joyce spent most of her childhood. According to the 1910 Census, her mother remarried in 1900 to Leon Faber, and they resided in the Bronx, New York, along with Alice and Frank, where she was employed as a photographer's model and appeared in illustrated songs.

She once said that film producer D.W. Griffith had told her that she reminded him of a cow. Despite this unflattering comment, Joyce was a well-respected actress of the silent film era. Though Griffith did not show any interest in her, she found work modelling for both artists and photographers. One film historian ranks her among the top models of 1910, in the company of Mabel Normand and Anna Nilsson. She posed for some of the better known artists of the day, including Harrison Fisher, Charles Dana Gibson, and Neysa McMein.

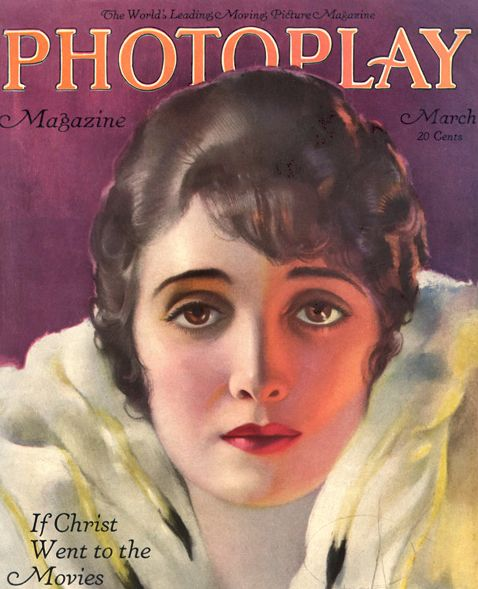
Joyce on the cover of Photoplay, 1920

== Marriages ==
Joyce was married three times, the first time in 1914 to actor Tom Moore with whom she had a daughter, Alice Joyce Moore. They divorced in 1920. The same year, she married James B. Regan, son of the managing director of the old Knickerbocker Hotel; her second daughter was born during this union. They divorced in 1932, shortly after which the actress declared bankruptcy, and then she married for a third time.

Her last marriage came in 1933 in Virginia City, Nevada to film director Clarence Brown; they separated in 1942 and divorced in 1945. The actress retained Brown's name. During their separation, she sued him for reparation on cruelty charges.

== Later Years and Death ==
Joyce made her last movie in 1930, after which she and ex-husband Tom Moore worked a late vaudeville circuit for a time. She declared voluntary bankruptcy in 1933. However, she left an estate of $175,000 at her death in 1955. Joyce was active in women's organizations in the San Fernando Valley in her later years. She did book reviews and made sketches for friends. She died on October 9, 1955, of heart failure and was buried at San Fernando Mission Cemetery.

== Partial filmography ==
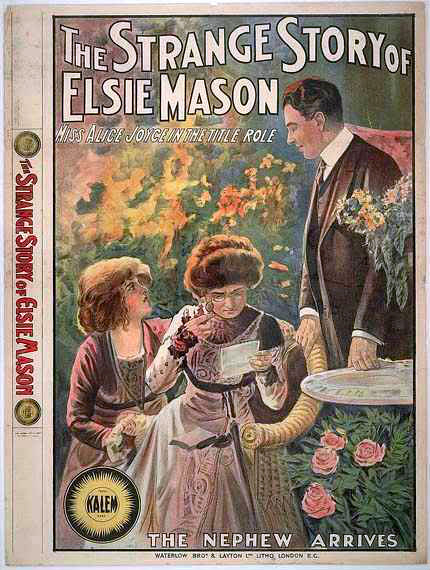
Poster for Kalem's The Strange Story of Elsie Mason (1912)

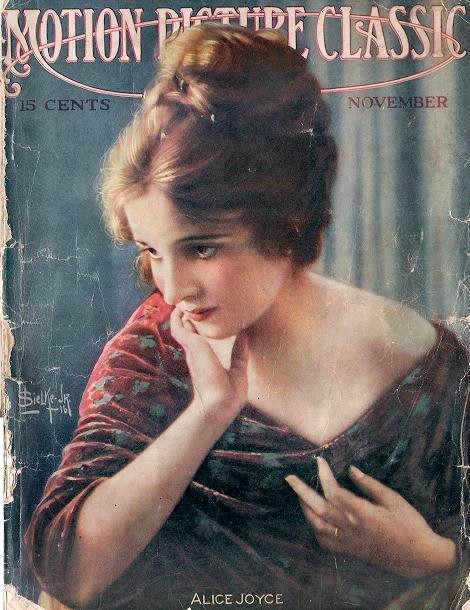
Joyce, cover of Motion Picture Classic, 1916

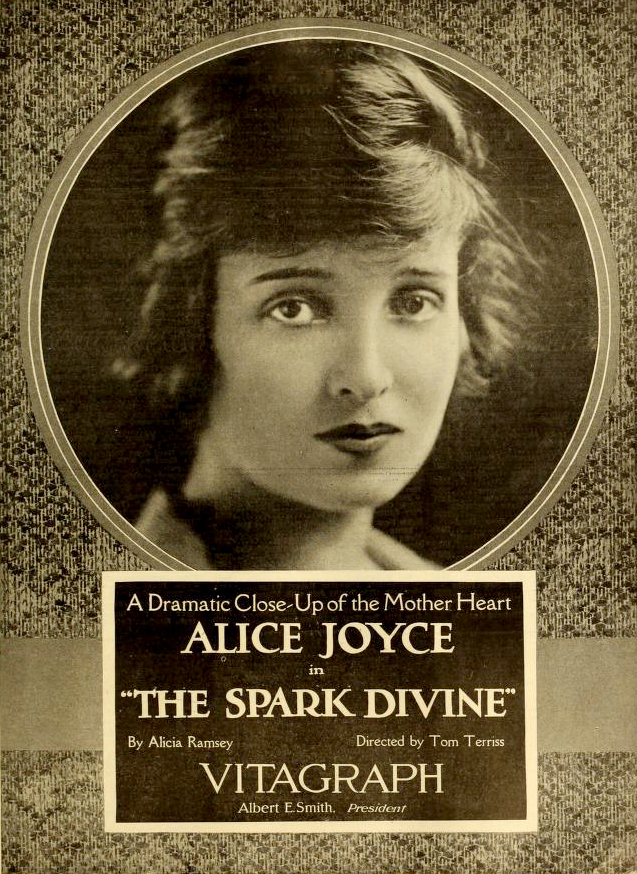
Advertisement for The Spark Divine (1919)

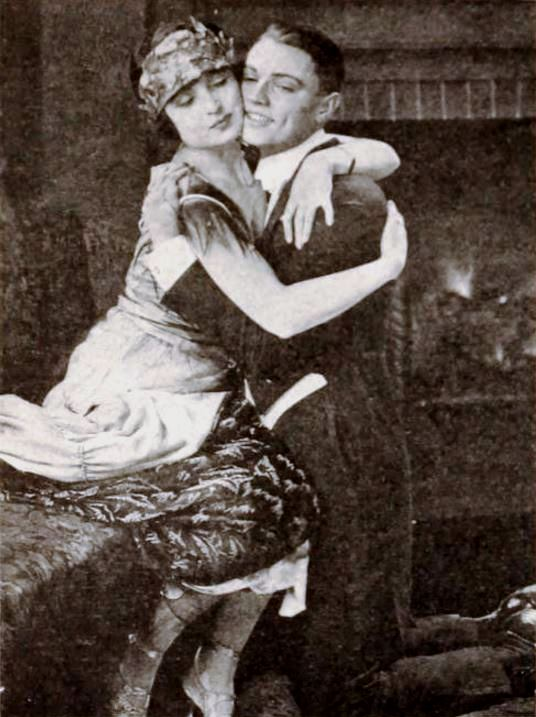
Joyce and Robert Gordon in Dollars and the Woman (1920)

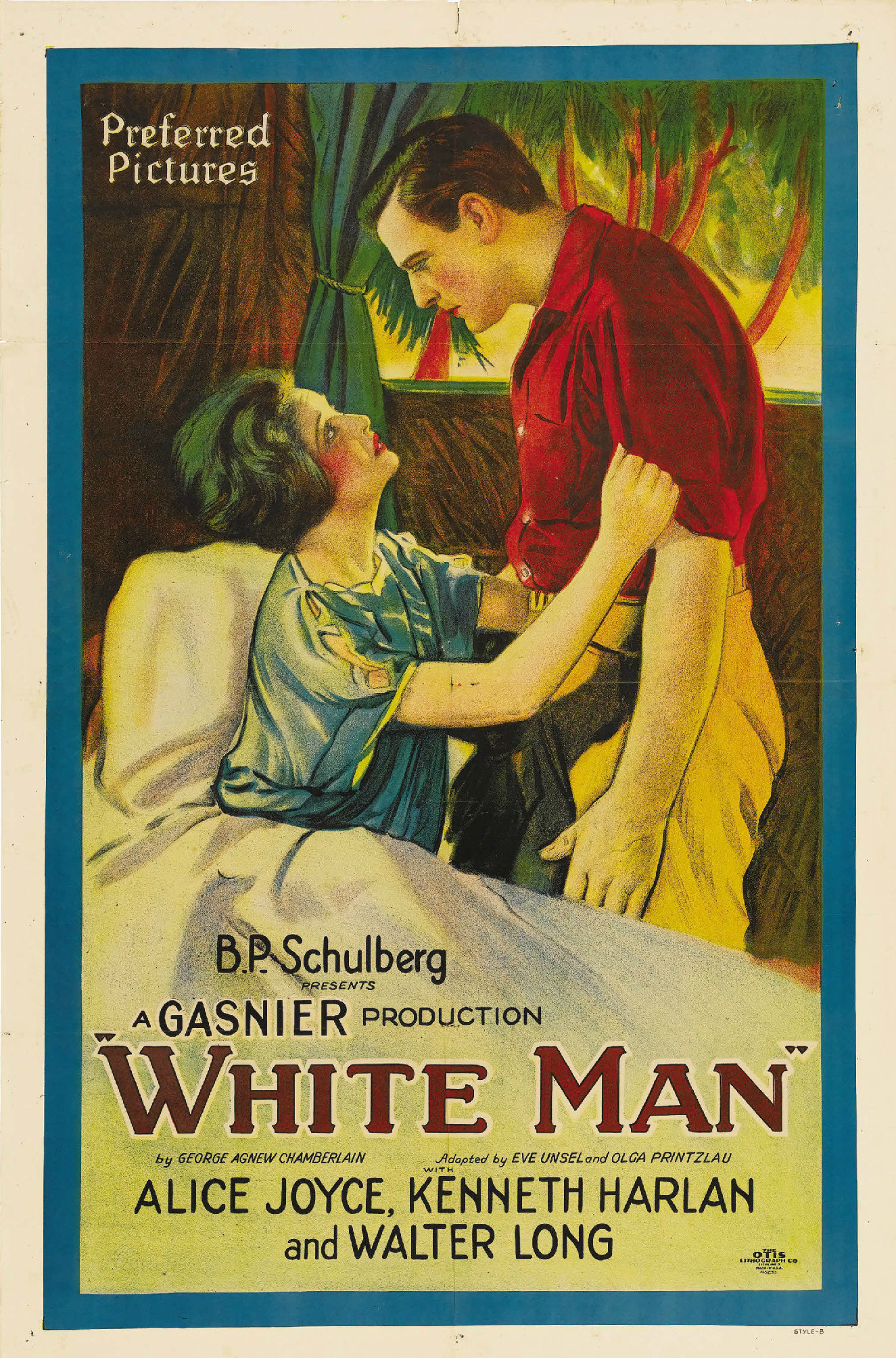
Poster for White Man (1924)

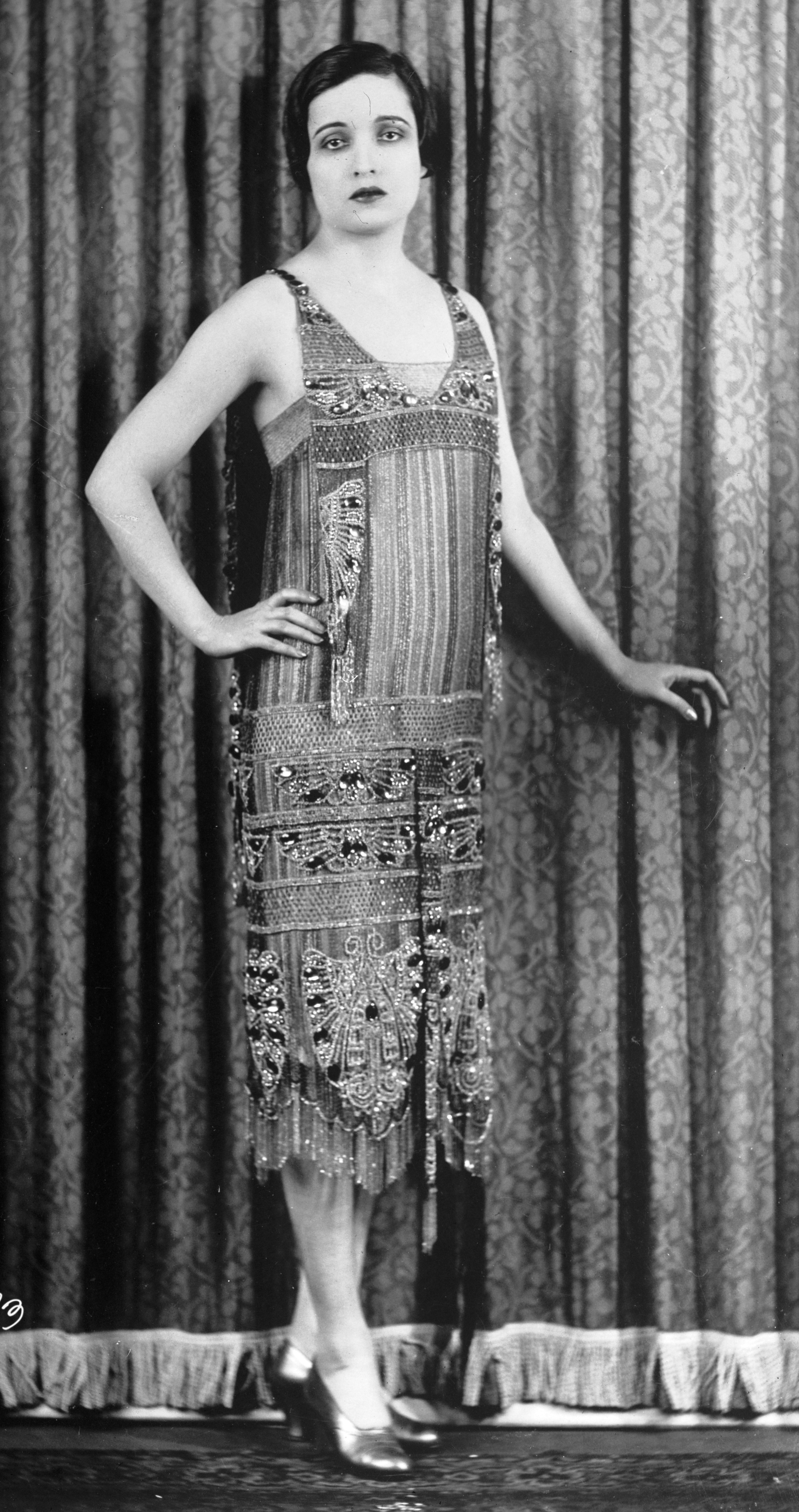
Joyce in 1926

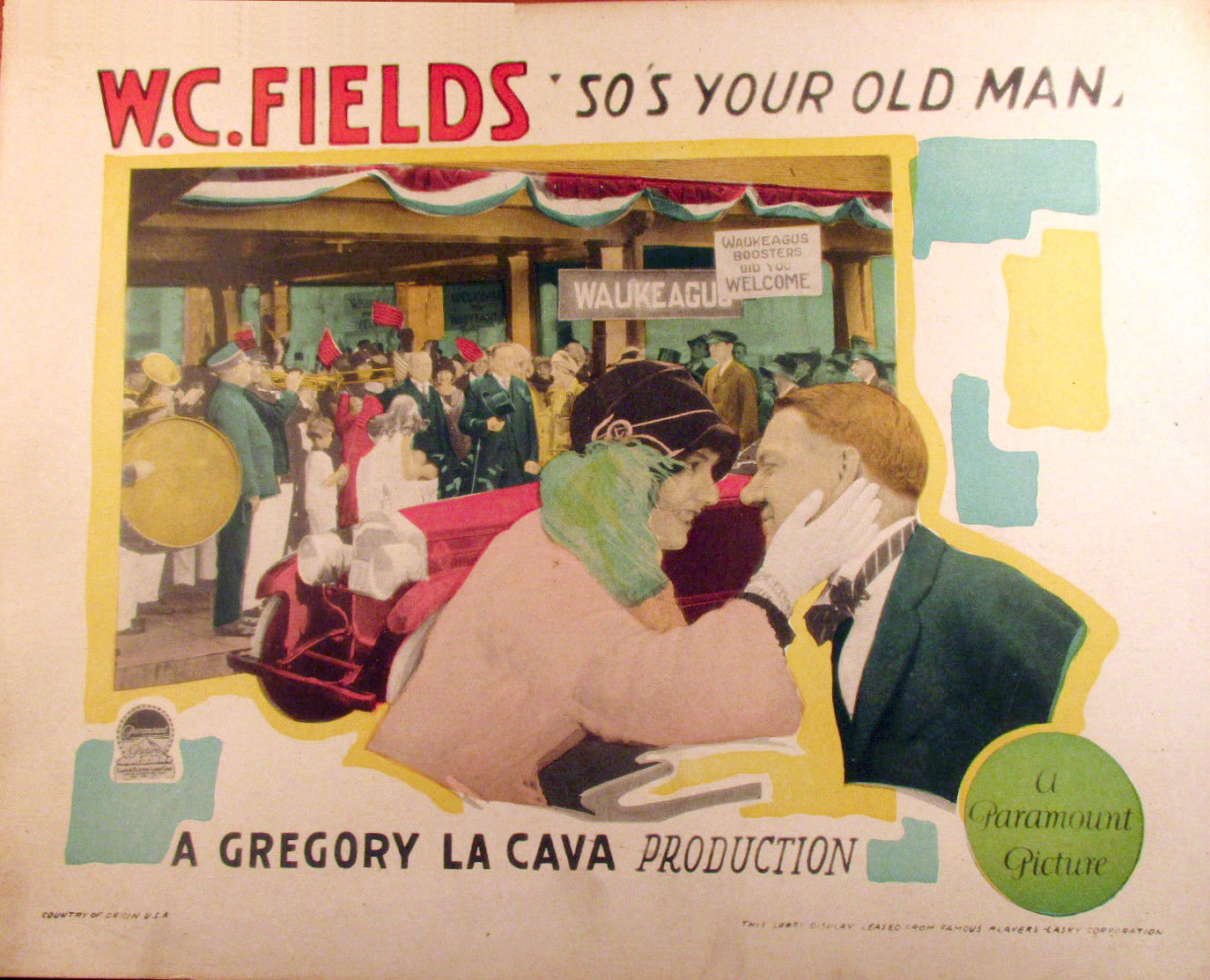
Lobby card with Joyce and W.C. Fields in So's Your Old Man (1926)

- The Deacon's Daughter (1910)
- The Miser's Child (1910)
- The Heart of Edna Leslie (1910)
- An Engineer's Sweetheart (1910)
- The Education of Elizabeth (1910)
- For a Woman's Honor (1910)
- The Roses of the Virgin (1910)
- Rachel (1910)
- The Rescue of Molly Finney (1910)
- Her Indian Mother (1910)
- The Bolted Door (1911)
- The Runaway Engine (1911)
- The Trail of the Pomas Charm (1911)
- The Broken Trail (1911)
- The Lost Ribbon (1911)
- Mexican Filibusterers (1911)
- The Mission Carrier (1911)
- The Hero Track Walker (1911)
- Big Hearted Jim (1911)
- Slim Jim's Last Chance (1911)
- Slabsides (1911)
- The Loyalty of Don Luis Verdugo (1911)
- The Carrier Pigeon (1911)
- Tangled Lives (1911)
- The Love of Summer Morn (1911)
- A Cattle Herder's Romance (1911)
- Reckless Reddy Reforms (1911)
- The Badge of Courage (1911)
- By the Aid of a Lariat (1911)
- The Indian Maid's Sacrifice (1911)
- The Mexican Joan of Arc (1911)
- Over the Garden Wall (1911)
- Peggy, the Moonshiner's Daughter (1911)
- The Wasp (1911)
- Don Ramon's Daughter (1911)
- The Branded Shoulder (1911)
- On the Warpath (1911)
- When Two Hearts Are Won (1911)
- When the Sun Went Out (1911)
- The Alpine Lease (1911)
- The Blackfoot Halfbreed (1911)
- The Mistress of Hacienda del Cerro (1911)
- A Prisoner of Mexico (1911)
- The Peril of the Plains (1911)
- For Her Brother's Sake (1911)
- The Engineer's Daughter (1911)
- When California Was Won (1911)
- Dan, the Lighthouse Keeper (1911)
- The Temptation of Rodney Vane (1911)
- How Betty Captured the Outlaw (1911)
- The Long Arm of the Law (1911)
- Too Much Realism (1911)
- Between Father and Son (1911)
- The Higher Toll (1911)
- Mrs. Simms Serves on the Jury (1912)
- The Russian Peasant (1912)
- An Interrupted Wedding (1912)
- A Princess of the Hills (1912)
- An American Invasion (1912)
- The Alcalde's Conspiracy (1912)
- The Bell of Penance (1912)
- The Defeat of the Brewery Gang (1912)
- Jean of the Jail (1912)
- The Spanish Revolt of 1836 (1912)
- The Secret of the Miser's Cave (1912)
- The Adventures of American Joe (1912)
- The Mexican Revolutionist (1912)
- The Stolen Invention (1912)
- The Outlaw (1912)
- The Gun Smugglers (1912)
- The Bag of Gold (1912)
- The Colonel's Escape (1912)
- The Organ Grinder (1912)
- Saved by Telephone (1912)
- The Suffragette Sheriff (1912)
- Fantasca, the Gipsy (1912)
- The Family Tyrant (1912)
- The Soldier Brothers of Susanna (1912)
- Freed from Suspicion (1912)
- The Wandering Musician (1912)
- Rube Marquard Marries (1912)
- The County Fair (1912)
- The Strange Story of Elsie Mason (1912)
- The Mystery of Grandfather's Clock (1912)
- The Young Millionaire (1912)
- A Battle of Wits (1912)
- A Daughter's Sacrifice (1912)
- A Race with Time (1912)
- The Finger of Suspicion (1912)
- The Street Singer (1912)
- A Business Buccaneer (1912)
- The Flag of Freedom (1913)
- The Nurse at Mulberry Bend (1913)
- The Cub Reporter's Temptation (1913)
- The Senator's Dishonor (1913)
- In the Power of Blacklegs (1913)
- The $20,000 Carat (1913)
- The American Princess (1913)
- The Exposure of the Land Swindlers (1913)
- In the Grip of a Charlatan (1913)
- A Streak of Yellow (1913)
- The Sneak (1913)
- The Heart of an Actress (1913)
- The Adventure of an Heiress (1913)
- The Artist's Sacrifice (1913)
- When Fate Decrees (1913)
- The Pawnbroker's Daughter (1913)
- The Attorney for the Defense (1913)
- The Cloak of Guilt (1913)
- A Victim of Deceit (1913)
- A Thief in the Night (1913)
- A Bolt from the Sky (1913)
- For Her Sister's Sake (1913)
- The Christian (1913)
- The Midnight Message (1913)
- The Riddle of the Tin Soldier (1913)
- Our New Minister (1913)
- Perils of the Sea (1913)
- The Octoroon (1913) (unconfirmed participation)
- The Hunchback (1913)
- An Unseen Terror (1913)
- The Hand Print Mystery (1914)
- The Shadow (1914)
- The Cabaret Dancer (1914)
- The Dance of Death (1914)
- A Celebrated Case (1914)
- Nina o' the Theatre (1914)
- The Show Girl's Glove (1914)
- The Weakling (1914)
- In Wolf's Clothing (1914)
- The Beast (1914)
- The Vampire's Trail (1914)
- The Old Army Coat (1914)
- The Brand (film) (1914)
- The Mystery of the Sleeping Death (1914)
- The Green Rose (1914)
- The Viper (1914)
- Fate's Midnight Hour (1914)
- The Girl and the Stowaway (1914)
- The Lynbrook Tragedy (1914)
- The Riddle of the Green Umbrella (1914)
- The Theft of the Crown Jewels (1914)
- The Price of Silence (1914)
- The School for Scandal (1914)
- The Mayor's Secretary (1914)
- Cast Up by the Sea (1915)
- The Leech (1915)
- The Swindler (1915)
- Her Supreme Sacrifice (1915)
- The White Goddess (1915)
- Unfaithful to His Trust (1915)
- The Girl of the Music Hall (1915)
- The Face of the Madonna (1915)
- Whom the Gods Destroy (1916)
- The Courage of Silence (1917)
- Womanhood, the Glory of the Nation (1917)
- Within the Law (1917)
- The Question (1917)
- The Countess (1917)
- Richard the Brazen (1917)
- An Alabaster Box (1917)
- The Fettered Woman (1917)
- The Woman Between Friends (1918)
- The Song of the Soul (1918)
- The Business of Life (1918)
- The Triumph of the Weak (1918)
- Find the Woman (1918)
- To the Highest Bidder (1918)
- Everybody's Girl (1918)
- The Captain's Captain (1919)
- The Lion and the Mouse (1919)
- The Cambric Mask (1919)
- The Third Degree (1919)
- The Spark Divine (1919)
- The Winchester Woman (1919)
- The Vengeance of Durand (1919)
- Slaves of Pride (1920)
- The Sporting Duchess (1920)
- Dollars and the Woman (1920)
- The Vice of Fools (1920)
- The Prey (1920)
- Cousin Kate (1921)
- Her Lord and Master (1921)
- The Scarab Ring (1921)
- The Inner Chamber (1921)
- The Green Goddess (1923)
- White Man (1924)
- The Passionate Adventure (1924)
- Daddy's Gone A-Hunting (1925)
- The Little French Girl (1925)
- Headlines (1925)
- The Home Maker (1925)
- Stella Dallas (1925)
- Mannequin (1926)
- Dancing Mothers (1926)
- Beau Geste (1926)
- The Ace of Cads (1926)
- So's Your Old Man (1926)
- Sorrell and Son (1927)
- 13 Washington Square (1928)
- The Noose (1928)
- The Rising Generation (1928)
- The Squall (1929)
- The Green Goddess (1930)
- He Knew Women (1930)
- Song o' My Heart (1930)
