= The County Fair (1912 film) =

- Starring: Earle Foxe; Alice Joyce
- Production company: Kalem Company
- Distributed by: General Film Company
- Release date: 1912
- Country: United States
- Languages: Silent; English intertitles

The County Fair is a 1912 American short silent drama film starring Earle Foxe and Alice Joyce who had acted together earlier in the year in The Street Singer. It was the second film of Earle Foxe.

== Cast ==
- Alice Joyce as Mary
- Earle Foxe as John
- Hazel Neason as Lazelle
- James B. Ross as Jim Burke
- William R. McKay as Amasa Terry
- Miriam Lawrence as Sally Terry
