= Carlyle Blackwell =

American silent film actor, director, and producer (1884–1955)

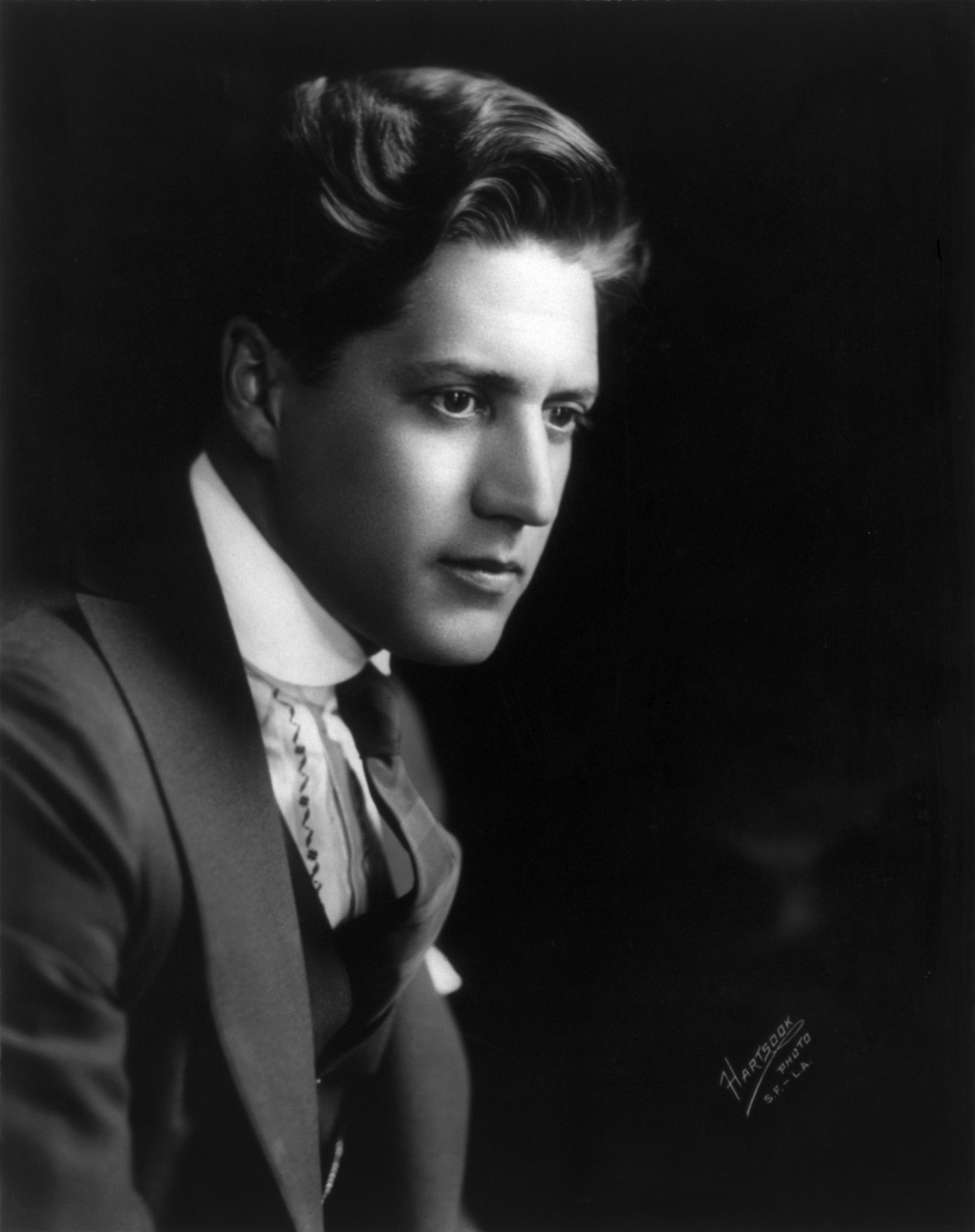
- Blackwell, c. 1915
- Born: January 20, 1884; Troy, Pennsylvania, U.S.
- Died: June 17, 1955 (aged 71); Miami, Florida, U.S.
- Occupations: Stage, film actor
- Spouses: Ruth Hartman (m. 1909; div. 1923) Leah Barnato (m. 1926; div. 1933) Avonne Taylor (m. 1933; div. 1936) Nancy Nichelson Bradsby (died 1947) Ann Enoch (m. 1948)

Carlyle Blackwell (January 20, 1884 – June 17, 1955) was an American silent film actor, director and producer.

== Early years ==
Blackwell was born in Troy, Pennsylvania. He studied at Cornell University before J. Stuart Blackton discovered him and turned his interest to acting.

== Career ==
He made his film debut in the 1910 Vitagraph Studios production of Uncle Tom's Cabin directed by J. Stuart Blackton. Between then and 1930, when talkies ended his acting career, he appeared in more than 180 films. For his contributions to the film industry, Blackwell has a motion pictures star on the Hollywood Walk of Fame at 6340 Hollywood Boulevard. In his later years he was also active as a producer and writer. After his final film in 1930, Blackwell turned to performing on stage in live theatre.

== Personal life and death ==
On July 8, 1909, he married Ruth Hartman. In 1923, he divorced Hartman. On July 19, 1926, in London, he married Leah Barnato. In 1933, he and Barnato divorced, and he married Avonne Taylor. In 1934, the couple purchased a farmhouse estate in Brookfield, Connecticut. They were divorced in 1936. He later was married to Nancy Nichelson Bradsby, widow of Hillerich & Bradsby baseball bat executive Frank Bradsby, until her death in 1947. In 1948 he married Ann Enoch, and they were still wed when he died.

On June 17, 1955, Blackwell died in Miami, aged 71.

== Filmography ==
=== Partial filmography ===
- Uncle Tom's Cabin (1910)
- On Her Doorsteps (1910)
- Doctor Cupid (1911)
- Slim Jim's Last Chance (1911)
- The Wasp (1911)
- Over the Garden Wall (1911)
- The Blackfoot Halfbreed (1911)
- The Temptation of Rodney Vane (1911)
- Norma from Norway (1911)
- The Gun Smugglers (1912)
- The Invisible Foe (1913)
- The Ocean Waif (1916)
- A Woman's Way (1916)
- The Crimson Dove (1917)
- The Page Mystery (1917)
- The Marriage Market (1917)
- The Good for Nothing (1917)
- The Burglar (1917)
- The Social Leper (1917)
- Youth (1917)
- His Brother's Wife (1916)
- Stolen Orders (1918)
- The Golden Wall (1918)
- The Beloved Blackmailer (1918)
- By Hook or Crook (1918)
- The Road to France (1918)
- Hitting the Trail (1918)
- Courage for Two (1919)
- Love in a Hurry (1919)
- Three Green Eyes (1919)
- The Rolling Road (1928)

=== As a director ===
- Chasing the Smuggler (1914) - his first movie as a director
- The Man Who Could Not Lose (1914)
- The Good for Nothing (1917)
- Leap to Fame (1918)
- His Royal Highness (1918)
- Beyond the Cities (1930)
- Bedrock (1930)

=== His work in England ===
Carlyle Blackwell went to England in 1921 and played the first Bulldog Drummond in film, in a movie called Bulldog Drummond (1922).

On Page 18, Chapter 2, in 'A Notable Woman', the English Diarist, Jean Lucey Pratt, is quoted as having seen Blackwell filming The Rolling Road,

Saturday, Sept. 11th., 1927

On the rocks, just below the Mullion Hotel...we discovered ...he is Carlyle Blackwell.

He stayed and worked in England until 1931, both in the theater and in movies.

- His cinematic works in England include:
  - The Virgin Queen (1923)
  - Shadow of Egypt (1924)
  - She (1925)
  - Monte Carlo (1925)
  - The Rolling Road (1928)
  - The Wrecker (1929)
  - Der Hund von Baskerville (1929)
- his only talkies:
  - Bedrock (1930)
  - Beyond the Cities (1930)

=== Other movies ===
==== Main roles ====
He took part in many other productions which increased his popularity. To his numerous appearances in front of the camera belong among others:

- An American Invasion (1912)
- The Adventures of American Joe (1912)
- The Colonel's Escape (1912)
- The Parasite (1912)
- The Mayor's Crusade (1912)
- The Boomerang (1913)
- The Redemption (1913)
- The Struggle (1913)
- A Daughter of the Underworld (1913)
- The Spitfire (1914)
- The Secret Formula (1914)
- The Last Chapter (1915)
- The Shadow of Doubt (1916)
- Beyond the Wall (1916)
- Youth (1917)
- The Good for Nothing (1917)
- The Cabaret (1918)
- The Beloved Blackmailer (1918)
- Three Green Eyes (1919)
- The Restless Sex (1920)
- Bulldog Drummond (1922)

==== Other roles ====
- Brother Man (1910)
- A Dixie Mother (1910)
- The Trail of the Pomas Charm (1911)
- Bertha's Mission (1911)
- The Mission Carrier (1911)
- Big Hearted Jim (1911)
- Slabsides (1911)
- Tangles Lives (1911)
- The Love of Summer Morn (1911)
- A Cattle Herder's Romance (1911)
- Reckless Reddy Reforms (1911)
- The Badge of Courage (1911)
- On the Warpath (1911)
- The Indian Maid's Sacrifice (1911)
- Peggy, the Moonshiner's Daughter (1911)
- The Alpine Lease (1911)
- The Mistress of Hacienda del Cerro (1911)
- The Peril of the Plains (1911)
- For Her Brother's Sake (1911)
- How Betty Captured the Outlaw (1911)
- The Higher Toll (1911)
- Jean of the Jail (1912)
- The Russian Peasant (1912)
- An Interrupted Wedding (1912)
- A Princess of the Hills (1912)
- The Alcalde's Conspiracy (1912)
- The Bell of Penance (1912)
- The Spanish Revolt of 1836 (1912)
- The Outlaw (1912)
- The Secret of the Miser's Cave (1912)
- The Mexican Revolutionist (1912)
- The Stolen Invention (1912)
- The Gun Smugglers (1912)
- The Bag of Gold (1912)
- The Organ Grinder (1912)
- Saved by Telephone (1912)
- The Suffragette Sheriff (1912)
- Fantasca, the Gipsy (1912)
- The Family Tyrant (1912)
- Freed from Suspicion (1912)
- The Wandering Musician (1912)
- The Kentucky Girl (1912)
- The Daughter of the Sheriff (1912)
- The Frenzy of Firewater (1912)
- The Apache Renegade (1912)
- The Village Vixen (1912)
- When Youth Meets Youth (1912)
- The Redskin Raiders (1912)
- The Plot That Failed (1912)
- The Peril of the Cliffs (1912)
- The Power of a Hymn (1912)
- The Skinflint (1912)
- Mountain Dew (1912)
- Days of '49 (1912)
- The Flower Girl's Romance (1912)
- Red Wing and the Paleface (1912)
- The Indian Uprising at Santa Fe (1912)
- The Water Rights War (1912)
- The Two Runaways (1912)
- A Dangerous Wager (1913)
- The Usurer (1913)
- Red Sweeney's Mistake (1913)
- The Pride of Angry Bear (1913)
- The Last Blockhouse (1913)
- The Buckskin Coat (1913)
- A Life in the Balance (1913)
- The Mountain Witch (1913)
- The Missing Bonds (1913)
- The Honor System (1913)
- The Attack at Rocky Pass (1913)
- The Sacrifice (1913)
- The California Oil Crooks (1913)
- The Wayward Son (1913)
- The Cheyenne Massacre (1913)
- The Poet and the Soldier (1913)
- The Battle for Freedom (1913)
- The Tragedy of Big Eagle Mine (1913)
- The Fight at Grizzly Gulch (1913)
- The Girl and the Gangster (1913)
- Intemperance (1913)
- The Skeleton in the Closet (1913)
- The Invaders (1913)
- Trooper Billy (1913)
- The Man Who Vanished (1913)
- Perils of the Sea (1913)
- The Plot of India's Hillmen (1913)
- The Invisible Foe (1913)
- The Masquerader (1914)
- The Convict's Story (1914)
- Out in the Rain (1914)
- The Fatal Clues (1914)
- Chasing the Smugglers (1914)
- The Award of Justice (1914)
- The Wiles of a Siren (1914)
- The Detective's Sister (1914)
- The Fringe on the Glove (1914)
- Mrs. Peyton's Pearls (1914)
- The Political Boss (1914)
- Such a Little Queen (1914)
- The Key to Yesterday (1914)
- The Man Who Could Not Lose (1914)
- The Uncanny Room (1915)
- The High Hand (1915)
- The Puppet Crown (1915)
- Mr. Grex of Monte Carlo (1915)
- The Secret Orchard (1915)
- The Case of Becky (1915)
- The Clarion (1916)
- His Brother's Wife (1916)
- Sally in Our Alley (1916)
- A Woman's Way (1916)
- The Ocean Waif (1916)
- The New South (1916)
- The Marriage Market (1917)
- On Dangerous Ground (1917)
- A Square Deal (1917)
- The Social Leper (1917)
- The Page Mystery (1917)
- The Crimson Dove (1917)
- The Price of Pride (1917)
- The Burglar (1917)
- The Beautiful Mrs. Reynolds (1918)
- His Royal Highness (1918)
- The Way Out (1918)
- Leap to Fame (1918)
- Stolen Orders (1918)
- The Golden Wall (1918)
- By Hook or Crook (1918)
- The Road to France (1918)
- Hitting the Trail (1918)
- Love in a Hurry (1919)
- Courage for Two (1919)
- Hit or Miss (1919)
- The Third Woman (1920)
- The Beloved Vagabond (1923)
- The Two Boys (1924)
- Riding for a King (1926)
- Beating the Book (1926)
- The Crooked Billet (1929)

=== As producer ===
- The Lodger (1927)
- Blighty (1927)
- One of the Best (1927)
- The Rolling Road (1928)
- Bedrock (1930)
- Beyond the Cities (1930)

=== As a writer ===
- Beyond the Cities (1930)
