= The Street Singer (1912 film) =

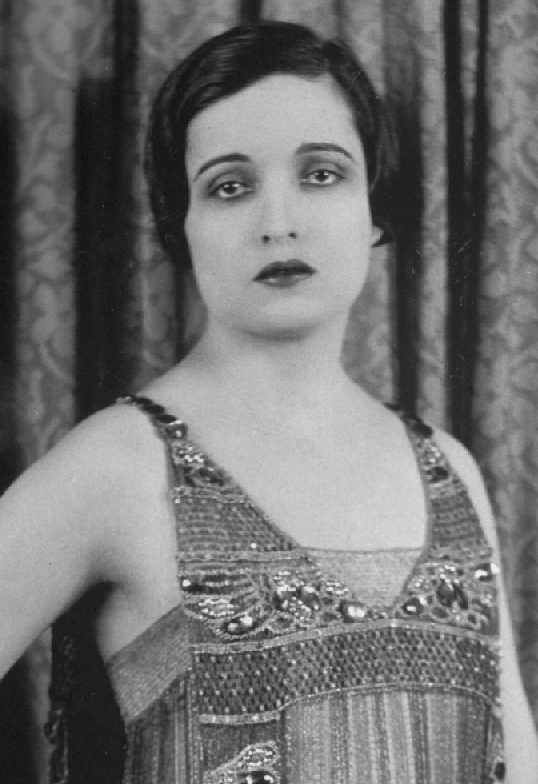
- Alice Joyce as Pepita
- Produced by: The Kalem Company
- Starring: Earle Foxe; Alice Joyce
- Distributed by: General Film Company
- Release date: September 13, 1912
- Running time: Short
- Country: United States
- Language: Silent (English intertitles)

The Street Singer is a 1912 American short silent drama film. The film starred Earle Foxe and Alice Joyce. It was Foxe's first film, aged seventeen.

The film was made into a successful musical in 1924 with a libretto by Frederick Lonsdale and music by Harold Fraser-Simson, starring Phyllis Dare. It played at the Lyric Theatre for 360 performances and enjoyed successful tours.

== Cast ==
- Alice Joyce as Pepita
- Earle Foxe as Karl
- Mayme Kelso as Mrs. Burleigh
- Adelaide Lawrence
