= Manhandled =

Manhandled is the title of two films:

- Manhandled (1924 film), a silent drama starring Gloria Swanson
- Manhandled (1949 film), a film noir featuring Dorothy Lamour, Dan Duryea, and Sterling Hayden
