= Born Rich =

Born Rich may refer to:

- Born Rich (2003 film), a 2003 documentary by Jamie Johnson, heir to the Johnson & Johnson fortune
- Born Rich (TV series), a 2009 TVB television drama produced and created by Chong Wai-kin
- Born Rich (1924 film), a 1924 American comedy film
