= Nathaniel Benchley =

American author (1915–1981)

- Born: Nathaniel Goddard Benchley; November 13, 1915; Newton, Massachusetts, U.S.
- Died: December 14, 1981 (aged 66); Boston, Massachusetts, U.S.
- Occupations: Writer; journalist
- Spouse: Marjorie Bradford Benchley
- Children: Peter Benchley; Nat Benchley
- Parent: Robert Benchley
- Writing career
- Genres: Children's literature; humorous fiction; biography; historical fiction

Nathaniel Goddard Benchley (November 13, 1915 – December 14, 1981) was an American author from Massachusetts.

== Early life ==
Born in Newton, Massachusetts to a literary family, he was the son of Robert Benchley (1889–1945), a noted American writer, humorist, critic, and actor and one founder of the Algonquin Round Table in New York City, and Gertrude Darling. He graduated from Phillips Exeter Academy and Harvard College.

Benchley enlisted in the U.S. Navy prior to the attack on Pearl Harbor. He served as a public relations officer, and on destroyers and patrol craft for North Atlantic convoy duty during the Battle of the Atlantic, and was transferred to the Pacific Theater in 1945.

== Career ==
After the war Benchley worked for the weekly magazine Newsweek as an assistant drama editor. Harcourt, Brace published Benchley's first book in 1950, Side Street, a novel featuring "hilarious activities of two New York City families living in the East Sixties"—that is, living on the East Side of Manhattan, near the 60th Street. He wrote a biography of his father Robert that McGraw-Hill published in 1955. In 1960 Harper & Row published his second novel, Sail A Crooked Ship, and Random House his first children's book, retold from Sindbad the Sailor with illustrations by Tom O'Sullivan.

Benchley was the respected author of much children's fiction that provides readers an experience of certain animal species, historical settings, and so on (Oscar Otter, Sam The Minuteman, etc.). He presented diverse locales and topics: for instance, Bright Candles recounts the experiences of a 16-year-old Danish boy during the German occupation of Denmark in World War II; Small Wolf features a Native American boy who meets white men on the island of Manhattan and learns that their ideas about land are different from those of his own people.

Sail A Crooked Ship was adapted as a comedy feature movie of the same name by Columbia Pictures in 1961. His 1961 novel The Off-Islanders was made into comedy feature The Russians Are Coming, the Russians Are Coming by director/producer Norman Jewison in 1965. The Visitors (1965) was adapted as a horror/comedy feature The Spirit Is Willing by Paramount Pictures in 1967. In October 1975, ABC showed the made-for-television drama Sweet Hostage, based on Benchley's 1968 novel Welcome To Xanadu.

Benchley was a friend of the actor Humphrey Bogart and wrote a biography of Bogart published in 1975.

== Personal life ==
Benchley and Margaret Bradford were married not long after his college years. They settled in New York City and had two sons, one before and one after World War II. His eldest son Peter Benchley (1940–2006) was a writer, best known for the novel Jaws and its 1975 screen adaptation, directed by Steven Spielberg. Younger son Nat Benchley is a writer and actor who has portrayed his grandfather, Robert Benchley, in a one-man, semi-biographical stage show, Benchley Beside Himself. The show was a compilation of Robert Benchley's best monologues, short movies, radio rantings, and pithy pieces as recalled, edited, and acted by grandson Nat, combined with anecdotes, family reminiscences and friends' perspectives.

Nathaniel Benchley died 1981 in Boston and was interred in the family plot at Prospect Hill Cemetery in Nantucket.

== Bibliography ==
=== Novels ===
- Side Street (Harcourt, Brace, 1950)
- A Firm Word or Two (1958)
- Sail a crooked ship. New York: McGraw-Hill. 1960.
- The off-islanders. New York: McGraw-Hill. 1961.
- Catch a Falling Spy (1964)
- A Winter's Tale (1964)
- The Visitors (1965)
- The Monument : A Satiric Novel (1966)
- Welcome to Xanadu (1968)
- The Wake of the Icarus (1969)
- Lassiter's Folly (1971)
- The Hunters Moon (1972)
- A Necessary End: A Novel of World War II (1976)
- Sweet Anarchy (1979)
- Portrait of a Scoundrel (1979)
- All Over Again (1981)
- Speakeasy (1982)

=== Non-fiction ===
- The Benchley Roundup: A Selection by Nathaniel Benchley of His Favorites (1954), by Robert Benchley, LCCN 54--8937
- Robert Benchley, a biography. New York: McGraw-Hill. 1955.
- Humphrey Bogart (1975)

=== Essays and reporting ===
- "Introduction", Twentieth Century Parody, American and British, ed. Burling Lowrey (1960), OCLC 338183
- Benchley, Nathaniel (1953). "Are husbands helpless?". In Birmingham, Frederic A. (ed.). The girls from Esquire. London: Arthur Barker. pp. 214–218.

=== Short fiction ===
Title	Year	First published	Reprinted/collected	Notes
Short cut	1950	Benchley, Nathaniel (January 28, 1950). "Short cut". The New Yorker. 25 (49): 26–29..		

=== Plays ===
- The frogs of spring, a comedy in three acts (1954) https://lccn.loc.gov/54036696

=== Children's books ===
- Sinbad, the sailor. Illustrated by Tom O'Sullivan. New York: Random House. 1960.
- Welcome to Xanadu (1968)
- The Flying Lesson of Gerald Pelican (1970), illus. Mamoru Funai
- Feldman Fieldmouse: A Fable (1971), illus. Hilary Knight
- Gone and Back (1971) – Oklahoma "pioneer adventure of Obediah Taylor, a boy reaching manhood" OCLC 129030
- The Magic Sled (1972), illus. Mel Furukawa; UK title, The Magic Sledge
- Only Earth and Sky Last Forever (1972) – "Although recognizing the end of the Indians' freedom is near, a young Cheyenne still chooses to fight with Crazy Horse", OCLC 584020
- The Deep Dives of Stanley Whale (1973), illus. Mischa Richter
- Bright Candles: A Novel of the Danish Resistance (1974) – features "a sixteen-year-old Danish boy during the German occupation", OCLC 852747
- Beyond the Mists: A Novel (1975) – features "an adventurous youth who travels to Vinland with Leif Eriksson", OCLC 1728948
- Kilroy and the Gull (1977), illus. John Schoenherr – a Marineland killer whale "escapes to life on the open sea with his friend Morris the sea gull", OCLC 2372722
- Demo and the Dolphin (1981), illus. Stephen Gammell
- Snip (1981), illus. Irene Trivas
- Walter, the Homing Pigeon (1981), illus. Whitney Darrow

I Can Read series

- Red Fox and His Canoe (1964), illustrated by Arnold Lobel
- Oscar Otter (1966), illus. Lobel
- The Strange Disappearance of Arthur Cluck (1967), illus. Lobel
- A Ghost Named Fred (1968), illus. Ben Shecter
- Sam, the Minuteman (1969), illus. Lobel
- The Several Tricks of Edgar Dolphin (1970), illus. Mamoru Funai
- Small Wolf (1972), illus. Joan Sandin
- Snorri and the Strangers (1976), illus. Don Bolognese
- George, the Drummer Boy (1977), illus. Bolognese
- Running Owl the Hunter (1979), illus. Funai
