= Zyllah Inez Shannon =

American actress

Zyllah Inez Shannon was an American actress who performed on stage and screen. In one of her theatrical roles she portrayed an intellectually advanced child.

== Biography ==
Zyllah Inez Shannon was born in Missouri, to a family with six generations of history in theater. Her mother, Inez Shannon, was an actress and musician prominent in the 1910s.

Zyllah began appearing onstage at age two. Her best-known role was that of the young orphan Mary Margaret in Channing Pollock's play The Fool.

== Theater ==
- The White Cat (1905)
- Confessions of a Wife (1907)
- The Fool Has Said in His Heart - There is No God (1908)
- The Family (1910)
- Youth (1920)
- The Fool (1923)
- The Front Page (1929)

== Filmography ==
- The Beloved Adventuress (1917), as Mrs. Nicholson
- The Heart of a Girl (1918), as Mrs. Murphy
- The Road to France (1918), as Mrs. O'Leary
- The World to Live In (1919), as Ida
- The Plunger (1920), as Mrs. Mullin
- Cousin Kate (1921), as Mrs. Spencer
- Two Shall Be Born (1924)
