= Cousin Kate (film) =

1921 film

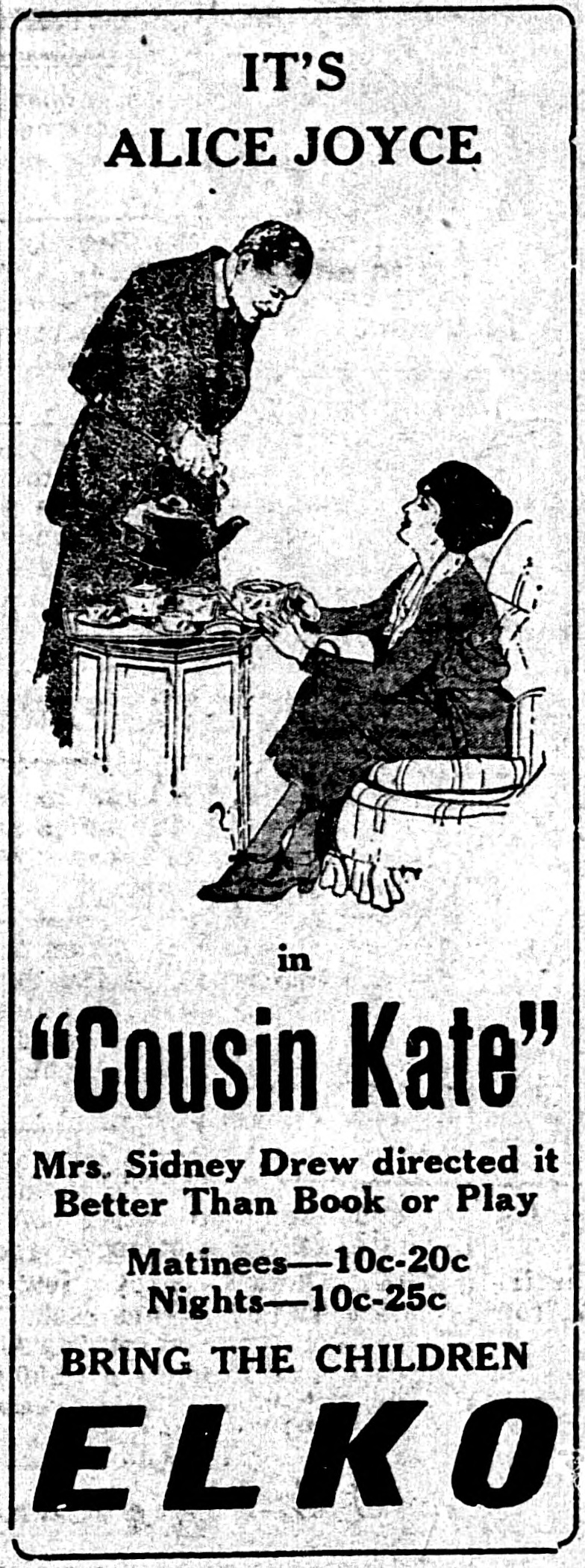
- Newspaper advertisement
- Directed by: Lucille McVey
- Written by: Lillian Case Russell (adaptation)
- Based on: Cousin Kate by Hubert Henry Davies
- Produced by: Albert E. Smith
- Starring: Alice Joyce; Gilbert Emery
- Cinematography: Joseph Shelderfer
- Distributed by: Vitagraph Company of America
- Release date: January 1921
- Running time: 50 minutes
- Country: United States
- Language: Silent (English intertitles)

Cousin Kate is a lost 1921 American drama film produced and released by the Vitagraph Company of America. It is based on a 1903 play by Hubert Henry Davies. On the Broadway stage Ethel Barrymore made the role of Kate Curtis her own and was identified with it for many years. This film version was directed by a relative of Barrymore's, Lucille McVey, who was the second wife of Barrymore's uncle Sidney Drew. Alice Joyce stars in this film version.

== Cast ==
- Alice Joyce as Kate Curtis
- Gilbert Emery as Heath Desmond
- Beth Martin as Amy Spencer
- Inez Shannon as Mrs. Spencer
- Leslie Austin as Reverend James Bartlett
- Freddie Verdi as Bobby
- Frances Miller as Jane (billed as Frances Miller Grant)
- Henry Hallam as Bishop
