= Cass Daley =

American actress, comedian and singer (1915–75)

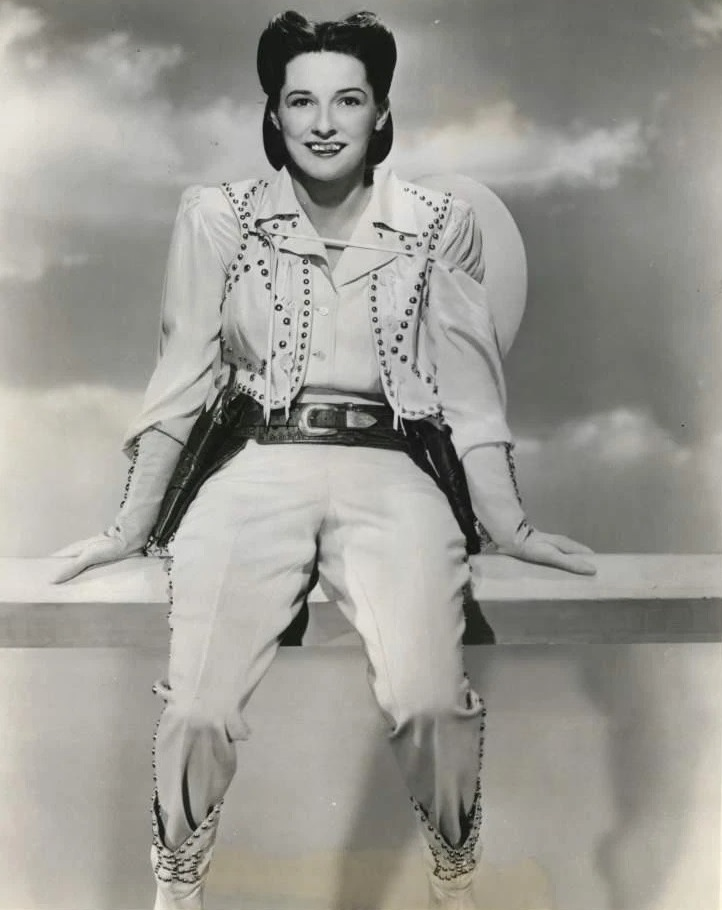
- Daley in 1944
- Born: Catherine Dailey; July 17, 1915
- Died: March 22, 1975 (aged 59); Hollywood, California, U.S.
- Occupations: Actress, comedian, singer
- Years active: 1936–1975
- Spouses: Frank Kinsella (m. 1941–?); Robert Williamson (m. 1966–1975)

Cass Daley (born Catherine Dailey; July 17, 1915 – March 22, 1975) was an American actress, comedian and singer.

== Career ==
The daughter of an Irish streetcar conductor, Daley began singing as a child in front of neighborhood storefronts. Noted for her buck teeth and comical singing style, she sang at clubs as a teen while working as a hat-check girl and electrician.

Before Daley became a professional entertainer, she entertained other employees during lunch hours at the hosiery mill at which she worked in Pennsylvania, including an impersonation of the boss among her skits.

In the 1930s, she began a stage career, including a role in a production advertised as a "Great Vaudeville Show" in 1934. She appeared in the 1936-1937 Ziegfeld Follies featured as the "Cyclone of Syncopation."

Daley started to perform at night clubs and on the radio as a band vocalist in the 1940s. She also embarked on a movie career, most notably in The Fleet's In (1942) with Dorothy Lamour and Betty Hutton and Crazy House (1943) with Ole Olsen and Chic Johnson. She also starred opposite Dick Powell and Dorothy Lamour in Riding High in 1943, and opposite Eddie Bracken and Diana Lynn in Out of This World in 1945. She had a part in Red Garters opposite Rosemary Clooney in 1954, and her last movie appearances were in The Spirit Is Willing in 1967 and in Norwood in 1970.

In 1944–1945, she was a regular on The Frank Morgan Show on NBC radio. As a frequent radio guest, she appeared semi-regularly in 1944 on The Bob Burns Show on NBC. She was also a very popular singer with the troops overseas during World War II, and appeared many times on Armed Forces Radio Service (AFRS) broadcasts such as Command Performance and Mail Call. In 1945, she joined the cast of The Fitch Bandwagon, another popular radio show. In 1950, she starred in her own radio show, The Cass Daley Show.

Daley recorded several singles with Hoagy Carmichael. "The Old Piano Roll Blues" peaked at #11 on the Billboard Hot 100 chart and stayed on the chart for ten weeks in 1950, and "Aba Daba Honeymoon" peaked at #23 in 1951, and charted for three weeks.

She recorded a version of "Put the Blame on Mame" in 1946, and it sold 150,000 copies in just two months.

With radio in decline, she retired to raise her son in Newport Beach. After her divorce from husband Frank Kinsella, she attempted a comeback in the 1970s appearing in small television, film and stage roles. She was among the stars in the 1972 nostalgia revue Big Show of 1928, which toured the country and played New York's Madison Square Garden.

== Death ==
On March 22, 1975, alone in her apartment, the 59-year-old comedian apparently fell and landed on her glass-top coffee table. A shard of glass jammed into her throat and she bled to death before her husband came home and discovered her.

== Legacy ==
For her contribution to the television and radio industry, Daley has two stars on the Hollywood Walk of Fame at 6303 Hollywood Blvd. Daley is buried next to a tree along the roadside in the north end of Section 8 (the new Garden of Legends), at Hollywood Forever Cemetery in Hollywood, California.

== Filmography ==
Film
Year	Title	Role	Notes
1942	The Fleet's In	Cissie	
1942	Star Spangled Rhythm	Mimi	
1943	Crazy House	Herself / Sadie Silverfish	
1943	Riding High	Tess Connors	
1945	Out of This World	Fanny (drummer)	
1945	Duffy's Tavern	Herself	
1945	Screen Snapshots: Radio Shows	Herself - The Sunday Bandwagon Program	Short
1946	Unusual Occupations	Herself	Short, Uncredited
1947	Ladies' Man	Geraldine Ryan	
1947	Variety Girl	Herself	
1951	Here Comes the Groom	Herself	Uncredited
1954	Red Garters	Minnie Redwing	
1967	The Spirit Is Willing	Felicity Twitchell	
1970	The Phynx	Herself	
1970	Norwood	Mrs. Remley	(final role)
Television
Year	Title	Role	Notes
1950	The Jack Carter Show	Herself	1 episode
1950	The Ed Wynn Show	Herself	1 episode
1952	Stars in Their Eye	Herself	1 episode
1954	The Bob Hope Specials	Herself	1 episode
1955	The Jimmy Durante Show	Herself	1 episode
1964	Bob Hope Presents the Chrysler Theatre	Patsy Willis	1 episode

== Discography ==
Year	Title	Charts	Sales
1940	It's the Last Time I'll Fall in Love/ Where Were You Last Night?	-	-
1946	Put the Blame on Mame/ The Truth of the Matter Is	-	150.000
1946	Mama's Gone, Goodbye/ That's the Beginning of the End	-	-
1947	Fightin' Love/ Grandma Teeter Totter (With Hoagy Carmichael)	-	-
1949	Kiss Me Sweet/ It's a Cruel, Cruel World	-	-
1949	A Good Man Is Hard to Find/ All Right, Louie, Drop the Gun	-	500.000
1950	Louisville Lou/ Mister Honkey Tonk	-	-
1950	The Old Piano Roll Blues/ Stay with the Happy People (With Hoagy Carmichael)	#11	-
1950	We Get Along So Good Together/ The One That I Want Won't Have Me (With Buz Butler)	-	-
1951	I'm Waiting Just for You/ Woman Is a Five Letter Word (With Hoagy Carmichael)	-	-
1951	Aba Daba Honeymoon/ Golden Rocket (With Hoagy Carmichael)	#23	-
1953	The Call of the Wild/ These Are the Things I Remember	-	-
