= Sidney Rankin Drew =

American actor (1891–1918)

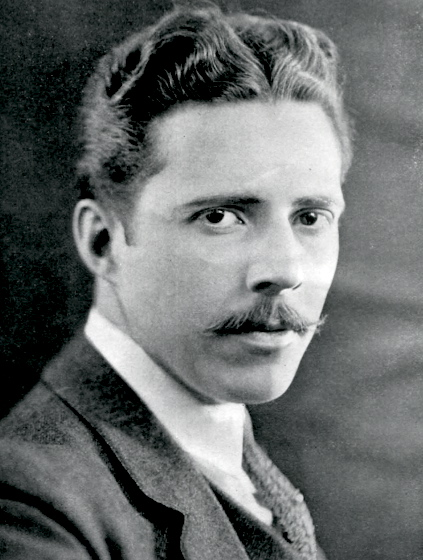
- Born: Sidney Rankin Drew; September 19, 1891; New York City, United States
- Died: May 19, 1918 (aged 26); Arvillers, France
- Cause of death: Killed in action
- Other name: S. Rankin Drew
- Occupations: Actor, film director
- Years active: 1913–1917
- Parents: Sidney Drew (father); Gladys Rankin (mother)
- Relatives: Lucille McVey (step-mother); Louisa Lane Drew (grandmother); McKee Rankin (grandfather); Kitty Blanchard (grandmother)
- Family: Drew family Rankin family

Sidney Rankin Drew (September 19, 1891 – May 19, 1918) was an American actor and film director. He was a member of the multi-generational Drew acting family.

He appeared in 36 films between 1913 and 1917, and directed 14 films between 1915 and 1917.

== Early life ==
Sidney Rankin Drew was born on September 19, 1891, in New York City to Sidney Drew and Gladys Rankin, both actors and comedians of Mr and Mrs. Sidney Drew. Drew was born into two entertainment family dynasties, the Drews and the Rankins. Through his father, his grandmother was actress Louisa Lane Drew and through his mother, his grandparents were McKee Rankin and Kitty Blanchard, all actors. He was the first cousin of the actors John, Lionel, and Ethel Barrymore, all of the Barrymore acting family. Drew was also cousin to actors Louise Drew, Georgie Drew Mendum, and Arthur Rankin.

Drew graduation from the Cutler School in New York.

== Career ==
Drew began his career acting in his parents' vaudeville acts. He first appeared on stage in Minneapolis at just four months old. He would later make his official theatre debut in the play Billy written by his mother and followed this up with his father's Silent Voice. It was through the encouragement of his cousin, Lionel Barrymore, that Drew began to work in the newly developing film industry.

In 1916, Drew directed Thou Art the Man, the last script written by his mother on her deathbed. He regarded the film as a masterpiece and a tribute to his mother who had died in 1914. He also directed the silent picture The Vital Question the same year. It starred Virginia Pearson, Charles Kent, George Cooper, and Denton Vane. Following its release the Grand Forks Herald named Drew "one of the greatest directors in the business".

After a successful career with Vitagraph, Drew moved to Metro Pictures in 1916, becoming the fifth of the Barrymore/Drew to work at the studio. His first, and last, film at Metro was The Belle of the Season, which was shot in 1916, but released posthumously in 1918.

Drew was drafted in the Army during World War I and eventually became a volunteer pilot in the Franco-American Air Corps. He was killed-in-action in 1918. In 1921, the book Life and Letters of Sidney Rankin Drew was edited and published by his step-mother, Lucille McVey. The book is made up prodominently of letters he sent home to his father during the war.

== Personal life and death ==
Rankin's mother, Gladys, died in January 1914 from undisclosed causes. His father remarried to Lucille McVey, a Vitagraph scriptwriter who briefly went under the name Jane Morrow, in July that year.

Drew was killed-in-action on May 19, 1918, when his plane was shot down over France during World War I. He has a monument in Central Park. A cross made from the struts of his airplane was presented to his step-mother, Lucille McVey, in December 1919. She dedicated the cross to his monument.

== Filmography ==
- The Still Voice (1913)*short
- His Tired Uncle (1913)*short
- An Infernal Tangle (1913)*short
- The Snare of Fate (1913)*short
- An Unwritten Chapter (1913)*short
- The Glove (1913)*short
- My Lady of Idleness (1913)*short
- The Penalties of Reputation (1913)*short
- A Game of Cards (1913)*short
- Timing Cupid (1914)*short
- Hearts of Women (1914)*short
- Marrying Sue (1914)*short
- In the Old Attic (1914)*short
- The Drudge (1914)*short
- The Idler (1914)*short
- Never Again (1914)*short
- Mr. Barnes of New York (1914, actor)
- The Tattoo Mark (1914)*short
- Maria's Sacrifice (1914)*short
- The Royal Wild West (1914)*short
- In the Latin Quarter (1915, actor)*short
- O'Garry of the Royal Mounted (1915)*short
- The Island of Regeneration (1915)*feature
- The Quality of Mercy (1915)*short
- A Madcap Adventure (1915)*short
- Janet of the Chorus (1915)*short
- Elsa's Brother (1915)*short
- The Lesson of the Narrow Street (1915)*short
- The Reward (1915)*short
- The Third Party (1915)*short
- Who Killed Joe Merrion? (1915)*feature
- Thou Art the Man (1915)*feature
- The Hunted Woman (1916)*feature
- The Suspect (1916, director and actor)*feature
- The Musical Barber (1916)*short
- A Vampire Out of Work (1916)
- The Girl Philippa (1917, director and actor)*feature
- Who's Your Neighbor? (1917, director)*feature
- The Belle of the Season (released 1919 although shot in 1917, director, scenario, and actor)*feature

== Director ==
- What's Ours? (1915)*short
- Love's Way (1915)*short
- The Lesson of the Narrow Street (1915)*short
- The Reward (1915)*short
- Thou Art the Man (1915)*feature
- Kennedy Square (1916)*feature
- The Hunted Woman (1916)*feature
- The Vital Question (1916)*feature
- The Suspect (1916)*feature
- The Daring of Diana (1916)*feature
- A Vampire Out of Work (1916)*feature
- The Girl Philippa (1916)*feature
- The Belle of the Season (1917)*feature (not released until 1919)
- Who's Your Neighbor? (1917)*feature

== See also ==
- Barrymore family
