= A Vampire Out of Work =

- Directed by: S. Rankin Drew
- Written by: Tom Bret; Frank Lawrence
- Produced by: Vitagraph Company of America
- Starring: Josephine Earle
- Distributed by: General Film Company
- Release date: October 6, 1916
- Running time: 1 reel
- Country: USA
- Language: Silent..English titles

A Vampire OUt of Work is a lost 1916 silent short comedy film directed by S. Rankin Drew and starring Josephine Earle. It was produced by The Vitagraph Company of America and distributed by General Film Company.

== Cast ==
- Josephine Earle as Theodora Bareback
