= The Plunger =

1920 film directed by Dell Henderson

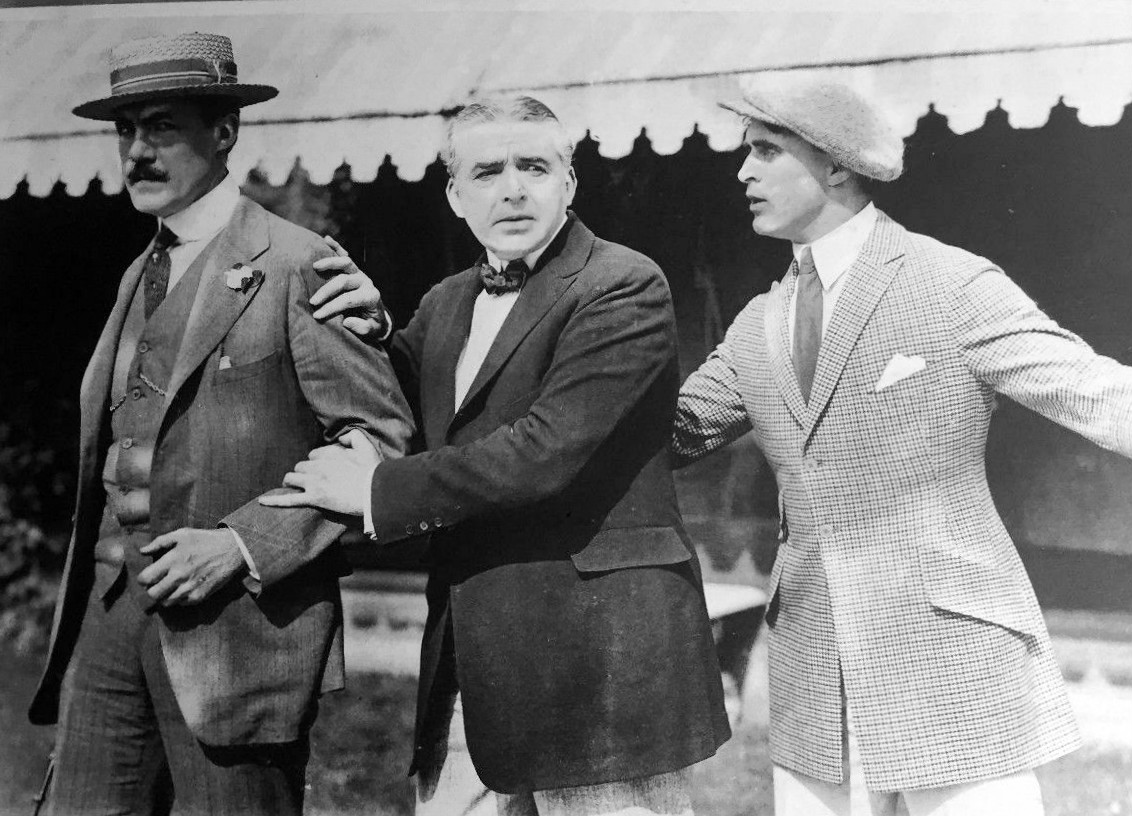
- Directed by: Dell Henderson
- Written by: Thomas F. Fallon
- Produced by: William Fox
- Starring: George Walsh; Virginia Valli; Richard Neill
- Cinematography: Charles E. Gilson
- Production company: Fox Film Corporation
- Distributed by: Fox Film Corporation
- Release date: November 7, 1920
- Running time: 50 minutes
- Country: United States
- Languages: Silent; English intertitles

The Plunger is a 1920 American silent drama film directed by Dell Henderson and starring George Walsh, Virginia Valli and Richard Neill.

== Cast ==
- George Walsh as 'Take a Chance' Schuyler
- Virginia Valli as Alice Houghton
- Byron Douglas as John Houghton
- Richard Neill as Norman Yates
- Edward Boulden as Jimmie Mullin
- Inez Shannon as Mrs. Mullin
- Irving Brooks as Beggs
- Robert Vivian as Dobbins
- W. S. Harkins as Richard Dodge

== Bibliography ==
- Connelly, Robert B. The Silents: Silent Feature Films, 1910-36, Volume 40, Issue 2. December Press, 1998.
- Munden, Kenneth White. The American Film Institute Catalog of Motion Pictures Produced in the United States, Part 1. University of California Press, 1997.
- Solomon, Aubrey. The Fox Film Corporation, 1915-1935: A History and Filmography. McFarland, 2011.
