= The Frank Morgan Show =

American old-time radio variety program

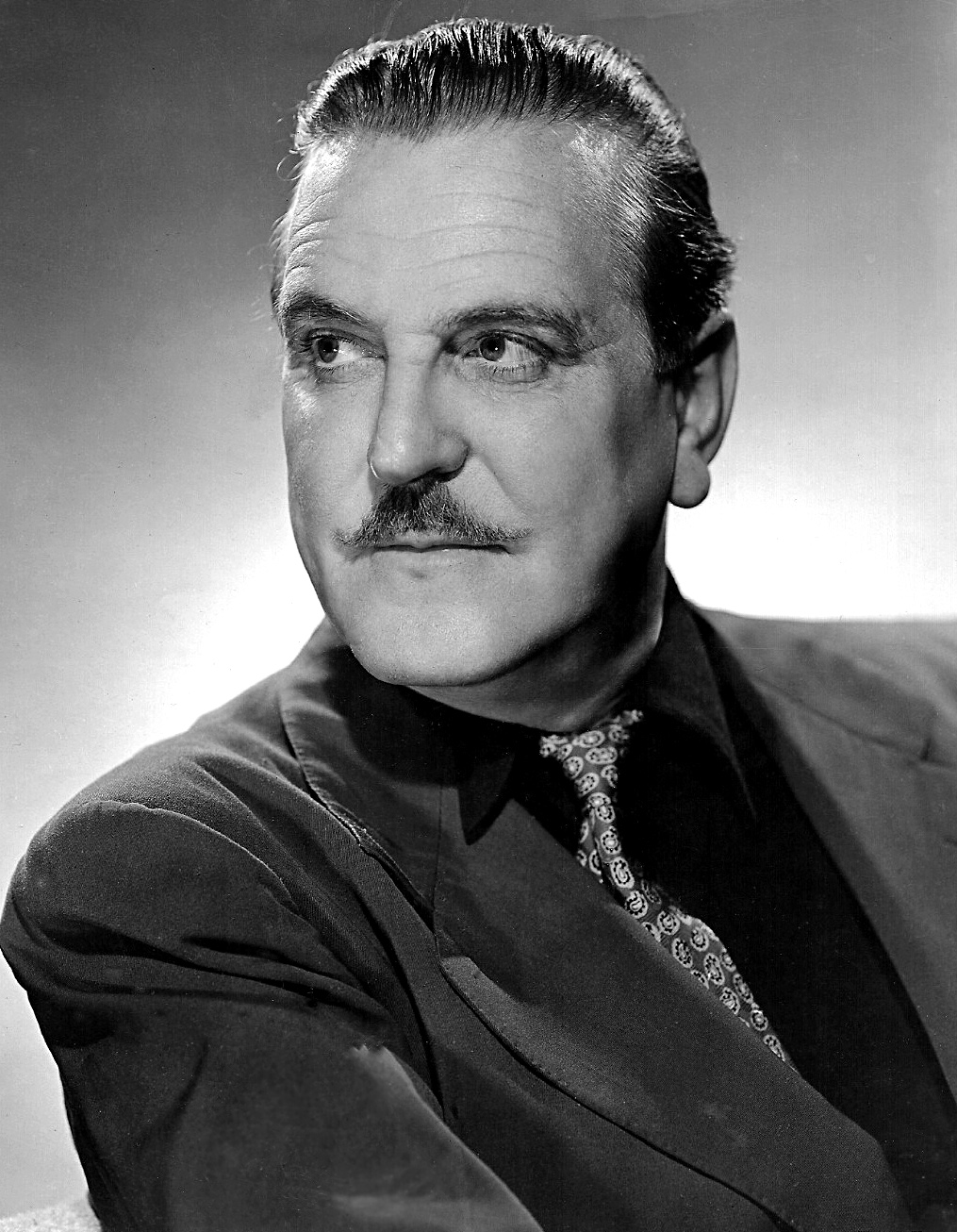
- Frank Morgan
- Genre: Variety
- Running time: 30 minutes
- Country of origin: United States
- Language(s): English
- Syndicates: NBC
- Hosted by: Robert Young
- Starring: Frank Morgan; Cass Daley; Eric Blore
- Announcer: Harlow Wilcox
- Original release: August 31, 1944 – May 31, 1945
- Sponsored by: Maxwell House coffee

The Frank Morgan Show is an American old-time radio variety program. It was broadcast on NBC from August 31, 1944, to May 31, 1945. It was described in a contemporary trade publication as "one of the highest priced programs on the air."

== Format ==
The Frank Morgan Show grew out of a previous program, Maxwell House Coffee Time, which featured Frank Morgan and Fanny Brice and ran from 1940 to 1944. Brice left that program for her own, The Baby Snooks Show (based on the "Baby Snooks" character that she had used for skits on the previous program).The sponsor, Maxwell House coffee, chose to proceed with a program starring Morgan, a comedian who specialized in telling fantastic stories. In the old-time radio reference book Tune in Yesterday, John Dunning wrote, "Morgan without Snooks lost a huge piece of rating", which led to the show's lasting only one season with Morgan as the solo star.

== Personnel ==
A story published in the trade publication Billboard shortly before the show premiered speculated that Morgan's program would probably be second only to The Jack Benny Program in terms of how much each episode would cost to produce. At that time, the Benny program cost $22,500. The magazine said that experts in the field were predicting the cost of Morgan's talent would be nearly that much.

Besides Morgan, Cass Daley and Eric Blore were featured performers, and Robert Young was the master of ceremonies. Carlos Ramirez was the singer, Albert Stack led the orchestra, and Harlow Wilcox was the announcer.
