= Walter Hitchcock =

American actor (1872–1917)

Walter Edwin Hitchcock (1872 – June 23, 1917) was an American actor. He appeared on stage, in silent films, and had several leading roles.

== Career ==
Hitchcock was born in 1872 in Malden, Massachusetts or New Castle, Maine. In his youth, Hitchcock acted in amateur theatricals.

He eventually moved on to becoming an actor in many silent films. Variety called his performance in The Idler (1915) "very good, indeed". He was known for his role in The Auction Block (1917).

In 1916, his maid discovered some fake money in his hotel room that he had taken from the set of The House of Tears (1915). It was reported to federal agents, who investigated and "enjoyed a good laugh".

Hitchcock died on June 23, 1917, at Hotel Somerset in New York City of heart failure.

== Personal life ==
He married fellow actress Donna Barrell, also known as Teresa Michelene. Michelene was with him at the time of his death.

== Filmography ==
- Uncle Tom's Cabin (1914), as George Shelby
- The Walls of Jericho (1914)
- Life's Shop Window (1914), as Eustace Pelham
- Destiny: Or, The Soul of a Woman (1915) as The Connoisseur
- The House of Tears (1915), as Henry Thorne
- The Climbers (1915), as Dick Sterling
- The Celebrated Scandal (1915), as Don Severo
- The Snowbird (1916), as Michael Flynn
- The Libertine (1916) as Charlie Grigg
- The White Raven (1917), as John Blaisdell
- Vera, the Medium (1917), as Herbert Carlton
- The Auction Block (1917)
- The Belle of the Season (1919), as Clifton Brophy
