= The Sacred Mirror of Kofun =

1996 video game

- Developers: Enteractive, Inc., Future Concepts
- Publisher: Enteractive, Inc.
- Platform: Microsoft Windows
- Release: NA: 1996
- Genre: Puzzle game/Digital encyclopedia
- Mode: Single-player

The Sacred Mirror of Kofun is a 1996 puzzle video game/multimedia encyclopedia co-produced by Jean-Michel Cousteau with the cooperation of the National Center of Cinematography and the moving image and the French Ministry of Economy, Finances and Industry. It features full motion video sequences and actual underwater footage, the first game to do so.

== Plot ==
The game is set in 1999 (three years into the future) on the Antares, a futuristic nautical research lab which sails off from Honolulu.

The player character is Chris Young, a former racecar driver and Gulf War pilot, who was hired by Cousteau because of his interest in marine technology, to pilot the Antares and find the ideal location to launch the Poseidon research lab.

Early in the game, the player receive a videophone message from Steve Grant of the "Worldwide Heritage Foundation". Archeologist John Braddy was after a sacred Japanese mirror of the Kofun period which belonged to a Japanese warlord Ishuta who led the Yamato armies to fend off invaders from the Kinai plains. The mirror was given to him as a talisman by his wife, Maiko. It was said that its reflection helped him defeat his enemies and afterwards his victory was engraved on the mirror. After his death, it was buried in his kofun (tomb). Fifty years after World War II, an ancient document came to light which established the mirror's historicity. Grant had failed to find the mirror but Braddy found Ishuta's lost tomb.

The player has to navigate the Antares to the wrecks and reefs of the West Pacific and the Palau Archipelago, explore islands, gather clues and combine them using the database of EDWARD to unfold more clues. The educational portion of the game includes scuba diving with the aid of the Angel Shark diver propulsion vehicle, taking photographs of the sea fauna and then cataloguing them to EDWARD. The player is additionally tasked to locate Braddy.

=== Characters ===
There are several characters the player can interact with, mainly from the ship's intercom.

- Jean-Michel Cousteau - In the game, Cousteau was given the responsibility by the "International Scientific Committee" to produce several programs in order to evaluate the health of planet Earth.
- Steve Grant (Nat Benchley) - The head of the "International Scientific Committee" and board member of the influential "Worldwide Heritage Foundation". With Cousteau he studies the global environmental trends and their effects on the coral reefs. He is also interested in finding Ishuta's mirror and after he failed, he sent Braddy after it.
- EDWARD (Jon Radulovic) - An Artificial Intelligence created by Dr. Paul Sinus, who runs the Antares and also the interface of its mainframe. EDWARD stands for the words Encyclopedia-Database-WorldNet-Album-Reports-Disconnect. EDWARD also contains Jean-Michel Cousteau's Encyclopedia of the Sea built into, with information on underwater ecology, fauna, the geography and history of Micronesia, and the actual Japanese ships that sunk in the Chuuk Lagoon, including tonnage, dimensions and blueprints.
- Luciana Capucci (Faby Schneider) - An Italian specialist in underwater biology. She is on board the Antares to help the player locate the ideal spot for the Poseidon.
- Paul Sinus (John Gallagher) - A scientist introduced by Cousteau to the team, the inventor of the Poseidon, the Antares, the Angel Shark and EDWARD. His main duty is to keep the high tech equipment aboard the ship working
- Ann Fong (Valentine Zhou) - A Chinese historian, expert in ancient Japanese legends. She is the last to join the crew early in the game, as soon as the fate of Braddy is known.
- John Braddy (Ian Marshall) - The scientist who looked for the Sacred Mirror and was lost.

== Gameplay ==
The interface of the game is that of a typical first person point-and-click puzzle adventure game. The player explores environments depicted through a large series of computer generated stills, using mouse clicks for movement or to manipulate objects within reach. Environments include the CGI sections and corridors of the Antares or natural environment exploration on the islands, generated by actual photographs.

Antares
On the Antares the player can visit several locations and stations, including his cabin, the bridge, where he can plot course to new destinations to the automap, access EDWARD, or talk to the crew through the communications station. Movement is done by clicking on the environment or directly on the desired destination on the ship's layout. At the hangar it's possible to perform a dive with an Angel Shark, or the Inflatable boat to access an island.
Dives
When the player dives, the screen changes into the control of an Angel Shark. The dive is actually a full motion video; similar to a rail shooter, the player has to pay attention and click on hotspots in order to take photographs. Although these sequences have no interactivity, at some points the player has the opportunity to select a branch of the route. Whenever the oxygen tank reserve nears the end, the player can return to the ship and repeat the dive from the latest branch point.
According to the location and the objectives, the photographs taken are either of sea fauna (for the studies of Dr. Capucci) or of the Japanese shipwrecks, gathering clues about the Mirror.
Exploration
At several points of the adventure, the player disembarks on the islands of Eten, Peleliu and Angaur. The player explores the environment (the backgrounds are scanned photographs), takes photographs of clues (the available film is limited to 18) and solves some inventory-based puzzles in order to advance further. The photographs are taken to EDWARD for further analysis.
EDWARD
Much of the game action takes place on EDWARD. The mainframe contains Cousteau's encyclopedia, stores data and photographs and gives access to the WorldNet. On EDWARD, the player has to sort out the underwater photographs to aid Dr. Capucci's studies. EDWARD also analyses photographs and other data to help determine the fate of the Mirror and the whereabouts of Dr. Braddy. The player also can "search" the Net by using a combination of several gathered keywords; the results are often text with new clues, new photographs or new keywords. There are also some mind puzzles that must be solved, in order to help EDWARD decipher e.g. some obscure writing and so on.

== Production ==
The game was produced by Paris-based Future Concepts, a subsidiary of IDP. It was envisioned as the first part of an edutainment multimedia title series under the name The Interactive Adventures of Jean-Michel Cousteau. Cousteau was excited by the possibilities of interactive CD-ROM technology which would not only help his work reach young people, but allow them to participate.

Pre-production begun in early 1995, and development and design took place in Paris, simultaneously with filming. The project cost roughly 8 million French francs.

The virtual setting of the ship Antares was designed with Cousteau's naval officer as a consultant. According to Cousteau, a ship like the Antares might become reality in the future.

=== Filming and scripting ===
In summer, a team consisting of oceanographers, photographers and a scriptwriter, led by Cousteau, transported equipment from Los Angeles to Chuuk Atoll, Micronesia. Production lasted several weeks (one in Chuuk and 2 in Palau) during which they took several photographs and video footage around the island and the ocean; Cousteau and his team performed 4-5 dives a day.

A location featured prominently was the Chuuk Lagoon, famous for the more than 100 shipwrecks that sunk during Operation Hailstone of the WWII. The project was marked when one torpedo, whose compressed air container of its propulsion system had rusted away, and exploded while the team were down.

The plot was written simultaneously with the brainstorming and the reviewing and selection of the footage.

=== Marketing ===
Since the game play was weak by gamers standards special care was given to advertising which encompassed several media and highlight Cousteau's name and participation.

Development problems encountered in late testing resulted in release delays, so the game was released in late November, after the hype subsided.

== Package ==
The game package included a demo CD, a 3.5 inch floppy with Saved Games, an Evaluation Guide, and an overview brochure in the form of a passport.

== Reception ==
Despite an ambitious project, the game was not well received and passed rather unnoticed, mostly because of its limited or buggy gameplay. There are currently very few reviews on the game.

The Sacred Mirror of Kofun received a CODiE award in 1997 for Best Use of Live Performers in Multimedia.

== Sequels ==
The game was envisioned as the first title of The Interactive Adventures of Jean-Michel Cousteau series. Shortly after the production of the game, and according to its success and financial backing, Cousteau considered a new interactive adventure in the freshwater caves of Yucatan and the blue holes of Belize, however such plans did not come to fruition.
