= Nat Benchley =

American writer and actor

- Benchley as Det. Augie Polk on HBO's The Wire
- Born: Nathaniel Robert Benchley
- Education: Stanford University
- Occupation: Actor
- Father: Nathaniel Benchley
- Relatives: Robert Benchley (grandfather); Peter Benchley (brother)

Nathaniel Robert Benchley is an American actor who has performed for stage, television, and cinema.

== Early life and education ==
Benchley is the son of Nathaniel Benchley, an author, and Marjorie (Bradford). He is the grandson of humorist Robert Benchley, a founding member of the Algonquin Round Table. He is the brother of author Peter Benchley, who authored the novel Jaws. He is a graduate of The Choate School and Stanford University.

== Career ==
Benchley served in the United States Navy and was assigned to the Naval Security Group during the Vietnam War. He later worked for a public television station in Washington, D.C. During the early-1970s, he wrote and acted in an anti-shoplifting film for the Florida Attorney General's office titled "High Pockets At Full Noon". In 1999, he wrote a script for the FBI National Academy explaining their multi-national networking program.

Since 1996, Benchley has been performing a show named Benchley Despite Himself, which he describes as "a compilation of Robert Benchley's best monologues, short films, radio rantings and pithy pieces as recalled, edited, and acted by his grandson, and combined with family reminiscences and friends' perspectives". He has performed it in Washington, D.C.; New York, New York; Boston, Massachusetts; and other locations. The Washington Post termed it "an engaging work that breaks with the usual conventions of one-man plays. Rather than inhabit the character of Robert Benchley the entire evening, Nat Benchley blends his own observations with re-creations of the routines and sketches that made his grandfather famous. The effect is at once seductive and distancing, perhaps a bit like Robert Benchley, whose humor often obscured his unhappiness."

He has recorded two CDs of Robert Benchley's monologues, Benchley On Benchley, Volumes 1 & 2. He also does narration work for commercials and television documentaries for the National Geographic Channel and the Discovery Channel.

His movies include Diner, Broadcast News, and Home for the Holidays. He also had a continuing character role as Det. Augustus Polk in HBO's television series The Wire.

In 1988, he created the title role of "Church Key Charlie Blue" in Jim Lehrer's play. That same year, he and co-actor Bill Grimmette were nominated for a Helen Hayes Award for their performances in Athol Fugard's show "The Blood Knot".

During the 1990s, Benchley revived two Peter Cook and Dudley Moore stage productions, Beyond the Fringe and Good Evening in the Washington, D.C., area. He also appeared as a character of the 1996 video game The Sacred Mirror of Kofun.

From the early 1980s to the early 2000s, he was an officer of the Screen Actors Guild's Washington/Baltimore division. He served as vice-president, president and national board member.

In 2009, he and co-editor Kevin C. Fitzpatrick published "The Lost Algonquin Round Table", a collection of early writings by his grandfather Robert Benchley and other members of the fabled New York literary gang. In 2011, he recorded audio versions of four of his father's children's books for the HarperCollins "I Can Read" series.

== Filmography ==
=== Film ===
| Year | Title | Role | Notes |
|---|---|---|---|
| 1982 | Diner | Technical Director | |
| 1987 | Broadcast News | Commander | |
| 1989 | Her Alibi | Prosecutor | |
| 1989 | Chances Are | Marshall | |
| 1994 | Serial Mom | Macho Man | |
| 1995 | Home for the Holidays | Airport Cop | |
| 1998 | Species II | Squad Leader | |
| 2000 | Cecil B. Demented | Swat Cop A | |
| 2009 | State of Play | Junior Detective #2 | |

=== Television ===
| Year | Title | Role | Notes |
|---|---|---|---|
| 1983 | Kennedy | FBI Agent | 5 episodes |
| 1987 | The Ryan White Story | David Rosselot | Television film |
| 1998, 1999 | Homicide: Life on the Street | Bartender | 2 episodes |
| 2002–2008 | The Wire | Det. Augustus Polk | 8 episodes |
| 2004 | Something the Lord Made | Karsh | Television film |
