= The Suspect (1916 film) =

1916 film

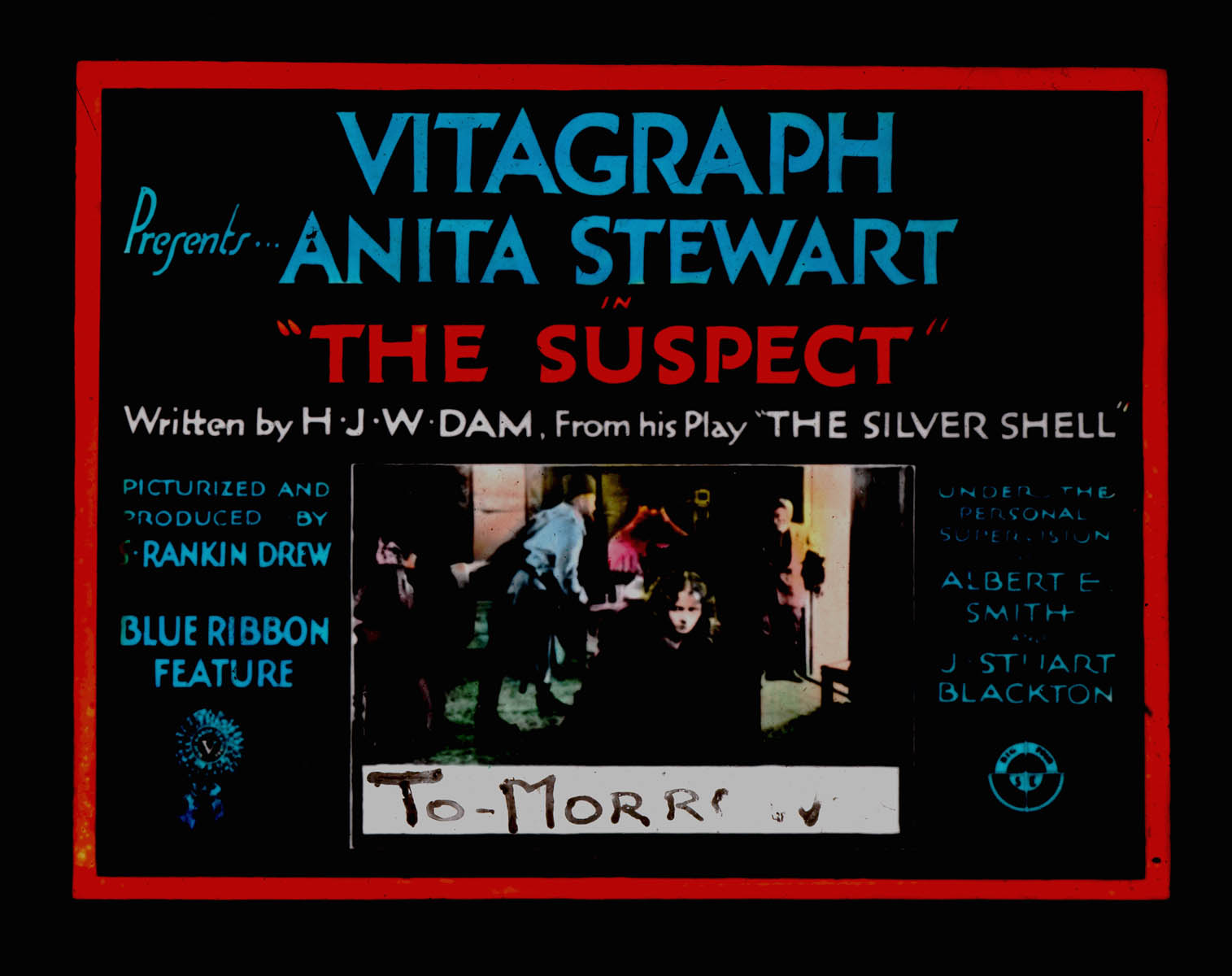
- Glass slide for the film
- Directed by: S. Rankin Drew
- Written by: S. Rankin Drew (scenario)
- Based on: The Silver Shell by H. J. W. Dam
- Produced by: Vitagraph Studios
- Starring: Anita Stewart
- Cinematography: Arthur Quinn
- Production company: Vitagraph Studios
- Distributed by: V-L-S-E
- Release date: May 22, 1916
- Running time: 6 reels
- Country: United States
- Language: Silent (English intertitles)

The Suspect is a 1916 American silent drama film directed by S. Rankin Drew, starring Anita Stewart and produced by the Vitagraph Studios. The film marked Frank Morgan’s film debut.

== Cast ==
- Anita Stewart as Sophie Karrenina
- S. Rankin Drew as Prince Paul Karatoff
- Anders Randolf as Duke Karatoff
- George Cooper as Valdor
- Frank Morgan as Sir Richard
- Edward Elkas as Mouroff
- Julia Swayne Gordon as Lady Armitage
- Bobby Connelly as Jack
- Alfred Raboch as Ralk (credited as Albert Raboch)
- Ann Brody as Mouroff's wife

== Preservation ==
With no prints of The Suspect located in any film archives, it is a lost film.
