= The Spirit Is Willing =

1967 film by William Castle

- Theatrical release poster
- Directed by: William Castle
- Screenplay by: Ben Starr
- Based on: The Visitors by Nathaniel Benchley
- Produced by: William Castle
- Starring: Sid Caesar; Vera Miles; Barry Gordon; John McGiver; Cass Daley; Ricky Cordell; Mary Wickes
- Cinematography: Harold E. Stine
- Edited by: Edwin H. Bryant
- Music by: Vic Mizzy
- Production company: William Castle Productions
- Distributed by: Paramount Pictures
- Release date: July 1967
- Running time: 100 minutes
- Country: United States
- Language: English

The Spirit Is Willing is a 1967 American horror comedy film directed by William Castle, written by Ben Starr, and starring Sid Caesar, Vera Miles, Barry Gordon, John McGiver, Cass Daley, Ricky Cordell and Mary Wickes. Based on The Visitors by Nathaniel Benchley, it was released in July 1967, by Paramount Pictures.

== Plot ==
Ben and Kate Powell rent a haunted New England house by the sea. There, their son Steve cops the blame for mayhem caused by the pranks of three mischievous ghosts. Soon after their arrival, a series of strange and increasingly destructive occurrences begin to happen. Not believing in poltergeists, the puzzled parents immediately suspect their son. The real perpetrators are a trio of angry ghosts who want the cabin all to themselves.

When the mortal family refuses to move, the ghostly trio (two women and a man) sink two boats belonging to the couples' wealthy uncle. Once again, the poor boy is blamed and this nearly drives him insane for he can see the ghosts. More trouble follows when one of the lady spirits falls in love with the uncle.

== Cast ==
- Sid Caesar as Ben Powell
- Vera Miles as Kate Powell
- Barry Gordon as Steve Powell
- John McGiver as Uncle George
- Cass Daley as Felicity Twitchell
- Ricky Cordell as Miles Thorpe
- Mary Wickes as Gloria Tritt
- Jesse White as Fess Dorple
- Robert Donner as Ebenezer Twitchell
- Mickey Deems as Rabbit Warren
- Nestor Paiva as Felicity's Father
- Doodles Weaver as Booper Mellish
- Jay C. Flippen as Mother
- Jill Townsend as Jenny Pruitt / Priscilla Weems / Carol Weems
- John Astin as Dr. Frieden
- William Castle as Mr. Hymer
- Byron Foulger as Drug Store Owner
- Harvey Lembeck as Captain Pederson

== See also ==
- List of American films of 1967
