= The Affairs of Cellini =

1934 film by Gregory La Cava

- Fay Wray and Fredric March in a scene from the film
- Directed by: Gregory La Cava
- Written by: Bess Meredyth
- Based on: The Firebrand of Florence by Edwin Justus Mayer
- Produced by: Darryl F. Zanuck; William Goetz (associate producer); Raymond Griffith (associate producer)
- Starring: Constance Bennett; Fredric March; Fay Wray; Frank Morgan
- Cinematography: Charles Rosher
- Edited by: Barbara McLean
- Music by: Alfred Newman
- Production company: Twentieth Century Pictures
- Distributed by: United Artists
- Release date: August 24, 1934
- Running time: 80 minutes
- Country: United States
- Language: English

The Affairs of Cellini is a 1934 American historical comedy film directed by Gregory La Cava and starring Frank Morgan, Constance Bennett, Fredric March, Fay Wray, and Louis Calhern. It is set in Florence. The film was adapted by Bess Meredyth from the play The Firebrand of Florence by Edwin Justus Mayer.

== Plot ==
Both the duke and duchess have an eye for beauty and other partners. The duke presently fancies a young woman who poses as an artist's model. The duchess has her eye on the famous artist, Benvenuto Cellini, who is in the palace making a set of gold plates to be used at ducal banquets. Cellini purportedly hypnotizes young women, and cuckolds the duke of Florence. The somewhat oblivious duke is loath to punish the young man because Cellini fashions gold wares for him, but throws him into the torture chamber. However, a goblet of poisoned wine solves the problem.

== Cast ==
- Constance Bennett as Duchess of Florence
- Fredric March as Benvenuto Cellini
- Frank Morgan as Alessandro, Duke of Florence
- Fay Wray as Angela
- Vince Barnett as Ascanio
- Jessie Ralph as Beatrice
- Louis Calhern as Ottaviano
- Jay Eaton as Polverino
- Paul Harvey as Emissary
- Jack Rutherford as Captain of the Guards
- Irene Ware as Daughter of the Royal House of Bocci

== Reception ==
Morgan was nominated for the Academy Award for Best Actor. It was also nominated for Best Art Direction, Best Cinematography and Best Sound, Recording (Thomas T. Moulton).

The film was a box-office disappointment for United Artists.

== MPPDA/MPAA production code of 1934 to 1968 ==
During production and distribution of the movie, MPPDA's production code took effect on every major film studio like Warner Bros. or the Walt Disney Productions. Fox Film Corporation had the first film with the MPPDA production code era with The World Moves On, released on June 28, 1934.
