= The Walls of Jericho (1914 film) =

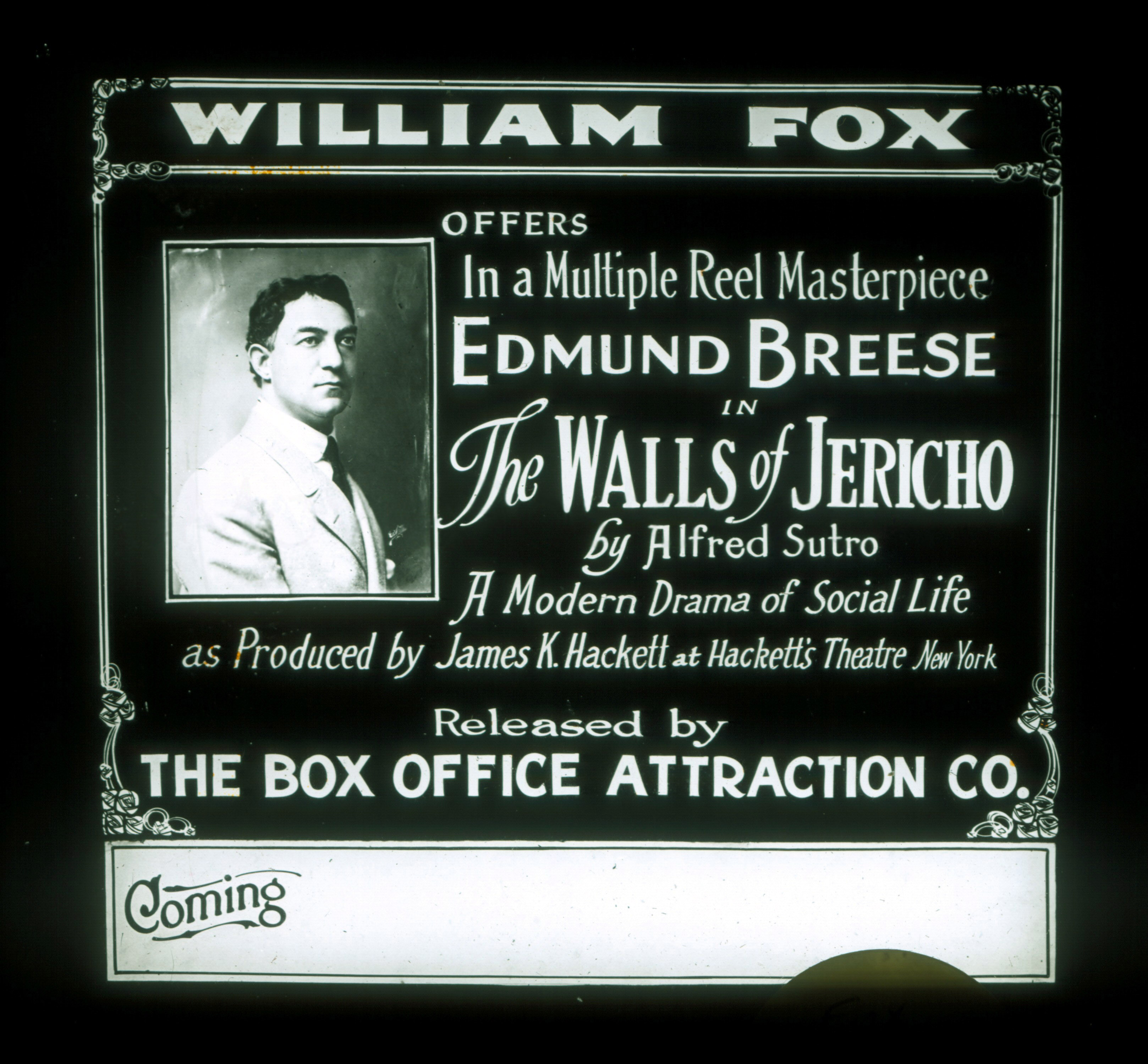
- Lantern slide.
- Directed by: Lloyd B. Carleton; James K. Hackett
- Written by: Anthony Paul Kelly (scenario); Lloyd B. Carleton (scenario)
- Based on: The Walls of Jericho by Alfred Sutro
- Starring: Edmund Breese; Claire Whitney; Walter Hitchcock; Stuart Holmes; Edward José
- Production company: Box Office Attractions Company
- Distributed by: Box Office Attractions Company
- Release date: November 19, 1914
- Running time: 5 reels
- Country: United States
- Languages: Silent film (English intertitles)

The Walls of Jericho is a lost 1914 American silent drama film directed by Lloyd B. Carleton and James K. Hackett. The film stars Edmund Breese, Claire Whitney, Walter Hitchcock, Stuart Holmes, and Edward José. It is based on the 1906 play The Walls of Jericho by Alfred Sutro. The film was released by Box Office Attractions Company on November 19, 1914.

== Plot ==
In London, Lady Althea Frobisher, prey to the demon of the game, not only loses large sums at bridge, but also lets herself be ensnared by a suitor, a profligate and libertine man who reveals to her that her husband Jack is actually a murderer wanted by the police. for killing a man in America long ago. The truth, however, is another and will come out when the detective arrives from the United States on the trail of the wanted man: the real culprit is not the husband, but her suitor. Reconciled with Jack, Althea also promises to stop playing cards.

== Cast ==
- Edmund Breese as Jack Frobisher
- Claire Whitney as Lady Althea
- Walter Hitchcock
- Stuart Holmes
- Edward José

== Preservation ==
With no holdings located in archives, The Walls of Jericho is now considered a lost film.

== See also ==
- List of lost films
- 1937 Fox vault fire
