= The Island of Regeneration =

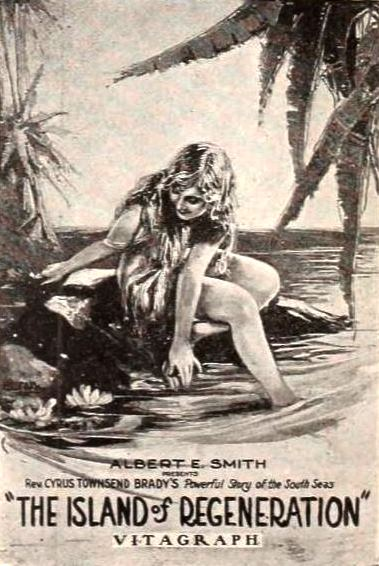
- Theatrical release poster
- Directed by: Harry Davenport
- Written by: Jasper Ewing Brady
- Based on: The Island of Regeneration: A Story of What Ought to Be by Cyrus Townsend Brady
- Produced by: J. Stuart Blackton; Albert E. Smith
- Starring: Edith Storey; Bobby Connolly; Antonio Moreno; S. Rankin Drew
- Cinematography: Thomas F. Molloy
- Production company: Vitagraph Company of America
- Distributed by: V-L-S-E Inc.
- Release date: May 17, 1915
- Running time: 6 reels
- Country: United States
- Language: Silent (English intertitles)

The Island of Regeneration is a 1915 drama film directed by Harry Davenport. It was produced by Vitagraph Studios.

== Plot ==
Katherine Brenton, a wealthy, high-spirited girl, becomes imbued with the idea that perfect platonic friendship can exist between man and woman under all conditions. Valentine Langford, a wealthy clubman and one of her converts, suggests that they put their theories to the test by taking a trip together on his yacht. In the South Pacific, the man's true character asserts itself and he attempts to seize the girl, but she escapes in the yacht's tender;eventually drifting ashore on a small island. There she is found by John Charnock, the only inhabitant, who 20 years before, a mere child had been cast away on the island. He lacks the power of speech and she realizes he is actually a man with a child's mentality. Her wishes-conveyed by sign -he obeys with dog-like devotion. She later finds some trinkets near a half-buried skeleton which convinces her to the mans identity. She immediately proceeds with his education, imbuing him with her ideals, but in the process, extending over three years, realizes she is falling in love with him. Meanwhile, back in San Francisco, Langford has set out again on his yacht to find Kate, whom he believes is still alive. An earthquake upon the island and a daring rescue by Charnock, now an educated man, bring the pair to a realization of their mutual love, which is uninterrupted until one day Kate sights a ship and lights a beacon on shore, that attracts Langford's attention. Upon landing he and Charnock nearly come to blows when the former claims the girl. Charnock’s love is shaken and Kate hides herself in a secret cave. Believing her dead, Charnock returns to the United States. Eventually, when Langford, who has found Kate, advises him to go back to the island, Charnock finds the girl of his dreams awaiting him with open arms.

== Cast ==
- Edith Storey as Katherine Brenton
- Bobby Connolly as young John Charnock Jr.
- Antonio Moreno as adult John Charnock Jr.
- S. Rankin Drew as Valentine Langford
- Leo Delaney as John Charnock Sr.
- Naomi Childers as Virginia Charnock
- Jack Brawn as Dr. Clayton
- Lillian Herbert as Phyllis Carney
- Logan Paul as Captain Harding

== Reception ==
The Houston Post gave the film a positive review. A contemporary review in Variety was also positive, calling the film a feature that "stands up on its merits".

== Preservation ==
It is not known whether the film currently survives.
