= The Girl Philippa =

1917 silent film

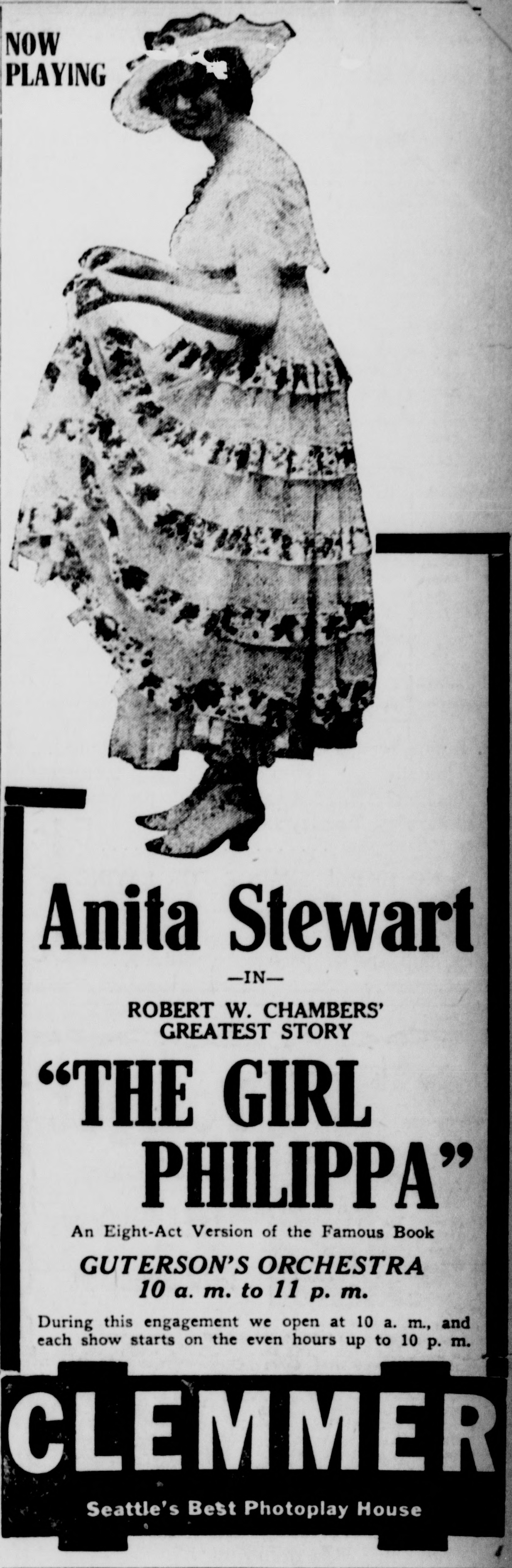
- Contemporary advertisement
- Directed by: S. Rankin Drew
- Based on: My Girl Philippa by Robert W. Chambers
- Produced by: Vitagraph Company of America; Albert E. Smith
- Starring: Anita Stewart
- Cinematography: Arthur T. Quinn
- Production company: Vitagraph Company of America
- Distributed by: Greater Vitagraph (V-L-S-E)
- Release date: January 21, 1917
- Running time: 70 minutes
- Country: United States
- Language: Silent (English intertitles)

The Girl Philippa is a 1917 American silent drama film directed by S. Rankin Drew and starring Anita Stewart. It was produced and released by the Vitagraph Company of America.

== Cast ==
- Anita Stewart as Philippa
- S. Rankin Drew as Warner
- Frank Morgan as Halkett (credited as Francis Morgan)
- Mrs. Curley as Sister Ella
- Billie Billings as The Countess
- Captain Eyerman as General Delisle
- Ned Hay as Gray
- Stanley Dunn as Schmidt
- Jules Cowles as Asticot
- Betty Young as Madame Arlone
- Lou Johnson as Esser (credited as L.S. Johnson)
- Anders Randolf as Wildresse
- Frank Crayne

== Preservation ==
With no prints of The Girl Philippa located in any film archives, it is a lost film.
