= The House of Tears =

1915 film by Edwin Carewe

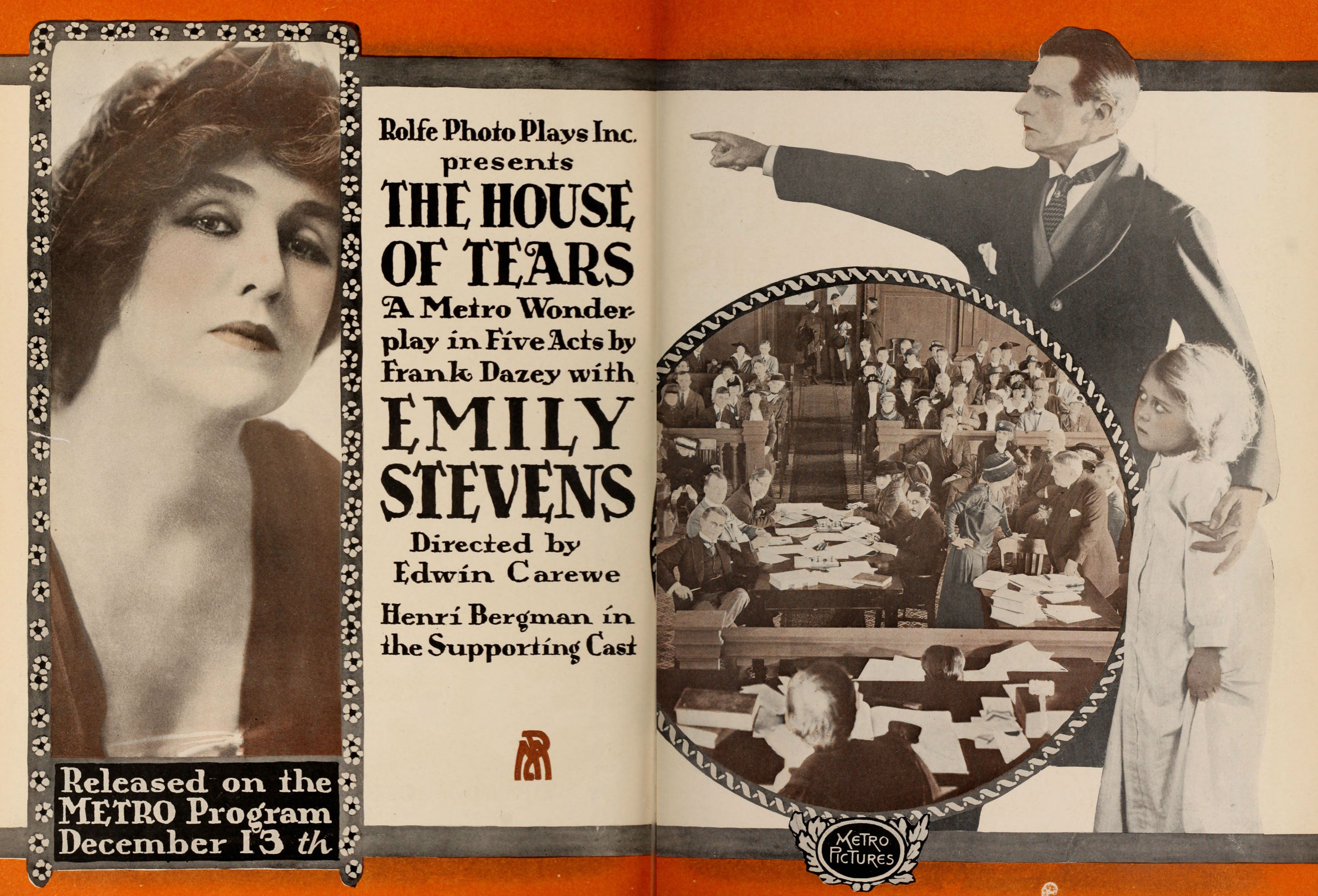
- Ad for the film in Motion Picture News
- Directed by: Edwin Carewe
- Written by: Frank Dazey
- Produced by: B. A. Rolfe
- Starring: Emily Stevens
- Production company: Rolfe Photoplays
- Distributed by: Metro Pictures
- Release date: December 13, 1915
- Language: Silent...English titles

The House of Tears is a 1915 silent film drama directed by Edwin Carewe and starring Emily Stevens who plays two roles. It was produced by B. A. Rolfe and distributed through Metro Pictures.

== Cast ==
- Emily Stevens - Mrs. Alice Collingwood / Gail Collingwood
- Henri Bergman - Robert Collingwood (*not Henry Bergman)
- Walter Hitchcock - Henry Thorne
- George Brennan - John
- Madge Tyrone - Nurse
- Bernard Randall - unknown role

== Preservation ==
With no prints of The House of Tears located in any film archives, it is considered a lost film.
