= The Fabulous Dr. Tweedy =

American radio situation comedy series (1946–1947)

The Fabulous Dr. Tweedy is an American radio situation comedy that was broadcast on NBC from June 2, 1946, through March 26, 1947.

== Premise ==
Episodes dealt with the school and home activities of Thaddeus Q. Tweedy, the absent-minded dean of men at Potts College who regularly found himself in difficulties. The show's opening narration described Tweedy as a man "who is always eager to help, but whose advice is often not helpful". More often than not, his advice resulted in chaotic situations.

Tweedy had an adopted son, Sidney, and they lived with their manservant, Welby, who had been a hobo. Miss Tilsey was the head of the school. Alexander Potts was chairman of the board of Potts College, and his daughter (Mary) was engaged to Sidney Tweedy. Colonel Beauregard Jackson was Tweedy's neighbor; Kitty Bell Jackson was the colonel's sister.

== Cast ==
Cast of The Fabulous Dr. Tweedy
Character	Actor
Thaddeus Q. Tweedy	Frank Morgan
Sidney	Harlan Stone Jr.
Mary Potts	Janet Waldo
Welby	Harry von Zell
Miss Tilsey	Nana Bryant
Alexander Potts	Gale Gordon
Beauregard Jackson	Will Wright
Kitty Bell Jackson	Sara Berner

Bud Hiestand was the announcer. Barbara Eiler frequently portrayed one of the students. Supporting actors included Eddie Green.

== Production ==
The series initially was on Sundays at 7 p.m. Eastern Time as a summer replacement for The Jack Benny Program. After September 22, 1946, it was heard on Wednesdays at 10 p.m. E. T. The fall program replaced the first half of Kay Kyser's Kollege of Musical Knowledge, which was shortened from an hour to 30 minutes. Lucky Strike was the sponsor in the summer, and Pall Mall sponsored the fall series.

Z. Wayne Griffin was the producer. Eliot Daniel directed the orchestra. Writers included Robert Riley Crutcher.

== Critical response ==
Critic Jack Gould wrote in The New York Times that The Fabulous Dr. Tweedy "is a sad item if ever there was one". Gould cited silliness and superficiality in scripts, resulting in "a half-hour of obvious confusion". He also noted that Morgan relied too much on his old-wolf characterization and that Morgan's "familiar forced laughter ... proves wearing even under the best of circumstances".

Paul Ackerman, in the trade publication Billboard, referred to the program's "so-called comical situations" and said that the October 16, 1946, episode was "singularly lacking" in laughs. Ackerman cited "a basic lack of strong comedy material" in the script, which he described as "just a routine effort" by the writers.

A review in the trade publication Variety said that Crutcher appeared to be continuing the style of writing that he used on a previous program that starred Eddie Bracken, but the results in The Fabulous Dr. Tweedy were less successful than those in Bracken's show. The review added that the Tweedy scripts seemed "to have gone overboard" in use of double entendre lines.
