= The Belle of the Season =

1919 American silent comedy-drama film, directed by S. Rankin Drew

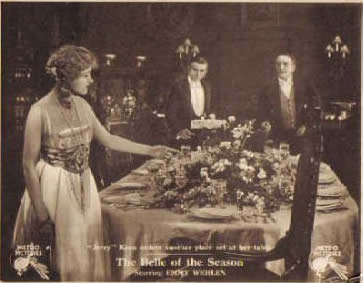
- Still from the film, Wehlen is in forefront
- Directed by: S. Rankin Drew
- Written by: S. Rankin Drew (Scenario)
- Based on: the poem, "The Belle of the Season" by Ella Wheeler Wilcox
- Produced by: B. A. Rolfe
- Starring: Emmy Wehlen; S. Rankin Drew; Walter Hitchcock
- Production company: Metro Pictures
- Release date: July 28, 1919 (US)
- Running time: 5 reels
- Country: United States
- Language: English

The Belle of the Season is a 1919 American silent comedy-drama film, directed by S. Rankin Drew, and stars Emmy Wehlen, S. Rankin Drew, and Walter Hitchcock. It was originally scheduled to be released in 1917, but its premiere was delayed until July 28, 1919.

== Plot ==
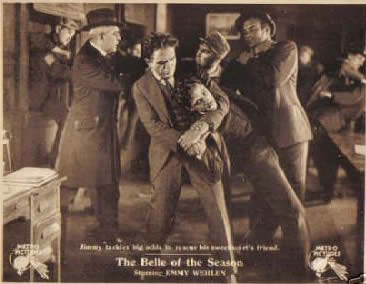
Still from the film

James Alden is the son of a rich scion, the owner of a great newspaper. When he and his father quarrel over the plight of the poor, he leaves home and goes to live and work in a settlement house. There he meets Stedman and Johnson, the first a labor leader, the latter a simple thug.

Geraldine "Jerry" Keen, known in the papers as the "Billion Dollar Baby", is a rich twenty-year-old heiress, who has just inherited her father's fortune. However, the control of the empire is in the hands of Clifton Brophy, the executor of the father's estate, until she reaches her 21st birthday. She asks Brophy to take her on a tour of her father's holdings, and is appalled by the working conditions in his mills and the living conditions in his tenements and settlement houses. When she pleads with Brophy to do something to improve the conditions, he simply refuses.

Unbeknownst to Brophy, "Jerry" disguises herself in the clothes of one of the poor, and heads back to the settlement house, where she begins to work in the evenings. While there, she meets Alden, and the two begin a romance after he comes to her rescue when she is accosted by Johnson. Eventually, Alden proposes to "Jerry", still not knowing her true identity, and the two become engaged. The day before her 21st birthday, Brophy, suspicious of her evening excursions, follows her to the settlement house. Stedmn recognizes him, after which Johnson tries to rile the occupants of the house to attack Brophy. Alden intervenes, saving Brophy, but in the skirmish he is hit in the head by a brick and taken to the hospital.

The following day "Jerry" comes of age and meets with Stedman, agreeing to his demands for improvement. When she goes to the hospital to see Alden, and tell him the good news. However, while there, Alden sees the morning paper, which shows a picture of "Jerry", and he finally understands who she is. Furious, he storms out of the hospital, grabbing a taxi. "Jerry" follows close behind, and eventually catches him, where they reconcile and move forward with their marriage.

== Cast list ==
- Emmy Wehlen as Geraldine Keen
- S. Rankin Drew as James Alden
- Walter Hitchcock as Clifton Brophy
- John Mackin as Stedman, labor leader
- Louis Wolheim as Johnson

== Production ==
The film was one of several based on the poetry of Ella Wheeler Wilcox, of which Metro owned all the rights to. The film was shot in towards the end of 1916, and was originally slated for a Spring or Summer 1917 release. However its release was delayed. The picture was shot at Metro's Rolfe Studios in New York. The film was Rankin's first with Metro, having come over from Vitagraph. In January 1917, Metro announced the film would be released on March 5, 1917. As late as March 3, the film was still scheduled for a March 5 release, however in mid-April 1918 Metro announced that the release date had been pushed back to May 13, 1918. The release was again pushed back to June 18, 1918, and then again to July 23. In early June 1919 Metro announced that the film was to be released on July 28.

== Reception ==
The Film Daily panned the film, finding virtually no redeeming quality to it. They called it one of the "more and worse" films of the year. They found fault with the production, stating that "It was tiresome, slow, confusing, unreal, uninteresting -- and about everything else uncomplimentary that could be said." They did, however, give one exemption, finding the work of Emmy Wehlen of note.

== Notes ==
This was the final film of S. Rankin Drew, who left to join the Franco-American Air Corps after production on the film wrapped. Its release was posthumous, as Rankin was killed in action in the spring of 1918.
