= Frank Morgan =

American actor (1890–1949)

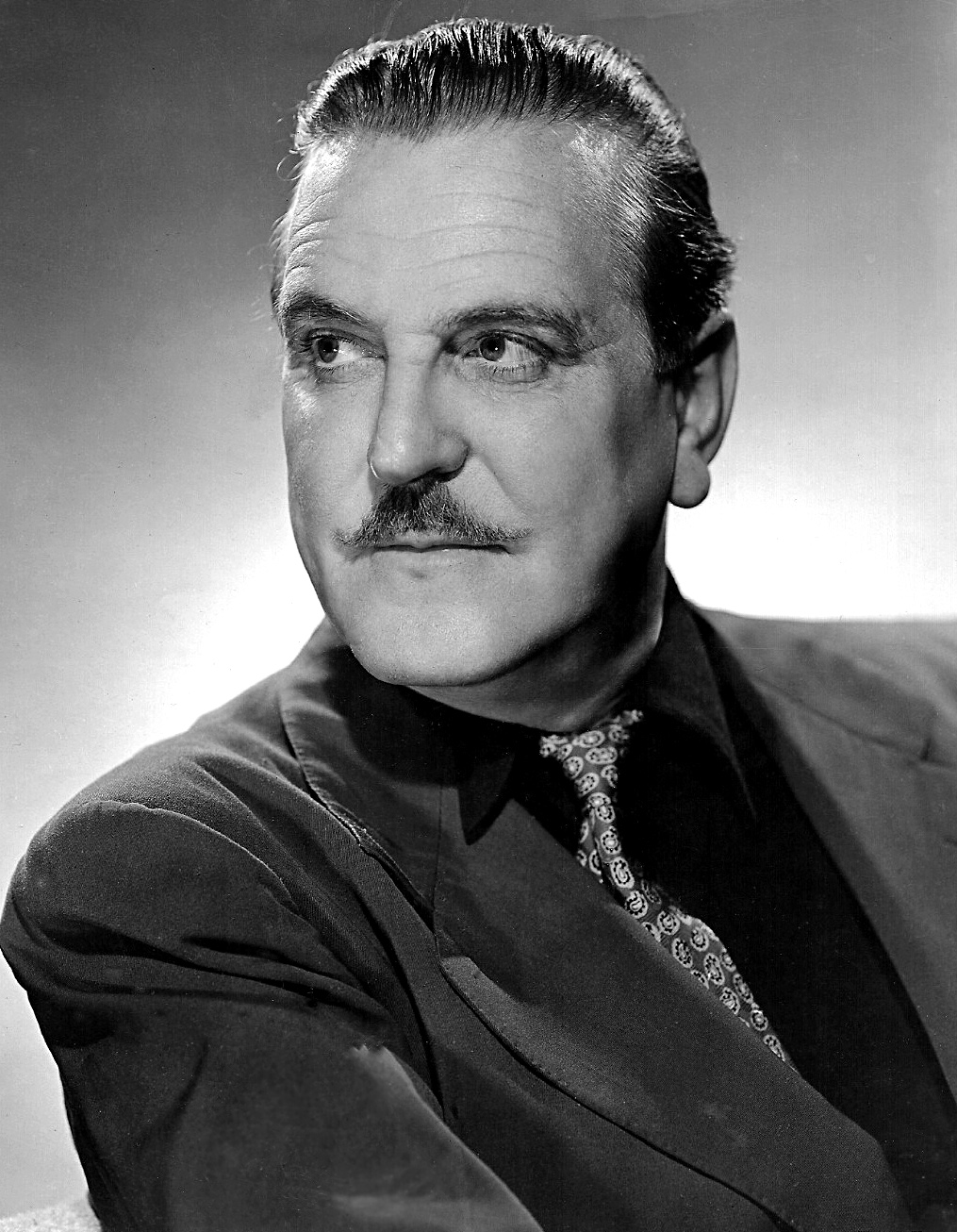
- Publicity photo, 1940s
- Born: Francis Phillip Wuppermann; June 1, 1890; New York City, U.S.
- Died: September 18, 1949 (aged 59); Beverly Hills, California, U.S.
- Resting place: Green-Wood Cemetery
- Other names: Frank Wupperman; Francis Morgan
- Education: Cornell University
- Occupations: Actor; stage performer
- Years active: 1914–1949
- Known for: The Wizard and others in MGM's The Wizard of Oz (1939)
- Spouse: Alma Muller (m. 1914)
- Children: One
- Family: Ralph Morgan (elder brother); Claudia Morgan (niece)

Francis Phillip Wuppermann (June 1, 1890 – September 18, 1949), known professionally as Frank Morgan, was an American character actor. He was best known for his appearances in films starting in the silent era in 1916, and then numerous sound films throughout the 1930s and 1940s, with a career spanning 35 years mostly as a contract player at Metro-Goldwyn-Mayer. He was also briefly billed early in his career as Frank Wupperman and Francis Morgan.

He is best-known for his multiple roles, including Professor Marvel and the title role of The Wizard, in the 1939 Metro-Goldwyn-Mayer classic The Wizard of Oz.

== Early life ==
Morgan was born on June 1, 1890, in New York City, to Josephine Wright (née Hancox) and George Diogracia Wuppermann. He was the youngest of 11 children and had five brothers and five sisters. The elder Mr. Wuppermann was born in Venezuela but was brought up in Hamburg, Germany, and was of German and Spanish ancestry. His mother was born in the United States, of English ancestry. His brother Ralph Morgan was also an actor of stage and screen. The family earned their living distributing Angostura bitters, allowing Wuppermann to attend Cornell University, where he was a member of the Phi Kappa Psi fraternity and the Glee Club.

== Career ==
=== Theater ===
Morgan began his acting career in theater. An aspiring vaudevillian following in his brother's footsteps, he changed his name from Wuppermann to Morgan. He made his acting debut in the show Mr. Wu on October 14, 1914. After many years of starring in theater productions, he finally caught the attention of critics with his role as Count Carlo Boretti in The Lullaby alongside Florence Reed. In 1927, he played Henry Spoffard in Gentlemen Prefer Blondes. Three years later, Morgan played what he considered to be one of his best roles in Topaze.

Morgan's theatrical career ended shortly after he began his contract with Metro-Goldwyn-Mayer. His last two shows were The Band Wagon and Hey Nonny Nonny!.

=== Film ===
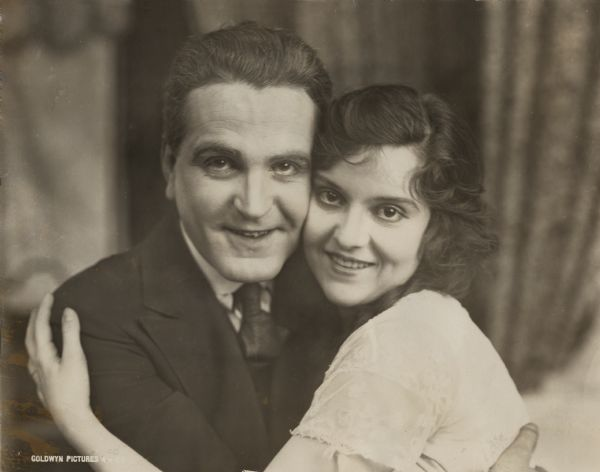
Morgan and Madge Kennedy in the silent film Baby Mine (1917)

Morgan starred in several silent films. He made his debut as Sir Richard in The Suspect (1916). Following that, he starred in Raffles, the Amateur Cracksman (1917) as Bunny Manders, alongside costar John Barrymore. He also starred in the propaganda film Who's Your Neighbor?, and others such as At the Mercy of Men, Manhandled (1924 film), Born Rich (1924 film), and had roles in other small films.

After signing a contract with MGM, Morgan starred with Al Jolson in Hallelujah, I'm a Bum in 1933. In 1934, Morgan received an Academy Award nomination for Best Leading Actor for his performance as Alessandro, Duke of Florence in The Affairs of Cellini. In the next year, he starred as a multimillionaire wooing Margaret Sullavan in The Good Fairy and as Jack Billings in The Great Ziegfeld. In 1936, Morgan played alongside Shirley Temple as Professor Appleby in Dimples. Speaking about Morgan, Temple wrote, "…Dimples pitted me against an accomplished veteran of the legitimate stage who was not about to let any little curly headed kid steal his scenes. Competition for camera attention had always been a fact of life for me. The kid and the expert could not help but collide."

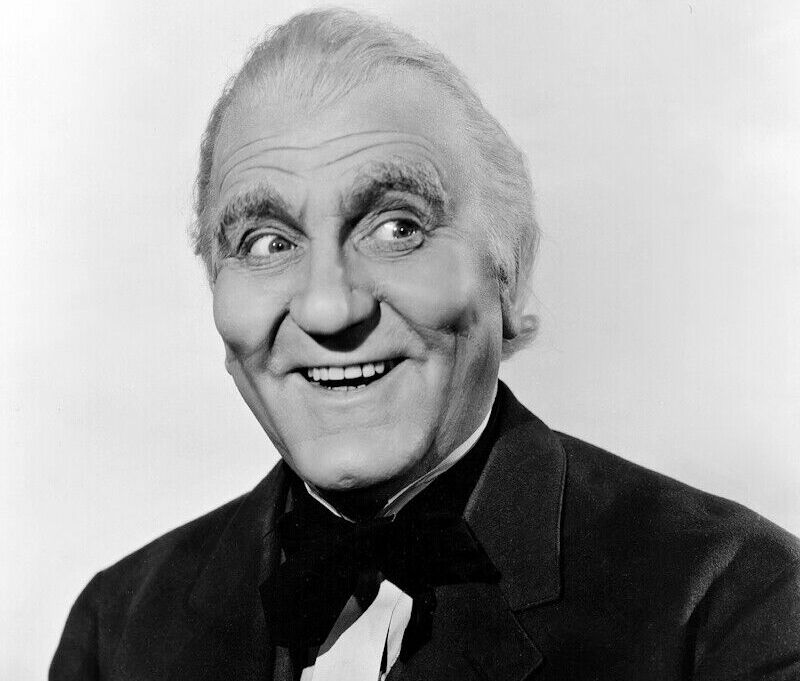
Morgan as the Wizard of Oz in the MGM feature film The Wizard of Oz (1939)

In The Wizard of Oz (1939), Morgan played five roles: the Wizard, the carnival huckster "Professor Marvel", the "bust my buttons" Gatekeeper who initially refuses to let Dorothy and her friends into the city, the "horse of a different color" carriage driver of Emerald City, and the Palace Guard who refuses to let Dorothy and her friends in to see the Wizard. Morgan was cast in the role on September 22, 1938. W. C. Fields was originally chosen for the part of the Wizard, but the studio ran out of patience after protracted haggling over his fee.

An actor with a wide range, Morgan was equally effective playing comical, befuddled men such as Jesse Kiffmeyer in Saratoga (1937) and Mr. Ferris in Casanova Brown (1944), as he was with romantic leads and more serious, troubled characters such as Hugo Matuschek in The Shop Around the Corner (1940), Professor Roth in The Mortal Storm (1940) and Willie Grogan in The Human Comedy (1943). MGM's musical comedy film The Great Morgan (1946) is a compilation film featuring Frank Morgan supposedly as himself but playing the familiar bumbler. Occasionally a co-star (as in The Human Comedy, and, once established, invariably a featured player), he also saw the occasional lead deep in his Hollywood career, as the philanthropic tycoon falsely accused of murder in 1941's Washington Melodrama and The Great Morgan (in which he is the Morgan of the title, the picture's central player).

During the 1940s, Morgan appeared in such diverse genres and roles as an oil wildcatter in Boom Town (supporting Clark Gable, Spencer Tracy, and Claudette Colbert); Tortilla Flat in 1942 (based on the John Steinbeck book, again supporting Tracy); a jungle doctor in White Cargo (supporting Walter Pidgeon and Hedy Lamarr); a shepherd in the Courage of Lassie in 1946; a doctor again in Green Dolphin Street in 1948 in support of Lana Turner, Van Heflin, and Donna Reed; King Louis XIII in The Three Musketeers in 1948, supporting Gene Kelly and Turner again; and as Jimmy Stewart’s boss in The Stratton Story in 1949. He played a fire chief in his final picture, Key to the City, filmed in 1949 but released posthumously in 1950.

=== Radio ===
Morgan also had a career in radio. In the 1940s, Morgan co-starred with Fanny Brice in one version (of several different series) of the radio program Maxwell House Coffee Time, aka The Frank Morgan-Fanny Brice Show. During the first half of the show Morgan would tell increasingly outlandish tall tales about his life adventures, much to the dismay of his fellow cast members. After the Morgan segment there was a song, followed by Brice as 'Baby Snooks' for the last half of the show. When Brice left to star in her own program in 1944, Morgan continued solo for a year with The Frank Morgan Show. In 1947, Morgan starred as the title character in the radio series The Fabulous Dr. Tweedy. He also recorded a number of children's records, including the popular Gossamer Wump, released in 1949 by Capitol Records.

== Personal life and death ==
Morgan married Alma Muller in 1914; they had one son, George. They were married until his death in 1949.

Morgan was widely known to be an alcoholic, according to several people who worked with him, including Margaret Hamilton and Aljean Harmetz. Morgan sometimes carried a black briefcase to work, fully equipped with a small mini-bar.

Morgan's niece Claudia Morgan (née Wuppermann) was a stage and film actress, and his brother was playwright Carlos Wuppermann.

Morgan had filmed a few scenes as Buffalo Bill in the musical Annie Get Your Gun (1950) when he died in his sleep of a heart attack on September 18, 1949, at the age of 59, at his home in Beverly Hills, California. Louis Calhern replaced him for that film. His funeral service was at All Saints Protestant Episcopal Church in Beverly Hills. Morgan is buried in Green-Wood Cemetery in Brooklyn. His tombstone carries his real name, Wuppermann, as well as his stage name.

== Awards and honors ==
Morgan was nominated for two Academy Awards, one for Best Actor in The Affairs of Cellini (1934) and one for Best Supporting Actor in Tortilla Flat (1942). He has two stars dedicated to him on the Hollywood Walk of Fame in Hollywood, California: one for his films at 1708 Vine Street and one for his work in radio at 6700 Hollywood Boulevard. Both were dedicated on February 8, 1960.

== Filmography ==
Year	Title	Role	Notes
1916	The Suspect	Sir Richard	Film debut, as Frank Wupperman; Lost film
1916	The Daring of Diana	John Briscoe	As Francis Morgan; Lost film
1916	The Girl Philippa	Halkett	As Francis Morgan; Lost film
1917	A Modern Cinderella	Tom	Lost film
1917	A Child of the Wild	Frank Trent	Lost film
1917	The Light in Darkness	Ramsey Latham	
1917	Baby Mine	Alfred	
1917	Who's Your Neighbor?	Dudley Carlton	Lost film
1917	Raffles, the Amateur Cracksman	Bunny Manders	
1918	The Knife	Dr. Robert Manning	Lost film
1918	At the Mercy of Men	Count Nicho	Lost film
1918	The Gray Towers Mystery	Billy Durland	Lost film
1919	The Golden Shower	Lester	Lost film
1924	Manhandled	Arno Riccardi	
1924	Born Rich	Eugene Magnin	
1925	The Crowded Hour	Bert Caswell	Lost film
1925	The Man Who Found Himself	Lon Morris	Lost film
1925	Scarlet Saint	Baron Badeau	Lost film
1927	Love's Greatest Mistake	William Ogden	Lost film
1930	Belle of the Night		Short
1930	Dangerous Nan McGrew	Muldoon	
1930	Queen High	Mr. Nettleton	
1930	Laughter	C. Mortimer Gibson	
1930	Fast and Loose	Bronson Lenox	
1932	Secrets of the French Police	François St. Cyr	
1932	The Half-Naked Truth	Merle Farrell	
1933	The Billion Dollar Scandal	John Dudley Masterson	
1933	Luxury Liner	Alex Stevenson	
1933	Hallelujah, I'm a Bum	Mayor John Hastings	
1933	Reunion in Vienna	Dr. Anton Krug	
1933	The Kiss Before the Mirror	Paul Held	
1933	The Nuisance	Dr. Buchanan Prescott	
1933	Best of Enemies	William Hartman	
1933	When Ladies Meet	Rogers Woodruf	
1933	Broadway to Hollywood	Ted Hackett	
1933	Bombshell	Pops Burns	
1934	The Cat and the Fiddle	Daudet	
1934	Success at Any Price	Merritt	
1934	Sisters Under the Skin	John Hunter Yates	
1934	The Affairs of Cellini	Alessandro – Duke of Florence	Academy Award nomination - Best Actor
1934	A Lost Lady	Forrester	
1934	There's Always Tomorrow	Joseph White	
1934	By Your Leave	Henry Smith	
1934	The Mighty Barnum	Joe	Uncredited
1935	The Good Fairy	Konrad	
1935	Enchanted April	Mellersh Wilkins	
1935	Naughty Marietta	Governor d'Annard	
1935	Escapade	Karl	
1935	I Live My Life	G.P. Bentley	
1935	The Perfect Gentleman	Major Horatio Chatteris	
1936	The Great Ziegfeld	Jack Billings	
1936	Dancing Pirate	Mayor Don Emilio Perena	
1936	Trouble for Two	Colonel Geraldine	
1936	Piccadilly Jim	James Crocker – Sr./Count Olav Osric	
1936	Dimples	Prof. Eustace Appleby	
1937	The Last of Mrs. Cheyney	Lord Kelton	
1937	The Emperor's Candlesticks	Col. Baron Suroff	
1937	Saratoga	Jesse Kiffmeyer	
1937	Sunday Night at the Trocadero	Himself	Short
1937	Beg, Borrow or Steal	Ingraham Steward	
1937	Rosalie	King	
1938	Paradise for Three	Rudolph Tobler	
1938	Port of Seven Seas	Panisse	
1938	The Crowd Roars	Brian McCoy	
1938	Sweethearts	Felix Lehman	
1939	Broadway Serenade	Cornelius Collier, Jr.	
1939	The Wizard of Oz	The Wizard of Oz/Professor Marvel/The Gatekeeper/The Carriage Driver/The Guard	
1939	Henry Goes Arizona	Henry Conroy	
1939	Balalaika	Ivan Danchenoff	
1940	The Shop Around the Corner	Hugo Matuschek	
1940	Broadway Melody of 1940	Bob Casey	
1940	The Ghost Comes Home	Vern Adams	
1940	The Mortal Storm	Professor Viktor Roth	
1940	Boom Town	Luther Aldrich	
1940	Hullabaloo	Frankie Merriweather	
1940	Keeping Company	Harry C. Thomas	
1941	The Wild Man of Borneo	J. Daniel Thompson	
1941	Washington Melodrama	Calvin Claymore	
1941	Honky Tonk	Judge Cotton	
1942	The Vanishing Virginian	Robert Yancey	
1942	Tortilla Flat	The Pirate	Academy Award nomination - Best Supporting Actor
1942	White Cargo	The Doctor	
1943	The Human Comedy	Willie Grogan	
1943	A Stranger in Town	John Josephus Grant	
1943	Thousands Cheer	Dr. Frank Morgan	
1944	The White Cliffs of Dover	Hiram Porter Dunn	
1944	Kismet	Narrator	Voice, Uncredited
1944	Casanova Brown	Mr. Ferris	
1945	Yolanda and the Thief	Victor Budlow Trout	
1946	Courage of Lassie	Harry MacBain	
1946	The Cockeyed Miracle	Sam Griggs	
1946	Lady Luck	William Audrey	
1946	The Great Morgan	Himself	
1947	Green Dolphin Street	Dr. Edmond Ozanne	
1948	Summer Holiday	Uncle Sid	
1948	The Three Musketeers	King Louis XIII	
1949	The Stratton Story	Barney Wile	
1949	The Great Sinner	Aristide Pitard	
1949	Any Number Can Play	Jim Kurstyn	
1950	Key to the City	Fire Chief Duggan	Final film

== Radio appearances ==
Year	Program	Episode/source
1937	Amos & Andy	Amos and Andy with Frank Morgan
1940	Screen Guild Players	The Shop Around the Corner
1941	Art Museum	January 9, 1941
1942	Pat O'Brien	April 23, 1942
1942	Command Performances	October 27, 1942
1942	The Pied Piper	December 21, 1942
1943	Nothing But The Truth	May 3, 1943
1943	The Human Comedy	July 12, 1943
1943	Holy Matrimoney	December 13, 1943
1944	Wallpapering	September 23, 1944
1944	The Frank Morgan Show	NBC August 31, 1944 - May 31, 1945
1945	The Devil and Miss Jones	March 12, 1945
1945	Birdseye Open House	September 13, 1945, host Dinah Shore
1945	Huckleberry Finn	October 14, 1945
1945	Names On The Land	December 24, 1945
1946	The Bickersons	60 episodes
1947	The Fabulous Dr. Tweedy	5 episodes
1948	The Jimmy Durante Show	January 14, 1948
1949	Kraft Music Hall	35 episodes

== See also ==
- List of actors with Academy Award nominations
