= At the Mercy of Men =

1918 film

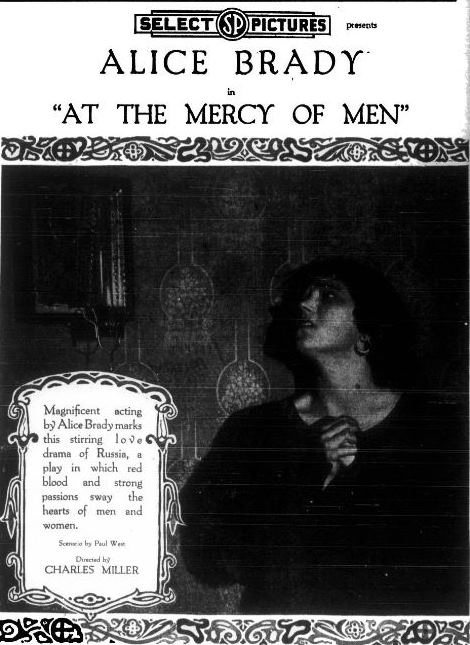
- Trade advertisement
- Directed by: Charles Miller
- Written by: Paul West
- Starring: Alice Brady; Frank Morgan; Jack W. Johnston; Robert Walker
- Cinematography: Harold Young
- Production company: Select Pictures
- Release date: April 20, 1918
- Running time: 5 reels
- Country: United States
- Language: Silent (English intertitles)

At the Mercy of Men is a 1918 American silent drama film directed by Charles Miller and starring Alice Brady. Its plot follows a young woman during the Russian Revolution who seeks to find the identity of her attack by a Royal Guard.

== Plot ==
During the Russian Revolution in Petrograd, Vera Souroff, a young Russian music teacher, is accosted on the street and dragged into a room where three men of the Royal Guard are dining. The lights are turned out, and she is sexually assaulted. The crime is brought to the attention of the Czar by the Countess Zaptine, a patroness of Vera, but Vera is unable to determine which man assaulted her as the crime took place in the dark.

In response, the Czar orders Count Nicho, the eldest of the officers, to marry Vera, and also mandates that each of them turn over all of their wealth and fortunes to her. After doing so, the men are sent to prison. Vera attempts to save Nicho and get him to confess the name of her aggressor. Now genuinely in love with her, Nicho admits that it was he, and the two embrace one another.

== Cast ==
- Alice Brady as Vera Souroff
- Frank Morgan as Count Nicho
- Jack W. Johnston as Boris Sitofsky (credited as Jack Johnson)
- Robert Walker as Count Andreas
- C. Porches as Count Michael
- Helen Lindroth as Mme. Souroff
- W.C. Carleton as Maj. Souroff
- Yolande Duquette as Countess Zaptine (credited as Yolande Buquette)
- Tula Belle as Alice

== Critical response ==
Maude Meagher of The San Francisco Chronicle felt that the film was "gorgeous enough." A critic of the Rapid City Journal described the film as a "timely photodrama... in these days of topsy-turvy adjustment, political and social." The Austin American-Statesman noted that director Miller "has a keen eye for strong dramatic effects," also praising the cinematography and performance by Brady.
