= Lucille McVey =

American actress, film director, and screenwriter

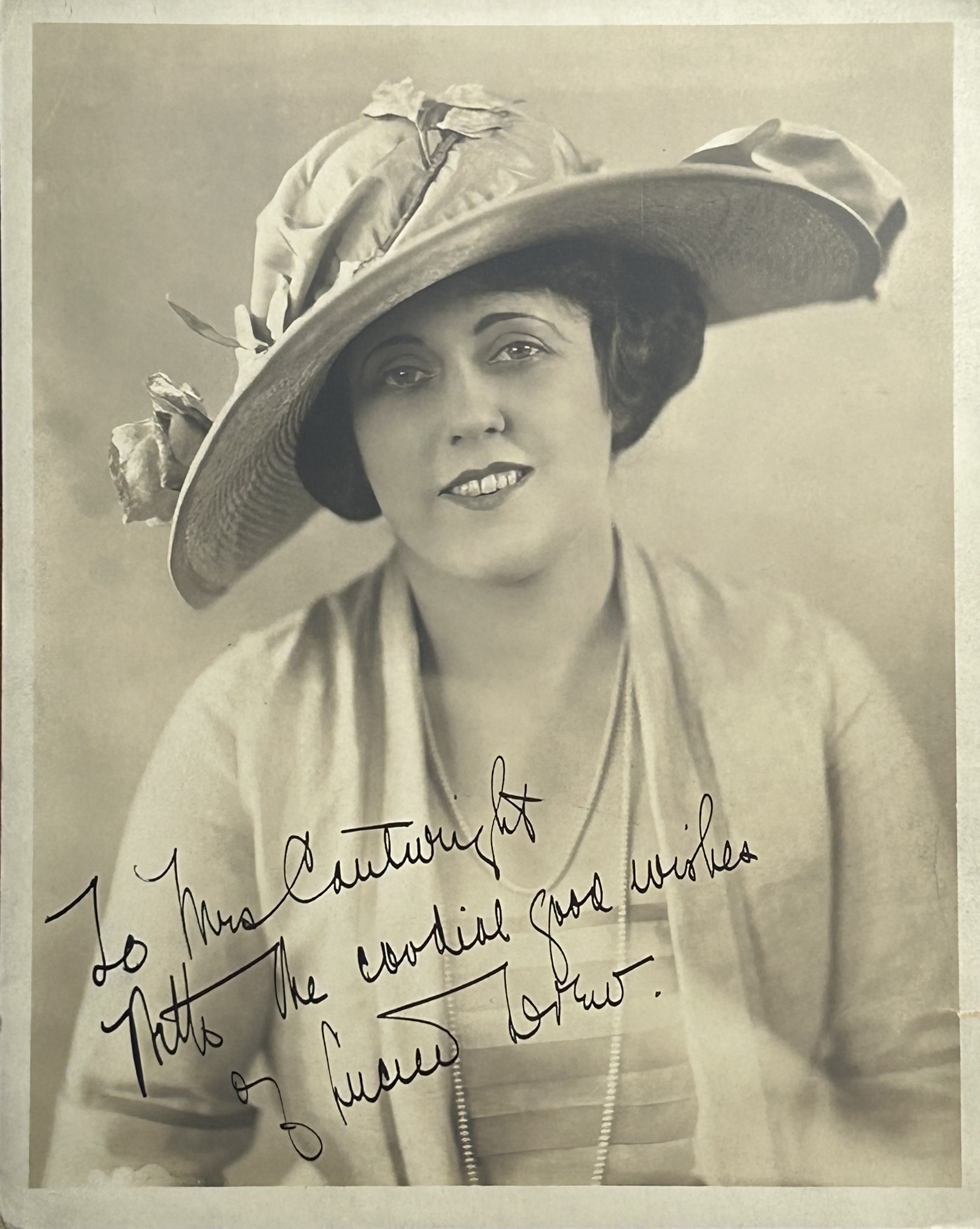
- Born: April 18, 1890; Sedalia, Missouri, U.S.
- Died: November 3, 1925 (aged 35)
- Other name: Mrs Sidney Drew
- Occupations: Screenwriter, director, producer, actress
- Spouse: Sidney Drew (m.1914–1919, his death)

Lucille McVey (April 18, 1890 – November 3, 1925) also known as Mrs Sidney Drew, was an American screenwriter, director, producer, and actress. In the early 1900s, she was part with her husband Sidney Drew of the famous comedy duo Mr. and Mrs. Sidney Drew.

== Biography ==
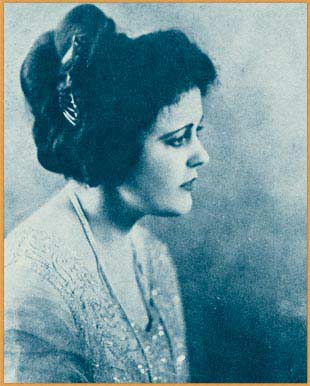
From Who’s Who On The Screen

=== Early career ===
Lucille McVey was born in Sedalia, Missouri, on April 18, 1890. From the age of 15, she worked as a comedian and was recognized as a foremost "child dialect reader". She went for a screen career in 1911 at the age of 21. At that time she was credited under the pseudonym of Jane Morrow, her grandmother's name.

In the early 1914, she joined the Vitagraph Studios where she met Sidney Drew and joined his company of players. In April 1914, she and the other members of the company accompanied Drew to Florida for a stay of six weeks, which started the beginning of their personal and working relationship.

Their marriage on July 25, 1914 led to the creation of Mr. and Mrs. Sidney Drew comedies.

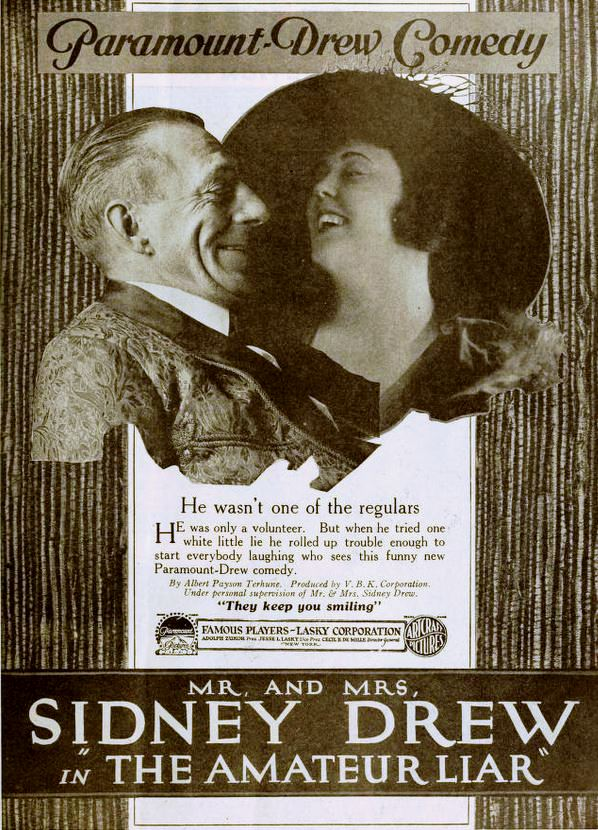
Ad for The Amateur Liar (1919)

=== Mr. and Mrs. Sidney Drew ===
Like many women of the period, such as Lillian Gish or Margery Wilson, McVey pursued opportunities to write and direct. She started producing comedies with her husband under the name Mr. and Mrs. Sidney Drew. They occupied their own unit at the Vitagraph Studios. Soon they specialized in what came to be known as "polite" or "refined" domestic comedies also called high-brow comedies - or situation comedies according to the current terminology. They found their humor in the small misunderstandings affecting the bourgeois people.

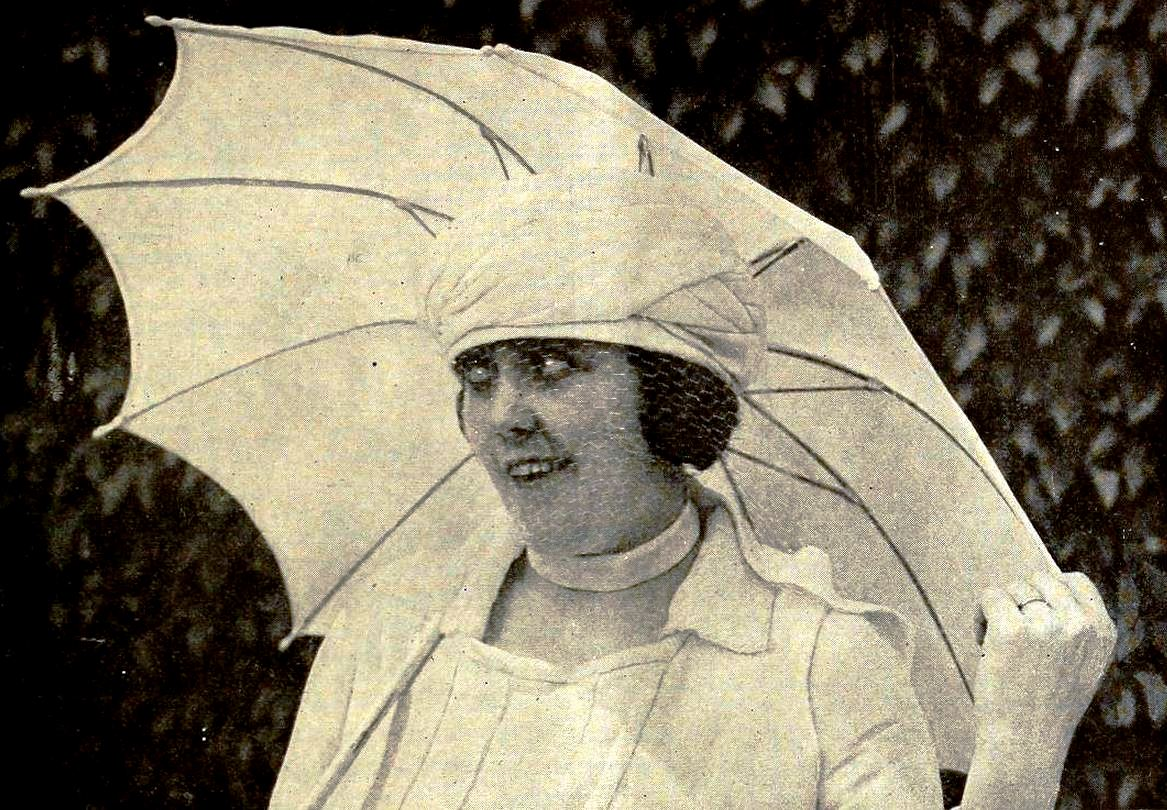
Still from Bunkered (1919)

Their first big success, Playing Dead (1915), was a five-reel "human interest drama" based on Richard Harding Davis's book. Sidney Drew directed it and Lucille McVey was credited as screenwriter. Following this success, they became a famous duo applauded by audiences and the industry.

At the time, comedy shorts were paid per production, not yearly. The 1918 crisis affecting the Vitagraph Studios forced the Drews to fly to Metro Pictures, who became their distributor. They continued producing short domestic comedies for $90,000 a year, releasing one one-reel comedy a week. During that time they perfected their Henry and Dolly characters, who will remain the central players of their productions from this point on.

At the expiration of their Metro's contract, they decided to temporally retire from the screen and returned to the stage with Keep Her Smiling, a lightweight comedy in which they both starred. In August 1918, they signed a contract with Amadee J. Van Beuren to produce a series of two-reel comedies released by Paramount while touring for Keep her Smiling.

In 1919, the Drews became independent producers, owner of V.B.K. Corporation, distributed by Famous Players–Lasky Corporation (Paramount Pictures Corporation). They slowed down the production to one or two comedies a month.

During the spring 1918, Sidney Drew's son from his first marriage, S. Rankin Drew, died while serving with the Lafayette Flying Corps, leading to the deterioration of Drew's health. Sidney Drew died on April 9, 1919.

=== Personal career ===
Lucille McVey kept making films from her own New-York studio. Merely a year after Sidney Drew's death, Pathé Exchange sold a series of six to eight two-reel comedies made by McVey-Drew based on the After Thirty stories penned by Julian Stuart. It is still unclear whether or not McVey made more than the first two films, The Charming Mrs. Chase (1920) and The Stimulating Mrs. Barton (1920).

In 1921, she began to write, direct and produce series of short domestic comedies for the Vitagraph Studios. Cousin Kate (1921), a five-reel feature based on the play from Hubert Henry Davies, starred Vitagraph biggest star Alice Joyce and was acclaimed by critics and audience. She was one of the four women to direct at Vitagraph Studios after 1916 with Marguerite Bertsch, Lillian Josephine Chester and Paula Blackton.

She died following an extended illness in 1925 at the age of thirty-five.

== Artistic collaboration ==
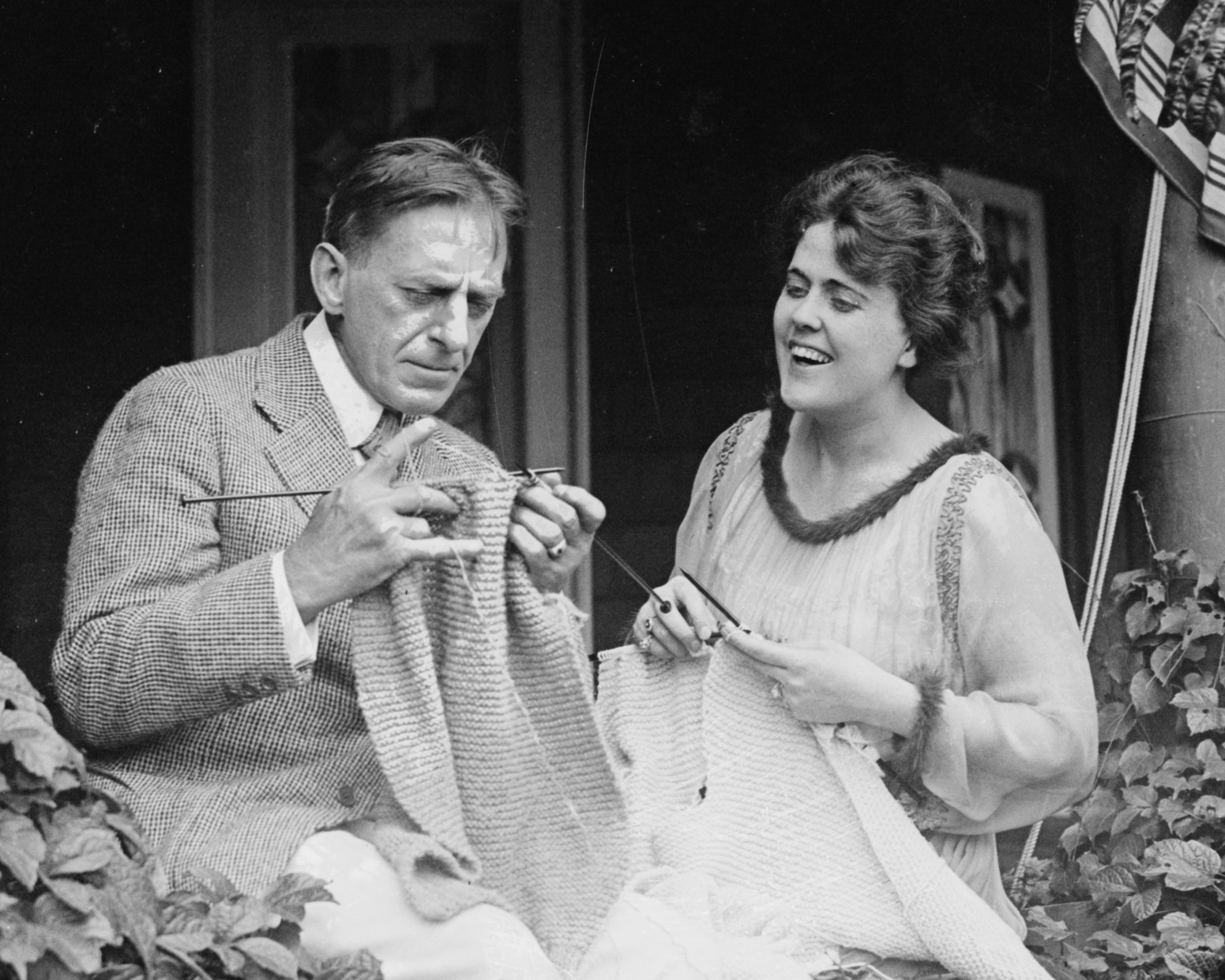
Mr. and Mrs. Sidney Drew

According to contemporary sources, Lucille Mcvey was the central creator of the Mr. and Mrs. Sidney Drew comedies. Despite her relative inexperience at her debut, she produced and directed more often than her husband and her input had an important impact on duo's creation.

She selected the ideas and developed them. She would look through incoming manuscripts as they were sent to the couple and reconstruct the script to give it its final shape. After two years of producing, only six comedies were made from a single author, the others from different writers all across America. The Drews bought scenarios only for the idea, believing that no author could "fit [their] particular methods."

For McVey, the essential of their ideas needed to be clear and thoughtful, inspired and based on real people and event. "Story must be real", she declared at the Photoplay in 1917. They based their stories mostly on married life, which offered a multiplicity of themes while being a "great part of the human". Subsequently, they mostly played husband and wife characters.

Lucille McVey bared the importance of the intimate in characters. The Mr. and Mrs. Sidney Drew comedies were mostly based on the use of subtitles. She believed they were "direct and human", helping to "get the story started and put continuity over quickly and speedily".

The Drew style was defined by the use of everyday situations of the bourgeois class turned into comical short comedies which was greatly acclaimed by the audience at their time.

== Selected filmography ==
=== Short films ===
Year	Film	Director	Producer	Writer	Actress
1914	Pickles, Art and Sauerkraut (Short)	No	No	No	Yes
1914	Never Again (Short)	No	No	No	Yes
1914	Bunny's Scheme (Short)	No	No	No	Yes
1914	Innocent But Awkward (Short)	No	No	No	Yes
1914	Too Many Husbands (Short)	No	No	No	Yes
1915	Auntie's Portrait (Short)	No	No	No	Yes
1915	The Hair of Her Head (Short)	No	No	No	Yes
1915	Wanted, a Nurse (Short)	No	No	No	Yes
1915	The Homecoming of Henry (Short)	No	No	No	Yes
1915	Playing Dead (Short)	No	No	Yes	Yes
1915	The Combination (Short)	No	No	No	Yes
1916	His Wife Knew About It (Short)	No	No	No	Yes
1916	When Two Play a Game (Short)	No	No	No	Yes
1916	A Telegraphic Tangle (Short)	No	No	No	Yes
1916	Peace at Any Price (Short)	No	No	No	Yes
1916	Childhood's Happy Days (Short)	No	No	No	Yes
1917	Lest We Forget (Short)	Yes	?	Yes	Yes
1917	Safety First (Short)	Yes	?	Yes	Yes
1917	Her Lesson (Short)	Yes	?	Yes	Yes
1917	Nothing To Wear (Short)	No	Yes	No	Yes
1917	Her Anniversaries (Short)	Yes	No	Yes	Yes
1918	Their Mutual Motor	Yes	?	Yes	Yes
1918	Why They Left Home	Yes	No	Yes	Yes
1919	Romance And Rings	No	?	Yes	Yes
1920	The Stimulating Mrs. Barton	Yes	Yes	Yes	Yes
1920	The Emotional Miss Vaughn	Yes	Yes	Yes	Yes
1920	The Charming Mrs. Chase	Yes	Yes	Yes	Yes
1920	The Unconventional Maida Greenwood	Yes	Yes	Yes	Yes
1921	Cousin Kate	Yes	Yes	Yes	No

=== Play ===
Year	Title
1918	Keep Her Smiling

== See also ==
- Mr. and Mrs. Sidney Drew
