= Manhandled (1924 film) =

1924 film by Allan Dwan

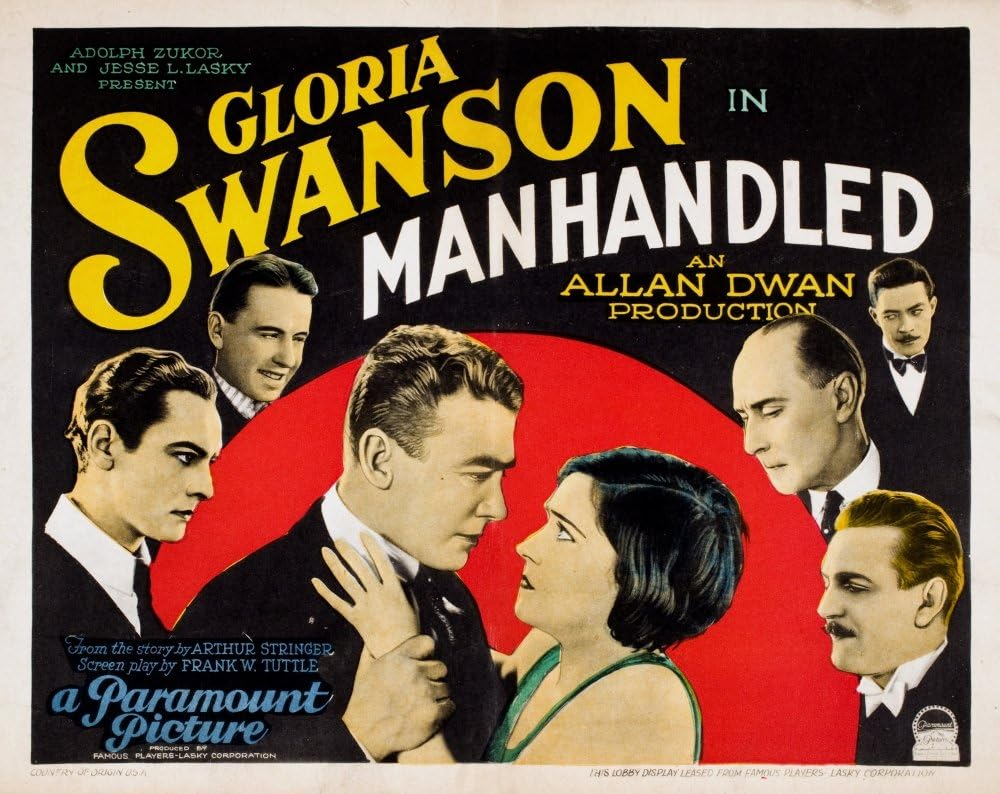
- Lobby card
- Directed by: Allan Dwan
- Written by: Frank Tuttle (scenario); Julian Johnson (titles)
- Based on: the short story "Manhandled" by Arthur Stringer
- Produced by: Allan Dwan
- Starring: Gloria Swanson; Tom Moore; Lilyan Tashman; Ian Keith; Frank Morgan
- Cinematography: Harold Rosson
- Edited by: Julian Johnson; William LeBaron
- Production company: Famous Players–Lasky
- Distributed by: Paramount Pictures
- Release date: August 4, 1924
- Running time: 63 minutes
- Country: United States
- Language: Silent (English intertitles)

Manhandled is a 1924 American silent drama film directed by Allan Dwan and starring Gloria Swanson. The film was produced by Famous Players–Lasky at their East Coast Astoria Studios facility, and distributed by Paramount Pictures. The supporting cast includes Frank Morgan, and Ziegfeld Follies headliner Ann Pennington, who performs a short novelty dance. A young woman goes out partying when her hard-working boyfriend neglects her.

Prints exist of this Swanson feature.

== Plot ==
Manhandled (1924)

The shop girl Tessie McGuire is invited by her boss to a fun party. There she acts like a Russian duchess. The owner of an expensive department store hires her to attract customers.

As she finds her way in New York's higher milieu, she alienates most of her friends. Although she preserves her honor, her boyfriend suspects she is being passed around by wealthy patrons.

== Cast ==
- Gloria Swanson as Tessie McGuire
- Tom Moore as Jimmy Hogan
- Lilyan Tashman as Pinkie Doran
- Ian Keith as Robert Brandt
- Arthur Housman as Chip Thorndyke
- Paul McAllister as Paul Garrettson
- Frank Morgan as Arno Riccardi
- Pierre Collosse as Bippo (credited as M. Collosse)
- Marie Shelton as model
- Carrie Scott as landlady
- Frank Allworth as boarder
- Ann Pennington as herself
- Brooke Johns as himself
