= Born Rich (1924 film) =

1924 film

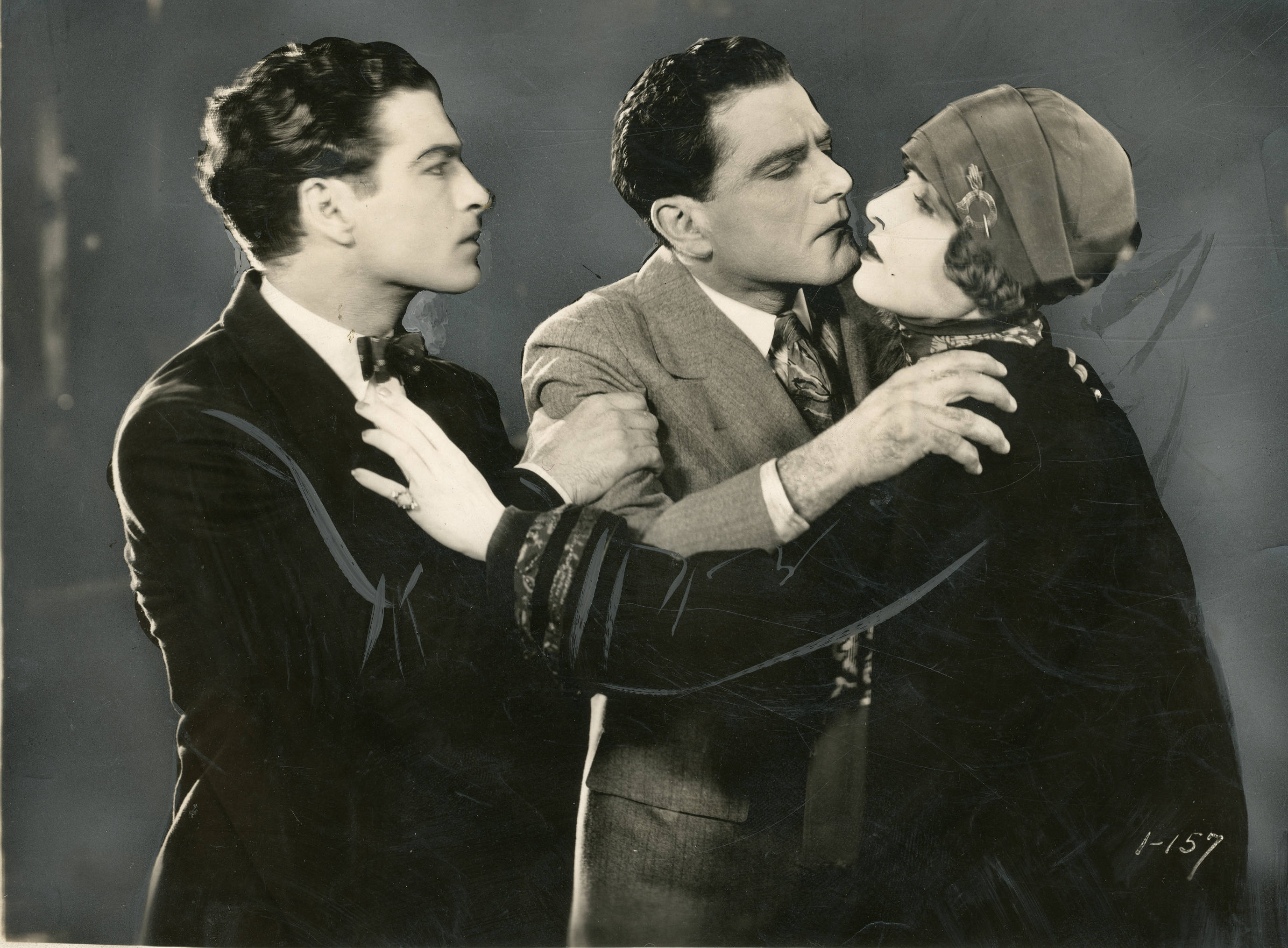
- Still with Cullen Landis, Bert Lytell, and Claire Windsor
- Directed by: William Nigh
- Screenplay by: Harriete Underhill; Walter DeLeon
- Based on: Born Rich by Hughes Cornell
- Produced by: William Nigh
- Starring: Claire Windsor; Bert Lytell; Cullen Landis; Doris Kenyon; Frank Morgan; J. Barney Sherry
- Cinematography: George Folsey
- Production company: Garrick Pictures
- Distributed by: First National Pictures
- Release date: December 7, 1924
- Running time: 80 minutes
- Country: United States
- Language: Silent (English intertitles)

Born Rich is a 1924 American silent comedy film directed by William Nigh and written by Harriete Underhill and Walter DeLeon. It is based on the 1924 novel Born Rich by Hughes Cornell. The film stars Claire Windsor, Bert Lytell, Cullen Landis, Doris Kenyon, Frank Morgan, and J. Barney Sherry. The film was released on December 7, 1924, by First National Pictures.

== Plot ==
As described in a review in a film magazine, leaving her palatial home and fast set of wealthy friends, Chadyeane goes to France where her baby is born. During her absence, Frances makes such a strong play for Jimmy that Major Murphy writes a warning letter to Chad about her husband.

Chad returns and misinterprets the meaning of a suitcase in her boudoir which Frances had inadvertently left there while changing her riding habit. Chad then affects a love affair with Jack, one of the fast crowd, ruling that married couples should travel on a 50-50 basis in all things. Many times Chad threatens to, and almost does, elope with Jack when her husband further compromises himself, mostly through inadvertences, with the butterfly, Frances.

Eugene Magnin, Jimmy's associate, in love with Frances, financially ruins Fairfax when the latter, in a drunken stupor, gives him power of attorney. Believing that they are "broke," Jimmy suddenly undergoes a rejuvenation. He spanks his wife, dresses his impudent child in overalls, and becomes generally aggressive. Major Murphy has saved Jimmy from bankruptcy, but Mrs. Fairfax, under the impression that her husband is now poor, forgives the suitcase incident and other similar incidents, abandons her affected love affair, and everything winds up happily.

== Cast ==
- Claire Windsor as Chadyeane Fairfax
- Bert Lytell as Jimmy Fairfax
- Cullen Landis as Jack Le Moyne
- Doris Kenyon as Frances Melrose
- Frank Morgan as Eugene Magnin
- J. Barney Sherry as Maj. Romayne Murphy
- Maude Turner Gordon as Aunt Fairfax
- Jackie Ott as Bugsy Fairfax
- W.H. Burton as Spinks

== Preservation ==
A copy of Born Rich is maintained at the Deutsche Kinemathek in Berlin.
