= Georgie Drew Mendum =

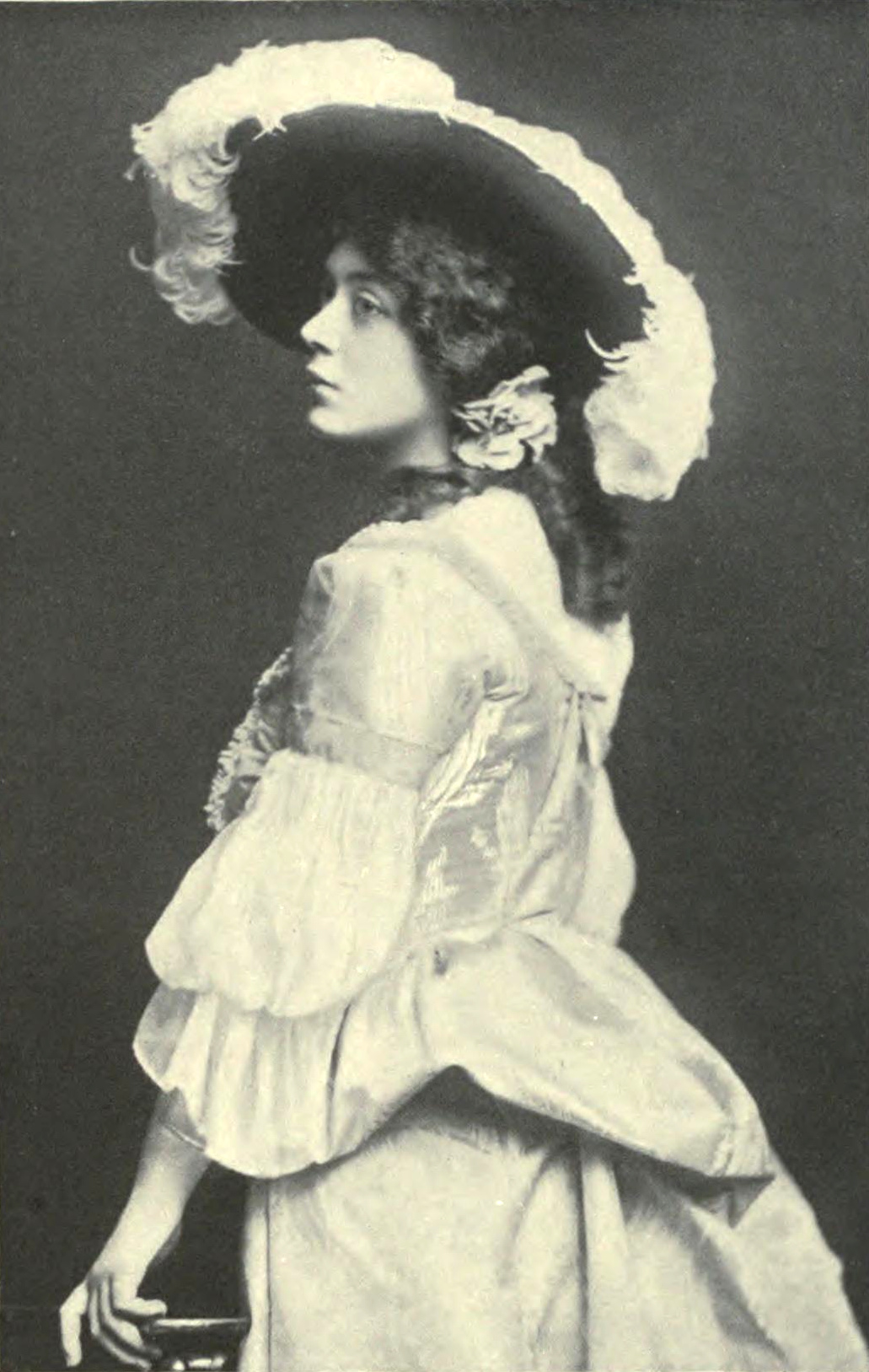
- Mendum circa 1900
- Born: Georgiana Drew Mendum; December 6, 1876; Philadelphia, Pennsylvania
- Died: July 30, 1957 (aged 80)
- Other name: Georgia Drew Parsons
- Spouse: George Webster Parsons (m. 1903–1911)
- Mother: Louisa Drew Mendum
- Relatives: John Drew Sr. (grandfather); Louisa Lane Drew (grandmother); John Drew Jr. (uncle); Georgiana Drew Barrymore (aunt); Sidney Drew (uncle)
- Family: Drew family

Georgiana "Georgie" Drew Mendum (December 6, 1876 - July 30, 1957) was an American stage actress. She was a member of the prominent Drew acting family.

== Early life and lineage ==
Mendum was born on December 6, 1876 in Philadelphia, Pennslyvannia to Louisa Eliza Drew (1852-1889) and Charles Albert Mendum (1849-1945). She was born to a very successful stage family. Her maternal grandparents were successful stage actors John Drew Sr. and Louisa Lane, while her aunts and uncles were actors John Jr, Sidney, and Georgie Drew - whom she was named after. Her cousins Lionel, Ethel, and John were all members of the prominent Barrymore acting family and her cousins Louise Drew and Sidney Rankin Drew were also actors. Mendum had one brother, Edmund, who was an author in the newspaper and published a book, The Barbarian and Other Stories Bedlum Mendum, in 1899.

Her father managed the Arch Street Theatre while his mother-in-law Louisa Lane ran it for a time, before he was fired. He also served as manager to actress and socalite Lillie Langtry. The family then moved to Boston where Charles worked as a banker. Mendum was raised separately from her acting family and did not meet Ethel until the mid 1890s. The two would become very close and would often star in the same productions.

Mendum's mother died in Boston in early 1889 when she was 12 years old.

== Life and career ==
Mendum made her stage debut in Catherine alongside Annie Russell, and by 1900, she had begun regularly appearing in her Uncle John's work. In 1906, she appeared in a production of The Time, the Place and the Girl as Nurse Mollie Kelly at the Alhambra Theatre in Milwaukee. The Milwaukee Daily News described her performance as "a refreshingly sweet and demure Mollie, and her ready wit and quick appreciation make her a most pleasing comedienne." She would appear in the debut of The Girl Question the following year where she once again received positive reviews.

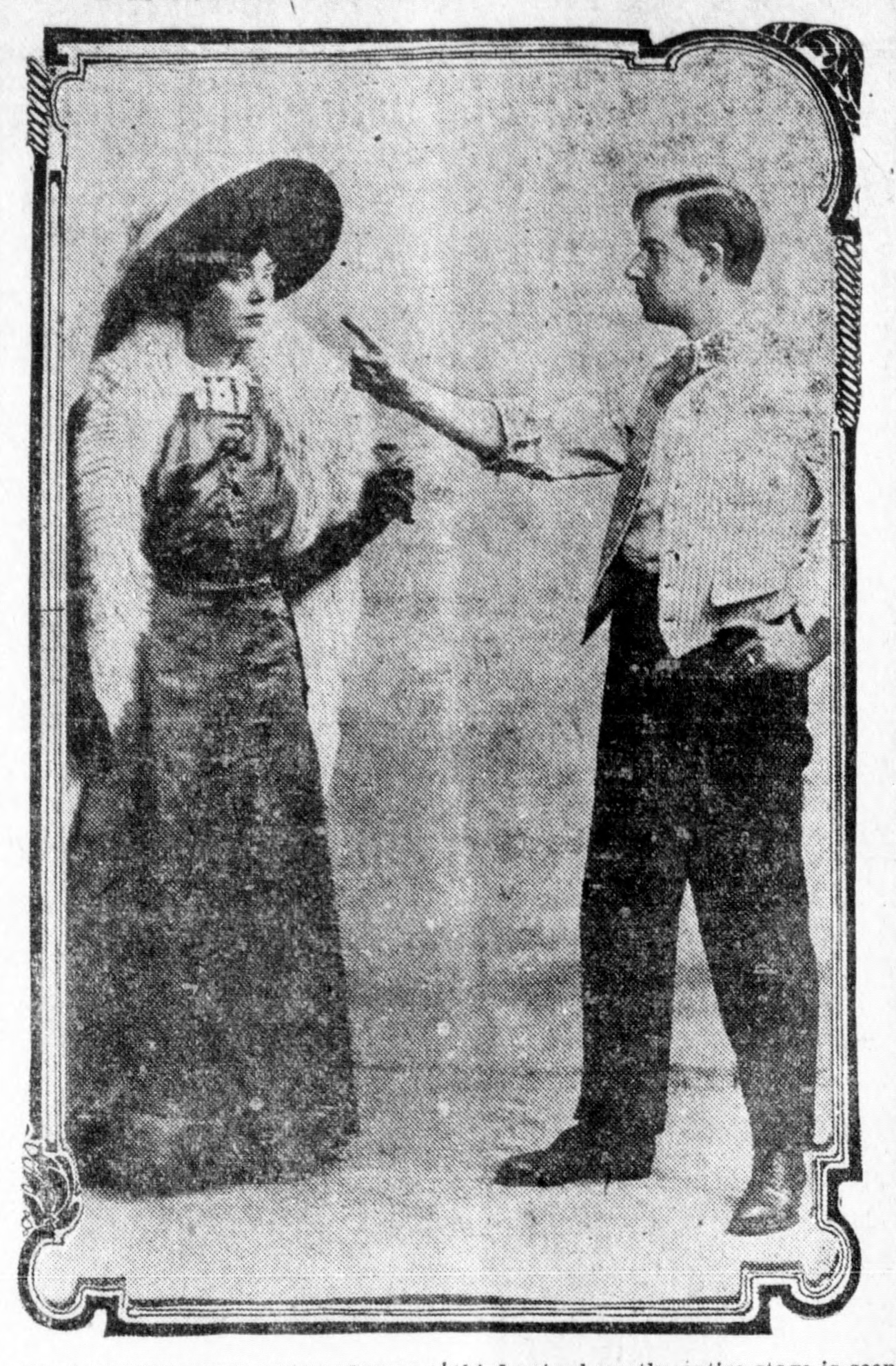
Mendum and Walter Thomas in Via Wireless (play), circa 1909

Mendum moved to New York City to pursue a stage career. She lived in a boarding house alongside fellow actors, such as her cousin Ethel Barrymore, Maude Adams, and Ida Conquest. Barrymore described Mendum as "awfully good" in theatre.

In 1908, Mendum starred in the original cast of Via Wireless as Mazie O'Brien. The show opened in a try-out at the National Theatre in Washington, D.C on October 19. In attendance were President Roosevelt, his wife, and their daughter were in attendance, as was his secretary William Loeb Jr., and John E. Wilkie, head of the Secret Service. The show moved to Broadway on November 2, playing in the Liberty Theatre, and closed out on January 16, 1909. Due to it is success, the production went on tour to Newark, Philadelphia, and an unlimited engagement in Chicago. Mendum's work as Mazie was described as "splendid".

In 1910, she appeared in the original Broadway production of The Echo as Laura Short in New York's Globe Theatre. The musical opened August 17 and closed two month later on October 1. The show opened to positive reviews.

While her cousins became film stars, Mendum only appeared very briefly in one film, 1920's Dr. Jekyll and Mr. Hyde, that starred her cousin John Barrymore in the titular role.

In 1930, she appeared in the original Broadway production of Scarlet Sister Mary as Doll at the Ethel Barrymore Theatre. The production ran just one week, opening November 25 and closing December 1.

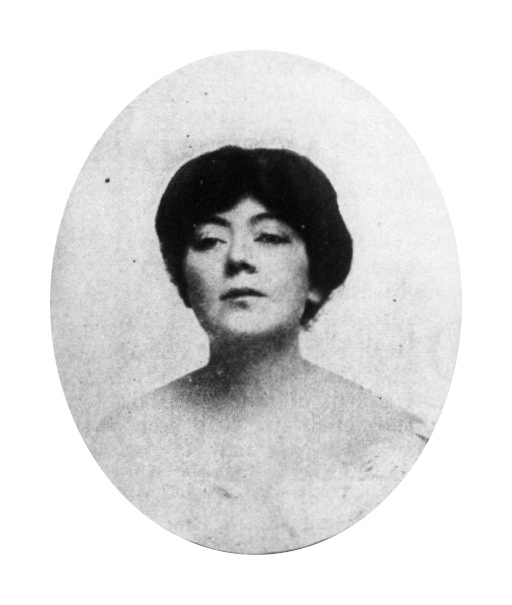
Portrait of Mendum, featured in Vanity Fair (magazine), 1916.

== Personal life ==
She married actor George Webster Parsons in 1903. Mendum filed for divorce in June 1911 on the grounds of infidelity. She was granted the divorce in October by Judge Charles McDonald, after presenting evidence she had gathered from following him to Chicago after hearing rumors of his infidelity. There she learned that he had a second apartment with another woman claiming to be his wife.

=== Legacy ===
The 1902 biography of Maude Adams By the Stage Door by Ada Patterson and Victory Bateman was dedicated to Mendum. Her portrait serves as the cover.

== Theatre ==
Year	Title	Role	Theatre	Notes	Ref
1896	The Rivals	Lydia			
1900	The Tyranny of Tears				
1902	Would You for Five Million?				
1904	Glad of It				
1905	The Belle of Richmond				
1906	The Time, the Place and the Girl	Mollie Kelly	Alhambra Theater, Milwaukee		
1907	The Girl Question	Jo Forster	Alhambra Theater, Milwaukee	Original cast	
1908	The Girl Question	Jo Forster	Chickering Hall		
1908-1909	Via Wireless	Mazie O'Brien	Liberty Theatre	Original cast	
1908-1909	Via Wireless	Mazie O'Brien	Tour		
1910	The Echo	Laura Short	Globe Theatre	Original Broadway cast	
1912	A Modern Eve	Eve	Bucklen Theatre	American debut cast	
1913	The Strange Woman		Lyceum Theatre	Original cast	
1915	A Modern Eve	Madame Ninche-Cascdier	Tour	Original cast	
1923	Neighbors	Mrs. Blackmore	48th Street Theatre	Original cast	
1924	Close Harmony	Harriet Graham	Gaiety Theatre	Original cast	
1926	Still Waters	Mrs. Kewback	Henry Miller's Theatre		
1928	The Kingdom of God	Innocent	Ethel Barrymore Theatre		
1930	Scarlet Sister Mary	Doll	Ethel Barrymore Theatre	Original cast	
1932	Encore		Tour		
1934	L'Aiglon	An Old Woman	Broadhurst Theatre		
1940	The School for Scandal	Mrs. Candour			
