= Louise Drew =

American actress

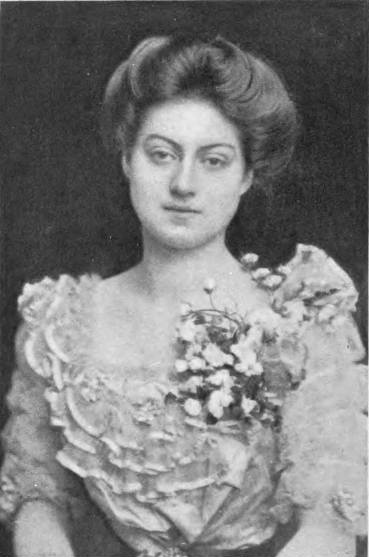
- Born: 1882; Philadelphia, Pennsylvania
- Died: April 23, 1954 (aged 71–72); New York City, New York
- Resting place: Mount Vernon Cemetery
- Occupation: actress
- Spouse: Jack Devereaux (m.1917)
- Children: 1(son; John Drew Devereaux(1918-1995)..)
- Father: John Drew Jr.
- Relatives: Louisa Lane (grandmother) John Drew Sr. (grandfather); Georgiana Drew Barrymore (aunt) Sidney Drew (uncle)
- Family: Drew

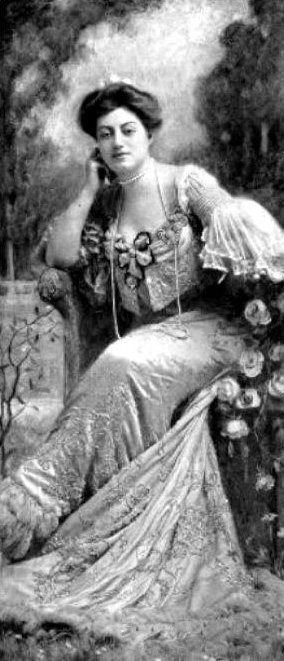
Photo of Louise Drew in 1902

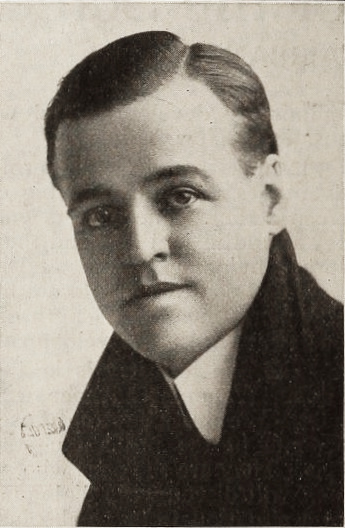
Husband Jack Devereaux

Louise Drew (1882 – April 23, 1954, New York City) was an American stage actress and member of the Drew acting family.

== Life and career ==
Born into a prominent stage family, Drew was part of the Drew family tree of actors. She was educated in both France and the United States. Her mother was stage actress Josephine Baker and her father was the Shakespearean actor John Drew, Jr., known as "The First Gentleman of the American Stage." Her paternal grandparents were actor John Drew Sr. and theatre manager Louisa Lane.

She made her Broadway debut in 1901 appearing with her father and cousin Georgie Drew Mendum in The Tyranny of Tears. She shared the stage with her first cousin Academy Award winner Ethel Barrymore in the Broadway production of Her Sister and the revivals Trelawny of the 'Wells' (in 1911) and Alice Sit-by-the-Fire.

Among Drew's many Broadway appearances were in The Second in Command (co-starring her father), Iris, Lady Rose's Daughter (1903), Whitewashing Julia (1903), Caught in the Rain (not connected with the Charlie Chaplin Keystone short), and as the French Countess in It Pays to Advertise (1914), which subsequently was revived on both stage and film. She appeared with many well-known stars of the era including Virginia Harned, Robert Edeson, Willie Collier and Fay Davis. She retired from the stage after the Broadway run of The Gay Lord Quex (which also featured her father) concluded in December 1917.

== Personal life ==
Drew married actor Jack Devereaux in April 1917 before he was called to serve in World War I. He also was an acclaimed Broadway performer before appearing in silent films produced by The Triangle Motion Picture Company. They had one child, Broadway performer and stage manager John Drew Devereaux.

Drew died on April 23, 1954, and is interred at Mount Vernon Cemetery in Philadelphia, Pennsylvania.
