= Louisa Drew Mendum =

American socialite (1851–1889)

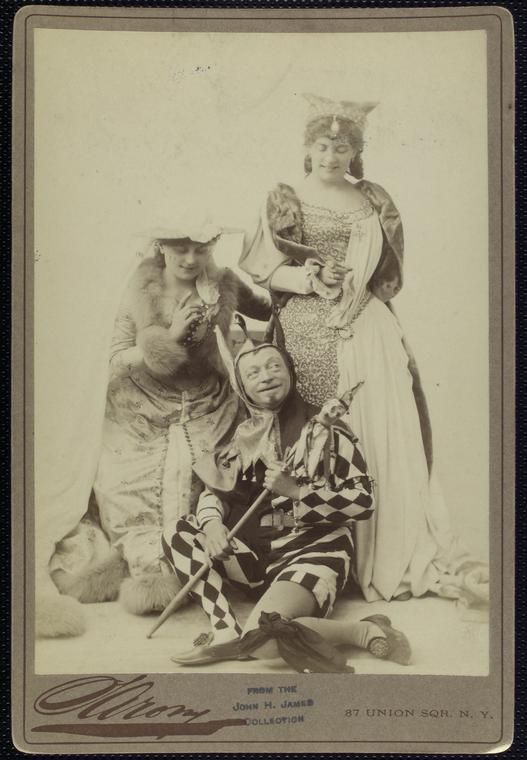
- Louisa Mendum(l) with Ada Rehan and James Lewis in Shakespearean scene.
- Born: Louisa Eliza Drew; December 7, 1851; Albany, New York, US
- Died: May 17, 1889 (aged 37); Boston, Massachusetts, US
- Spouse: Charles Albert Mendum (m. 1872)
- Children: 3, including Georgie Drew Mendum
- Parents: John Drew Sr. (father); Louisa Lane Drew (mother)
- Relatives: John Drew Jr. (brother); Georgie Drew Barrymore (sister); Sidney Drew (brother); Georgiana Kinlock (aunt)
- Family: Drew family

Louisa Drew Mendum (December 7, 1851 – May 17, 1889) was an American socialite. She was a member of the prominent Drew acting family that still continues today.

== Biography ==
Louisa Eliza Drew was born on December 7, 1851, in Albany, New York. She was the oldest child to actors John Drew Sr. and Louisa Lane. The entirety of her family were a part of an acting dynasty. Her maternal grandparents were Frederick Lane, an actor and theatre manager, and Eliza Trentner (1796–1887), a singer and actress. Her aunt, Georgiana Kinlock, was also a stage actress. While her younger siblings, John Jr. Georgie, and Sidney were all popular stage and film actors, as were their children. It is believed Drew had one more sister, Adine, from an affair between her father and Aunt Georgiana; this sister was also an actress.

Her father died in 1862 when she was just 10 years old.

In 1872, Drew married Charles Albert Mendum, the manager of her mother's theatre The Arch Street Theatre in Philadelphia, before he was fired. He also served as manager to actress and socialite Lillie Langtry. They then moved to Boston where Mendum worked as a banker. They had three children - John Albert, Edmund, and Georgie Drew Mendum. Edmund would become an author, while Georgie became a stage actress. John died on July 27, 1874, at eight months old due to cholera infantum.

In 1888, Drew became paralyzed. She died on May 17, 1889, in Boston, Massachusetts. Her cause of death was cited as a result from Bright's disease. Her funeral was two days later at St. Anne's Church and she was buried in the family lot at Forrest Hills.
