= Georgiana Kinlock =

American actress

- Born: Georgiana Lydia Kinlock; 1829
- Died: 1864 (aged 34–35); Philadelphia, Pennsylvania
- Other names: Georgiana Kinloch; Georgiana Stephens; Georgina Kinlock
- Occupation: Actress
- Children: 1
- Relatives: Louisa Lane Drew (half-sister); John Drew Sr. (brother-in-law)
- Family: Drew family

Georgiana Kinlock (1829-1864) was an American actress and an ancestor of the prominent Barrymore-Drew acting family. She is the namesake for her niece, American actress Georgiana Drew.

== Early life ==
Georgiana Lydia Kinlock was born in 1829 to singer and actress, Eliza Trentner, and actor John Kinlock. Her mother was once considered one of the best singers of English ballads on the stage. Kinlock had one older half-sister, Louisa Lane, from her mother's first marriage and two full sisters Adine (b. 1827) and Rosalie (b. 1830). The family set sail to Jamaica in November 1830 with John attempting to find better job opportunities. The ship would wreck, leaving the family and all passengers stranded for six weeks.

In 1831, John and Rosalie died of yellow fever while in Jamaica. Trenter also became sickly, however recovered the following year and returned the family to Philadelphia.

== Career ==
Kinlock would often perform at the Arch Street Theatre, which was managed by her sister, Louisa. The company, formed by William Wheatley and John S. Clarke, would be referred to as "one of the best ever organized in America".

In 1859, she was on a world tour with her brother-in-law, actor John Drew Sr. The pair performed The Rose of Killarney, with Kinlock as Lilly Lover and Drew as David O'Leary, as well as a number of other plays. This tour would include California, Australia, England and Ireland.

== Personal life ==
Before John Drew had married Kinlock's sister, Louisa Lane, Drew had been said to be courting Kinlock. Ethel Barrymore, Kinlock's great-niece, claimed that Drew and Kinlock were in love, however Lane would not allow the marriage. When Lane's second husband passed in 1849, she cut Kinlock out and began courting Drew. Drew and Lane would be married within the next year. A 1859 newsarticle suggests that Kinlock and Drew had still been exchanging letters until the day before the wedding.

From 1859 to 1862, Kinlock was on a world tour performing alongside Drew. While abroad, Kinlock wrote to her sister that she had been wed to a John (or Robert L., reports differ) Stephens in Australia and would be returning with a daughter, Adine "Tibby" Stephens - named for her and Lane's other sister. When Kinlock and her daughter returned, they moved into the Drew home and Stephens would never arrive to the United States. Modern speculation suggests that Adine was in fact the illegitimate daughter of Drew and that the pair used a false marriage to hide their infidelity. In an 1890 article, Adine is referred to as "Adine Drew" rather than "Stephens" and Georgiana Drew is said to be her sister. Adine would also become a well known actress, however she died on January 14, 1888 at the age of 26 from consumption.

Kinlock died in 1864 in Philadelphia, Pennsylvania.

== Theatre ==
Year	Title	Role	Theatre	Notes
1845	Money	Georgiana		
1859-1862	John Bull	Lady Caroline	Princess Theatre	
1859-1862	Irish Emigrant		World tour	
1859-1862	Handy Andy		World tour	
1859-1862	His Last Legs		World tour	
1859-1862	The Rose of Killarney	Lilly Lover	World tour	

== General references ==
- Barrymore, Ethel (1955). Memories: An Autobiography. Harper. ISBN 978-1299688919.
- Kelly, Rivka (2014). The Duchess: An Analysis of the Life and Legacy of Louisa Lane Drew (PDF). Scholarworks: University of Vermont.
