= Drew family =

American acting family

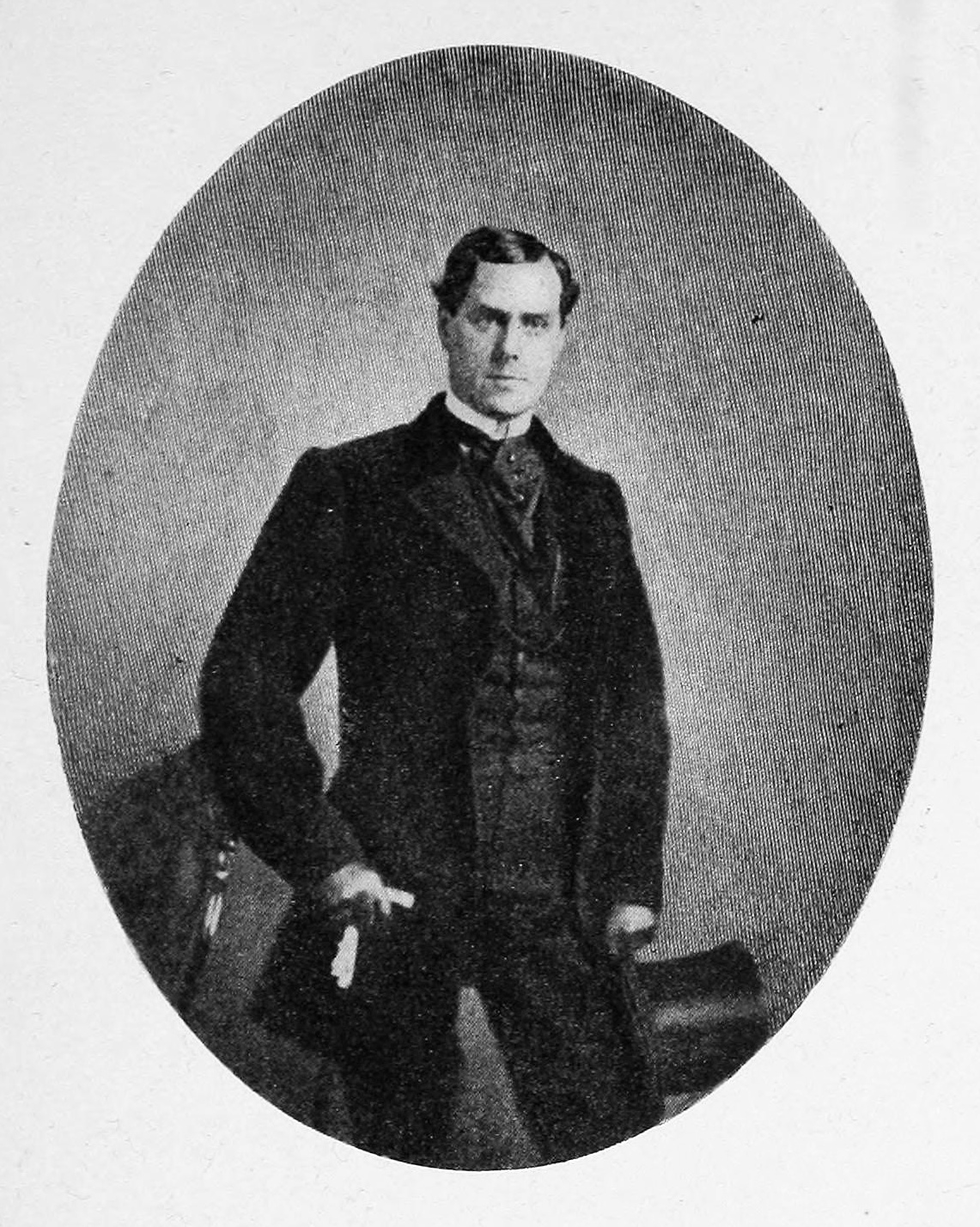
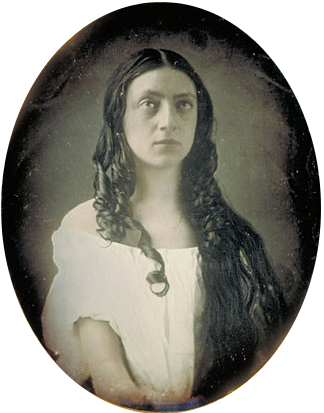
- John Drew Sr. Louisa Lane Drew
- Current region: United States West Coast
- Earlier spellings: Drewland
- Origin: Dublin, Ireland; London, England
- Connected families: Barrymore family Rankin family

The Drew family is an American multi-generational acting family prominent in the 19th and early 20th centuries. The family is best known as the maternal lineage of the Barrymore family, one of the most influential dynasties in American theatre and film history.

Members of the Drew family were among the earliest professional stage actors in the United States, with several achieving national prominence during the development of American theatre in the 19th century.

== History ==
The Drew family's theatrical legacy began with actor John Drew and actress Louisa Lane, both of whom were prominent figures in American stage performance during the mid-19th century. While Drew was the first actor in his family, Lane came from a stage family.

Lane was the daughter of Frederick Lane, an actor and theatre manager, and Eliza Trentner (1796–1887), a singer and actress. After her fathers death, her mother would remarry to British actor and stage manager John Kinlock. Lane's paternal grandparents, Thomas Haycraft Lane and Louisa Rouse, were also actors. Her half-sister was actress Georgiana Kinlock.

Lane and Drew would move to the United States, where they would establish their careers and eventual acting dynasty. The Drews owned the Arch Street Theatre in Philadelphia, Pennsylvania, where they staged performances, and she managed the business. The Arch Street was a competitor theatre of the still standing Walnut Street Theatre, also in Philadelphia. Lane was known as a theatre manager and played a significant role in sustaining repertory theatre during a formative period in American dramatic history.

== Relationship to the Barrymore family ==
The Drew family represents the maternal branch of the Barrymore family. Through the 1876 marriage of their daughter Georgiana Drew to Maurice Barrymore, the Drew family became directly linked to the Barrymore acting dynasty. This would unite the two established theatrical families and contribute to a lineage that would dominate American stage acting for decades. This union is frequently cited by theatre historians as foundational to the emergence of the Barrymore acting dynasty in American cultural history.

Their descendants continued in the performing arts across multiple generations.

== Notable members ==
=== First generation ===
- John Drew Sr. (1827–1862)
  - Married Louisa Lane (1820–1897)
    - Louisa Eliza Drew (1852–1889)
    - John Drew Jr. (1853–1927)
    - Georgiana Emma Drew (1856–1893)
  - Affair with Georgiana Kinlock (1829–1864)
    - Adine Stephans (1862–1888) (rumored father)
- Louisa Lane
  - Adopted (Note: While Lane claims to have adopted Sidney Drew, family members and modern critics believe that he is actually her biological son, born of an affair with actor Robert Craig.)
    - Sidney Drew (1863–1919)

=== Second generation ===
- Louisa Eliza Drew (1852–1889)
  - Married Charles Albert Mendum (1849–1945)
    - John Albert Mendum (1873–1874)
    - Georgie Drew Mendum (1876–1957)
    - Edmund "Bedloe" Mendum
- John Drew Jr. (1853–1927),
  - Married Josephine Baker
    - Louise Drew (1882–1954)
- Georgiana Emma Drew (1856–1893)
  - Married Maurice Barrymore (1849–1905)
    - Lionel Barrymore (1878–1954)
    - Ethel Barrymore (1879–1959)
    - John Barrymore (1882–1942)
- Sidney Drew (1863–1919)
  - Married Gladys Rankin (1870–1814)
    - Sidney Rankin Drew (1891–1918)
  - Married Lucille McVey (1890–1925)

=== Third generation ===
- Georgie Drew Mendum (1876–1957)
  - Married George Webster Parsons (div.)
- Louise Drew (1882–1954)
  - Married Jack Devereaux
    - John Drew Devereaux (1918–1995)
- Lionel Barrymore (1878–1954)
  - Married Doris Rankin (div.)
    - Mary Barrymore (died in infancy)
    - Ethel Barrymore II (died in infancy)
  - Married Irene Fenwick (1887–1936)
- Ethel Barrymore (1879–1959)
  - Married Russell Griswold Colt (div.)
    - Samuel Peabody Colt (1909–1986)
    - Ethel Barrymore Colt (1912–1977)
    - John Drew Colt (1913–1975)
- John Barrymore (1882–1942)
  - Married Katherine Corri Harris (div.)
  - Married Blanche Oelrichs (div.)
    - Diana Blanche Barrymore (1921–1960)
  - Married Dolores Costello (div.)
    - Dolores Ethel Mae Barrymore (1930–2003)
    - John Drew Barrymore (1932–2004)
  - Married Elaine Barrie née Jacobs (div.)
- Sidney Rankin Drew (1891–1918)

=== Fourth generation ===
- Ethel Barrymore Colt (1912–1977)
  - Married John Romeo Miglietta
    - John Drew Miglietta (born 1946)
- Diana Blanche Barrymore (1921–1960)
  - Married Bramwell Fletcher
  - Married John R. Howard
  - Married Robert Wilcox
- Delores Ethel May Barrymore (1930–2003)
  - Married Thomas Alexander Fairbanks/Fuchs
    - Hillary Klaradru Fairbanks
    - Anthony John Barrymore Fairbanks
  - Married Lewis Jospeh Bedell
    - Doré Lewis Bedell (born 1957)
    - Stephanie Bae Bedell (born 1966)
- John Drew Barrymore (1932–2004)
  - Married Cara Williams (div.)
    - John Blyth Barrymore (born 1954)
  - Married Gabriella Palazzoli (div.)
    - Blyth Dolores Barrymore (born 1960)
  - Married Nina Wayne (div.)
    - Jessica Barrymore (1966–2014)
  - Married Ildiko Jaid (div.)
    - Drew Barrymore (born 1975)

=== Fifth generation ===
- John Blyth Barrymore (born 1954)
  - Married Jacqueline (div.)
    - John Blyth Barrymore Jr.
  - Married Rebecca Pogrow
    - Blyth Lane
    - Sabrina Brooke
- Drew Barrymore (born 1975)
  - Married Jeremy Thomas (div.)
  - Married Tom Green (div.)
  - Married Will Kopelman (div.)
    - Olive Barrymore Kopelman (born 2012)
    - Frankie Barrymore Kopelman (born 2014)

== Notable works ==
- The Barbarian and Other Stories Bedlum Mendum. By Bedloe Mendum. New York: F Tennyson Neely, 1899
  - Authored by Edmund Mendum. Published under pseudonym.

=== Auto-biographies ===
- Barrymore, Diana; Frank, Gerold (1957). Too Much, Too Soon. Holt. ISBN 9780451014900.
- Barrymore, Ethel (1955). Memories: An Autobiography. Harper. ISBN 978-1299688919.
- Drew, John (1922). My Years on the Stage. New York: E.P. Dutton & Company.
- Lane Drew, Louisa; Taylor, Douglas (1899). Autobiographical sketch of Mrs. John Drew. New York, New York: C. Scribner's Sons.

== Notable accolades and nominations ==
Spanning more than five generations, the family has acclaimed a number of accolades, nominations, and honors.

=== Monuments ===
- Sidney Rankin Drew has a monument dedicated to him in Central Park in New York City.
- The Ethel Barrymore Theatre was opened in 1928, named for Ethel Barrymore. It is a Broadway theater at 243 West 47th Street in the Theater District of Midtown Manhattan in New York City, New York, U.S.
- A crater on the planet Venus is also named for Ethel.
- In February 2010, an intersection in Fort Lee, New Jersey, was renamed John Barrymore Way on what would have been the actor's 128th birthday. The intersection marked the spot of the former Buckheister's Hotel, where Barrymore had his 1900 stage debut in "A Man of the World".

=== Awards ===
Year	Family member	Award	Category	Work	Result	Ref.
1925	John Barrymore	Rudolph Valentino Medal	Best Performance	Beau Brummel	Won	
1930	Lionel Barrymore	Academy Awards	Best Director	Madame X	Nominated	
1932	Lionel Barrymore	Academy Awards	Best Actor	A Free Soul	Won	
1945	Ethel Barrymore	Academy Awards	Best Supporting Actress	None by the Lonely Heart	Won	
1947	Ethel Barrymore	Academy Awards	Best Supporting Actress	The Spiral Staircase	Nominated	
1948	Ethel Barrymore	Academy Awards	Best Supporting Actress	The Paradine Case	Nominated	
1950	Ethel Barrymore	Academy Awards	Best Supporting Actress	Pinky	Nominated	
1982	Drew Barrymore	British Academy Film Awards	Most Outstanding Newcomer to Leading Film Roles	E.T. the Extra-Terrestrial	Nominated	
1984	Drew Barrymore	Golden Globes Awards	Best Supporting Actress – Motion Picture	Irreconcilable Differences	Nominated	
1992	Drew Barrymore	Golden Globes Awards	Best Actress in a Miniseries or Television Film	Guncrazy	Nominated	
2000	Drew Barrymore	Primetime Emmy Awards	Outstanding Animated Program (for Programming One Hour or More)	Olive, the Other Reindeer	Nominated	
2009	Drew Barrymore	Primetime Emmy Awards	Outstanding Lead Actress in a Miniseries or a Movie	Grey Gardens	Nominated	
2009	Drew Barrymore	Golden Globes Awards	Best Actress in a Miniseries or Television Film	Grey Gardens	Won	
2009	Drew Barrymore	Screen Actors Guild Awards	Outstanding Performance by a Female Actor in a Miniseries or Television Movie	Grey Gardens	Won	
