= Ethel Barrymore Colt =

American actress, producer and soprano

- Born: April 20, 1912; Mamaroneck, New York, U.S.
- Died: May 22, 1977 (aged 65); New York City, U.S.
- Other names: Ethel Colt; Louisa Kinlock
- Occupations: Actress singer
- Spouse: John R. Miglietta (m. 1944)
- Children: 1
- Mother: Ethel Barrymore
- Relatives: John Barrymore (uncle); Lionel Barrymore (uncle); Maurice Barrymore (grandfather); Georgie Drew Barrymore (grandmother); Samuel P. Colt (grandfather)
- Family: Barrymore; Drew

Ethel Barrymore Colt (May 1, 1912 – May 22, 1977) was an American actress and producer and a soprano who sang in more than 100 concerts in the United States, Canada, and South America. She was a member of the ninth generation of the Barrymore acting family. Her obituary in The Washington Post described her as "a versatile and talented singer, actress and producer, playing dramatic roles on Broadway and in summer stock and singing in grand opera, operetta, musical comedy and on the concert stage."

== Early years ==
Colt was born on May 1, 1912, in Mamaroneck, New York, the daughter of Russell G. Colt and Ethel Barrymore. She was the niece of John Barrymore and Lionel Barrymore and the granddaughter of Maurice Barrymore, Georgie Drew Barrymore, and Samuel P. Colt. She had two brothers, Samuel Colt and John Drew Colt. Her parents were divorced on July 6, 1923. As an adult, she commented on her early years: "People think the Barrymores are peculiar people who sit around the hearth soliloquizing from Shakespeare. But as a matter of fact, my childhood was revoltingly normal." In another interview, she said: "In our family, we never discussed acting. We thought it almost indecent to talk shop."

Colt attended the Lenox School in Manhattan and acted in a class play and played basketball at Notre Dame Convent in Moylan, Pennsylvania, from which she graduated in 1929. In June 1929 she received the school's gold medal in music. After graduating, she attended the Villa Gazzola school in Verona, Italy, and studied in Italian music conservatories.

== Career ==
Colt found that bearing the lineage of the Barrymore family meant that she had to overcome obstacles. She said: "I figured that a career would be easy to build. But I found out that if you have a name like Barrymore and you get a job, everybody calls it influence. If you don't get a job, they assume you're no good. You can't win." In her later years, she said that she had "a lifelong love affair with the stage", which led to a commitment to persevere through her difficult times. She added that her mother sympathized with her but was unable to teach her.

=== Acting ===
Colt's professional stage debut occurred in a supporting role with her mother in Scarlet Sister Mary (1930). The role of Serraphine had the 18-year-old actress portraying an illegitimate child of a South Carolina black family. She and her mother appeared in blackface in their parts, the first time that any member of the Barrymore family had done so. In a review of the play's opening night in the Brooklyn Daily Eagle, Arthur Pollock wrote about Colt: "If she showed no signs of wanting to insist that she was a Barrymore and therefore a great person, she suffered from no amateurish self-consciousness. She seemed at home on the stage. She is sweet."

==== 1930s ====
In 1931, producer George White signed Colt to star in his Scandals. She left the show, however after some of her songs were given to Ethel Merman, leaving Colt with just one musical number. She explained her departure by saying that White made her a headliner when she "wanted to start in musical comedy like any unknown beginner". When the show opened in Atlantic City, Colt's and Rudy Vallee's names were displayed above the show's title. Noting her lack of experience, she said, "naturally I was unable to make a go of it". On that first night, she went on stage, she said, "opened my mouth to sing . . . and nothing came out." Newspaper critics "crucified me. They were right," she added.

She returned to Scandals in 1932, featured in a touring company of that production. Also in 1932 she toured in a revue headed by Harry Richman. Colt acted in St. Louis in 1933, playing small parts in that city's Municipal Opera productions throughout the summer. During that stay she underwent an appendectomy at St. Mary's Hospital. She had the female lead in the farce Under Glass in New York City in the fall of 1933. On radio, Colt acted on two episodes of the Rudy Vallee Variety Hour in 1934. Also in 1934 she and her brother Samuel had minor roles in L'Aiglon, in which their mother starred at the Broadhurst Theatre in New York City, and she had a featured role in She Loves Me Not at the Cass Theater in Detroit.

==== Jitney Players ====
She spent five years with the Jitney Players, not only performing but also driving a truck, making costumes, and writing material. That organization went into bankruptcy in 1934, and she was among the actors who were owed money when the operation shut down.

Following the bankruptcy, the Players resumed operation with Colt as manager. She reorganized the group and raised money for it. A 1938 Associated Press story reported that Colt "rescued them from bankruptcy". A story in The Boston Globe in 1939 said, "For 30 weeks each year, for three years now, 14 or 16 persons have depended on Ethel Barrymore Colt for a living." Her responsibilities included selecting plays that the group presented. She also maintained relationships with universities by working with theatrical clubs and conducting on-campus workshops.

She sometimes revised works for the Players, including Diplomacy (1938). Colt "based her version on contemporary war-time Europe". Her version of Rip Van Winkle (with music written by another member of the Players) combined elements of the original Washington Irving short story and five adaptations. The Players presented it in 1938 also. She left the group after five years of management in order to devote her time to singing.

==== Late 1930s ====
In 1937 on Broadway, Colt portrayed Grace Harkaway in London Assurance. for which she also wrote lyrics. Burns Mantle wrote in a review in the New York Daily News that Colt "reveals a pleasant mezzo-soprano voice, and has gained in poise and professional address since last she played in New York". Her other work on Broadway included portraying Penelope Halchester in Orchids Preferred (1937) and Pheasant in Whiteoaks (1938).

In 1937, Colt dropped her middle name for a time for professional purposes. She was in rehearsals for London Assurance at the time, and the program listed her as Ethel Colt. An article about the change in The New York Times said, "It is understood she wants to be 'on her own'".

==== 1940s and later ====
Colt acted for three weeks in summer productions at the Iroquois Amphitheater in Louisville, Kentucky, in 1941. While there, she also appeared in Stars Under the Summer Stars on WHAS radio. She portrayed her mother in a radio program on WABC in New York City on March 24, 1941. Sketches in the broadcast traced the elder Ethel's career from her initial appearance in The Rivals to her then-current work in The Corn Is Green. In the summer of 1945, Colt had the lead in a production of Tonight — or Never at the Summer Playhouse in Clinton, Connecticut.

In 1950, Colt acted with a company directed by Eliot Duvey. Productions in which she appeared included The Heiress at St. Michael's Playhouse in Winooski, Vermont. She portrayed Constance Bonacieux in The Three Musketeers in Memphis in 1951 and returned to Memphis in 1952 to star in Let Us Be Gay. In 1954 & 1955, she was a soloist with the Naumburg Orchestral Concerts, in the Naumburg Bandshell, Central Park, in the summer series.

On Broadway, Colt performed in Under Glass, L'Aigion, Cradle Song, and portrayed Christine Crane in Follies (a role that required her to learn tap dancing to perform an eight-minute dance) at the Winter Garden Theatre in 1971. In 1958, she portrayed Madame Dubonnet in The Boy Friend at the Clinton Playhouse.

Colt performed in Knights of Song for the St. Louis Municipal Opera in 1960. She said at that time that she had given so many concerts and sung with opera companies enough that people had forgotten that she was also an actress. The non-singing role of Mrs. William S. Gilbert allowed her to demonstrate her acting ability again.

In the 1970s, she acted in professional touring and regional productions of Hamlet, The Man Who Came To Dinner, Hay Fever. and Gigi. She also had the speaking role of the Duchess of Krackenthrop in the New York City Opera's production of The Daughter of the Regiment (1975).

=== Singing ===
Colt told newspaper columnist Earl Wilson in 1952 that her mother encouraged her to pursue singing. "Mother knew," she said, "that as an actress, all my life I'd be compared to her." She added that she heard "Mother continually saying, 'It's wonderful to have a voice'". Despite the setback of her initial experience singing in Scandals, she continued to sing.

When Colt was not on tour with theatrical productions, she studied voice with Maggie Teyte and Queena Mario, gaining training that enabled her to sing with small opera companies. Her operatic debut came when she portrayed Micaela in the Columbia Grand Opera's (CGO) production of Carmen in the Maryland Theater in Baltimore on January 30, 1941. She also sang with CGO in La bohème in October 1941. In December 1941 she toured with the Columbia Opera Company of New York, singing in Faust. Her other operatic roles included Nedda in Pagliacci, Musetta in La Boheme, Olga in Fedora, Violetta in La Traviata, and Siebel and Marguerite in Faust. Her New York opera debut occurred when she had the leading role in Martha at the City Center on February 22, 1944.

Even after Colt had sung in more than 100 concerts, however, her name led people to think of her as a dramatic actress rather than as a singer. Doubts affected her confidence about her musical talent. She said: "Every time I got a job, I always heard or possibly thought it was because of the family name. You see, until you're established, the audience says, 'Oh, there's Ethel Barrymore's daughter who thinks she can sing . . . '" She therefore assumed the name Louisa Kinlock (from two of her great-grandmothers' names) and won a part in The Little Orchestra Society's production of Gluck's Orpheus. After she had performed as Kinlock for a year, Time magazine disclosed her real name.

Even after the initial disclosure of her identity, Colt sometimes used Louisa Kinlock as a stage name for singing performances. Before she made the New York City debut of Songs of the Theater she sang as Kinlock for more than a year, performing the program on a tour of the United States. An Associated Press article reported: "Louisa Kinlock won applause from critics. So now Ethel Barrymore Colt is taking off her disguise and invading the country's toughest musical stronghold, New York."

Colt made her cabaret debut at the Versailles Club in New York City. Her act included "a number of songs . . . together with thumbnail sketches of her family in their greatest roles". In 1939, Colt performed at the Latin Quarter nightclub in Boston, singing a song and encores twice each evening. She continued singing in night clubs in 1940, with her first night's performances in Philadelphia resulting in three encores for her first appearance and two for her second. Other cities in which she sang included Miami Beach and Montreal.

Colt had a month-long vaudeville tour in 1940 before she began night club engagements in New York. The tour featured semi-classical and popular songs. She made her dresses on a portable sewing machine during times between performances. In 1942, she sang grand opera 18 times in the United States and Canada.

Colt performed on network television on March 6, 1950, starring as Rosalinda in NBC's production of Die Fledermaus. Also in March 1950, she sang in Rosalinda on NBC Opera Theatre. She sang the role of Violetta in 1953 in La Traviata in a Summer Opera production in Cincinnati. Also in 1953, she sang in Faust with the Cincinnati Zoo Opera. Colt's London singing debut in 1955 received mixed reactions from critics after she performed music from the 13th century to the present in Wigmore Hall. On July 17, 1957, Colt sang at Lewisohn Stadium in her debut there, performing three settings of scenes from Shakespeare. A review in The New York Times described Colt's voice as "light but pretty" and called her "a sensitive singer" but said, "her vocal technique was not up to all of the demands she imposed on it."

In 1968, Colt and Peggy Wood teamed up to present A Madrigal of Shakespeare for two shows at the Theatre de Lys in New York City. "Wood did most of the talking", while "Colt did the singing".

Colt portrayed the Duchess of Krackenthorp in the New York City Opera's production of Daughter of the Regiment (1975). She was in the Dayton Kenley Players' production of Send in the Clowns in 1976.

=== One-woman shows ===
In 1943, Colt presented The American Musical Theater of Yesterday, which included "lighthearted burlesques of singers of various eras". She began a series of lecture appearances in 1944. A Barrymore Sings for Her Supper included anecdotes about her family and her own experiences, some of which she illustrated with songs.

From 1950 into the 1970s, Colt often had one-woman presentations in which she both acted and sang.

A 1950 series of appearances, Songs of the Theater, had Colt demonstrating "what must be a family requisite, to do several things well." That presentation combined Colt's acting and singing talents to present music in theatrical contexts from Ophelia's songs in Hamlet to "To This We've Come" from The Consul, with other selections such as "Tea for Two" and "Moanin' Low" in between. She continued to present that program in 1951-1953 and in 1955. Colt modified her presentation in 1956, with one part offering selections from Songs of the Theater and the other selections from "the theater's contribution to great music from Shakespeare's plays to Menotti's The Consul".

In 1960, she performed the "one-woman musical drama" Curtains Up. The program was "a tribute to the American musical stage" with scenes and songs from a variety of shows. She continued to present Curtains Up in subsequent years. In 1967, she began performing the one-woman show Take It from the Top, which also featured songs from the American musical theater. In 1973, she performed the one-woman show Great Moments in American Music.

In the 1970s, the United States State Department sponsored Colt's visit to Europe to present her one-woman show, Music Written for the American Theater.

=== Other activities ===
During World War II Colt was a nurses' aide with the Red Cross and a member of the American Theatre Wing's War Service Speaker's Bureau. She spoke a couple of times a week "on any patriotic topic from war bonds to salvage". She also was active at the Stage Door Canteen for military personnel in New York City.

In the summer of 1966 Colt was artist in residence for the initial Drama Workshop at Salve Regina College. While there, she taught an acting course and starred in a production of Curtains Up. In the mid-1960s, she hosted a summer school for dramatic and vocal training for students ages 16 and older. She also taught at Mannes College in New York and at the University of Alabama.

== Plays for Living ==
Colt was a member of the national committee of the Family Service Association of America, the activities of which included presenting plays "designed to dramatize and offer guidance for many common family problems". She chaired the association's Plays for Living program, which enacted 30-minute plays about topics that included family counseling, foster parenting, juvenile delinquency, and unwed motherhood. After each play, a trained facilitator led an audience discussion on the topic presented in the play. Colt described the combination of drama and discussion as "enormously effective" in helping people explore problems. Her activities as chair took her to cities across the United States, helping people to see how they could implement the program in their own communities. Her responsibilities with Plays for Living included commissioning plays and supervising productions.

== Personal life and death ==
Colt married business executive John R. Miglietta on December 1, 1944, in New York City. They had a son, John Drew Miglietta. In July 1960, she inherited ownership of one-fourth of Linden Place in Bristol, Rhode Island. The inheritance, which she shared with her husband, their son, and her brother, included a 25-room mansion that was built in 1812, a laundry, a garage, a carriage house, and outbuildings on two acres plus a nearby 425-acre dairy.

Colt died of cancer on May 22, 1977, at her home in New York City, aged 65. Memorial services were at Actors Chapel in New York City.
