= John Drew Sr. =

19th-century Irish-American actor and theatre manager

John Drew
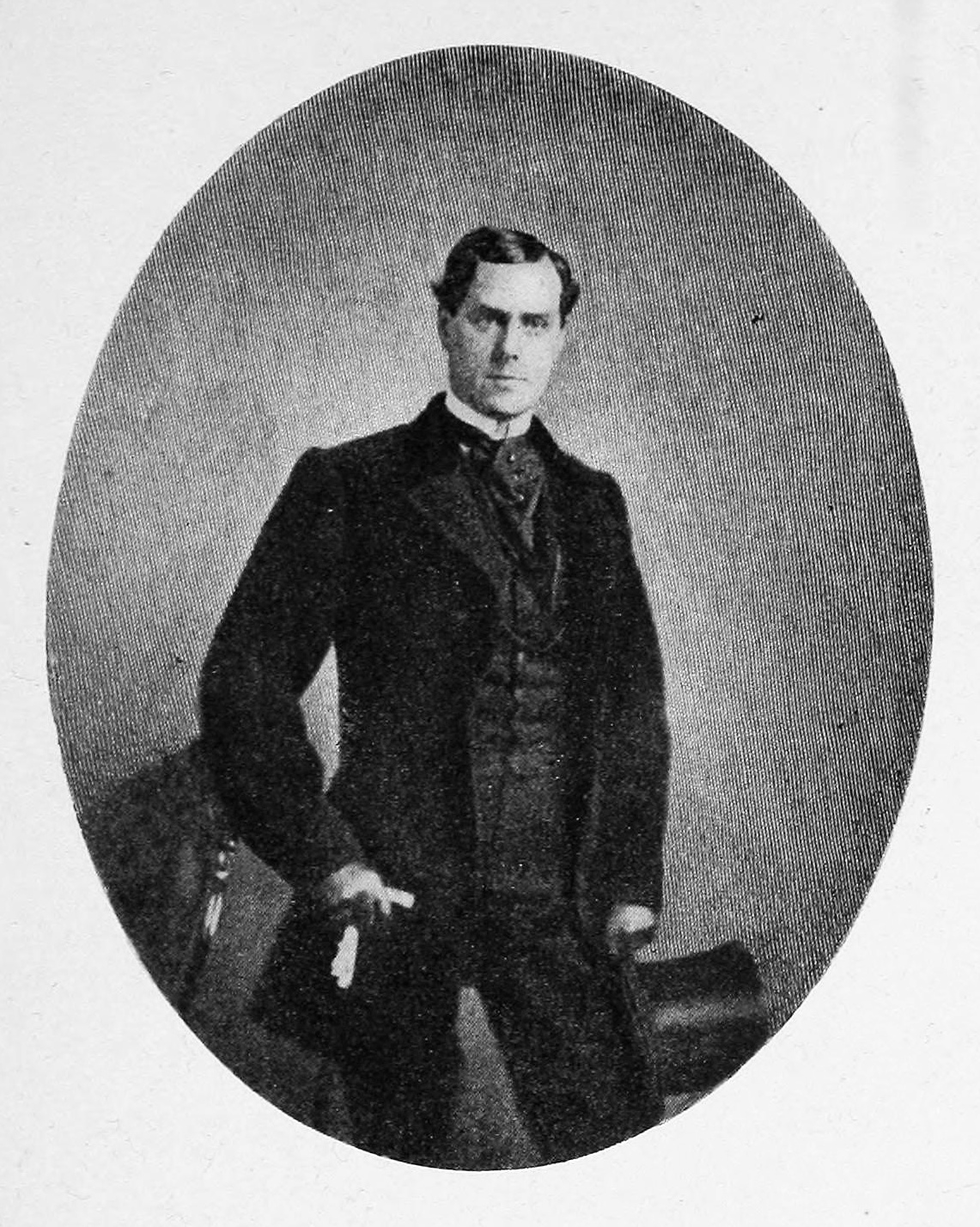
- Born: Jonathan Henry Drewland; September 3, 1827; Dublin, Ireland
- Died: May 21, 1862 (aged 34); Philadelphia, Pennsylvania, U.S.A.
- Resting place: Mount Vernon Cemetery (Philadelphia, Pennsylvania)
- Spouse: Louisa Lane Drew (m. 1850)
- Children: Louisa Drew Mendum; John Drew Jr. Georgiana Drew; Adine Stephens (rumored)
- Relatives: Georgiana Kinlock (sister-in-law)
- Family: Drew

John Drew (September 3, 1827 – May 21, 1862) was an Irish-American stage actor and theatre manager. Drew is a part of the multi-generational Drew acting family and the great-great-grandfather of actress Drew Barrymore.

== Early life ==
Born Jonathan Henry Drewland in Dublin, Ireland, (1801–1922) to father Thomas L. Drewland and Louise Kanten. He was the fifth of their six children. In 1832, he journeyed and crossed the Atlantic Ocean, emigrated to the United States with his family to Boston, Massachusetts in New England. As a child, he spent most of his life living in Boston. This is where he began acting. A younger brother, Frank Drew (1831–1903), also came from Ireland to America, becoming an actor also.

His brother, Edward, would become a captain in Hiram Berdan's sharpshooters during the United States Civil War. He was killed in action. Another brother, George, also served in the Union Army and died in Buffalo while recovering from wounds.

== Career ==
After moving to the United States, Drew got a job in Joseph J. Johlen's theatrical company. He appeared in a number of Johlen's plays, including Uncle Mutch, The Barber Man, Canterbury of Livingston and The Progrist.

Drew made his first New York appearance in 1846. He played Irish and light comedy parts with success in many American cities. He was the co-manager of the famous Arch Street Theatre in Philadelphia after 1860 with his wife Louisa Lane, who also assisted in the theatre management along with the nearby Walnut Street Theatre.

Before his early death, the Arch Theatre advertised the countdown to his 100th performance at the theatre. His 94th performance was on May 1, 1862, with The Groves of Blarney and his 96th was two nights later with Irish Attorney.

== Personal life ==
Drew married Louisa Lane in 1848, this being her third marriage and his first. They had subsequently three children together: Louisa, John Jr., and Georgiana.

=== Affair ===
Before Drew had married Lane, he had been said to be courting her half-sister, Georgiana Kinlock. A 1859 newsarticle suggests that Kinlock and Drew had been exchanging letters until the day before the wedding. Ethel Barrymore, Drew's granddaughter, claimed that Drew and Kinlock were in love, however Lane would not allow the marriage and she wed him instead.

From 1859 to 1862, Drew was on a world tour performing alongside Kinlock. While abroad, Kinlock wrote to her sister that she had been wed to a John Stephens in Australia and would be returning with a daughter, Adine Stephens - named for her and Lane's other sister. When Kinlock and her daughter returned, they moved into the Drew home and Stephens would never arrive to the United States. Modern speculation suggests that Adine was in fact the illegitimate daughter of Drew and that the pair used a false marriage to hide their infidelity. In an 1890 article, Adine is referred to as "Adine Drew" rather than " Adine Stephens" and Georgiana Drew is said to be her sister.

=== Death and legacy ===
Drew died at his home in Philadelphia, Pennsylvania on May 21, 1862, at the age of 34, after tripping, falling and hitting his head during a party for his six-year-old daughter Georgiana. He was buried in nearby Glenwood Cemetery (now Glenwood Memorial Gardens), in Philadelphia, which was later closed. His remains were then moved to nearby Mount Vernon Cemetery in Philadelphia.

After his death, his wife, Louisa, took over the management of the Arch Street Theatre for the next three decades up to 1892. The Arch Street venue survived as the second oldest theatre in America until 1936 when it was demolished after 108 years.
