= Jonathan Bayard Smith =

American Founding Father and politician

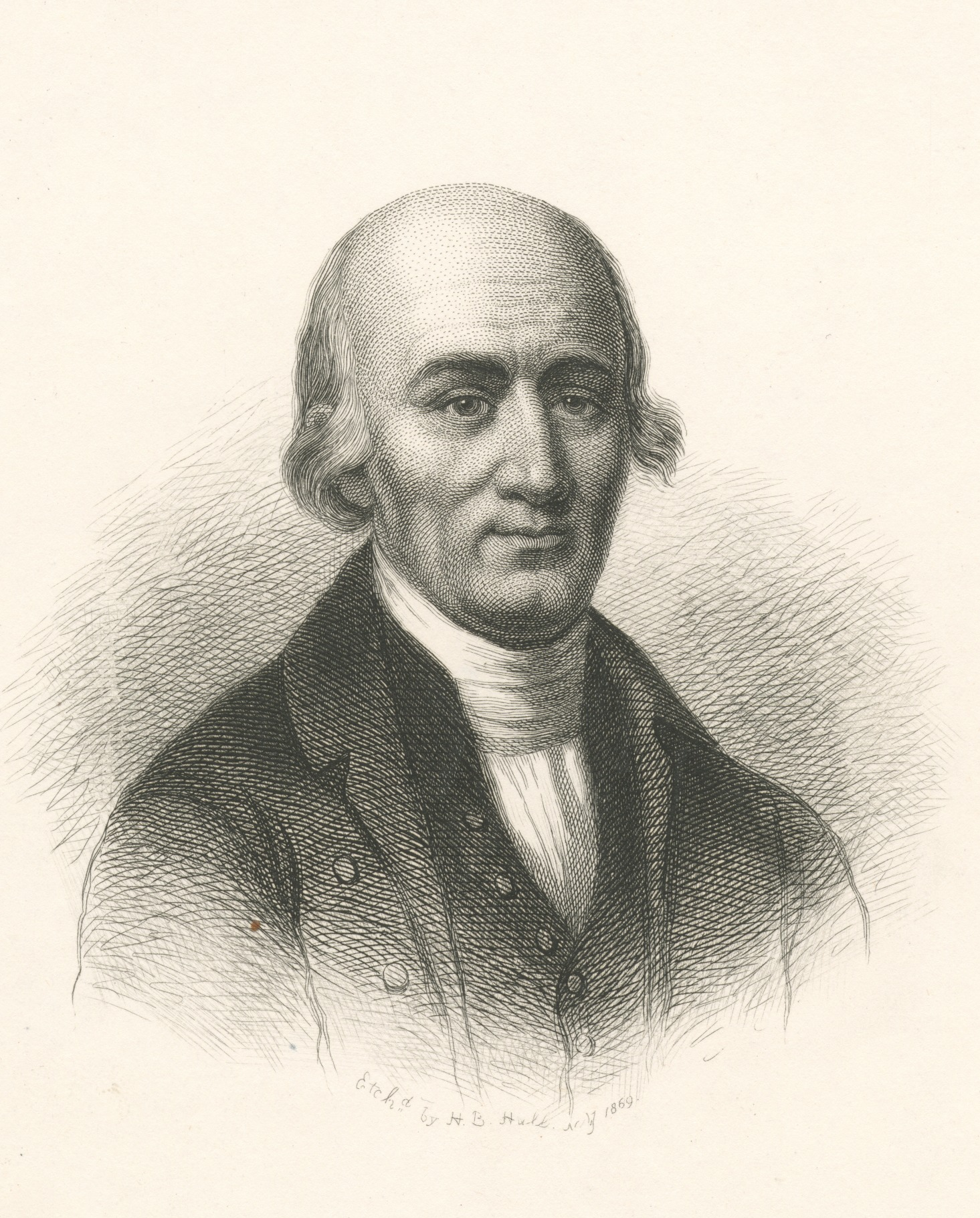
An illustration of Smith

Jonathan Bayard Smith (February 21, 1742 – June 16, 1812) was an American politician and merchant from Philadelphia who was one of the Founding Fathers of the United States. Smith served as a delegate for Pennsylvania to the Continental Congress in 1777 and 1778, where he signed the Articles of Confederation.

== Early life ==
Smith was born on February 21, 1742, in Philadelphia, Pennsylvania, to Mary Harrison and Samuel Smith. His father was a successful mercantile businessman in Portsmouth, New Hampshire, who had moved to Philadelphia. Smith graduated from Princeton in 1760 and joined his father in business. He was elected to the revived American Philosophical Society in 1768. His first marriage was to Susannah Bayard of Maryland. Together, they had one son, Samuel Harrison Smith, who founded the National Intelligencer newspaper.

== Revolutionary War ==
Smith became a member of the local committee of safety and in 1775 was made its secretary. He was elected a delegate to the Continental Congress in 1777, serving from April 4 of that year until November 1778. While in Congress, Smith endorsed the Articles of Confederation for Pennsylvania. He resigned from the Continental Congress to assist in the defense of Philadelphia in 1778. Having advocated taking up arms (a sometimes unpopular stance in largely Quaker Pennsylvania) he also joined the militia, becoming a lieutenant colonel of John Bayard's regiment and serving in the Brandywine campaign.

== Later work ==
After his congressional career, Smith returned his attention to business, but remained active in civic affairs. In 1778 he became a member of the Court of Common Pleas. He became a great promoter of education and in 1779 was one of the founders and a trustee of the "University of the State of Pennsylvania". In 1795, when it merged with two other schools to become the University of Pennsylvania, Smith became a trustee of the new school, serving until his death. He also served as a trustee for his alma mater, Princeton, for thirty years. Smith served in other fraternal and civic organizations. He became an alderman in Philadelphia, a grand master of the Masons, and a member of the American Philosophical Society.

Smith died at his residence in Philadelphia in 1812 and was buried in the Second Presbyterian Church Graveyard. In 1867, his remains were reinterred to Mount Vernon Cemetery.
