= Mount Vernon Cemetery (Philadelphia) =

Cemetery in Philadelphia, Pennsylvania

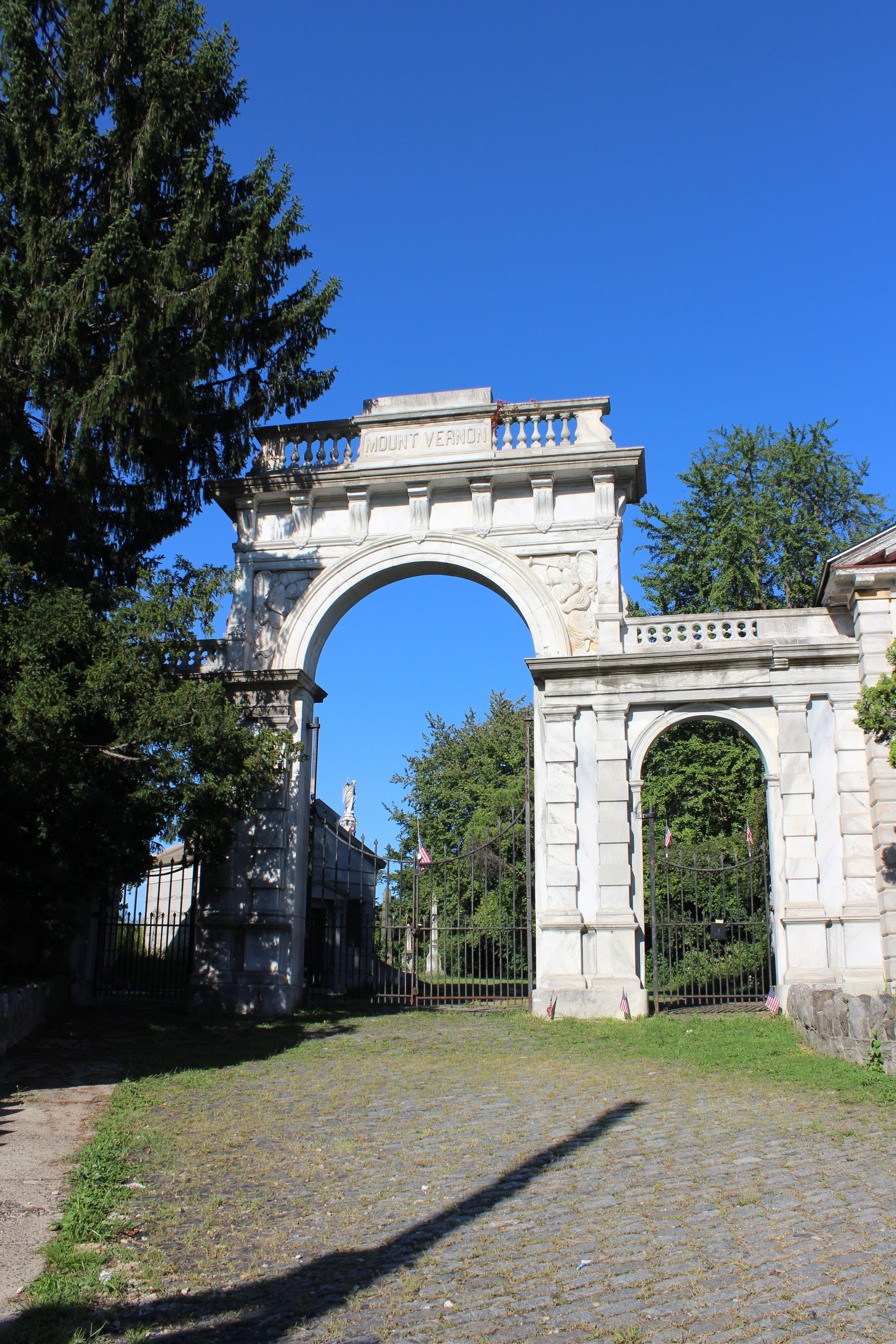
- Mount Vernon Cemetery Gatehouse
- Interactive map of Mount Vernon Cemetery

Details
- Established: 1856
- Location: 3499 West Lehigh Avenue, Philadelphia, Pennsylvania
- Country: United States
- Coordinates: 39°59′58″N 75°11′06″W
- Type: private
- Size: 27 acres
- No. of graves: 33,000
- Website: https://www.mountvernoncemetery.org/
- Find a Grave: Mount Vernon Cemetery

Mount Vernon Cemetery is a historic rural cemetery located at 3499 West Lehigh Avenue in the East Falls neighborhood of Philadelphia, Pennsylvania. It was established in 1856, is 27 acres in size and contains approximately 33,000 graves. It was neglected for decades by an absentee landlord. No plots have been sold since 1968, it was not open to the public, many graves fell into disrepair and the cemetery became heavily overgrown. In 2021, a Philadelphia judge ordered the cemetery be placed in conservatorship due to neglect.

== History ==
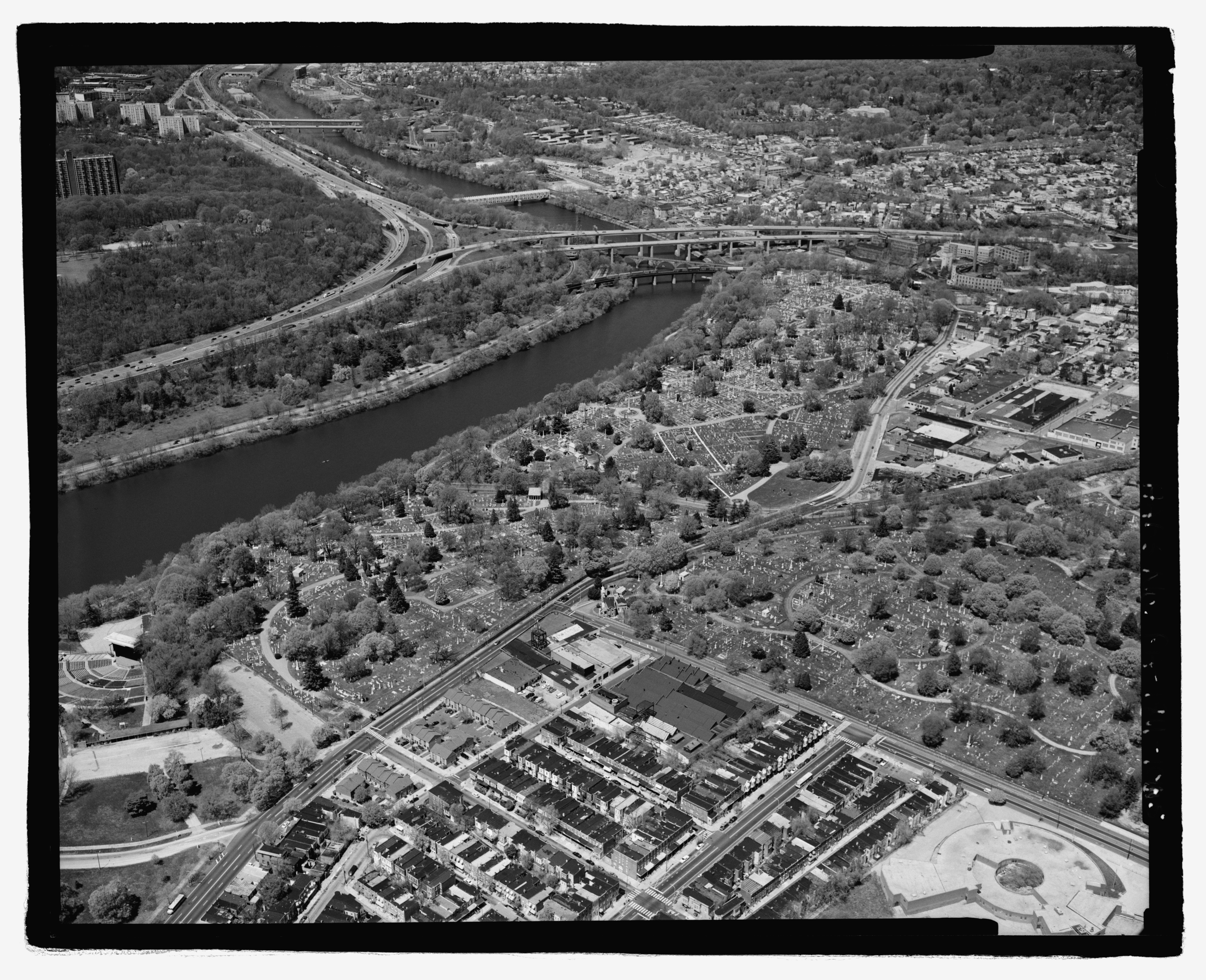
Aerial view showing Mount Vernon Cemetery on the right and nearby Laurel Hill Cemetery on the left

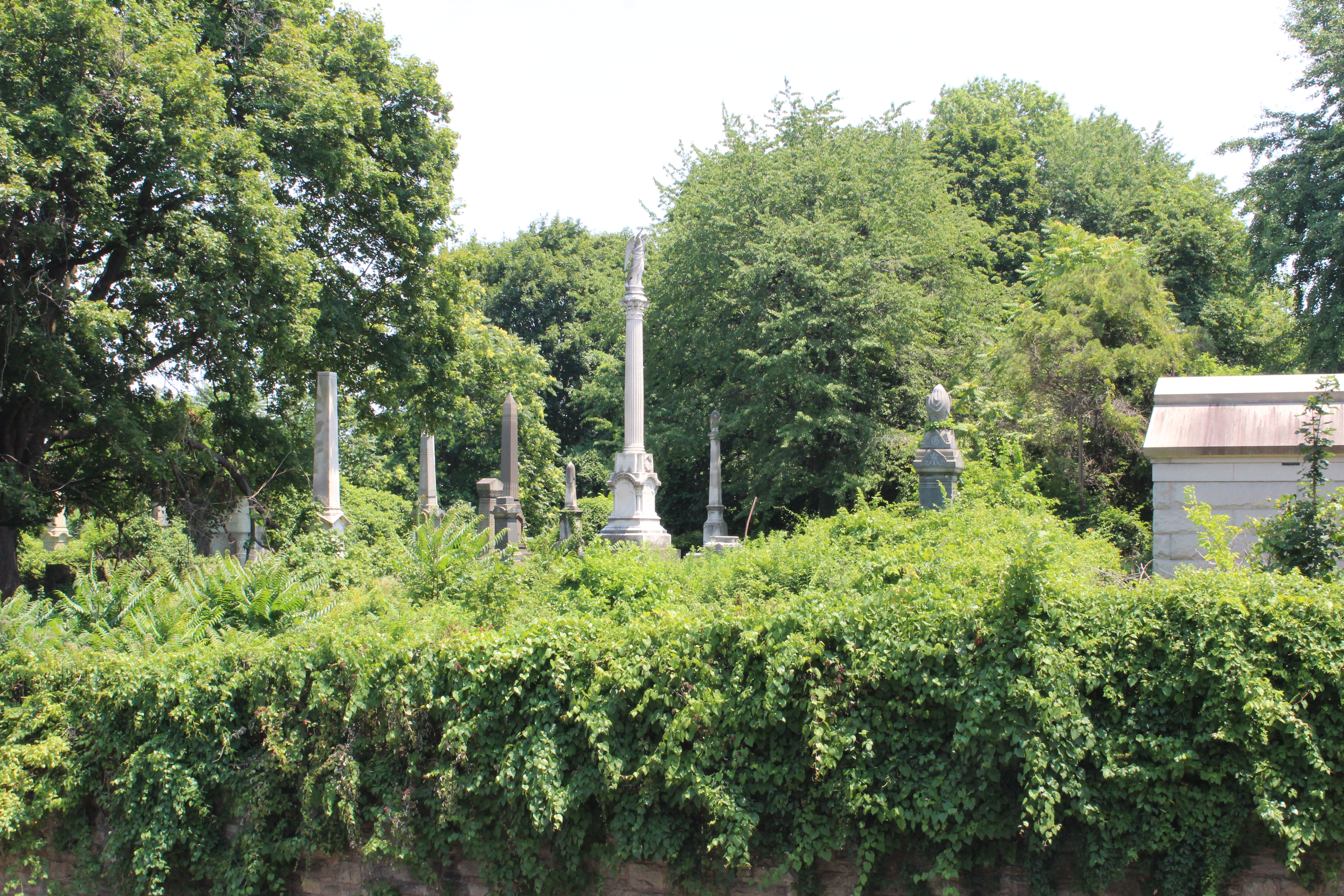
Overgrown monuments in Mount Vernon Cemetery as viewed from Laurel Hill Cemetery

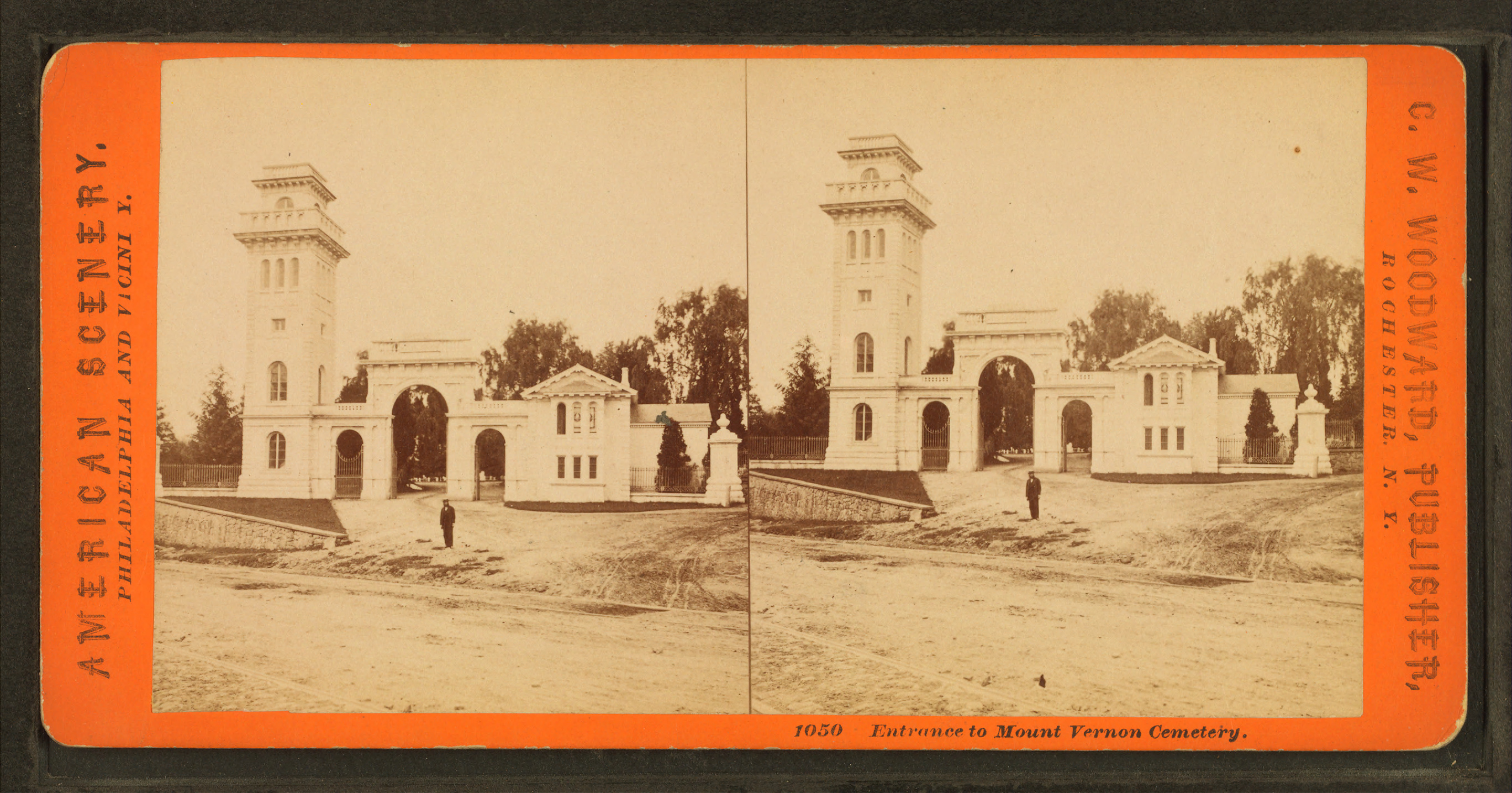
Entrance to Mount Vernon cemetery from Robert N. Dennis collection of stereoscopic views

The cemetery was established on February 28, 1856, is located directly across Ridge Avenue from Laurel Hill Cemetery, and contains approximately 33,000 graves.

The property was originally part of the colonial estate of Robert Ralston named Mount Peace. Another portion of the estate was purchased by the Oddfellows organization for Mount Peace Cemetery.

John Notman, the architect of Laurel Hill Cemetery's Italianate gatehouse was hired to design a larger and grander gatehouse for Mount Vernon Cemetery which was completed in 1858.

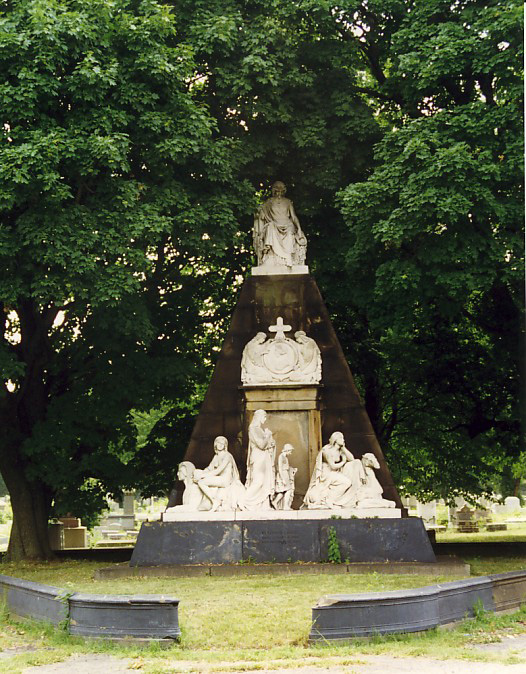
Gardel Memorial in 2006

In 1864, the Gardel Memorial was added to Mount Vernon. It is a memorial to Julia Hawks Gardel, the principal of a female seminary in Philadelphia, who died in 1859 while traveling in Syria. Her husband, Bertrand Gardel, commissioned Belgian sculptor Guillaume Geefs to create a 25-foot pyramid made of sandstone, marble and imported granite. The front of the pyramid is adorned with large marble statues which represent the continents of Asia, Europe and Africa to depict Julia's love of travel. Two statues above the pyramid door depict Hope and Faith holding a carved relief of Julia. The statue atop the pyramid represents America surrounded by emblems of the physical sciences. The memorial cost $36,000 which is the equivalent of about $2 million in current dollars. Bertrand Gardel died in 1895 and is interred in the vault beneath the memorial with his wife.

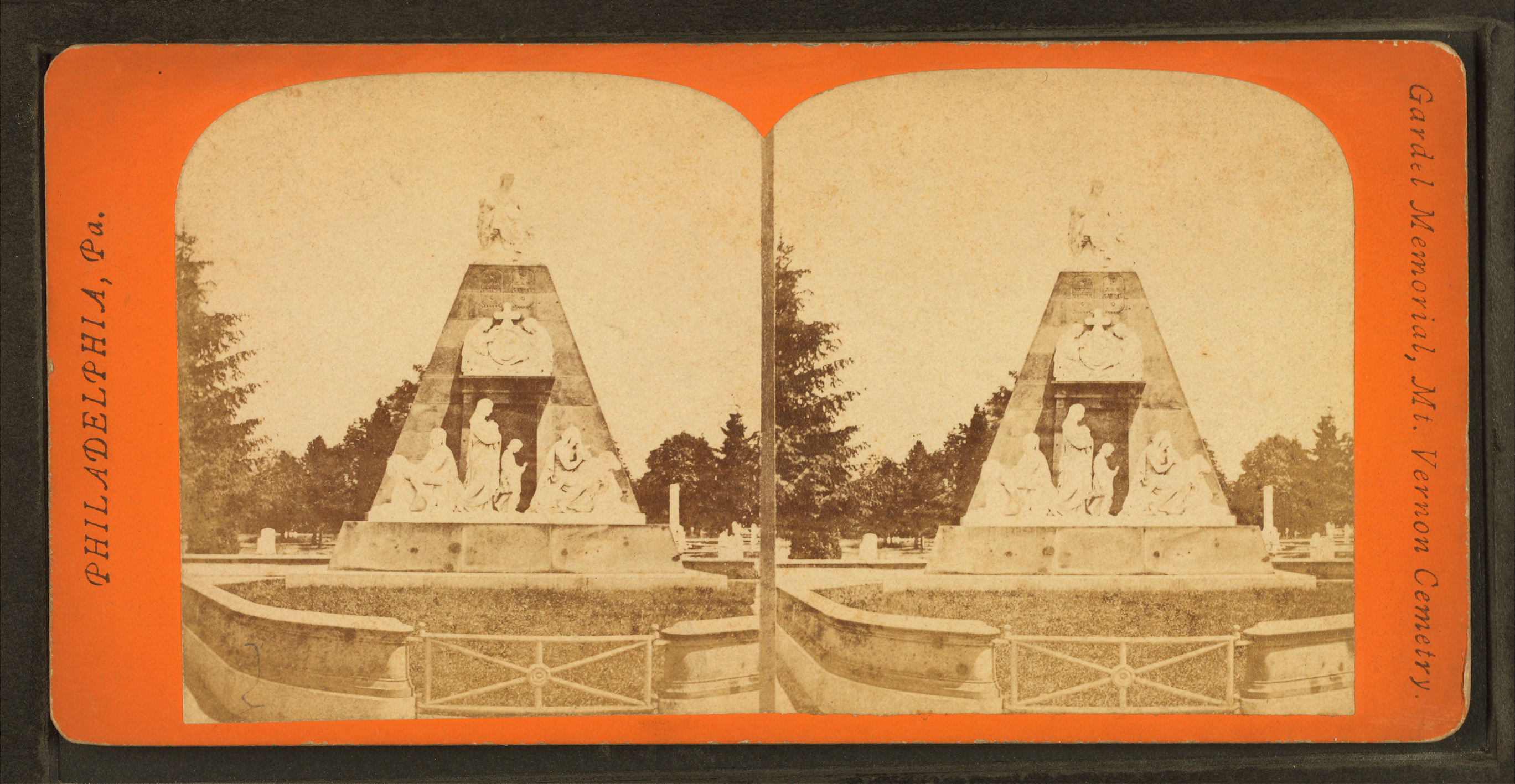
Gardel Memorial from Robert N. Dennis collection of stereoscopic views

In 1867, the Second Presbyterian Church burial ground on Arch Street was closed and 2,500 bodies were reinterred at Mount Vernon many from the 1700s including several Revolutionary War heroes.

The Drew family plot at Mount Vernon contains generations of the Barrymore family. The family lot was originally located in Glenwood Cemetery but was moved to Mount Vernon when Glenwood Cemetery was closed. John Barrymore left in his will that he wished to be buried in the Drew family plot but was originally interred in Calvary Cemetery in Los Angeles, California. In 1980, his son John Drew Barrymore had his father's remains removed from the family mausoleum, cremated and reinterred in Mount Vernon Cemetery. His grave was unmarked until 1992, when fans had a stone installed which had engraved upon it, "Alas poor Yorick" in a reference to his stage performance of Hamlet.

=== Ownership change in 1973 ===
Joseph Dinsmore Murphy, a lawyer from Washington D.C., took over ownership of the cemetery in 1973 after inheriting it from his father. The cemetery had not sold any plots since 1968 and over the years became heavily overgrown. Many graves deteriorated, and some were looted for scrap metal. Mount Vernon was not accessible to the public, as the owner mandated that appointments for visitation be scheduled 24 hours in advance, exclusively for people with a family plot in the cemetery.

On 1 May 2020, the Philadelphia Community Development Coalition petitioned to be appointed conservator of the property due to its abandoned and neglected condition. A Philadelphia judge agreed and placed Mount Vernon temporarily in the hands of the Coalition the following year. Throughout 2023, volunteers helped clear large amounts of overgrowth. As part of the court process, the cemetery was listed on Zillow for $1 million in July 2024 to see if there were any potential buyers.

== Notable burials ==
- John Barrymore (1882–1942), stage, screen and radio actor
- Maurice Barrymore (1849–1905), stage actor
- George C. Burling (1834–1885), Union Army officer during the U.S. Civil War
- John Carson (1752–1794), physician
- Georgiana Drew (1856–1893), stage actress and comedian
- John Drew (1827–1862), stage actor and theatre manager
- John Drew, Jr. (1853–1927), stage actor
- Louisa Lane Drew (1820–1897), actress and theatre owner
- Louise Drew (1882–1954), stage actress
- Sidney Drew (1863–1913), member of the Mr. and Mrs. Sidney Drew comedy team
- Sidney Rankin Drew (1891–1918), actor and film director
- Peter Stephen Du Ponceau (1760–1844), linguist, philosopher and jurist
- Christian Febiger (1749–1796), American Revolutionary War commander
- Charles Albert Fechter (1824–1879), actor
- Charlie Householder (1854–1913), professional baseball player
- William Churchill Houston (1746–1788), New Jersey delegate to the Continental Congress
- William M. Ireland (? – 1891), one of the founders of the National Grange of the Order of Patrons of Husbandry
- Samuel Jaudon (1796–1874), banker and businessman
- Lawrence Johnson (1801–1860), printing stereotyper and type-founder
- Judy Lewis (1935–2011), actress, writer, producer and therapist
- Henry Myers (1858–1895), professional baseball player
- Horace Phillips (1853–1896), major league baseball manager
- Lawrence Saint (1885–1961), stained glass artist
- Maria Louise Sanford (1836–1920), educator
- Alfred J. Sellers (1836–1908), Medal of Honor recipient
- Bill Sharsig (1855–1902), Major League Baseball co-owner and general manager
- Jonathan Bayard Smith (1742–1812), Pennsylvania delegate to the Continental Congress
- John P. Van Leer (1834–1862), Union Army officer
- Jake Virtue (1865–1943), professional baseball player
- Pelatiah Webster (1726–1795), colonial merchant and author of short essays on finances and the government of the United States
