= Bucklen Theatre =

- Formerly listed on the U.S. National Register of Historic Places
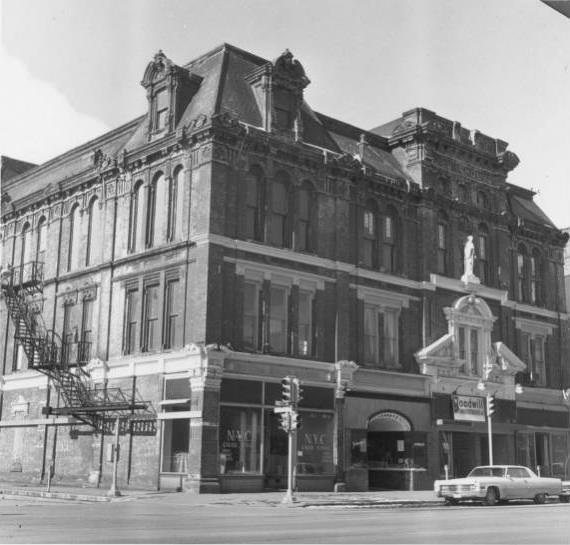
- Bucklen Opera House when it still existed. Courtesy of the Elkhart Public Library.
- Location: S. Main and Harrison Sts., Elkhart, Indiana
- Area: 0.3 acres (0.12 ha)
- Built: 1883
- Architect: Smith, Mortimer L.
- NRHP reference No.: 76000021

Significant dates
- Added to NRHP: October 8, 1976
- Removed from NRHP: November 21, 1986

Bucklen Theatre, also known as the Elkhart Opera House, was a historic theatre located at Elkhart, Indiana. It was built in 1883, and was a three-story, five-bay, red brick building. It was demolished in 1986.

It was added to the National Register of Historic Places in 1976 and delisted in 1986.
