= Georgiana Drew =

American actress (1856–1893)

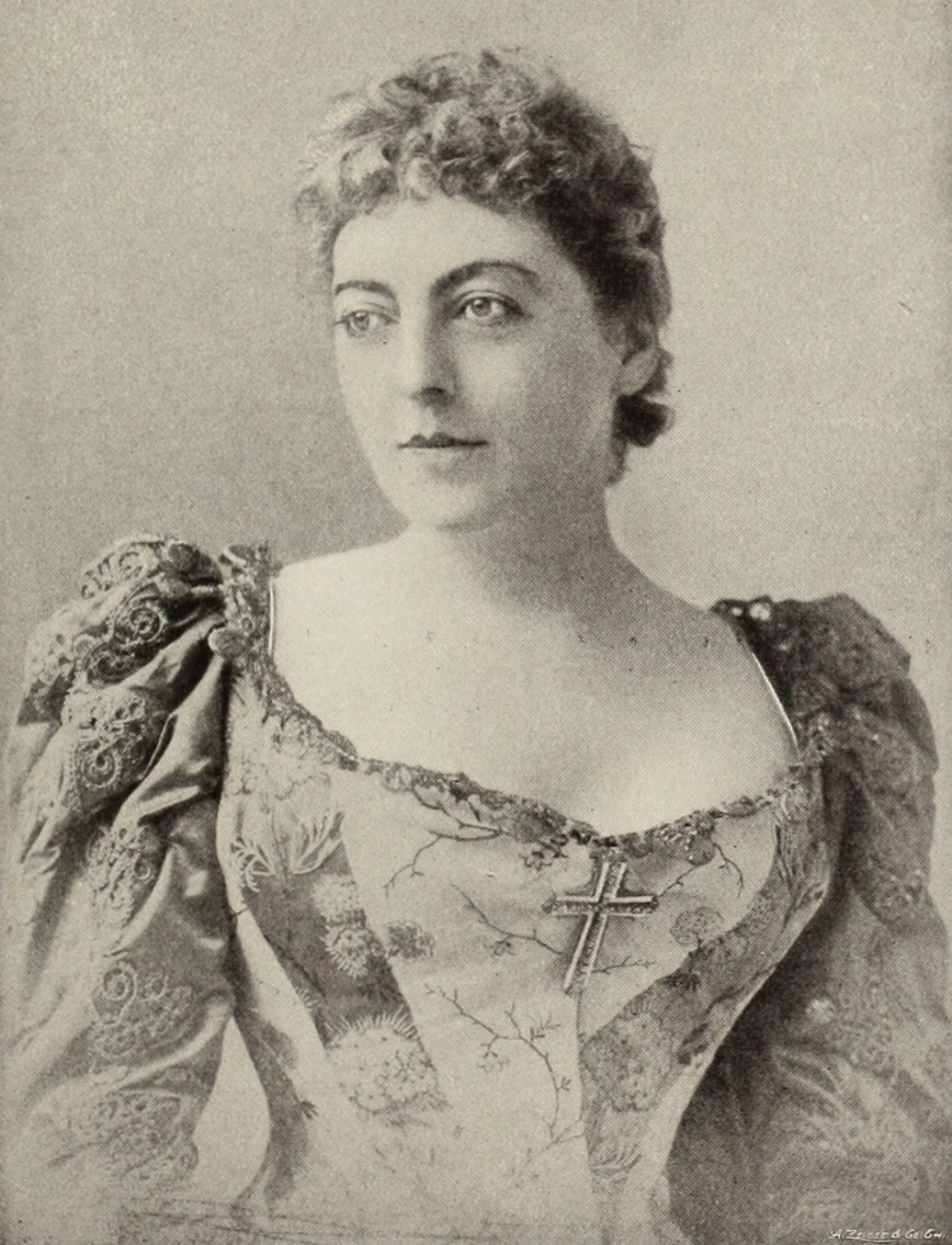
- Drew in the 1880s
- Born: Georgiana Emma Drew; July 11, 1856; Philadelphia, Pennsylvania, U.S.
- Died: July 2, 1893 (aged 36); Santa Barbara, California, U.S.
- Resting place: Mount Vernon Cemetery
- Other name: Georgie Drew Barrymore
- Occupation: Actress
- Years active: 1872–1893
- Spouse: Maurice Barrymore (m. 1876)
- Children: Lionel Barrymore; Ethel Barrymore; John Barrymore
- Parent(s): John Drew; Louisa Lane Drew
- Relatives: Louisa Drew Mendum (sister); John Drew Jr. (brother); Sidney Drew (brother)
- Family: Barrymore family Drew family

Georgiana Emma Drew (July 11, 1856 – July 2, 1893), a.k.a. Georgie Drew Barrymore, was an American stage actress and comedian and a member of the Barrymore-Drew acting family.

== Life and career ==
Georgiana Emma Drew was born in Philadelphia, Pennsylvania on July 11, 1856, to actors, John Drew and Louisa Lane. Her maternal grandparents, Frederick Lane and Eliza Trentner, and great-grandparents, Thomas Haycraft Lane and Louisa Rouse, were all actors as well. She had two brothers, John Jr. and Sidney, and a sister Louisa, who were all actors.

She made her theatrical debut in 1872 in The Ladies' Rattle, at The Arch Theatre, which was managed by her mother. She followed John Jr. to New York City, where she acted in many Broadway hits, such as Pique and As You Like It.

John Jr. had starred in a production of Hamlet, where he met 26 year old Oxford University graduate and English actor, Herbert Arthur Chamberlayne Blyth, more commonly known under his stage name, Maurice Barrymore. The two became friends and John Jr. brought Barrymore home to meet his family. Drew and Barrymore began courting and would marry on December 31, 1876. This would unite the two established theatrical families - the Drews and the Barrymores - and contribute to a lineage that would dominate American stage acting for decades. This union is frequently cited by theatre historians as foundational to the emergence of the Barrymore acting dynasty in American cultural history. Their descendants continued in the performing arts across multiple generations.

Drew and Barrymore subsequently had three children (two boys and a daughter), all famous film, radio, television stars: Lionel, Ethel Mae, and John. When Drew became pregnant with their first child, the couple returned to Philadelphia. After Lionel was born in 1878, Barrymore headed west with an acting troupe, while Drew remained in Philadelphia with her mother. Her second child, Ethel Mae, was born the following year and their third, John, was born in 1882.

According to a 2004 A&E Biography piece, the marriage, happy at first, became rocky as Maurice indulged in numerous affairs. Georgie even filed for divorce, but they reconciled. He asked her to tour with him and Helena Modjeska in a play he wrote. Learning that he and Helena had resumed their romance, Georgie, who had been given ownership of the play by Maurice, closed it. Helena's husband, its producer, sued her. The real reason for Georgie's actions never got into the press.

In 1890, she had a great success in The Senator co-starring William H. Crane and, in 1891, as one of the two widows in Mr. Wilkinson's Widows. Her stage career at this time was being managed by a young up-and-coming producer named Charles Frohman. Frohman would play a big part in managing the early careers of her three children, as well as her brother John Drew.

== Death ==
In December 1891, illness forced her to leave the stage. In 1893, she traveled to the Bahamas with Ethel at a doctor's suggestion. While the climate seemed to improve her health temporarily, she was diagnosed with an advanced case of tuberculosis. She died a few weeks later in Santa Barbara, California. Barrymore died on July 2, 1893, nine days before her 37th birthday. She was originally interred at Glenwood Cemetery, but reinterred at Mount Vernon Cemetery in Philadelphia.

Reportedly, her last words, which she kept repeating, were, "Oh my poor kids! What shall ever become of them?", as told by Ethel years later while the two were on the steamer heading to Panama, and as related to her son John, in the 1920s, by an elderly woman who had been staying at the same boarding house in Santa Barbara as Georgie and Ethel. It was 13-year-old Ethel's responsibility to see that her mother's remains were returned to Philadelphia for burial by Mrs Drew and Maurice, who met Ethel's train in Chicago. In 1893, this coast-to-coast journey would have lasted a week.

Drew's mother, Louisa Lane, took responsibility for the three children, as Barrymore remained on tour. Eventually Louisa would give up their Philadelphia residence and move into a boardinghouse. The children were sent to live with their Uncle Googan and his family.

== Sources ==
- Encyclopædia Britannica
