= Arch Street Theatre =

Former theatre in Philadelphia, Pennsylvania, US

Coordinates: 39.953380°N 75.154486°W

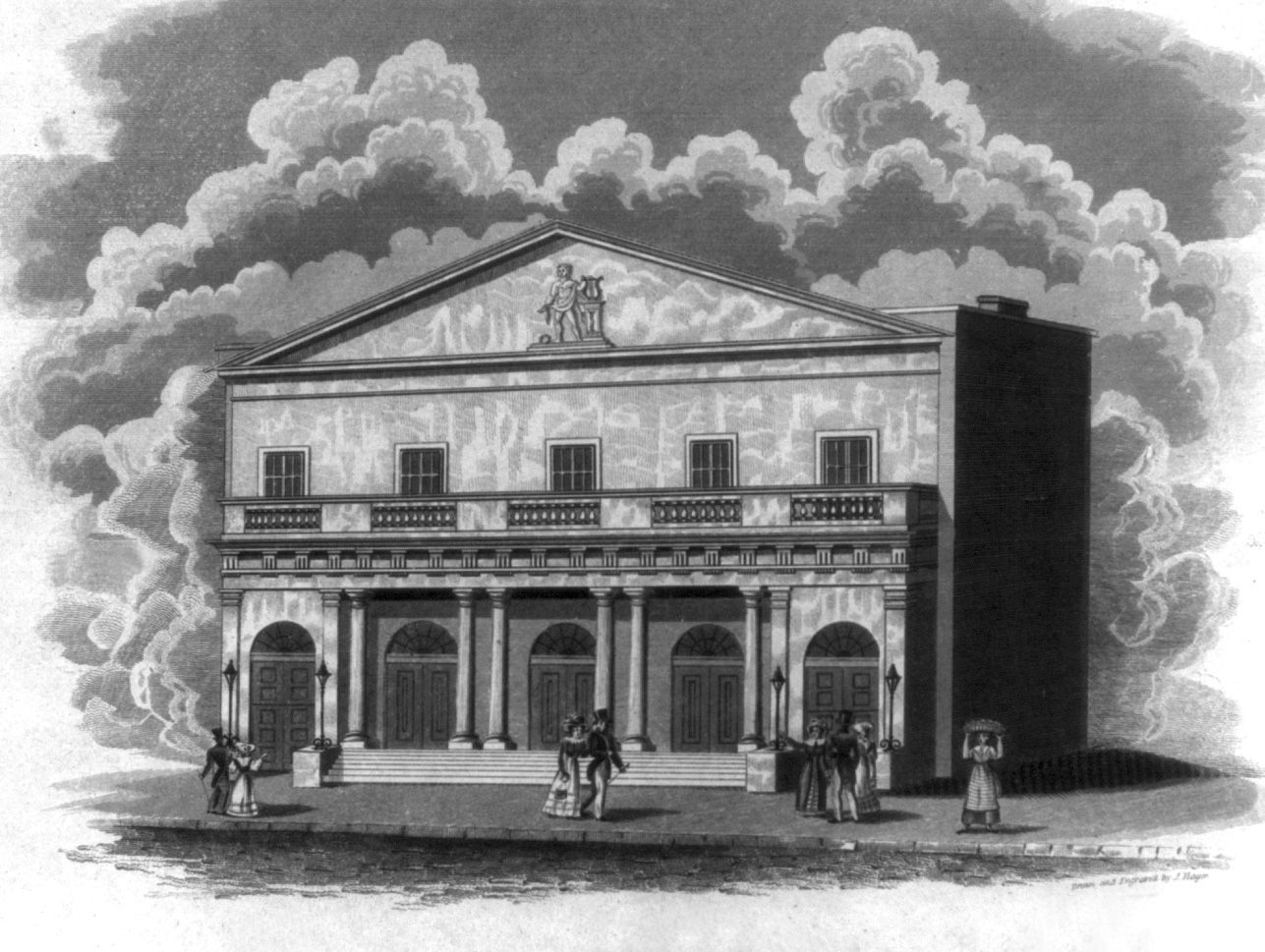
The Arch Street Theatre, c. 1850

The Arch Street Theatre, popularly referred to as The Arch, was one of three Philadelphia-based theaters for plays during the 19th century; the other two were the Walnut Street Theatre (still standing in 2024), and the Chestnut Street Theatre. The Arch Street Theatre opened on October 1, 1828, under the management of prominent early 19th-century actor William B. Wood (1779–1861). The building's architect was John Haviland (1792–1852).

== History ==
=== 19th century ===
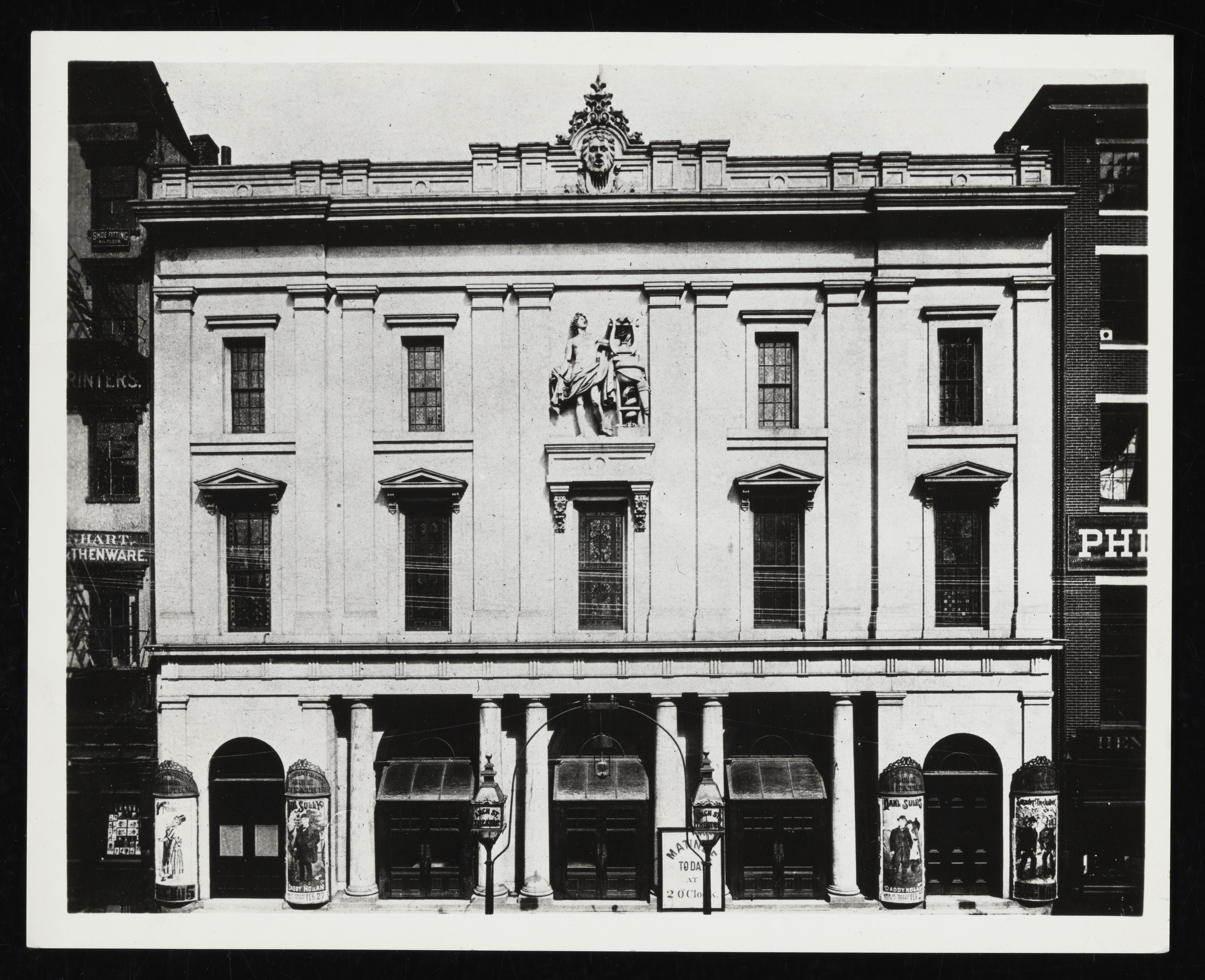
The second Arch Street Theatre in 1888

The building which housed the Arch Street Theatre was located at 819 Arch Street, between 6th and 7th Streets in Center City, Philadelphia Performers at the longtime venue over its 108 years of history included Fanny Lily Gipsey Davenport, Joseph Jefferson, and Charlotte Cushman, others. John Wilkes Booth (1838–1865) joined the theatre's stock company in 1857 and played for a full season. He appeared occasionally at the Arch during the 1850s and early 1860s.

During the 1830s, prominent Shakespearean actor Edwin Forrest (1806–1872), played many successful roles at "The Arch", and several original plays written at his request debuted there.

In 1832, the Arch Street Theatre of Philadelphia had an entire resident company of American actors, which was a first for American theater companies. The managers were William Forrest, William Duffy, and William Jones. The company also included James E. Murdoch (1811–1893).

In 1860, the stockholders of the Arch suggested that Louisa Lane Drew (1820–1897), (and wife of her third husband, actor John Drew Sr (1827–1862), should assume the Arch Street management, and in 1861 the theatre was opened under the name "Mrs. John Drew's Arch Street Theatre", at the beginning of the American Civil War (1861–1865). Louisa Lane Drew was the grandmother of ryLionel, Ethel, and John Barrymore, and matriarch / ancestor of the famous Barrymore-Drew acting family, which extended across several generations from the 18th, 19th, 20th, and now even to the 21st centuries. During the third season under Drew's management at Arch Street, Lester Wallack (1820–1888), E. L. Davenport (1816–1877), and Edwin Booth (1833–1893), all appeared and acted at "The Arch".

In the summer of 1863, the theatre was partially pulled down and rebuilt / renovated with much more luxurious furnishings such as red plush seats and crystal chandeliers from the stage to the original stone front façade; the seating capacity was one thousand, nine-hundred eleven (1,911).

By 1875, the theatre became the venue for the first American performance of a work by British musical composers and playwrights partnership team Gilbert and Sullivan (W.S. Gilbert (1836–1911) and Arthur Sullivan (1842–1900), when another actress and theatre manager / producer Alice Oates (1849–1887), staged an unauthorized and approximate performance of their work Trial by Jury here.

After Mrs. Drew's departure from management after over three decades in 1892, the stature of Philadelphia's Arch Street Theatre unfortunately slowly declined. By 1898, Moishe ("Morris") Finkel (c.1850–1904), rented the building and presented Yiddish language (German / Hebrew) theater for Jewish patrons for several months, including one week of performances by Keni Liptzin (1856–1918). The prolific Yiddish theatre composer Joseph Brody (c.1876/77-1937), recently arrived from the Russian Empire (Russia), got his American start there as well. However, Finkel soon abandoned the project and the Arch returned to vaudeville and burlesque.

=== 20th century ===
In 1909, Mordechai ("Mike") Thomashefsky took over the Arch and presented both vaudeville of music and comedy along with Yiddish theatre until his death a quarter-century later in 1932.

The Arch Street Theater was rented out in 1921 as a hall for Jewish High Holiday services.

The historic Arch Street Theatre was unfortunately demolished after 108 years in 1936. Prior to its demolition, it was the second-oldest theatre in the country, next to the nearby Walnut Street Theatre, still standing in 2024.
