= Ethel Barrymore =

American actress (1879–1959)

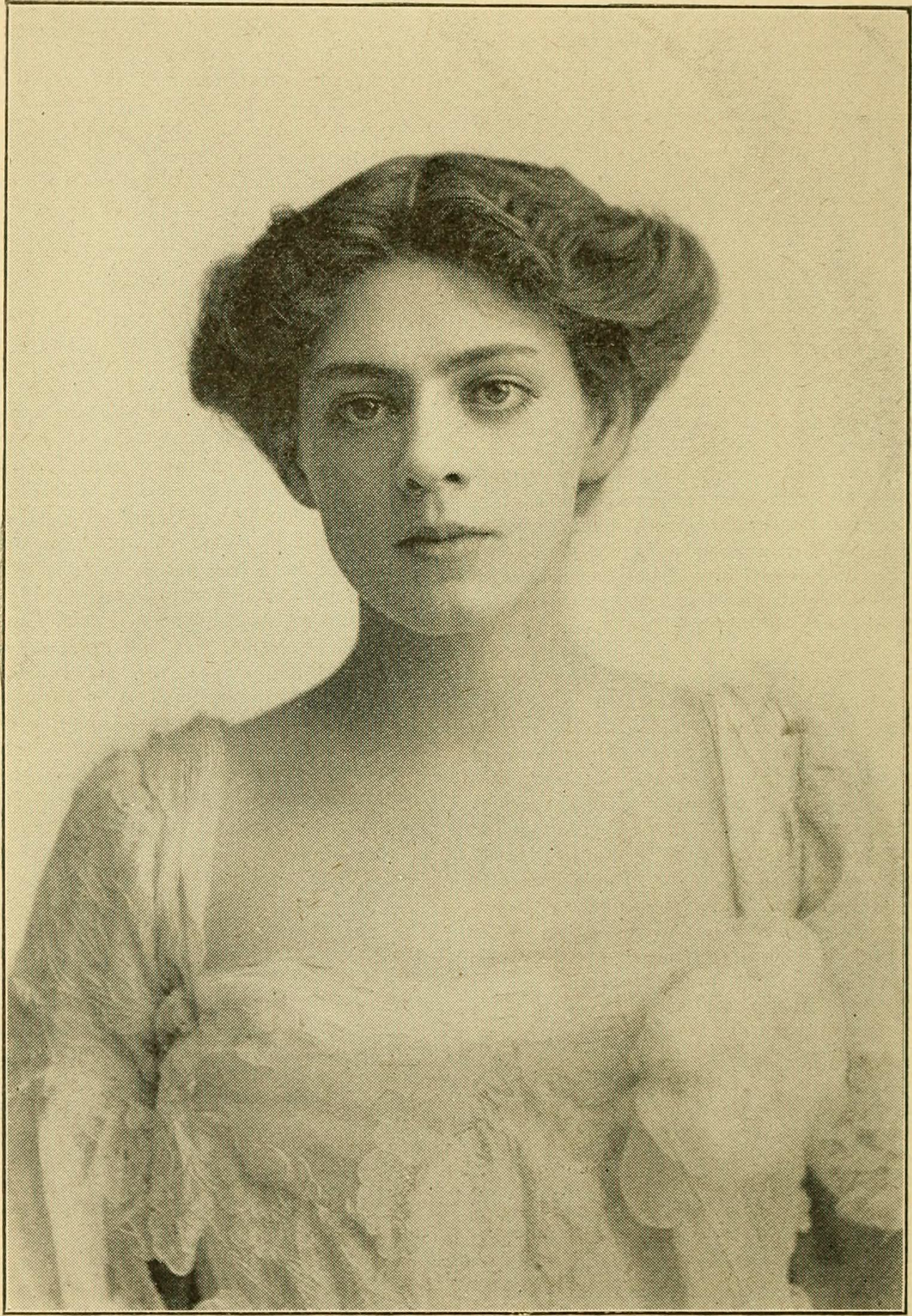
- Barrymore in 1896
- Born: Ethel Mae Blyth; August 15, 1879; Philadelphia, Pennsylvania, U.S.
- Died: June 18, 1959 (aged 79); Los Angeles, California, U.S.
- Occupation: Actress
- Years active: 1895–1957
- Spouse: Russell Griswold Colt (m. 1909; div. 1923)
- Children: 3
- Parent(s): Maurice Barrymore; Georgiana Drew
- Family: Barrymore; Drew

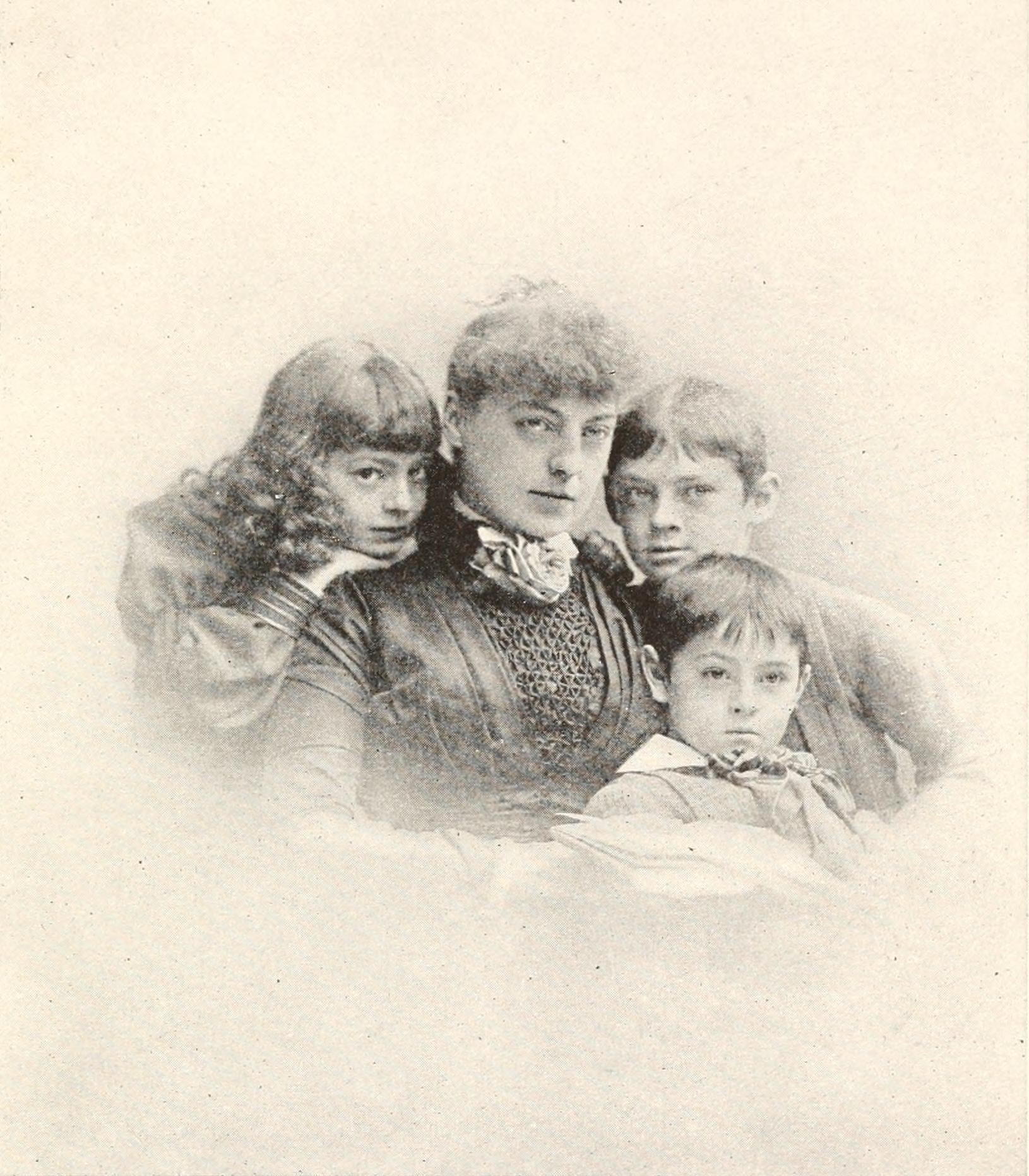
Ethel with her brothers and their mother in 1890.

Ethel Barrymore (born Ethel Mae Blyth; August 15, 1879 – June 18, 1959) was an American actress and a member of the Barrymore-Drew family of actors. Barrymore was a stage, screen and radio actress whose career spanned six decades, and was regarded as "The First Lady of the American Theatre". She received four nominations for the Academy Award for Best Supporting Actress, winning for None but the Lonely Heart (1944).

== Early life ==
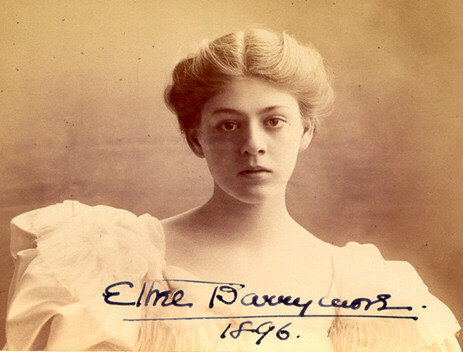
Barrymore, 1896

Barrymore was born Ethel Mae Blyth in Philadelphia, the second child of the actors Maurice Barrymore (whose real name was Herbert Blythe) and Georgiana Drew. She was named for her father's favorite character in William Makepeace Thackeray's The Newcomes.

She was the sister of actors John and Lionel Barrymore, the aunt of actor John Drew Barrymore and great-aunt of actress Drew Barrymore. She was a granddaughter of actress and theater manager Louisa Lane Drew and niece of Broadway matinée idol John Drew, Jr. and Vitagraph Studios stage and screen star Sidney Drew. She spent her childhood in Philadelphia and attended Roman Catholic schools there. In 1884, the family moved to England for two years. Barrymore's father exhibited a play and starred on stage plays at London's Haymarket Theatre. Returning to the U.S. in 1886, her father took her to her first baseball game, which established her lifelong love of baseball.

== Career ==
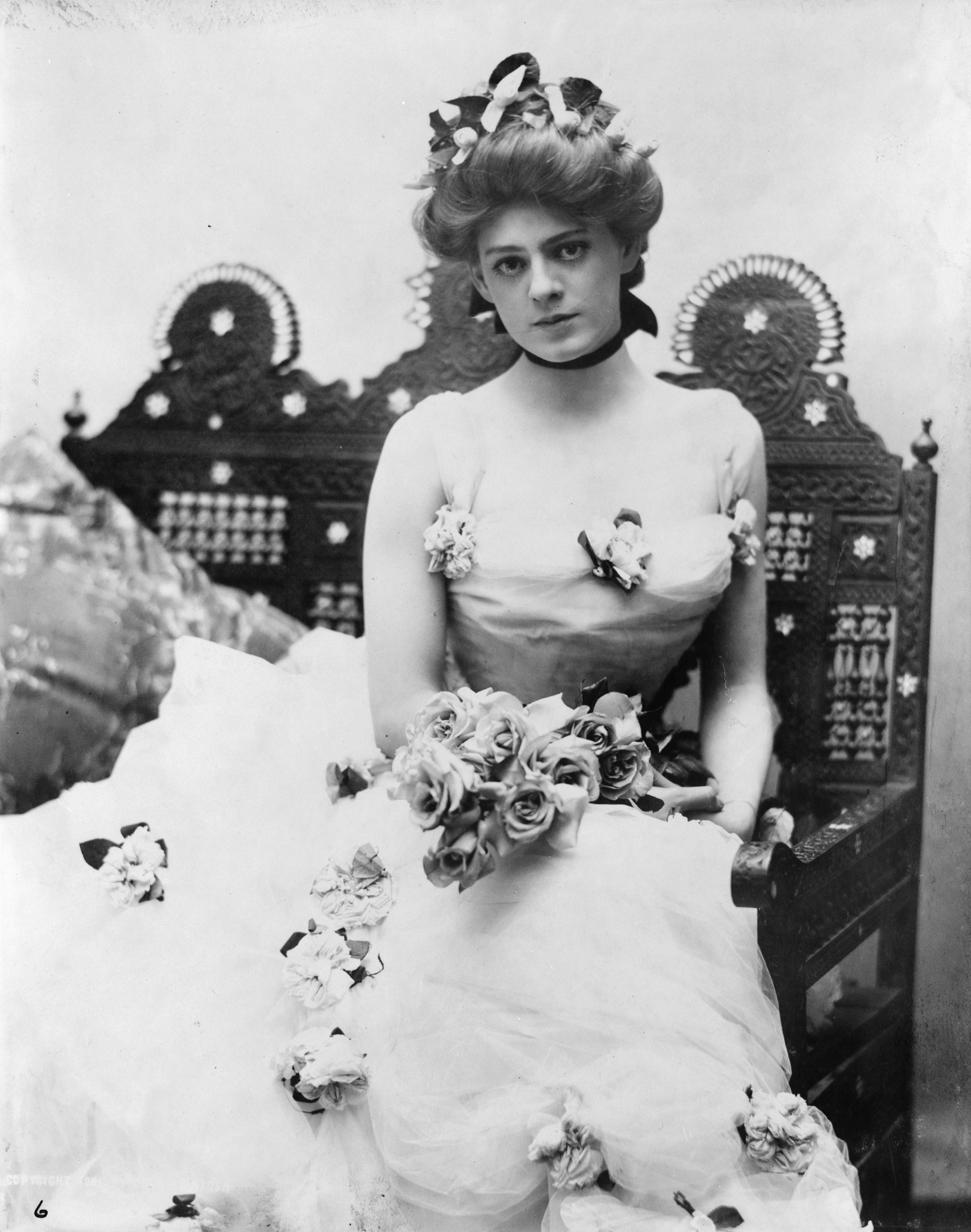
Barrymore in 1901 in one of the costumes from Captain Jinks of the Horse Marines

In the summer of 1893, Barrymore was in the company of her mother Georgie, who had been ailing from tuberculosis and took a curative sabbatical to Santa Barbara, California, not far from where family friend Helena Modjeska had a retreat. Georgie did not recover and died in July 1893 at age 36. Essentially Ethel's and Lionel's childhood ended when Georgie died; they were forced to go to work in their teens with neither finishing high school. John, a few years younger, stayed with their grandmother and other relatives. Barrymore's first appearance on Broadway was in 1895, in a play called The Imprudent Young Couple which starred her uncle John Drew Jr. and Maude Adams. She appeared with Drew and Adams again in 1896 in Rosemary.

In 1897 Ethel went with William Gillette to London to play Miss Kittridge in Gillette's Secret Service. She was about to return to the States with Gillette's troupe when Henry Irving and Ellen Terry offered her the role of Annette in The Bells. A full London tour was on and, before it was over, Ethel created, on New Year's Day 1898, Euphrosine in Peter the Great at the Lyceum, the play having been written by Irving's son, Laurence. Men everywhere were smitten with Ethel, most notably Winston Churchill, who asked her to marry him. Not wishing to be a politician's wife, she refused. Winston, years later, married Clementine Hozier, who looked very much like Ethel. Winston and Ethel remained friends until the end of her life.

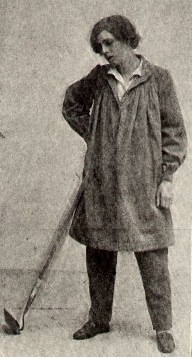
Barrymore playing the male character Carrots in a play of the same name, 1902

After her season in London, Ethel returned to the U.S. Charles Frohman cast her first in Catherine and then as Stella de Grex in His Excellency the Governor. After that, Frohman finally gave Ethel the role that would make her a star: Madame Trentoni in Captain Jinks of the Horse Marines, which opened at the Garrick Theatre in London's West End on February 4, 1901. Unbeknownst to Ethel, her father Maurice had witnessed the performance as an audience member and walked up to his daughter, congratulated her and gave her a big hug. It was the first and only time he saw her on stage professionally. When the tour concluded in Boston in June, she had out-drawn two of the most prominent actresses of her day, Mrs. Patrick Campbell and Minnie Maddern Fiske.

Following her triumph in Captain Jinks, Ethel gave sterling performances in many top-rate productions and it was in Thomas Raceward's Sunday that she uttered what would be her most famous line, "That's all there is, there isn't any more."

She portrayed Nora in A Doll's House by Ibsen (1905), and Juliet in Romeo and Juliet by Shakespeare (1922).

== Actors' Equity strike ==
Barrymore, along with friend Marie Dressler, was a strong supporter of the Actors' Equity Association and had a high-profile role in the 1919 strike. During the strike, Ethel and Lionel Barrymore starred in a benefit show staged by AEA at the Lexington Avenue Opera House. AEA came into being primarily to allow performers to have a bigger share in the profits of stage productions and to provide benefit to elderly or infirm actors. Barrymore's involvement in AEA may have been motivated by the fate of both of her parents, both long standing actors, her mother who had needed proper medical care and her father who required years of institutionalized care. Her support for the strike angered many producers and cost Barrymore her friendship with George M. Cohan, an actor, songwriter and producer.

Immediately following the strike she had one of her greatest stage triumphs in Déclassée by Zoe Akins. Her portrayal of the doomed heroine Lady Helen Haden ran for the entire 1919-1920 season at the Empire Theatre on Broadway, and was cited by Burns Mantle as one of the ten best plays for that year.

== 1920–1930s ==
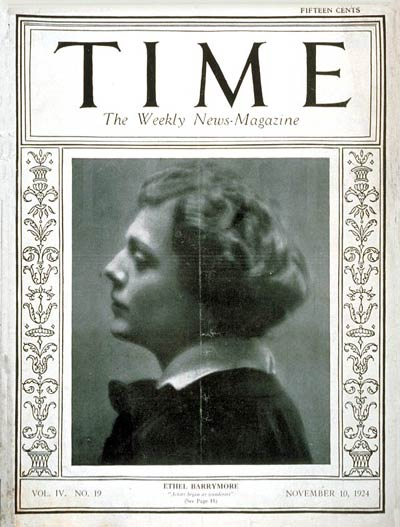
Time cover, November 10, 1924

In 1926, she scored one of her greatest successes as the sophisticated spouse of a philandering husband in W. Somerset Maugham's comedy, The Constant Wife (Maugham counted himself among her admirers, saying that during rehearsals for the play he had "fallen madly in love with her.") She starred in Rasputin and the Empress (1932), playing the czarina married to Czar Nicholas. In July 1934, she starred in the play Laura Garnett, by Leslie and Sewell Stokes, at Dobbs Ferry, New York.

After she became a stage star, she would often dismiss adoring audiences who kept demanding curtain calls by saying "That's all there is—there isn't any more!" This became a popular catch phrase in the 1920s and 1930s. Many references to it can be found in the media of the period, including the Laurel and Hardy 1933 film Sons of the Desert, and Arthur Train's 1930 Wall Street Crash novel Paper Profits. It is sometimes recalled on modern day radio stations annually every August 15 when Ethel's birthday is mentioned.

Barrymore was a baseball and boxing fan. Her admiration for boxing ended when she witnessed the brutality of the July 4, 1919, Dempsey/Willard fight in which Dempsey broke Willard's jaw and knocked out several of his teeth. Ethel vowed never to attend another boxing match, though she would later watch boxing on television.

In 1928, the Shuberts opened the Ethel Barrymore Theatre, which operates under that name to the present day.

In 1938, Ethel became the first artistic director of the Olney Theatre Center in Olney, Maryland.

== Film and broadcasting career ==
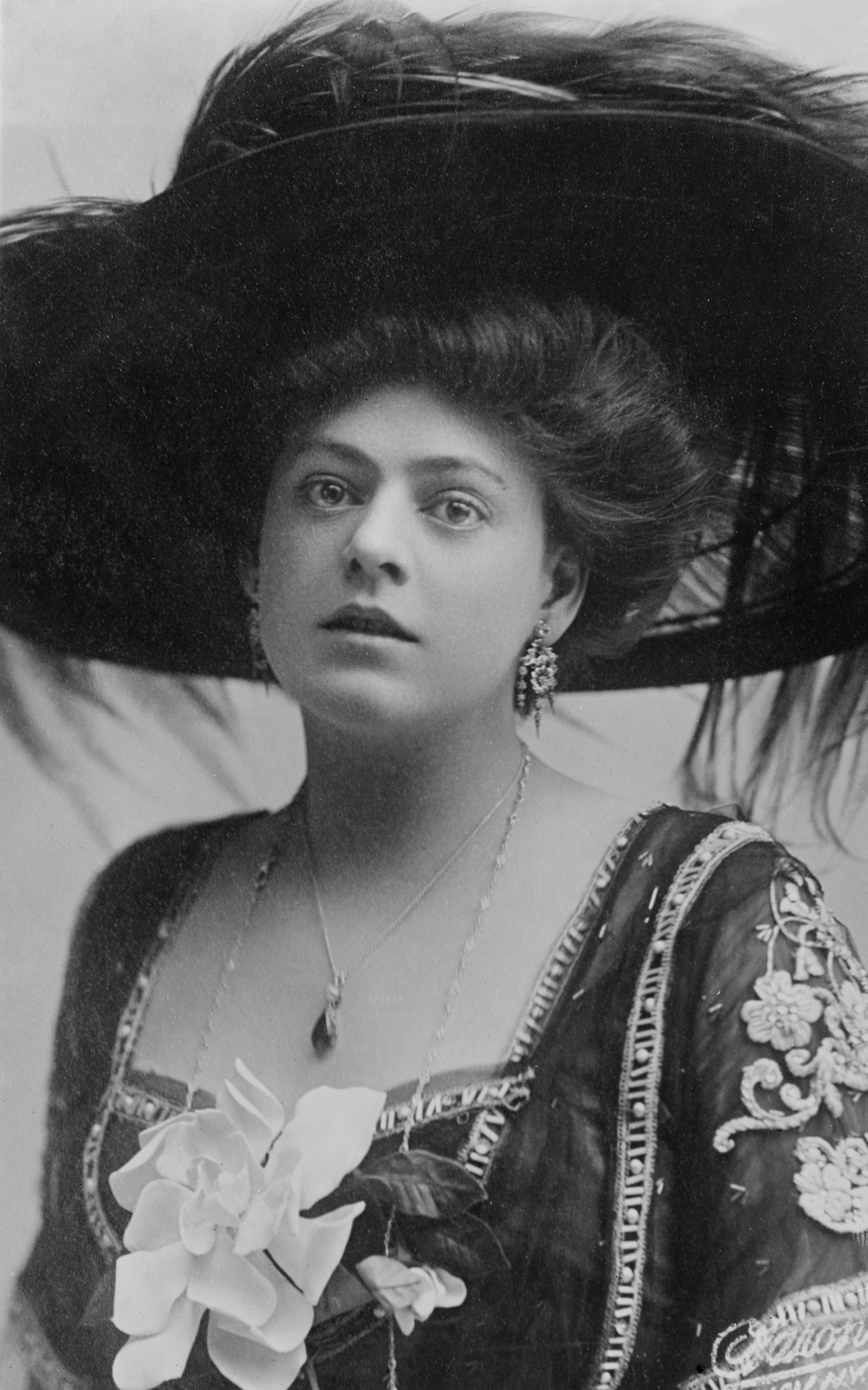
Barrymore, c. 1908

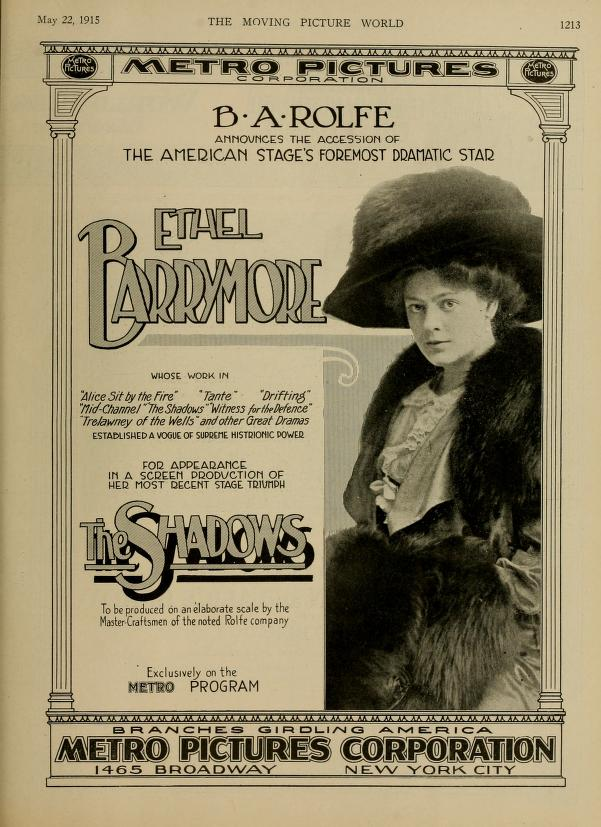
THE SHADOWS based on the play Barrymore was starring in, in 1915. This film was never produced but was all set to start filming when producer Charles Frohman died on the Lusitania. Hence the date on this advert is 15 days after Frohman's demise. The Frohman Company owned this story.

=== Film ===
Barrymore appeared in her first feature motion picture, The Nightingale, in 1914. Members of her family were already in pictures; uncle Sidney Drew, his wife Gladys Rankin, and Lionel had entered films in 1911 and John made his first feature in 1913 after having debuted in Lubin short films in 1912. She made 15 silent pictures between 1914 and 1919, most of them for the Metro Pictures studio. Most of these pictures were made on the East Coast, as her Broadway career and children came first. A few of her silent films have survived: for example, one reel from The Awakening of Helena Richie (1916) which survives at the Library of Congress, and The Call of Her People (1917) held at the George Eastman House.

The only two films that featured all three siblings—Ethel, John, and Lionel—were National Red Cross Pageant (1917) and Rasputin and the Empress (1932). The former film is now considered a lost film.

Barrymore won the Academy Award for Best Supporting Actress for her role in the film None but the Lonely Heart (1944) opposite Cary Grant, but made plain that she was not overly impressed by it.

She appeared in The Spiral Staircase (1946) directed by Robert Siodmak, The Paradine Case (1947) directed by Alfred Hitchcock, in which she was nominated for an Academy Award for Best Supporting Actress for both as well for the 1949 film Pinky. She played the repressed wife of Charles Laughton's character. Another important role of hers was in Portrait of Jennie (1948), and The Red Danube (1949), among others. Her last film appearance was in Johnny Trouble (1957).

=== Radio ===
Barrymore was heard on radio in 1923 when the first act of The Laughing Lady, in which she was appearing, was broadcast to an estimated 750,000 listeners.

Barrymore starred in Miss Hattie, described as "a short-lived situation comedy," on ABC in 1944–1945. In one episode, Barrymore's character was "asked by Rob Thompson to direct a play which the workers of his war plant are presenting in order to raise money for war bonds." Barrymore starred, along with Gene Kelly, in the June 1, 1949, episode of Suspense, entitled "To Find Help".

=== Television ===
Barrymore also made a number of television appearances in the 1950s, including one memorable encounter with comedian Jimmy Durante on NBC's All Star Revue on December 1, 1951, which is preserved on a kinescope. On October 2, 1952, Barrymore appeared as the mystery guest on the CBS quiz show What's My Line?, which has also been preserved on kinescope. In 1956, she hosted 14 episodes of the TV series Ethel Barrymore Theatre, produced by the DuMont Television Network and presented on the DuMont flagship station WABD just as the network was folding. Unfortunately none of the episodes were preserved on kinescope.

== Popular culture ==
In the romantic time travel film Somewhere in Time (1980), a photo of Barrymore wearing nun's habit from her 1928 play The Kingdom of God can be seen. Christopher Reeve plays a journalist rummaging through old theater albums at a large Michigan hotel. He uncovers the photos of Barrymore in the play and childhood photos of actresses Blanche Ring and Rose Stahl. In the musical film Singin' in the Rain (1952), Barrymore is held up as an example of a lofty actress when Gene Kelly mocks Debbie Reynolds in a squabble about what makes a serious actor. He repeats the humorous taunt when Reynolds jumps out of a giant cake as a show girl.

== Personal life ==
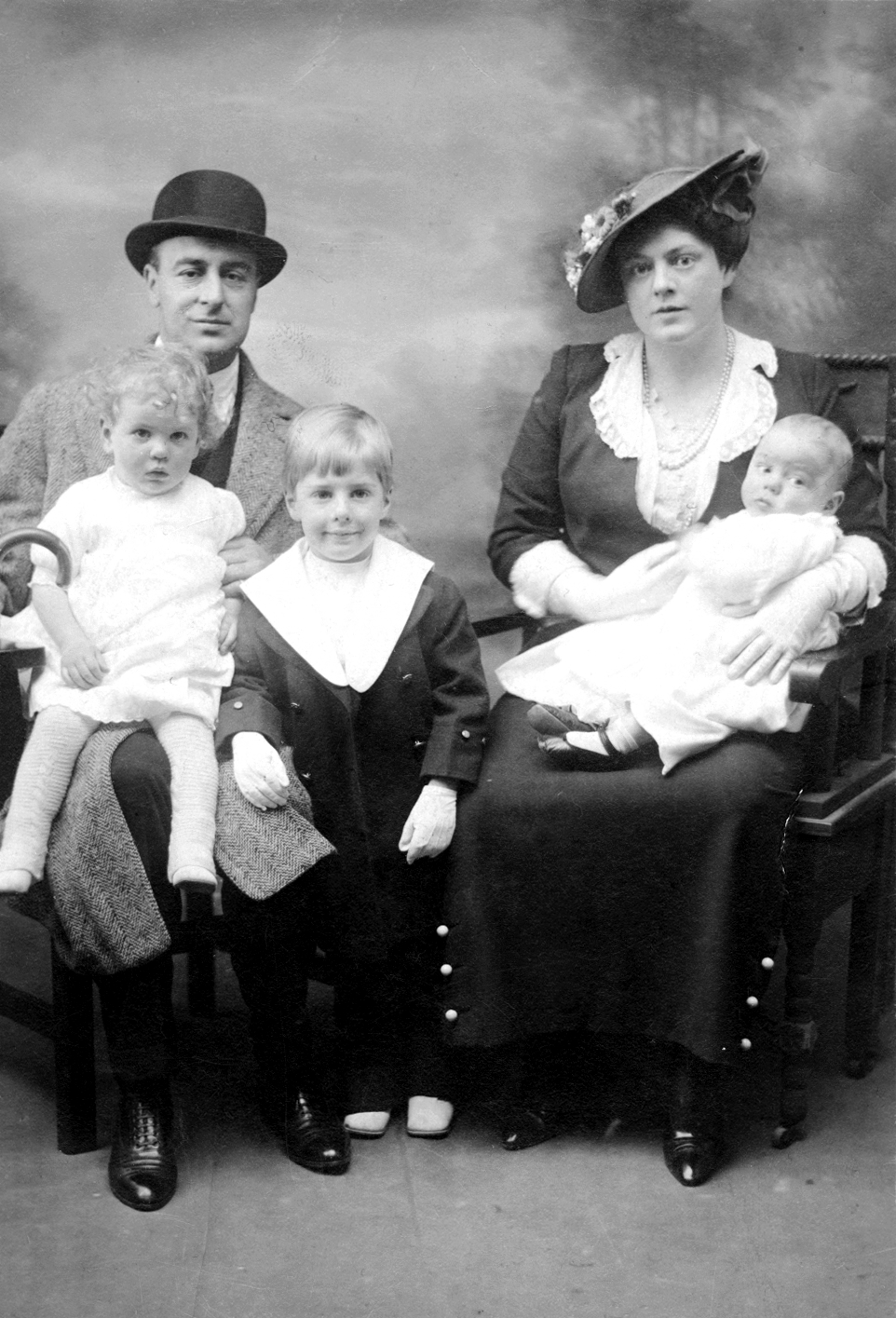
Barrymore with her husband Russell Griswold Colt and their three children, c. 1914.

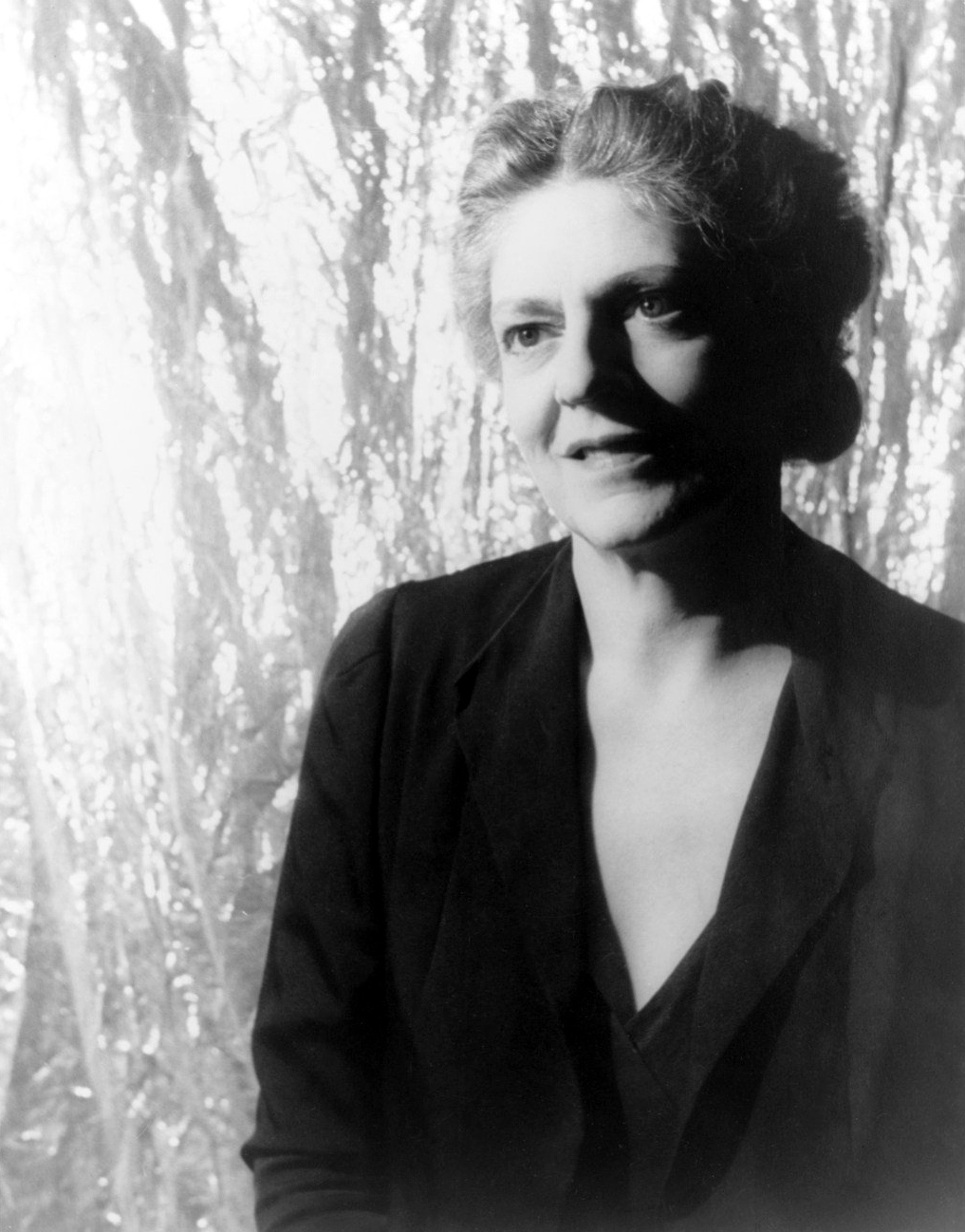
Portrait by Carl Van Vechten, 1937

Winston Churchill was among Barrymore's many new friends in England. Churchill proposed to her in 1900, and while Barrymore mentioned no such proposal in her autobiography, she included a photograph of herself and Churchill on the lawn at Blenheim Palace in 1899. While touring in England at age 19, she was rumored to be engaged to the Duke of Manchester, actor Gerald du Maurier, writer Richard Harding Davis and Churchill. She was engaged to Laurence Irving, son of Sir Henry Irving, but the couple did not marry.

Barrymore married Russell Griswold Colt (1882–1960) on March 14, 1909. The couple had three children: Samuel Colt (1909–1986), actress and singer Ethel Barrymore Colt (1912–1977), and John Drew Colt (1913–1975).

Barrymore campaigned for the reelection of President Herbert Hoover in 1932.

== Death ==
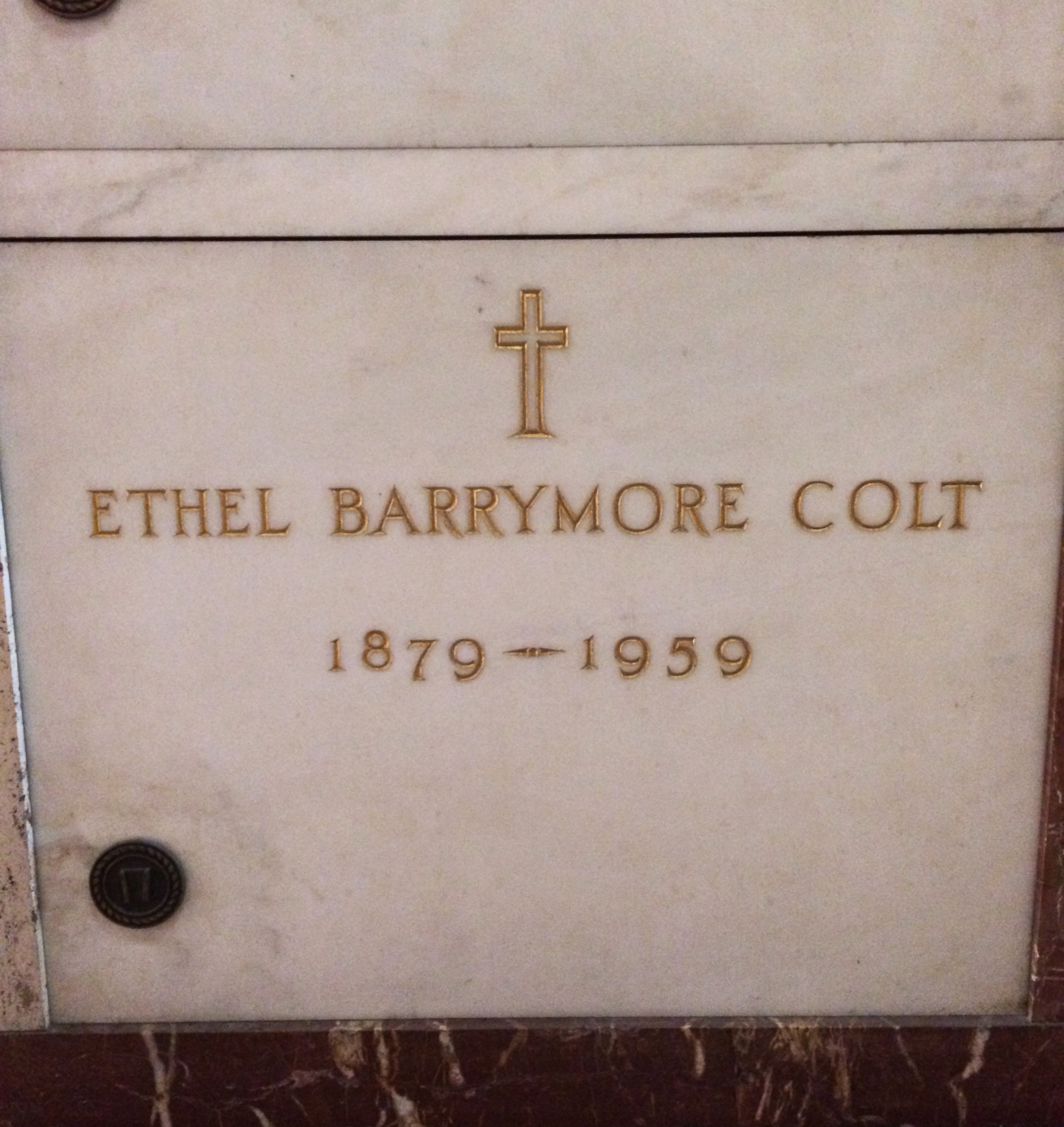
Barrymore's crypt at Calvary Cemetery

Ethel Barrymore died of cardiovascular disease on June 18, 1959, at her home in Hollywood, after having lived for many years with a heart condition. She was less than two months shy of her 80th birthday. She was entombed at Calvary Cemetery. The Ethel Barrymore Theatre in New York City is named for her.

== Honors ==
In 1960, Barrymore was posthumously inducted into the Hollywood Walk of Fame with a motion pictures star for her contributions to the film industry. Her star is located at 7001 Hollywood Boulevard. Barrymore was a member of the American Theater Hall of Fame, along with her brothers, John and Lionel.

A crater on the planet Venus is named for Barrymore.

== See also ==
- List of actors with Academy Award nominations
- List of covers of Time magazine (1920s) – November 10, 1924
