= Rankin family =

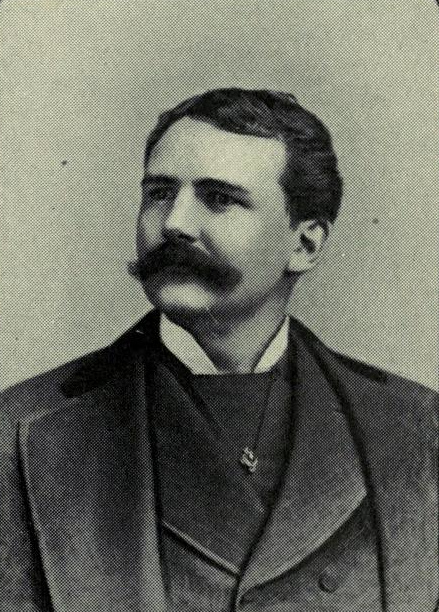
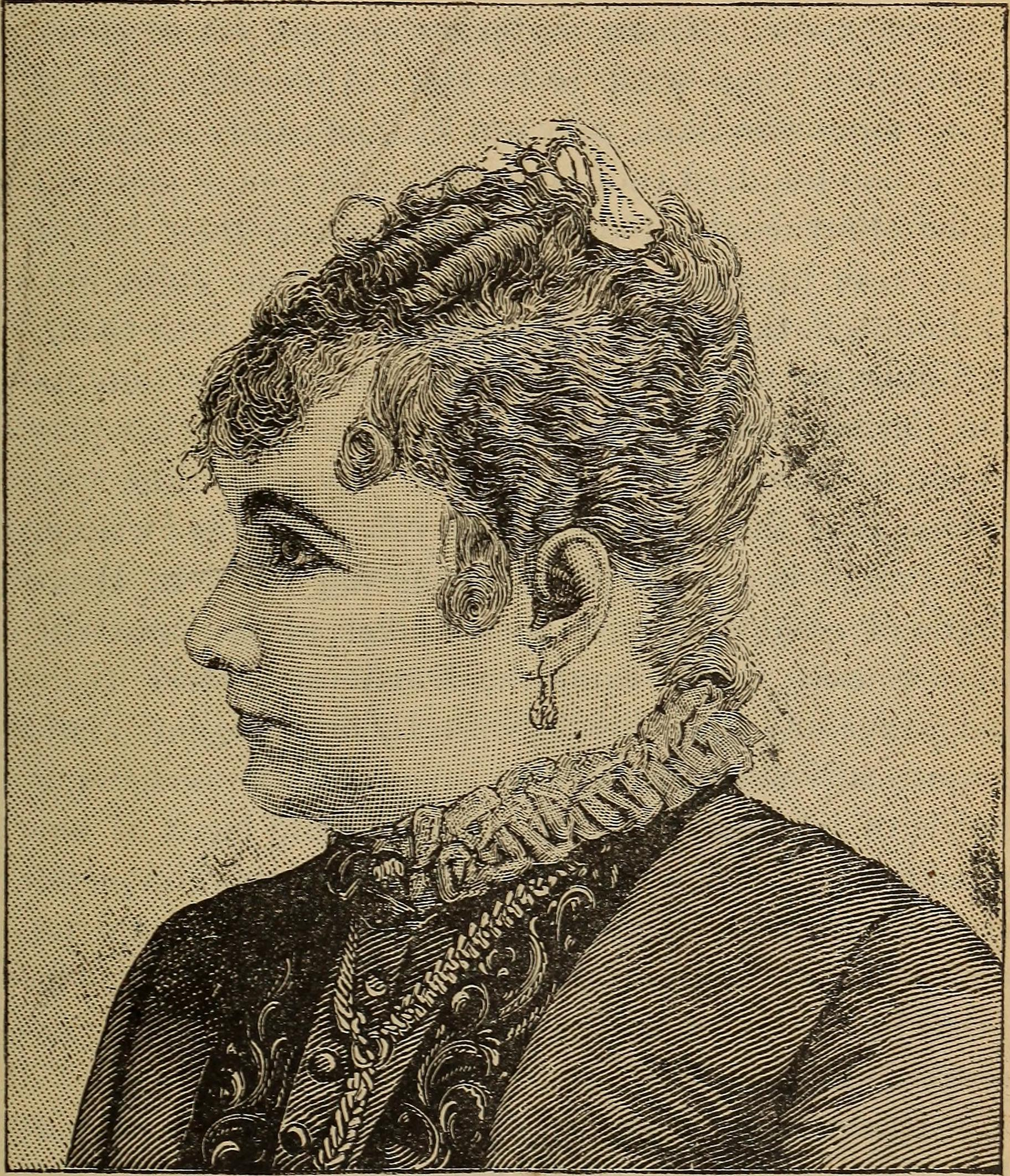
- McKee Rankin Kitty Blanchard
- Current region: United States East Coast
- Origin: Philadelphia, Pennslyvania
- Connected families: Drew family Barrymore family

The Rankin family is an American multi-generational acting family prominent in the 19th and early 20th centuries.

== History ==
Arthur McKee Rankin was the son of Colonel Arthur Rankin, a member of the Canadian Parliament. His mother, Mary McKee, was granddaughter of Thomas McKee and the great-granddaughter of Alexander McKee and Nonhelema Hokolesqua. He had one brother, George Cameron. His paternal grandparents were Irish immigrants.

After a dispute with his father he left home to become an actor. He made his stage debut in Rochester, New York in 1861 using the name George Henley.

In 1869, Rankin married Kitty Blanchard. Blanchard was a successful actress by her own means and the duo would go on to perform in many successful ventures together. Rankin and Blanchard had two children together - Gladys and Phyllis Rankin.

In 1887, Rankin fathered another daughter, Doris, through an extramartial affair with actress Mabel Bert. All daughters would become actresses and two married into the notable Barrymore-Drew acting family.

== Notable members ==
=== First generation ===
Arthur McKee Rankin (1841 - 1914)

- Married Kitty Blanchard (c. 1847 - 1911)
  - Gladys Rankin
  - Phyllis Rankin
- Affair with Mable Bert
  - Doris Marie Rankin

=== Second generation ===
Gladys Rankin (1870 - 1914)

- Married Sidney Drew
  - Sidney Rankin Drew (1891 - 1918)

Phyllis Rankin (1874 - 1934)

- Married Henry Daniel Gibbs (div.)
  - Catherine Davenport (née Gibbs)
  - Arthur Rankin (née Gibbs)
- Married Harry Davenport
  - Dorothy Davenport (step-daughter)
  - Edward Davenport
  - Ethel Ann Davenport

Doris Rankin (1887 - 1947)

- Married Lionel Barrymore (div.)
  - Ethel Barrymore II (1908 - 1910)
  - Mary Barrymore (1916 - 1917)
- Married Malcom Roger Mortimer
  - Pamela Ann Morimer (1925 - 1991)

=== Third generation ===
Arthur Rankin (1895 - 1947)

- Married Marian Mansfield (1905 - 1988)
  - Arthur Rankin Jr. (1924 - 2014)

Dorothy Davenport (1895 - 1977)

- Married Wallace Reid
  - Wallace Reid Jr. (1917 - 1990)
  - Betty Anna Reid (1919 - 1967) (adopted)

=== Fourth generation ===
Arthur Rankin Jr. (1924 - 2014)

- Married Elizabeth Deland
  - Arthur Gardner Rankin III
  - Todd Fraser Rankin (1954 - 2015)
- Married Olga Kalatos

Wallace Reid Jr. (1917 - 1990)

- Married Nora Pauline Teston (div.)
- Married Ruth Dugan

== Legacy ==
The production company Rankin/Bass Animated Entertainment is partially named for the Rankin family, as the co-creator is Arthur Rankin Jr. The company is behind classics such as Rudolph the Red-Nosed Reindeer, Frosty the Snowman, Santa Claus Is Comin' to Town, and the 1977 cartoon special of The Hobbit.
