= Mr. and Mrs. Sidney Drew =

American comedy duo on stage and screen

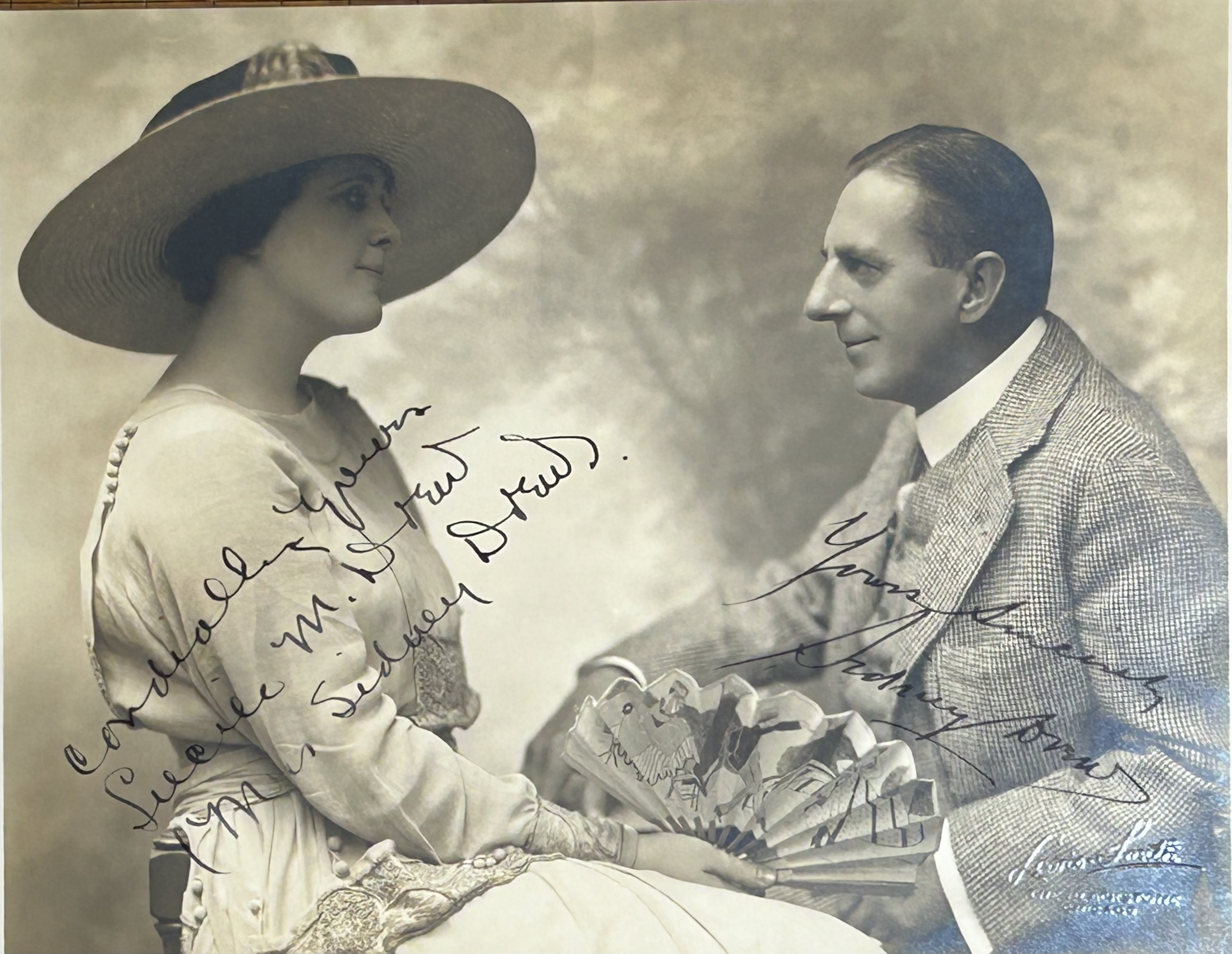
- Sidney Drew and Lucille McVey

Comedy career
- Members: Sidney Drew; Gladys Rankin; Lucille McVey

Mr. & Mrs. Sidney Drew were an American comedy team on stage and screen. The team initially consisted of Sidney Drew (August 28, 1863 – April 9, 1919) and his first wife Gladys Rankin (October 8, 1870 – January 9, 1914). After Gladys died in 1914, Sidney Drew married Lucille McVey (1890–1925), and the two performed as Mr. and Mrs. Sidney Drew.

== Biography ==
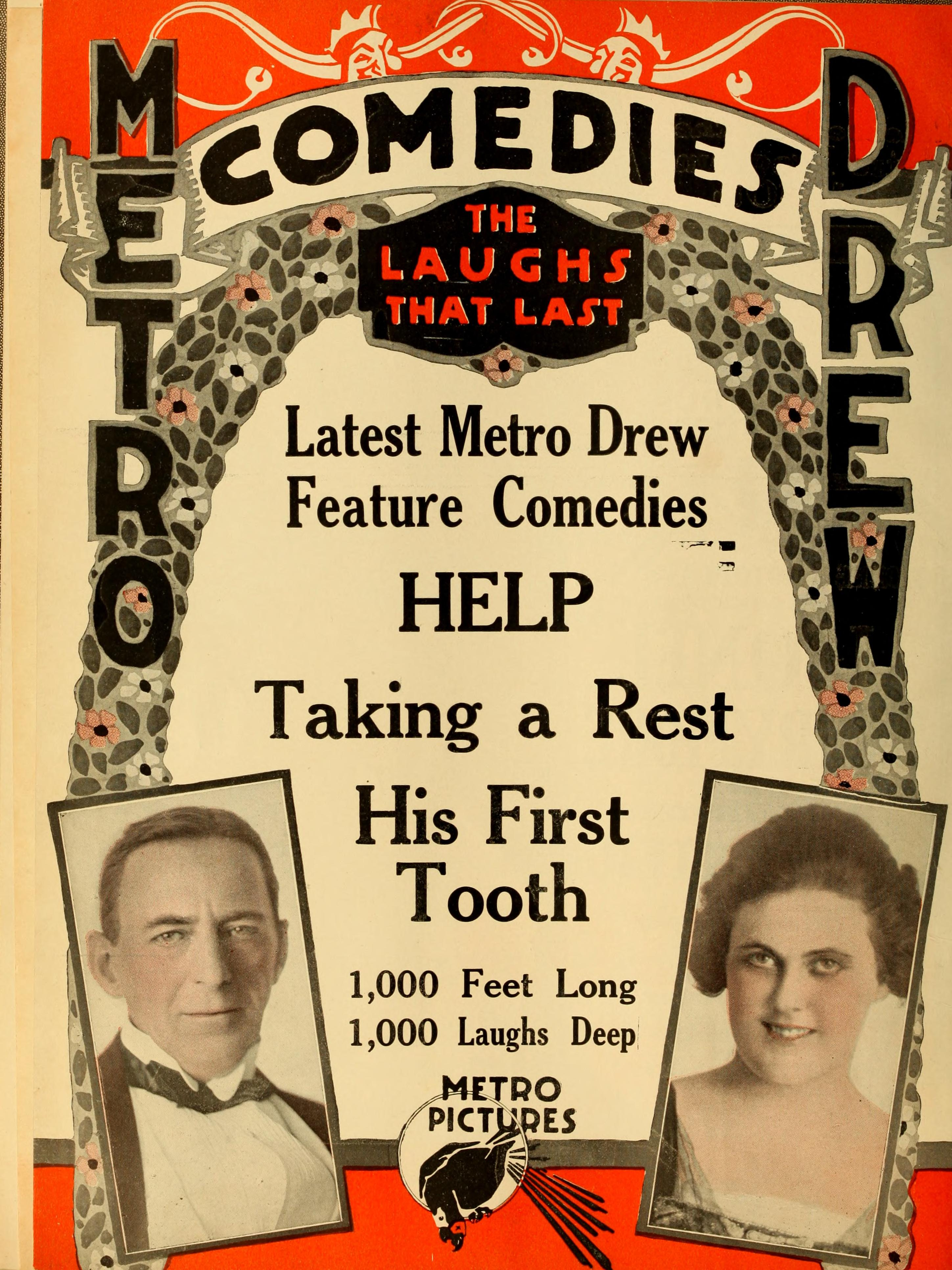
Ad for Help, Taking a Rest, and His First Tooth (1916)

Sidney Drew or Mr. Sidney Drew as he was usually billed, was an uncle of actors Lionel, Ethel and John Barrymore. Drew's origins have been the subject of speculation. His mother Mrs. Louisa Drew said she adopted him not long after the death of her husband John Drew Sr. in 1862. Researchers have speculated that Sidney was Mrs. Drew's biological child from a love affair. It was noticed that she disappeared for some time to the country before returning to Philadelphia with baby Sidney. John Barrymore always said Sidney looked too much like Grandmother Louisa to be anyone else's child.

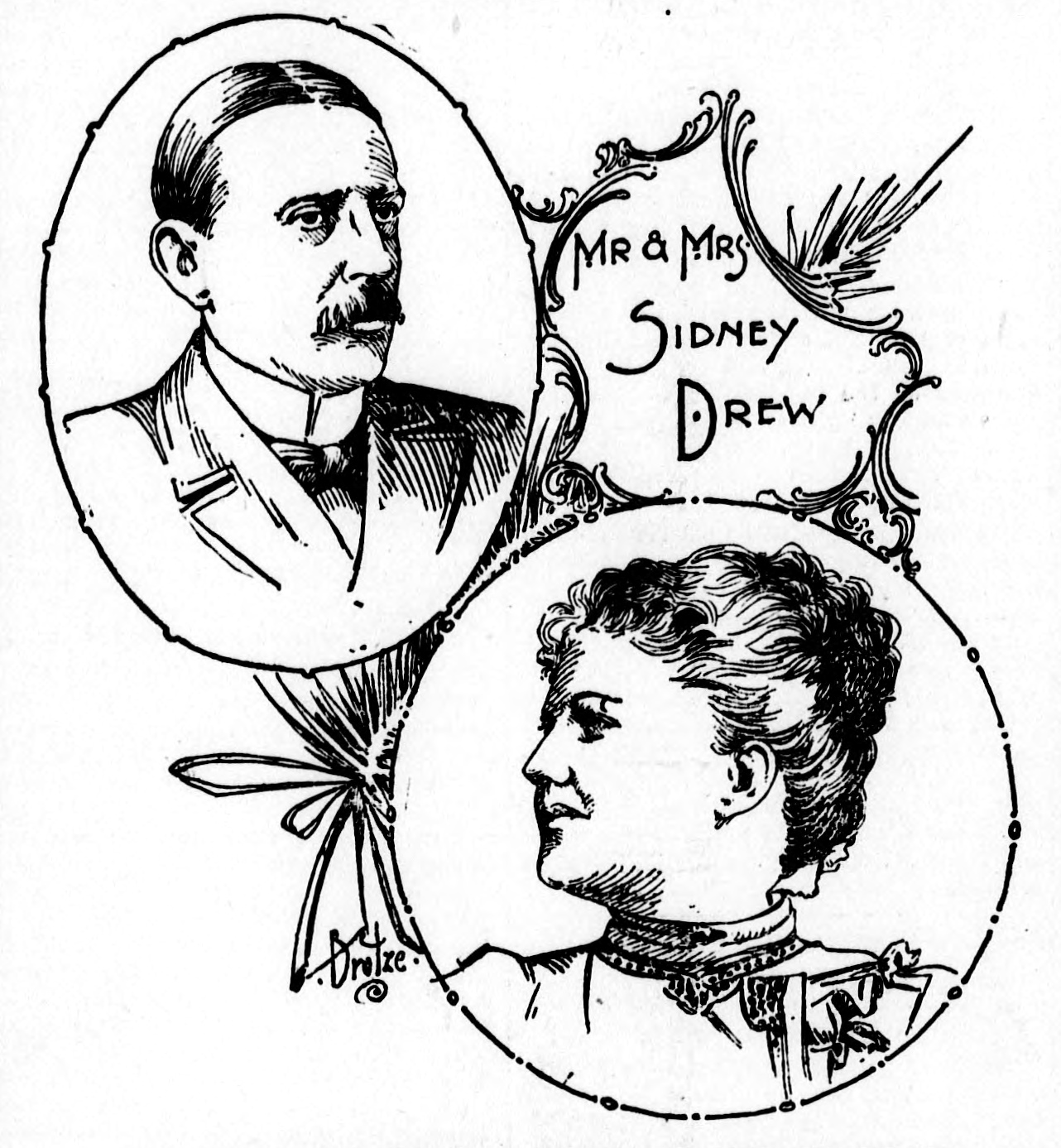
Mr. & Mrs. Sidney Drew (Gladys Rankin), 1898

In his stage career, Drew was a light-hearted leading man along with his wife, Gladys Rankin, the first Mrs. Sidney Drew. She was the daughter of McKee Rankin and Kitty Blanchard, sister of Phyllis Rankin and half-sister of Doris Rankin. The couple would give birth to Sidney Rankin Drew in 1891. In 1896, the pair introduced legitimate drama to the vaudeville stage. They entered films as a team with the old Kalem Company in 1911, but achieved greater success after their switch to Vitagraph in 1913. Gladys Rankin Drew died later that year from undisclosed causes. Drew was briefly paired with Clara Kimball Young, with whom Drew starred in the two-reel melodrama satire Goodness Gracious; or, Movies as they Shouldn't Be (1914) directed by Clara's husband James Young.

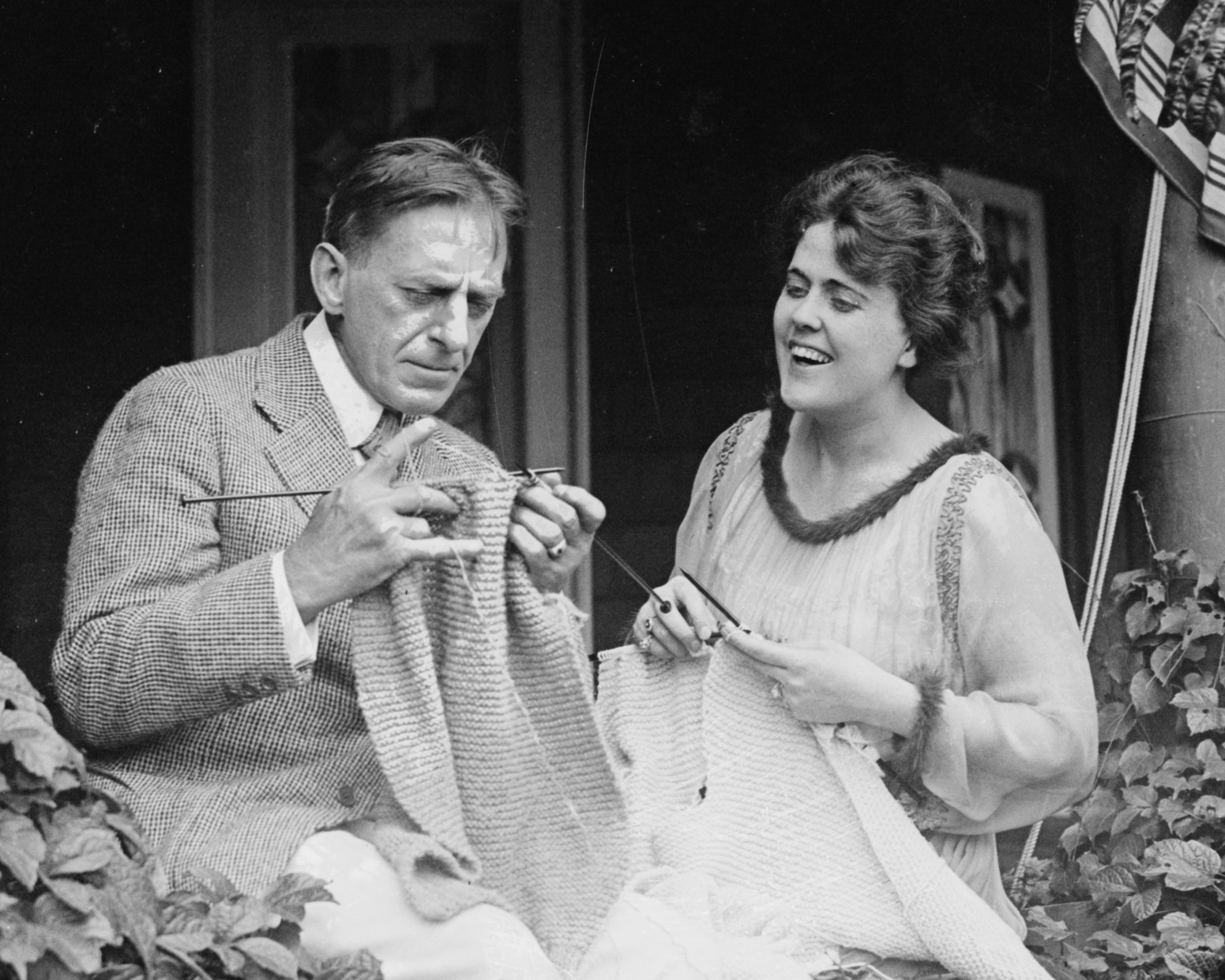
Sidney Drew and Lucille McVey (the second Mrs. Sidney Drew) in 1917

He was remarried to Lucille McVey, born in Sedalia, Missouri, a Vitagraph scriptwriter who briefly went under the name Jane Morrow. Drew added his new wife to his one-reel comedies, acknowledging McVey as both a writer and co-director. As a comedy team, known as Mr. & Mrs. Sidney Drew, the team perfected the situation comedy style that the team of John Bunny and Flora Finch started. Their style of comedy was usually gentle satire on married life, but also poked fun at the world of show business. Drew took sole credit as director for two five-reel features at Vitagraph, the groundbreaking cross-gender comedy A Florida Enchantment (1914), in which Edith Storey played the leading female role, and the drama Playing Dead (1915), the Drews' only attempt at a "serious" film.

In 1916, the popular team was lured to Richard A. Rowland and Louis B. Mayer's newly founded Metro company, where they continued to dominate in the field of marital comedy. During World War I, Drew's son, actor-director S. Rankin Drew, was killed in action. Drew never recovered from the loss. The team left Metro for personal appearances but was signed to V.B.K. Drew died suddenly on April 9, 1919, and was interred in Mount Vernon Cemetery in Philadelphia. Lucille McVey Drew died in 1925 from cancer at the age of 35.

== Awards ==
- Mr. and Mrs. Sidney Drew have a joint star on the Hollywood Walk of Fame.

== Selected filmography ==
- Jerry's Mother-In-Law (1913)
- Beauty Unadorned (1913)
- Too Many Husbands (1914)
- A Florida Enchantment (1914)
- Boobley's Baby (1915)
- Fox Trot Finesse (1915) (Short)
- Diplomatic Henry (1915) (Short)
- Help (1916) (Short)
- Taking a Rest (1916) (Short)
- His Fourth Tooth (1916) (Short)
- Pay Day (1918)
- Romance and Rings (1919) (Short)
- Bunkered (1919) (Short)
- The Stimulating Mrs. Barton (1920)
- Cousin Kate (1921) (Directed by Mrs. Sidney Drew)
