= Phyllis Rankin =

American actress and singer (1874–1934)

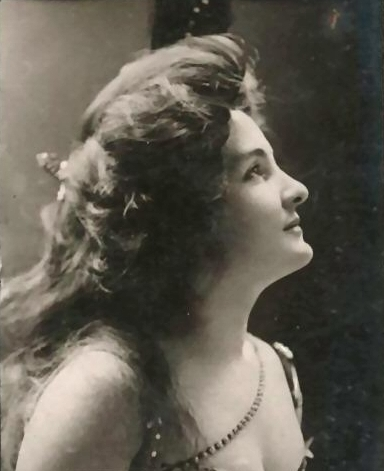
- Born: Phyllis McKee Rankin; August 31, 1874; New York City, U.S.
- Died: November 17, 1934 (aged 60); Canton, Pennsylvania, U.S.
- Occupations: Actress, singer
- Years active: 1884–1920s
- Spouse(s): Charles Henry D. Gibbs (m. 1895–1899) Harry Davenport (m. 1901)
- Children: 4, including Arthur Rankin
- Parents: McKee Rankin (father); Kitty Blanchard (mother)
- Relatives: Gladys Rankin (sister); Doris Rankin (half-sister); Arthur Rankin Jr. (grandson); S. Rankin Drew (nephew)
- Family: Rankin family

Phyllis McKee Rankin (August 31, 1874 – November 17, 1934) was a Broadway actress and singer from the 1880s to the 1920s.

== Early life ==
Phyllis McKee Rankin was the second daughter of stage actors Elizabeth "Kitty" Blanchard and Arthur McKee Rankin, also known as McKee Rankin.

Her older sister, Gladys Rankin, was also an entertainer with her husband Sidney Drew in an act billed Mr. & Mrs. Sidney Drew, and her younger half-sister, Doris Rankin, was a stage and screen actress and one-time wife of actor Lionel Barrymore.

In September 1890, her mother Elizabeth Rankin filed a motion contesting her husband's resistance to providing support for their daughter. A previous suit, in which she filed for separation was being considered by the New York Supreme Court.

Phyllis Rankin was tutored by her father in "old school drama". She made her first stage appearance as a youth of 10 with her parents in Stormbeaten. She eventually left her father's companies and was managed by Charles Frohman.

A house belonging to McKee Rankin at 40 Edgecombe Avenue, near 136th Street, burned in the early morning of April 1, 1891. Rankin and her mother were inside when the fire began in a linen closet. The blaze was contained and put out through the efforts of a "bucket brigade". Damage was estimated at $400 and was covered by insurance.

== Career ==
Rankin was in the supporting cast of Sara, a play performed at the Palmer Theatre, in the summer of 1890. She played the abandoned wife of a French adventurer named Antoine la Rue. She would make her Arch Street Theatre, Philadelphia debut in 1892 in a production of The Rivals, alongside theatre legend Louisa Lane Drew.

Rose Coghlan obtained Rankin to replace Jennie Yeamans in an 1892 production of The Check Book. In April 1893 she appeared in the Arabian Nights on a variety bill at the Standard Theatre and Frohman's comedians were also featured performers.

In 1896, Rankin would marry actor Harry Davenport and the pair would go on to star in multiple projects together. Davenport portrayed a doctor and Rankin, a housekeeper, in Three Wise Fools.

In February 1897, Rankin was part of a bill at the Olympia Music Hall that included Auguste van Biene. The same month she appeared at Proctor's Twenty-Third Street Theatre, In May, she entertained at the St. Nicholas Music Hall. She sang at Koster & Bial's Music Hall, in June. In July, Rankin performed with Lizzie Evans and George Thatcher at B.F. Keiths New Union Square Theatre, During her engagement at the Keith establishment, she did impersonations of Anna Held.

At the Casino Theatre, Rankin played Fifi Fricot in The Belle of New York, which had a one-week booking in December 1897. By August 1898, she was receiving offers from English managers of comic opera. The Belle of New York was staged at the Shaftesbury Theatre on the West End with Davenport in the company. She would spend three years starring in the play in London. Her most popular duet becoming "When We Are Married How Happy We'll Be" became a staple song of hers that she would often perform.

In 1908, Rankin appeared in a production of the comic opera The Naked Truth, produced by her husband and under the direction of her brother-in-law Sidney Drew. The production traveled between New York, Boston, and Philadelphia.

In 1923, she and Davenport toured an original production of John Golden's comedy Thank-U. Other productions in which she acted were The Rounders, It Happened in Nordland, and Fascinating Flora.

== Personal life and death ==
In 1894, Rankin had met actor Charles Henry D. Gibbs, stage manager of the Drew Comedy Company. The two would elope that year in secret, before officiating the wedding in 1895. Rankin's family was extremely disapproving of the match and Sidney Drew was reportly irrate at the news. The couple would have two children Catherine and Arthur. In June 1899, Rankin returned from a tour in London to file for divorce on the grounds of infidelity and requested custody of the children. She was granted both.

Rankin met actor Harry Davenport in 1897 during the run of The Belle of New York and would eventually begin a relationship. They married in May 1901. Davenport had one daughter from a previous marriage, Dorothy Davenport, and would legally adopt Arthur and Catherine. The couple had two children together - Edward 'Ned,' and Ann. Their grandson was producer and director Arthur Rankin Jr.

Rankin died in Canton, Pennsylvania on November 17, 1934 at the age of 60.

== Theatre ==
Year	Title	Role	Theatre	Ref.
1890	Sara		Palmer Theatre, Broadway	
1892	The Rivals	Lydia Languish	Arch Street Theatre, Philadelphia	
1892	The Check Book			
1897	The Belle of New York	Fifi Fricot	Casino Theatre, Broadway	
1898 - 1901	The Belle of New York	Fifi Fricot	Shaftesbury Theatre, West End	
1908	The Naked Truth	Stella	Tour	
1911	The Commuters		Tour	
1923	Thank-U		Tour	
