= McKee Rankin =

Canadian actor and theatrical manager

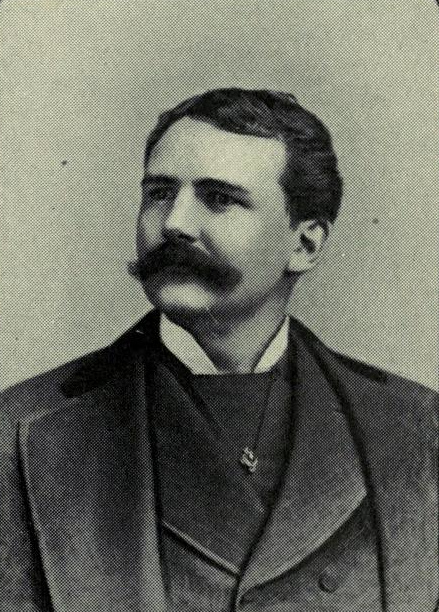
- circa 1870s
- Born: Arthur McKee Rankin; February 6, 1841; Sandwich, Ontario Canada
- Died: April 17, 1914 (aged 73); San Francisco, California
- Resting place: Kensico Cemetery, Valhalla, New York (Westchester County)
- Other name: George Henley
- Occupations: actor, manager
- Years active: 1861–1911
- Spouse: Kitty Blanchard (m. 1869; died 1911)
- Children: Gladys Rankin; Phyllis Rankin; Doris Rankin
- Father: Arthur Rankin
- Relatives: Alexander McKee (2nd Great-Grandfather); Nonhelema (2nd Great-Grandmother); Thomas McKee (Great-Grandfather)

Arthur McKee Rankin (February 6, 1841 – April 17, 1914) was a Canadian born American stage actor, playwright, and manager.

== Life ==
Arthur McKee Rankin was born February 6, 1841 in Sandwich, Ontario, Canada. He was the son of Colonel Arthur Rankin, a member of the Canadian Parliament. His mother, Mary McKee, was granddaughter of Thomas McKee and the great-granddaughter of Alexander McKee and Nonhelema. He had one brother, George Cameron. His paternal grandparents were Irish immigrants.

After a dispute with his father he left home to become an actor. He made his stage debut in Rochester, New York in 1861 using the name George Henley.

In 1863 he was seen at Wood's Theatre in Cincinnati in the play The Stranger as The Count. During this time he was engaged by Louisa Lane Drew at her Arch Street Theatre in Philadelphia. Rankin served for three months as a Lieutenant in his father’s regiment, the 1st Michigan Lancers, during the American Civil War.

In 1866 he appeared at the Olympic Theatre in London run by Mrs. John Wood. Rankin increasingly became popular in the melodramas of the period and in 1867 was in a play called The Hunchback. In 1870 he appeared with Lydia Thompson in Mosquito and was a leading man from 1873 to 1875 at the famous Union Square Theatre. Having married Elizabeth Blanchard better known as Kitty they acted together in the 1870s appearing in the smash hit play The Two Orphans in 1874. He collaborated with playwright Frederick G. Maeder on several plays, among them The Runaway Wife and The Canuck.

In 1898, Rankin became the manager of American actress Nance O'Neill. The two would tour most English-speaking countries together. Rankin would be instrumental in making her a star in Australia and in overseeing her London debut at the Adelphi Theatre. He was also responsible for giving her the stage name Nance O'Neill.

== Personal life ==
Rankin married actress Kitty Blanchard in 1869 and had two daughters, Gladys and Phyllis. Through an extra marital affair with Mabel Bert, he fathered Doris Rankin in 1887.

While it is not clear whether Rankin and Blanchard were divorced or separated, in October 1891 Blanchard sued Rankin for support of herself and then 16-year-old Phyllis. Two months later, in January 1892, Rankin sued his wife for divorce.

== Death and decendancy ==
Rankin's wife, Kitty Blanchard, was found dead in hotel in 1911, believed to be an accidental drowning. Rankin died in San Francisco on April 17, 1914 at the age of 73.

His daughters' various marriages aligned him with other theatrical families. Gladys married Sidney Drew, of the Drew acting family. Phyllis was later the wife of Harry Davenport whose father and sister were E. L. Davenport and the famous Fanny Davenport. Doris married Lionel Barrymore, of the Barrymore acting family, in 1904. Both Sidney Drew and Lionel Barrymore descended from the famous Louisa Lane Drew of Philadelphia.

Rankin's great-grandson was Arthur Rankin Jr. whose partnership with Jules Bass brought several Christmas holiday television classics from the Rankin-Bass company.
