= Gladys Rankin =

American playwright and actress (1870–1914)

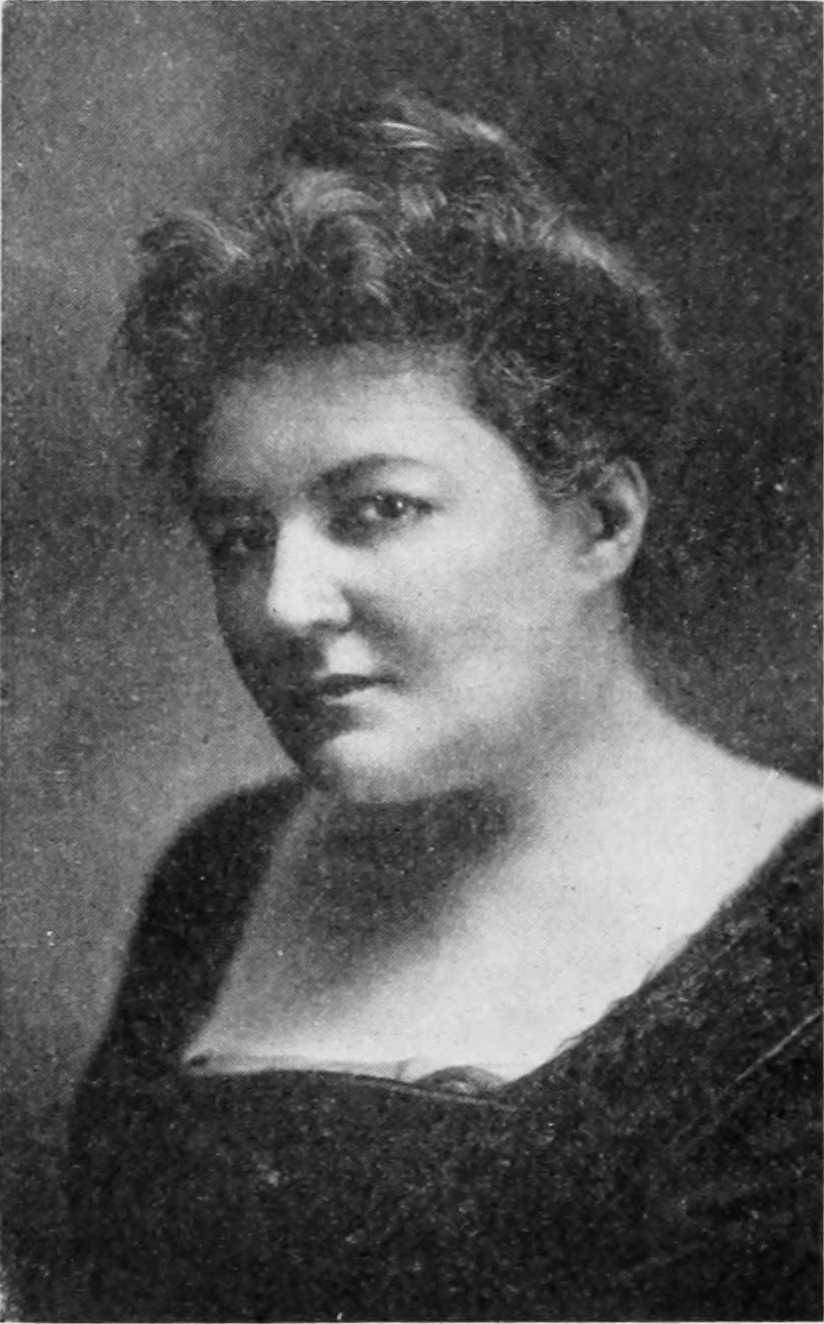
- Born: October 8, 1870; New York City, New York
- Died: January 9, 1914 (aged 43); New York City, New York
- Other names: Mrs. Sidney Drew; George Cameron
- Known for: Mr. and Mrs. Sidney Drew
- Spouse: Sidney Drew (m. 1889)
- Children: Sidney Rankin Drew
- Parents: McKee Rankin (father); Kitty Blanchard (mother)
- Relatives: Phyllis Rankin (sister); Doris Rankin (half-sister)

Gladys Rankin (October 8, 1870 - January 9, 1914) was an American actress, comedian, and playwright. She was best known for being the first "Mrs. Sidney Drew" in the comedy duo Mr. and Mrs. Sidney Drew. She was wrote under the name George Cameron.

== Early life ==
Gladys Rankin was born October 8, 1870 in New York City, New York to stage actors McKee Rankin and Kitty Blachard. She had two sisters, Phyllis and Doris Rankin, both actors.

== Career ==
In her stage career, Rankin was a light-hearted leading man along with his wife, Gladys Rankin, the first "Mrs. Sidney Drew". By 1893, the pair had established Mr. and Mrs. Sidney Drew's Comedy Company. Drew's mother and acclaimed actress Louisa Lane Drew would tour with the company. Other cast members included Charles Verner, Owen Fancett, and Drew's nephew Lionel Barrymore. In 1896, the pair introduced legitimate drama to the vaudeville stage.

== Personal life ==
Rankin married actor Sidney Drew, of the prominent Drew acting family, on July 22, 1889 at St. Francis Xavier Church in Phildadelphia. The couple had one son, actor and director Sidney Rankin Drew in 1891. Rankin Drew was killed-in-action on May 19, 1918 when his plane was shot down over France during World War I.

Rankin and Drew separated in 1894 after rumors of Drew's infidelity with different actresses came out and she filed for divorce. They would eventually reconcile and stayed married until her death.

In 1913, Rankin was diagnosised with cancer and she died on January 9, 1914 at the Marlborough Hotel.

=== Legacy ===
Mr. and Mrs. Sidney Drew have a joint star on the Hollywood Walk of Fame.

In 1916, Rankin's son, Sidney Rankin Drew, directed Thou Art the Man. It was the last script written by Rankin on her deathbed. He regarded the film as a masterpiece and a tribute to his mother.

== Theatre ==
Year	Title	Role	Notes	Ref.
1888	A Legal Wreck			
1890	The Burglar			
1891	That Girl from Mexico			
1893	The Road to Ruin	Sophia Fondlove		
1897	Rosemary			
