= Speed (1925 film) =

1925 film

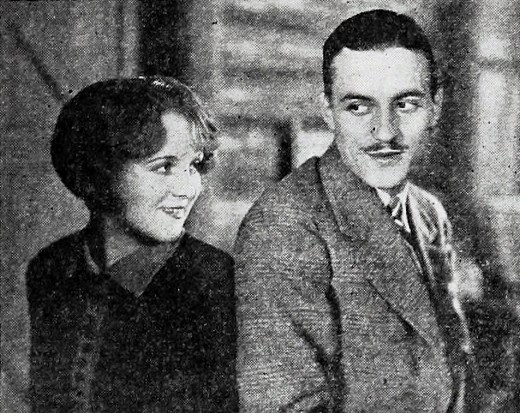
- Still from a magazine
- Directed by: Edward LeSaint
- Written by: Lois Zellner
- Based on: Speed; 1924 story in Saturday Evening Post by Grace Sartwell Mason
- Produced by: Ben Verschleiser
- Starring: Betty Blythe; Pauline Garon; Arthur Rankin
- Cinematography: King D. Gray; Orin Jackson
- Production company: Banner Productions
- Distributed by: Henry Ginsberg Distributing Company; UFA (Germany)
- Release date: April 26, 1925
- Running time: 60 minutes
- Country: United States
- Language: Silent (English intertitles)

Speed is a 1925 American silent comedy drama film directed by Edward LeSaint and starring Betty Blythe, Pauline Garon, and Arthur Rankin.

== Plot ==
As described in a film magazine review, because they are called "old fashioned" by their children, Mr. and Mrs. Whipple buy a car, plan a trip out West, and decide to jazz things up some themselves. Their daughter Wiletta accompanies them on the trip, leaving her sheik behind. Out West she meets Nat, who helps in preventing the two parents from being swindled in a deal for a gold mine. There follows a kidnapping, a holdup, and a chase down a mountainside to save Wiletta. At the end, all of them determine to give up modern jazz methods.

== Cast ==
- Betty Blythe as Mary Whipple
- Pauline Garon as Wiletta Whipple
- William V. Mong as Sam Whipple
- Arthur Rankin as Dick Whipple
- Alfred Allen as Nat Armstrong
- Robert Ellis as Nat Armstrong Jr.
- Eddie Phillips as Jack Cartwright
- Fred Becker as Señor Querino
- Stella De Lanti as Señora Querino

== Preservation ==
A print of Speed is held in the Gosfilmofond film archive in Moscow, Russia.

== Bibliography ==
- Munden, Kenneth White. The American Film Institute Catalog of Motion Pictures Produced in the United States, Part 1. University of California Press, 1997.
