= The Devil's Garden (film) =

1920 film by Kenneth Webb

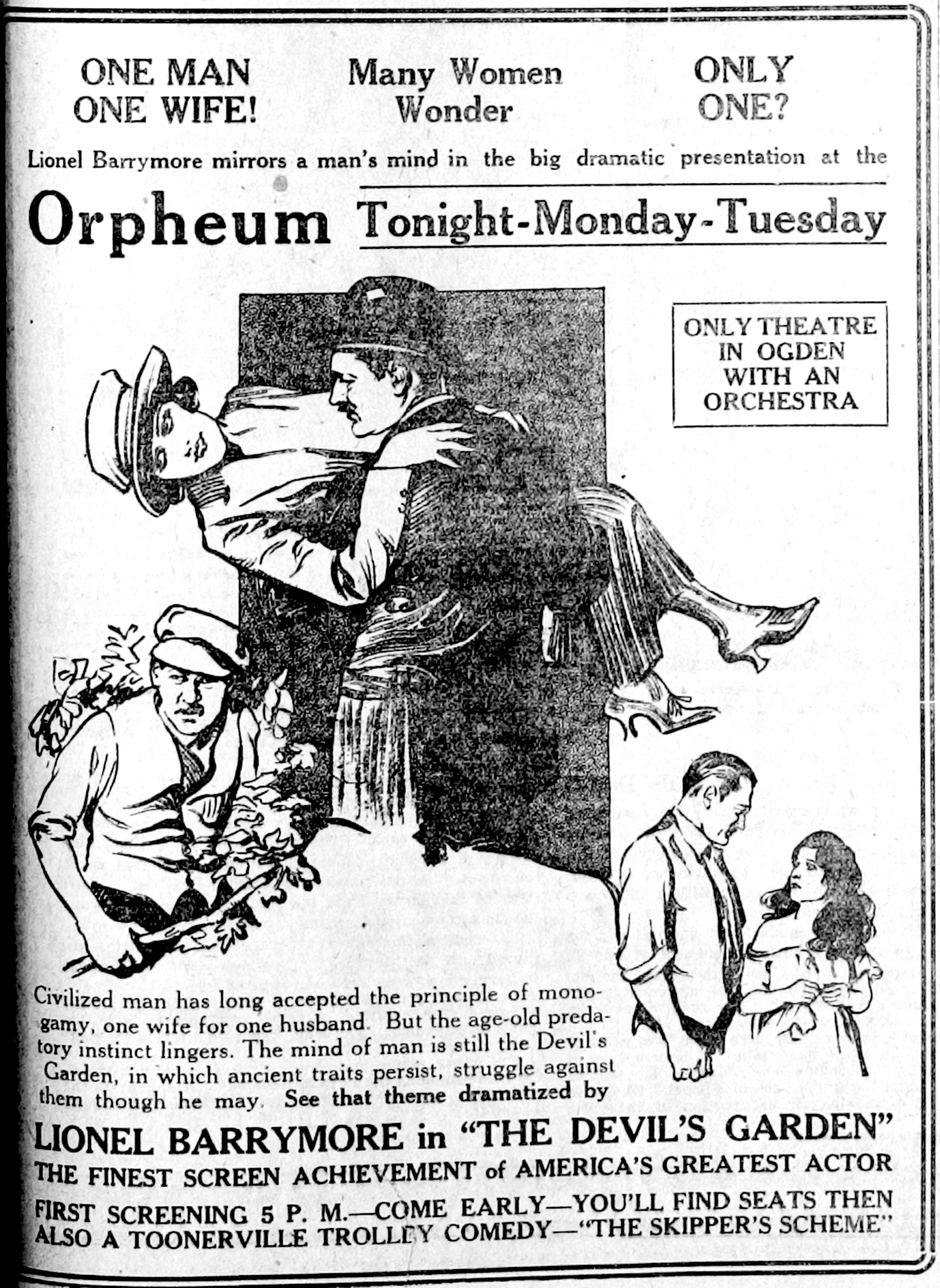
- Newspaper advertisement
- Directed by: Kenneth Webb
- Written by: Whitman Bennett (adaptation); Kenneth Webb (adaptation); Violet Clark (scenario)
- Based on: The Devil's Garden by William Babington Maxwell
- Produced by: Whitman Bennett Productions
- Starring: Lionel Barrymore; May McAvoy
- Cinematography: Tom L. Griffith; Harry Stradling
- Distributed by: First National Exhibitor's Circuit (*later First National Pictures)
- Release date: November 22, 1920
- Running time: 6 reels
- Country: United States
- Language: Silent (English intertitles)

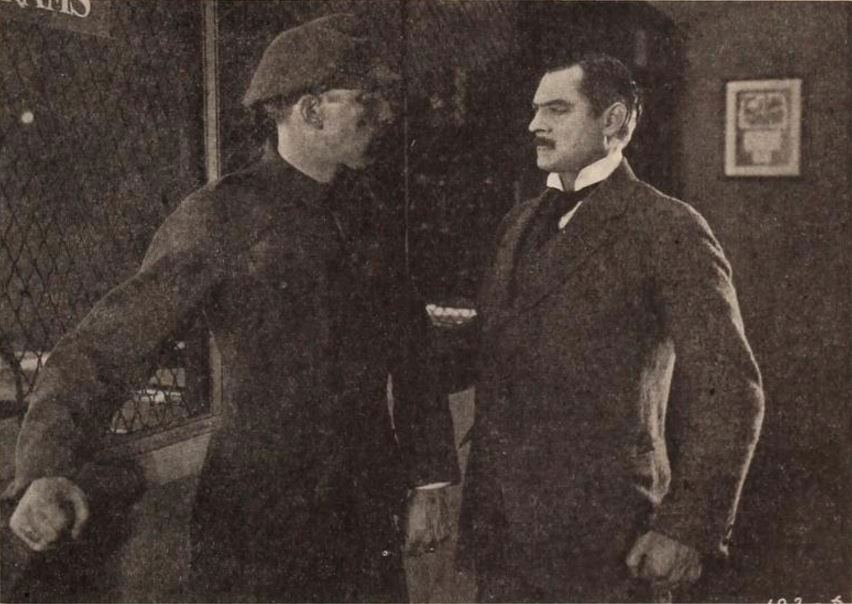
Unidentified actor and Lionel Barrymore

The Devil's Garden is a lost 1920 American silent drama film produced by Whitman Bennett, directed by Kenneth Webb, and released through First National Exhibitor's Circuit, which was later known as First National Pictures. The film starred Lionel Barrymore, May McAvoy, and Barrymore's first wife Doris Rankin. It is based on the 1913 novel, The Devil's Garden by William Babington Maxwell, and was the first film for Whitman Bennett Productions.

== Cast ==
- Lionel Barrymore as William Dale
- Doris Rankin as Mavis Dale
- May McAvoy as Norah
- H. Cooper Cliffe as Lors Barradine
