= Doris Rankin =

American actress (1888–1946)

Doris Marie Rankin
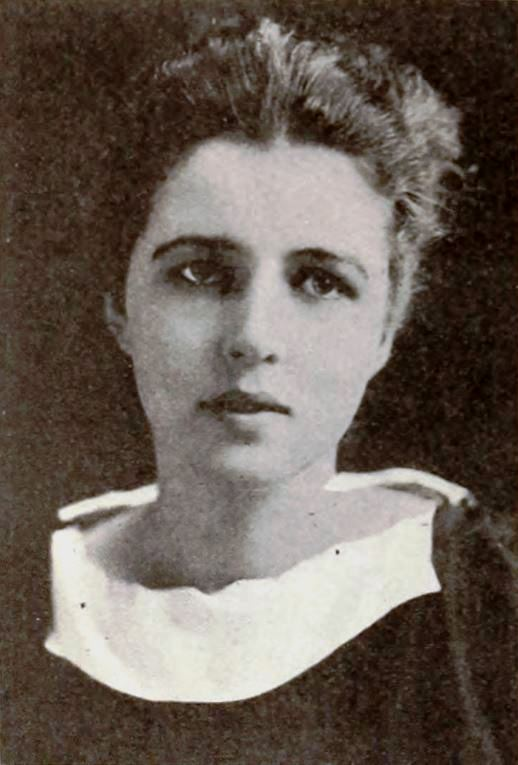
- Rankin in 1920
- Born: Doris Marie Rankin; August 24, 1887; New York City, U.S.
- Died: March 18, 1947 (aged 59); Washington, D.C., U.S.
- Occupations: Stage and film actress
- Spouses: Lionel Barrymore (m. 1904; div. 1922) Malcolm Mortimer (m. 1923)
- Children: 4
- Parent(s): McKee Rankin; Mabel Bert
- Relatives: Phyllis Rankin (half-sister); Gladys Rankin (half-sister)

Doris Marie Rankin (August 24, 1887 – March 18, 1947) was an American stage and film actress.

== Biography ==
Born in New York City, Rankin was the daughter of actor McKee Rankin and Mabel Bert. She was married to actor Lionel Barrymore from 1904 to 1922. Doris had two older half-sisters from her father's marriage to Kitty Blanchard: Gladys Rankin who was married to Lionel's uncle Sidney Drew and Phyllis Rankin who was married to Harry Davenport of the Davenport theatrical family.

Rankin began her career with several roles with her father's company, her best-remembered part being as an Italian white slave in The White Slaver. Prior to this, she performed in a number of sketches with her father and Barrymore. Rankin and Barrymore married in 1904 when he was 26 and she was 16. Both of them retired from the theater in 1906. The couple lived for an extended period in Paris, France, returning to the United States around 1910. Barrymore studied music and painting while he was there. They had two daughters, Ethel and Mary, and both girls died in infancy. Barrymore was deeply affected by the loss and never got over it.

Rankin's film debut came as Mrs. Shanks in the film The Copperhead (1920) with her husband which had been a great success for them as a play on the Broadway stage. She followed this role with performances in The Devil's Garden (1920), The Great Adventure (1921), Jim the Penman (1921), and Lena Rivers (1925). She continued in motion pictures from silent movies into the era of sound. Her last credited role was in Society Smugglers (1939).

Rankin was given a divorce from Barrymore in December 1922. Barrymore married Irene Fenwick in Rome, Italy, the following June. Rankin married British author Roger Malcolm Mortimer in 1923 in Frederick, Maryland, and they had two children. The couple lived in Santa Monica allowing Rankin to be near film studios.

In 1931, Rankin was operated on for a thyroid ailment at the Park East Hospital in New York City.

Doris Rankin died in Washington, D.C., in 1947. She is buried in Suitland, Maryland, at Cedar Hill Cemetery under her married name Doris Mortimer.

== Filmography ==
- The Copperhead (1920)
- The Devil's Garden (1920)
- The Great Adventure (1921)
- Jim the Penman (1921)
- Lena Rivers (1925)
- Love at First Sight (1929)
- Her Unborn Child (1930)
- Night Angel (1931)
- Come Closer, Folks (1936) uncredited
- The Great Gambini (1937) uncredited
- Hoosier Schoolboy (1937)
- Fit for a King (1937) uncredited
- Boy of the Streets (1937) uncredited
- Saleslady (1938)
- You Can't Take It with You (1938) uncredited
- Society Smugglers (1939)
- Zenobia (1939) uncredited
