= Pay Day (1918 film) =

1918 silent film directed by Sidney Drew & Lucile McVey

- Directed by: Sidney Drew; Lucile McVey
- Written by: Sidney Drew (scenario); Mrs. Sidney Drew (scenario); Tom Bret
- Produced by: Maxwell Karger
- Starring: Sidney Drew; Lucile McVey; Florence Short
- Cinematography: Arthur Martinelli
- Production company: Screen Classics
- Distributed by: Metro Pictures
- Release date: May 27, 1918 (US)
- Running time: 5 reels
- Country: United States
- Language: English

Pay Day is a 1918 American silent comedy-drama film. Written and directed by the husband and wife team of Sidney Drew and Lucile McVey (credited as Mrs. Sidney Drew), the film stars Sidney Drew, Lucile McVey, and Florence Short. It was released on May 27, 1918.

== Cast list ==
- Sidney Drew as Kirke Brentwood
- Lucile McVey as Doris Fenton (credited as Mrs. Sidney Drew)
- Florence Short as Vampire
- Emily Lorraine as Mrs. Fenton
- Charles Riegel as Dr. Grayson
- Linda Farley as Isabel, Mrs. Brentwood I
- Dan Baker as Watkins
- Richard Rowland as himself (credited as Richard A. Rowland)
- Joseph W. Engel as himself (credited as Joseph Engel)
- Mrs. Samuel Zucker as Ruth, Mrs. Brentwood II
