= Fox Trot Finesse =

- Directed by: Sidney Drew
- Written by: Maurice Morris; M. W. Pool (uncredited)
- Produced by: Sidney Drew
- Starring: Sidney Drew, mrs Drew-McVey
- Production company: The Vitagraph Company of America
- Distributed by: General Film Company
- Release date: October 1, 1915
- Running time: 13 minutes
- Country: United States
- Language: Silent...(English intertitles)

Fox Trot Finesse

Fox Trot Finesse is a 1915 short silent film directed by and starring Sidney Drew. It was produced by the Vitagraph Company of America and distributed by the General Film Company.

== Cast ==
- Sidney Drew - Ferdie Crosby
- Mrs. Sidney Drew - Ferdie's Wife - Eva
- Ethel Lee - Ferdie's Mother-in-Law - Mrs. U. Newit
