= Beauty Unadorned =

- Directed by: Sidney Drew; L. Rogers Lytton; James Young
- Written by: Sidney Drew
- Produced by: Vitagraph Company of America
- Starring: Sidney Drew; Clara Kimball Young
- Distributed by: General Film Company
- Release date: December 6, 1913
- Running time: 2 reels
- Country: USA
- Language: Silent

Beauty Unadorned is a 1913 silent short film directed by Sidney Drew, L. Rogers Lytton and James Young. It starred Drew and Clara Kimball Young who was the wife of Young. It was produced by the Vitagraph Company of America. It survives, incomplete, in the Library of Congress collection.

== Cast ==
- Sidney Drew - Commodore Blunt
- Clara Kimball Young - Helen Preston
- James Young - Henry Blunt, the Commodore's Son
- Ethel Lloyd - Irene Pearl Vardin
- Templar Saxe - Viscount de Gagaine
- L. Rogers Lytton - Undetermined
- George Stevens - Matthews
- William Shea - Captain Smith
- Alberta Gallatin - Mrs. Preston
