= Jerry's Mother-In-Law =

- Directed by: James Young
- Produced by: Vitagraph Company of America
- Starring: Sidney Drew; Clara Kimball Young
- Distributed by: General Film Company
- Release date: November 15, 1913
- Running time: 2 reels
- Country: USA
- Languages: Silent, English titles

Jerry's Mother-In-Law is a 1913 silent short comedy film directed by James Young and starring Sidney Drew and Clara Kimball Young. It was produced by the Vitagraph Company of America and released through the General Film Company.

== Plot ==
When Mr. and Mrs. Jerry Brown's mother-in-law arrives she proves to be an unwelcome visitor. She upsets all the peacefulness of the new household. Jerry sneaks off to the French Students' Masque Ball, and while on his way goes into a saloon where two criminal-looking individuals sell him a suit of armor. Rigged up in the armor, Mr. Brown proceeds to the ball. All that night he spends his time rioting with the merry masqueraders and is lionized by the ladies. The next morning he returns home in a cab, and while trying to walk up the front steps, falls down in a deep sleep. The mysterious armored individual is seen from the window by his wife and mother-in-law, who are told by a passing newspaper boy that the armor was stolen from the museum. Mother-in-law calls up the museum and gets the director, who comes on the run with his assistants, and takes the armor, Jerry concealed within it, to its appointed pedestal at the museum. Mrs. Jerry Brown and mother-in-law go to the museum the next day to see the armor and are scared out of their wits when they see smoke curling up from the iron hand-piece. The smoke is coming from a cigarette which Jerry has found left by a visitor. They scream. Jerry jumps from his pedestal and runs from the museum. He is followed by a mob. He seeks refuge at his club, where he consoles himself with the aid of many drinks. Taking a uniform from the bellboy he goes home and is met there by his mother-in-law who was about to leave, but who now decides to stay on indefinitely. She places Jerry under the shower bath and ducks him in the tub. Getting dressed he goes to a hypnotist show and buys a book on hypnotism. Returning home he frightens mother-in-law out of the house trying to hypnotize her. She calls the police. Jerry enlists their aid. Together they scare mother-in-law so badly that she runs away and never returns. That evening Jerry and his pretty young wife celebrate the unwelcome visitor's departure with a large feast.

== Cast ==
- Sidney Drew – Jerry Brown
- Clara Kimball Young – Jerry's Wife
- Kate Price – Jerry's Mother-In-Law
- L. Rogers Lytton – The Hypnotist
- James Young
