= Sidney Drew =

American comedian and filmmaker (1863–1919)

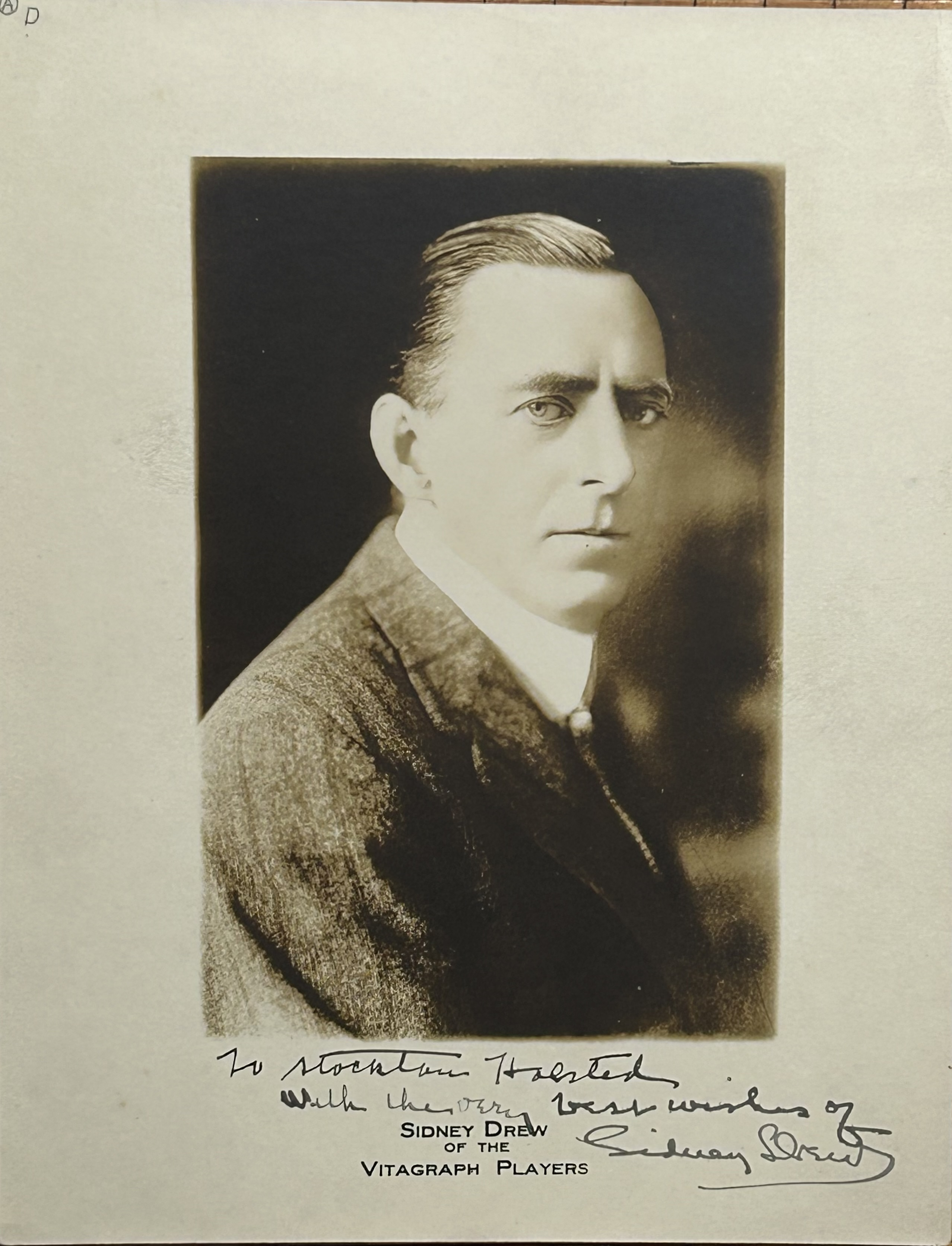
- Born: August 28, 1863; New York, New York
- Died: April 9, 1919 (aged 55); Detroit, Michigan
- Education: University of Pennsylvania
- Known for: Mr. & Mrs. Sidney Drew
- Spouses: Gladys Rankin (m. 1889; died 1914) Lucille McVey (m. 1914)
- Children: Sidney Rankin Drew
- Mother: Louisa Lane Drew
- Relatives: Louisa Drew (sister); John Drew Jr. (brother); Georgiana Drew (sister)
- Family: Drew family

Sidney Drew (August 28, 1863 - April 9, 1919) was an American comedian. He was a part of the comedy duo Mr. & Mrs. Sidney Drew with his wives. Drew was a member of the multi-generational Drew acting family. While his siblings stuck to traditional theatre, Drew is considered a pioneer of vaudeville. He gained significant popularity when he turned to making films.

== Early life ==
Drew was born August 28, 1863 in New York City. Drew's origins have been the subject of speculation. His mother, Louisa Lane Drew, claimed she adopted him not long after the death of her husband John Drew Sr. in 1862. Researchers have speculated that Drew was actually Louisa's biological child from an affair with Robert Craig. Craig was an actor in Louisa's company at the Arch Street Theatre. According to biographer James Kotsilibas-Davis, Craig and Lane spent a notable amount of time together before he suddenly was fired from the Arch Street company. Drew's brother, John Jr., also noted Craig attending events with the family, such as going to see Charles Dickens when he was on tour. Lane then left Philadelphia for a considerable amount of time before returning with Sidney. Ethel Barrymore, Drew's niece, wrote in her autobiography "Sidney may not have been the son of John Drew, but he was indubitably the son of Mrs. John Drew."

Drew came from an acting dynasty. His mother was an actress and theatre manager, while her parents and grandparents were also actors, singers, and managers. His aunt was actress Georgiana Kinlock. Drew's siblings John Jr. and Georgiana were also stage actors. Through his siblings he was uncle to the Barrymore acting family - Lionel, Ethel, and John Barrymore - and was uncle to Georgie Drew Mendum and Louise Drew. He had one more confirmed sister, Louisa, who was not an actress.

Drew made his stage debut at 14 years old with Lenonard Grovers' comedy, Our Boarding House. He attended preparatory schools in his youth, before attending the University of Pennsylvania.

== Career ==
In 1882, when Drew was 19 years old, he began to pursue acting seriously, much like his family. In his stage career, Drew was a light-hearted leading man along with his wife, Gladys Rankin, the first "Mrs. Sidney Drew". By 1893, the pair had established Mr. and Mrs. Sidney Drew's Comedy Company. Drew's mother and acclaimed actress Louisa Lane Drew would tour with the company. Other cast members included Charles Verner, Owen Fancett, and Drew's nephew Lionel Barrymore. In 1896, the pair introduced legitimate drama to the vaudeville stage.

Following Rankin's death in 1914, Drew was briefly paired with Clara Kimball Young, with whom Drew starred in the two-reel melodrama satire Goodness Gracious; or, Movies as they Shouldn't Be (1914).

Following his marriage to Lucille McVey, he added her to his one-reel comedies, acknowledging McVey as both a writer and co-director. As a comedy team, known as Mr. & Mrs. Sidney Drew, the team perfected the situation comedy style that the team of John Bunny and Flora Finch started. Their style of comedy was usually gentle satire on married life, but also poked fun at the world of show business. Drew took sole credit as director for two five-reel features at Vitagraph, the groundbreaking cross-gender comedy A Florida Enchantment (1914), in which Edith Storey played the leading female role, and the drama Playing Dead (1915), the Drews' only attempt at a "serious" film.

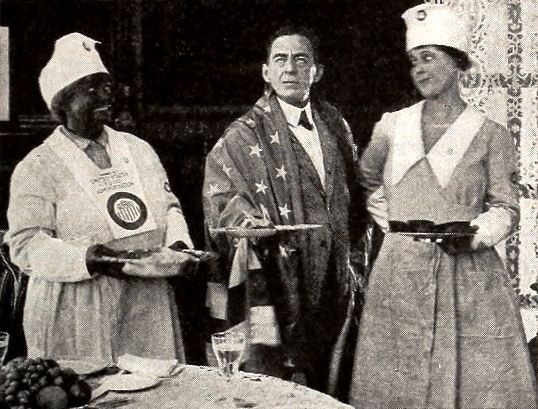
Still of Drew, Lucille McVey, and unidentified actress in The Patriot (1917)

In 1916, the popular team was lured to Richard A. Rowland and Louis B. Mayer's newly founded Metro company, where they continued to dominate in the field of marital comedy.

Following the death of Drew's son in 1918, he fell into depression. The team left Metro for personal appearances but was signed to V.B.K.

Drew's final role had him returning to the stage in March 1919, a month before his sudden death. He and McVey starred in a production of John Hunter Booth's Keep Her Smiling. He was in Detroit, Michigan for a performance when he died.

== Personal life ==
Drew married Gladys Rankin, daughter of actors McKee Rankin and Kitty Blachard, on July 22, 1889 at St. Francis Xavier Church in Phildadelphia. They had one child, actor Sidney Rankin Drew in 1891. Drew was very close with his son and when Rankin Drew was killed-in-action in 1918 during World War I, Drew fell into a depression.

"Dear father, your good wishes, your love and your pride is all that any son can ask from his father, and certainly it is all that I want and makes me more happy than any so-called present... Father, thank you a thousand, million times for your sweetness and belief..." Sidney Rankin Drew in a letter to Drew, November 15, 1917

Gladys died in January 1914 from undisclosed causes. Drew remarried to Lucille McVey, a Vitagraph scriptwriter who briefly went under the name Jane Morrow, just six months after Rankin's death.

Drew died of uraemic posioning on April 9, 1919, after a short illness in Detroit. He was interred in Mount Vernon Cemetery in Philadelphia. A showing of Harold, the Last of the Saxons, the first Paramount-Drew comedy was show in New York theatres to honor him.

=== Legacy ===
Mr. and Mrs. Sidney Drew have a joint star on the Hollywood Walk of Fame. They are listed three times—once for Sidney and twice more for his two wives, Gladys Rankin and Lucille McVey.

== Selected filmography ==
- Jerry's Mother-In-Law (1913)
- Beauty Unadorned (1913)
- Too Many Husbands (1914)
- A Florida Enchantment (1914)
- Boobley's Baby (1915)
- Fox Trot Finesse (1915) (Short)
- Diplomatic Henry (1915) (Short)
- Help (1916) (Short)
- Taking a Rest (1916) (Short)
- His Fourth Tooth (1916) (Short)
- Pay Day (1918)
- Romance and Rings (1919) (Short)
- Bunkered (1919) (Short)

== Theatre ==
Year	Title	Role	Notes	Ref
1893	The Rivals	Bob Acres		
1910	Billy			
1919	Keep Her Smiling		Final role	

== Bibliography ==
- Barrymore, Ethel (1955). Memories: An Autobiography. Harper.
- Drew, John (1922). My Years on the Stage. New York: E. P. Dutton.
- Kelly, Rivka (2014). The Duchess: An Analysis of the Life and Legacy of Louisa Lane Drew (PDF). Scholarworks: University of Vermont.
- Lane Drew, Louisa; Taylor, Douglas (1899). Autobiographical sketch of Mrs. John Drew. New York, New York: C. Scribner's Sons.
- Rankin Drew, Sidney (1921). McVey, Lucille (ed.). Life and Letters of Sidney Rankin Drew. Cheltenham Press.
