= Arthur Rankin (actor) =

American actor (1895–1947)

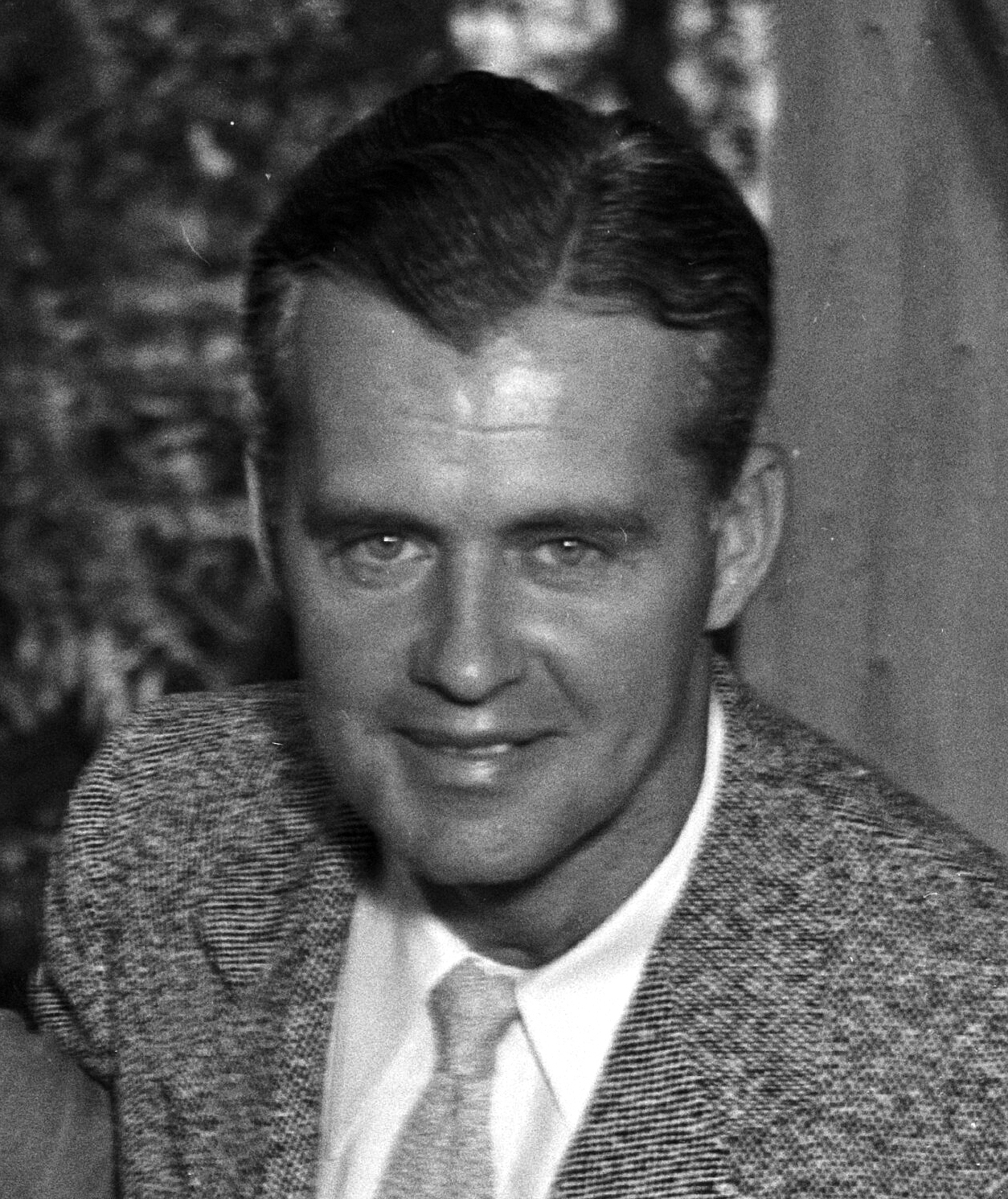
- Born: Arthur Gardner Gibbs; August 30, 1895; New York City, U.S.
- Died: March 23, 1947 (aged 51); Los Angeles, California, U.S.
- Occupation: Actor
- Years active: 1914–1941 (film)
- Spouse: Marian Mansfield
- Children: 2, including Arthur Rankin Jr.
- Mother: Phyllis Rankin
- Relatives: Harry Davenport (step-father); Dorothy Davenport (step-sister)

Arthur Gardner Rankin Sr. (August 30, 1895 – March 23, 1947) was an American film actor.

== Personal life ==
Arthur Gardner Gibbs was born in New York City to actress Phyllis Rankin and theatre manager Henry D. Gibbs. His parents would divorce in 1899 and Rankin maintained custody of him and his sister, Catherine. The siblings would live in London with Phyllis while she was on performing a three year stint for The Belle of New York. Phyllis met and began a relationship with actor Harry Davenport during this time. They would eventually marry in 1901 and Davenport legally adopted Arthur.

Rankin served in the United States Marine Corps during World War I, and received a medical discharge in 1918. He then joined the British Army. During World War II, Rankin rejoined the Marine Corps. Rankin married Marian Mansfield, and they had two sons, one of them being animator Arthur Rankin Jr.

He died on March 22, 1947, of a cerebral hemorrhage.

== Selected filmography ==
- Silas Marner (1916)
- Romance (1920)
- The Truth About Husbands (1920)
- The Great Adventure (1921)
- The Lure of Jade (1921)
- The Five Dollar Baby (1922)
- To Have and to Hold (1922)
- Enter Madame (1922)
- The Call of the Canyon (1923)
- Discontented Husbands (1924)
- Vanity's Price (1924)
- Broken Laws (1924)
- The Fearless Lover (1925)
- Tearing Through (1925)
- Speed (1925)
- Sun-Up (1925)
- Pursued (1925)
- The Love Gamble (1925)
- The Sporting Lover (1926)
- The Man in the Shadow (1926)
- The Hidden Way (1926)
- The Millionaire Policeman (1926)
- Riding to Fame (1927)
- The Woman Who Did Not Care (1927)
- The Blood Ship (1927)
- Slightly Used (1927)
- The Adventurous Soul (1927)
- The Wife's Relations (1928)
- Domestic Troubles (1928)
- Walking Back (1928)
- Say It with Sables (1928)
- Making the Varsity (1928)
- Runaway Girls (1928)
- Submarine (1928)
- Code of the Air (1928)
- Ships of the Night (1928)
- Companionate Marriage (1928)
- Below the Deadline (1929)
- The Fall of Eve (1929)
- The Unwritten Law (1932)
- Trailing North (1933)
- The Thrill Hunter (1933)
- Men of the Night (1934)
- Unknown Woman (1935)
- The Public Menace (1935)
- Case of the Missing Man (1935)
- Roaming Lady (1936)
- The Cowboy Star (1936)
- Two-Fisted Gentleman (1936)
- Midnight Taxi (1937)
- Second Honeymoon (1937)
- Thanks for Everything (1938)
- Quick Millions (1939)
- Here I Am a Stranger (1939)

== See also ==
- Arthur Rankin Jr.

== Bibliography ==
- Munden, Kenneth White. The American Film Institute Catalog of Motion Pictures Produced in the United States, Part 1. University of California Press, 1997.
