= Kitty Blanchard =

American actress

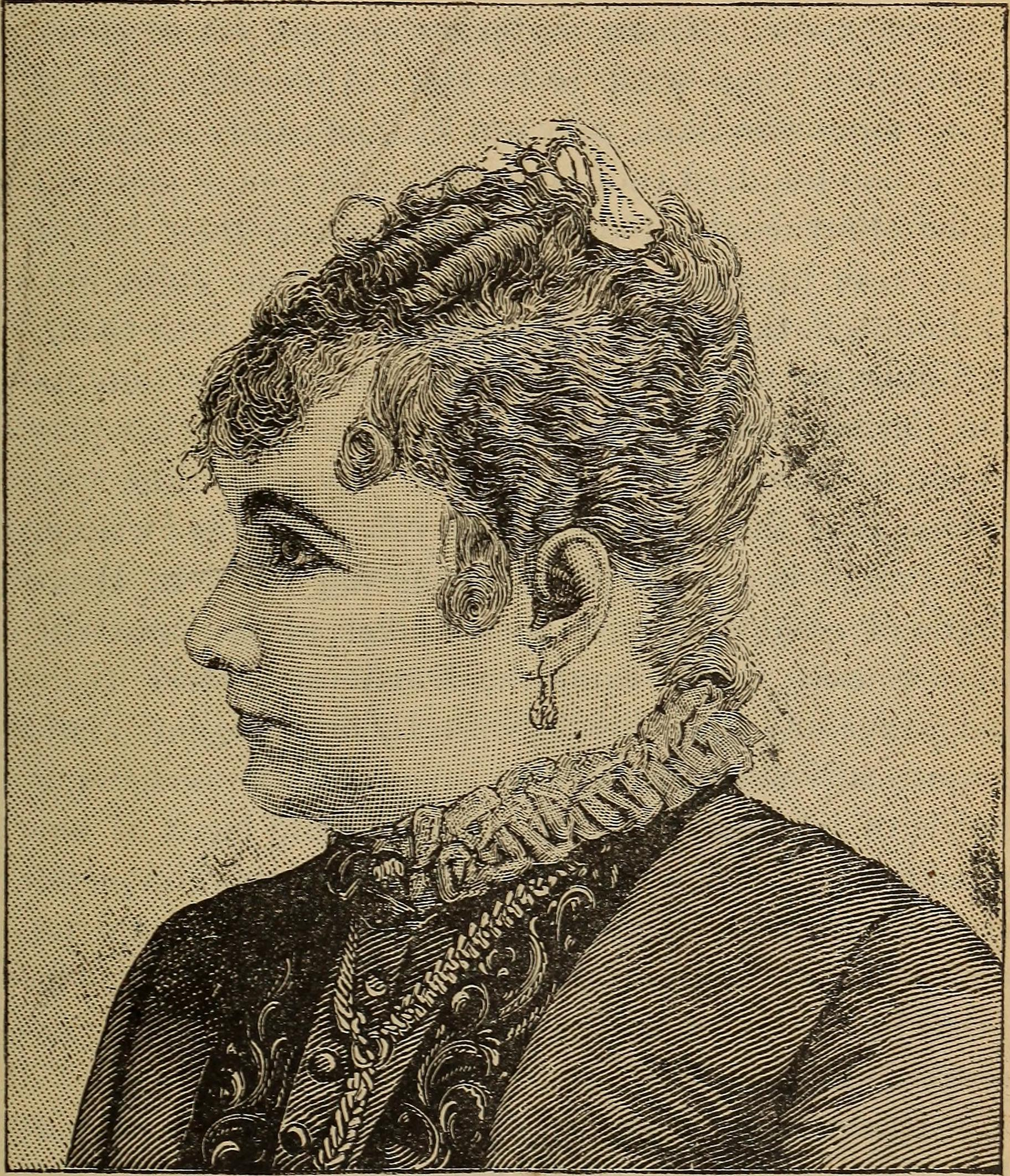
- Born: Elizabeth Blanchard c. 1847; Philadelphia, Pennsylvania, U.S.
- Died: December 14, 1911 (aged 63–64); New York City, U.S.
- Resting place: Kensico Cemetery, Valhalla, New York
- Other names: Katherine Blanchard True; Kitty Blanchard Rankin; Kitty Rankin; Mrs. McKee Rankin; Mrs. Oliver Rankin
- Occupation: Actress
- Spouse: McKee Rankin (m. 1869)
- Children: 3, including Phyllis Rankin
- Relatives: Doris Rankin (stepdaughter)

Elizabeth "Kitty" Blanchard (c. 1847 – December 14, 1911) was an American stage actress from Pennsylvania.

== Life ==
In the 1870s she costarred along with Kate Claxton in the popular hit play The Two Orphans. In 1894 she was a member of the cast in the New York production of Arms and the Man, one of the earliest American appearances of a George Bernard Shaw play. Towards the end of her life, she and McKee Rankin came out of retirement in October 1911 and performed in a play called Peace on Earth.

== Family ==
A popular actress in 1870s and 1880s, she married actor McKee Rankin (1841–1914).

They had two daughters, Gladys and Phyllis Rankin. A third child Doris appears to have been born from McKee's extramarital affair with actress Mabel Bert. Gladys married Sidney Drew in the early 1890s, of the Drew acting family. They were the parents of S. Rankin Drew. Phyllis became the second wife of Harry Davenport, whose sister was Fanny Davenport, a reigning actress of the late Victorian era. Harry had a daughter from a previous marriage, Dorothy who later married matinee idol Wallace Reid. Phyllis had a son out of wedlock, Arthur Rankin, who was adopted by Harry when he married Phyllis. Arthur Rankin Jr. was Phyllis's grandson. He is the Rankin in Rankin/Bass Productions.

== Death ==
Rankin died December 14, 1911, in her bathtub in her hotel suite at the Belleclaire Hotel in New York City. She was using the name Mrs. Oliver Rankin and was listed in newspapers as being 70 years old. First buried at Green-Wood Cemetery in Brooklyn, she was moved on June 20, 1913, to the Rankin-Davenport family plot (which bears no individual markers) at Kensico Cemetery in Valhalla, New York.
