= Louisa Lane Drew =

English-born American actress (1820–1897)

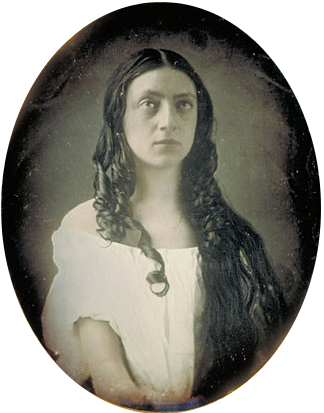
- Drew as Ophelia circa 1840–48
- Born: Louisa Lane; January 10, 1820; London, England
- Died: August 31, 1897 (aged 77); Larchmont, New York, U.S.
- Resting place: Mount Vernon Cemetery, (Philadelphia, Pennsylvania)
- Other names: Mrs. John Drew; The Duchess
- Occupations: Stage actress Theater manager
- Years active: 1820–1897
- Spouses: Henry B. Hunt (m. 1836–1847) George Mossop (m. 1848; died 1849) John Drew (m. 1850; died 1862)
- Children: Louisa Drew; John Drew Jr. Georgiana Drew; Sidney Drew (adopted)
- Relatives: Georgiana Kinlock (half-sister)
- Family: Drew family

Louisa Lane Drew (January 10, 1820 – August 31, 1897) was an English-born British American actress and theatre owner-manager, and an ancestor of the prominent Barrymore-Drew acting family. Professionally, she was often billed and known as Mrs. John Drew, while her acting company would refer to her as The Duchess.

Lane was the manager of the Arch Street Theatre in Philadelphia, Pennsylvania, a position that she held for 31 years. Under her direction, the theater became one of the United States' most successful stock companies. At the time, Lane was claimed to be the "most noted woman today on the American stage".

== Early life ==
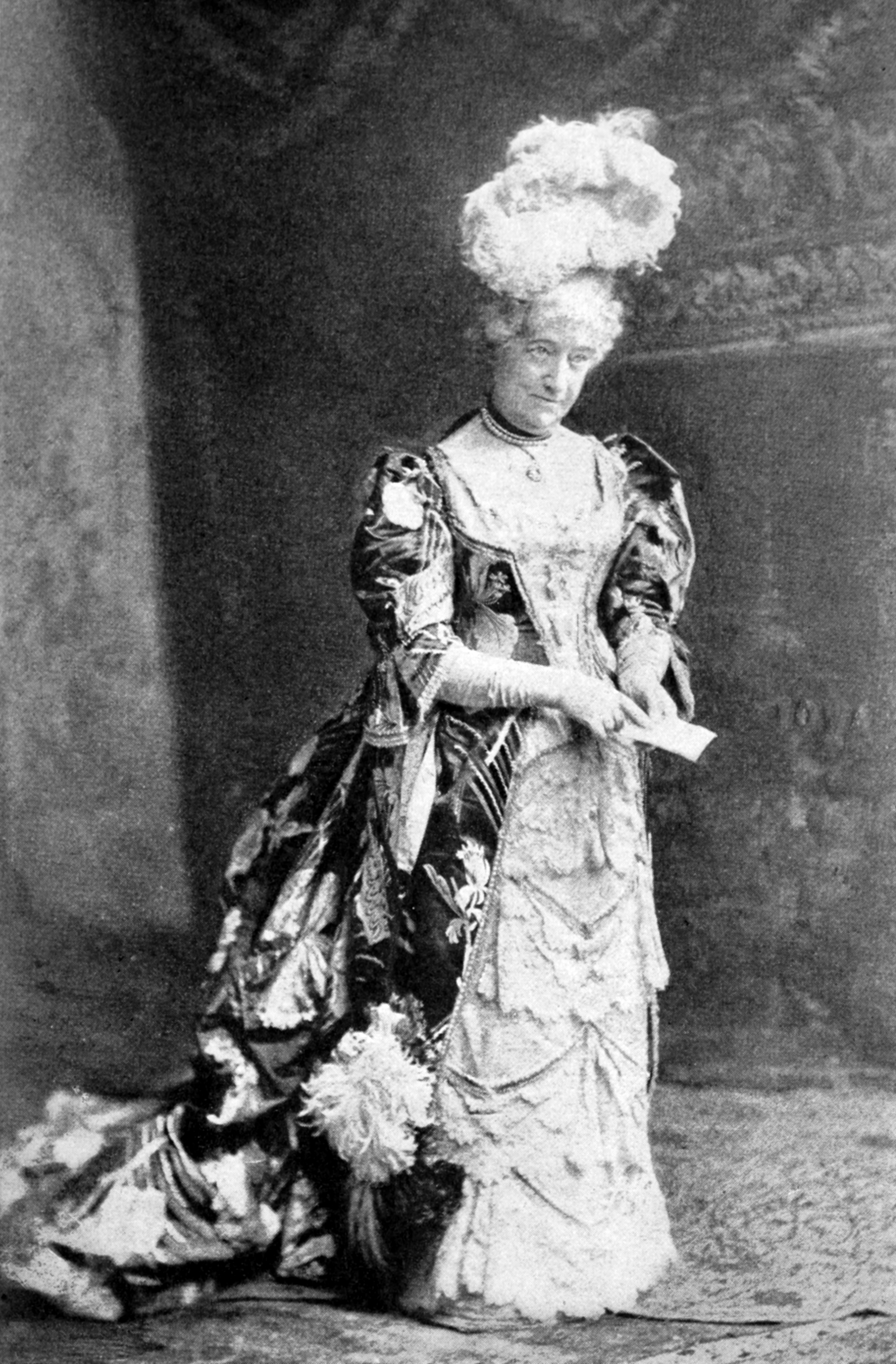
Mrs. John Drew (a.k.a. Louisa Lane Drew, 1820–1897), in role as Mrs. Malaprop in an all-star Broadway theatre revival of The Rivals in New York City, (1895)

Louisa Lane was born January 10, 1820, in Lambeth Parish, London, England, as the daughter of Eliza Trentner (1796–1887), a singer and actress, and Thomas Frederick Lane (1796–1825), an actor and theatre manager. Lane's paternal grandparents, Thomas Haycraft Lane and Louisa Rouse, were also actors. Lane made her stage debut when she was just twelve months old alongside her mother in a production of Giovanni in London. She acted in a number of roles during her childhood, including Meg Murnock and a production of Presumption; or, the Fate of Frankenstein, where she portrayed the scientist's younger brother and acted alongside T.P. Cooke. This was the first recorded theatrical adaptation of the novel.

Her father died around 1825, prompting Lane and her mother to sail to the Americas the following year and arrived in New York on June 7, 1827. She made her American stage debut in September 1827, as Margaretta in No Song, No Supper, at the Walnut Street Theater in Philadelphia. Later that month, she would also appear as the young Duke of York in Richard III, alongside Junius Brutus Booth. Her New York stage debut would happen in March 1828 at the Bowery Theater, where she led as Little Pickle in The Spoiled Child. She proved to be a child prodigy playing five different adult roles within one play at the age of eight in 1828. An 1829 article described her with a "talent for and a knowledge of the stage beyond what we find in many experienced performers of merit".

Her mother remarried in 1828 to English actor and stage manager John Kinlock. She would gain three half-sisters, Adine (b. 1827), Georgiana (b.1829), and Rosalie Kinlock (b. 1830). The family set sail to Jamaica in November 1830 with Kinlock attempting to find better job opportunities. The ship wrecked, leaving the family and all passengers stranded for six weeks in San Domingo. Lane celebrated her 11th birthday stranded before eventually being rescued and taken to Kingston, Jamaica.

In 1831, Kinlock and baby Rosalie died of yellow fever while in Jamaica. Trenter also became sickly, however recovered the following year and returned the family to Philadelphia. Her mother took her and Adine on another voyage to the West Indies in 1833, however the ship would once again wreck on a sandbar in Egg Harbor, West Indies. The family was eventually rescued and took a "wood boat" back to New York.

In 1833, Lane began touring the United States with the Bowery Theater Stock Company. She often acted in male roles, such as Romeo, Mark Antony, and other Shakespearan characters. By 1836, she was playing a leading lady opposite of Edwin Forrest. That year, she married actor Henry Blaine Hunt and the couple, along with her mother, did traveling performances. Lane was praised for her work and gained recognition in a number of papers. The Louisana Courier wrote that she would "in time, decorate her young brow with that brightest and most durable coronal of worth – public approval".

== Adult career ==
In 1838, she was employed as an actress at the Walnut Street Theatre, where she stayed on rotation until 1850. She would be paid $20 a week, the highest salary paid there at the time. During her time there, she would perform alongside a number of high-profile actors – Tyrone Power, Ellen Tree, Mary Ann Vincent, Charlotte Cushman, the Booths, Fanny Davenport, and more.

=== The Arch Street Theatre ===
After her marriage to actor John Drew in 1850, the pair would tour together. In 1852, they joined James Quinlan's stock company at the Chesnut Street Theatre, however would move to the Arch Street Theatre by the end of the season. The next year, Drew was appointed as manager of the Arch. He would often leave the theatre to do travel performances, leaving stockholders unhappy. He would leave the position in 1855. In 1861, stockholders would appoint Lane as the manager, citing her "experience, ability, good taste, and judgement". The theatre would be renamed to Mrs. John Drew's Arch Street Theater. The Arch was a competitor theatre of the still standing Walnut Street Theatre.

In her first season as manager, she appeared in forty-two acting roles while attending to her duties. She would often use her own popularity to draw crowds to the theatre. She performed in hundreds of plays during her time, receiving heavy praise. Her 1860–61 season saw her performing in more than sixty different roles.

The first season under Lane's leadership proved unprofitable, as it had been for many years, and Lane would have to borrow money weekly to pay actors. The building was also heavily mortgaged. It wasn't until 1861, that the theatre would actually turn a profit. Under her direction, the theater became one of the United States' most successful stock companies.

In her first year, Lane did a complete renovation. She introduced new seating, upholstery, chandeliers, gas fittings, wardrobes, machinery and more. During her first season, Lane witnessed a deadly fire at William Wheatley's Continental Theatre, that resulted in the death of seven ballerinas – she would give a benefit performance for the survivors soon after. This event lead to her advertising her "fireproof" theatre to invite in scared audiences. In 1863, Lane convinced stockholders to make an additional $20,000 in renovations to the theatre. She removed her bar, a signal to ban prostitutes from attending, allowing her female audience base to grow. The stage was also enlarged, giving her the second largest on in Philadelphia.

She would introduce a new form of payment for her actors. At the time, actors were paid through profits of special 'benefit' performances. Instead, she chose to pay actors after every performance, giving all actors a share of the total profits. Lane ensured she paid her actors every Saturday, personally, for her entire career. Another common practice at the time was for actors to be paid solely for performances, not rehearsals, leaving actors stranded when they closed. Lane implemented daily rehearsals and performances at nighttime. This would allow actors to be paid on a consistent timeline. This practice drew a variety of actors to the company and by the early twentieth century, most other theatres began to implement this and her salary system.

Lane also enforced a strict daily rehearsal schedule, something that was not common practice. Lines were expected to be learned in a timely manner and proper appearance and dedication were requirements. Her commitment to the stage and to the theatre's appearance would lend to its prestige. The company became known as a place for actors to train and refine their craft. During the Civil War, many renowned performers appeared under her management – Forest, Cushman, Edwin Booth, and John Wilkes Booth. Lane would star alongside Wilkes Booth in Macbeth, his last role before his assassination of 16th President of the United States, Abraham Lincoln, at the end of the American Civil War. Famed author Charles Dickens was also a patron of the theatre, at the request of Lane herself.

At its height, the Arch reported a yearly profit of $20,000 (around $654,000 in 2026). By 1892, the theatre had begun to cease being profitable again due to the changing theater touring and residency systems. Lane chose to retire as manager due to this. Her final acting role at the Arch was in 1892 as Widow Green in Love Chase. She held the manager position for 31 years.

=== Later years ===
Near the end of her stage career, in May 1895, the aged Lane appeared in an all-star revival of Anglo-Irish playwright Richard Brinsley Sheridan's, The Rivals. Her final public performance was in late 1896, in a production of The Sporting Duchess at the Academy of Music in New York.

Her autobiography, Autobiographical Sketch of Mrs. John Drew, was published in 1899, two years after her death, by her son. It was dedicated to her husband John Drew.

== Personal life ==
In 1836, at the age 16, Lane married Irish actor Henry Blaine Hunt, who was 40 years old. They would divorce in 1847 and Lane remarried to Irish singer and comedian George Messop in 1848. Messop would die the following year. In 1850, she would marry her third husband, Irish-American actor John Drew. She and Drew would have three children together – Louisa Eliza, John Jr., and Georgiana. She had no known children from her first two marriages.

After her husband's 1862 death, Lane reportedly adopted a baby boy and named him Sidney Drew. Despite Lane's claims, her own family and modern critics believe that Sidney was Lane's biological son of an affair with actor Robert Craig. According to biographer James Kotsilibas-Davis, Craig and Lane spent a notable amount of time together before he suddenly was fired from the Arch Street company. Lane's son, John Jr., also noted Craig attending events with the family, such as going to see Charles Dickens when he was on tour. Lane then left Philadelphia for a considerable amount of time before returning with Sidney. Ethel Barrymore, Lane's granddaughter, wrote in her autobiography "Sidney may not have been the son of John Drew, but he was indubitably the son of Mrs. John Drew."

Lane's sister, popular actress Georgina Kinlock, would die in 1864. Her mother, Eliza, would die years later in 1887 at the age of 92.

When her daughter, Georgiana, died in 1893, Lane took responsibility for the three children, while their father, Maurice Barrymore, remained on tour. Eventually Lane would give up their Philadelphia residence and move into a boardinghouse. The children were sent to live with their Uncle Sidney (referred to as Uncle Googan) and his family.

== Death ==
In 1897, an ailing Louisa Drew spent her last summer at her annual retreat at Larchmont, in upstate New York, with her young grandsons Lionel and John Barrymore.

Louisa Drew died on August 31, 1897, at the age of 77 years at her country estate retreat in Larchmont, New York of Westchester County, and her body was initially interred at the Glenwood Cemetery and eventually later moved to the Mount Vernon Cemetery, both cemeteries on the outskirts of Philadelphia, Pennsylvania.

=== Legacy ===
She was the grandmother through her daughter Georgie of John, Ethel, and Lionel Barrymore, all prominent actors of the thespian Barrymore-Drew family. Her other grandchildren were Georgie Drew Mendum, Edmund Mendum, Louise Drew, and Sidney Rankin Drew. She is also the great-great-grandmother of another generation of the extended acting family, actress Drew Barrymore.

The historic Arch Street Theatre in Philadelphia that the Drew-Barrymores owned and managed, was demolished in 1936, but the other Walnut Street Theatre still stands in Philadelphia, as one of the nation's oldest theatres.

== Theatre ==
Year	Title	Role	Theatre	Notes	Ref.
1820	Giovanni in London	Crying Baby			
1825	Meg Murnock				
1825	Presumption; or, the Fate of Frankenstein	William Frankenstein			
1826	Timour, the Tartar	Prince Agib			
1827	No Song, No Supper	Margaretta	Walnut Street Theater		
1827	Richard III	Young Duke of York	Walnut Street Theater		
1828	Twelve Precisley	Matilda Mowbray / Master Hector Mowbray / Master Connleton Mowbray / Master Foppington Mowbray	Walnut Street Theater		
1828	The Spoiled Child	Little Pickle	Bowery Theater		
1833	Thalaba the Destroyer	Marmina	Bowery Theater		
1842	Wedding Day	Lady Contest	Park Theatre		
1842	Blanche Heriot	Blanche Heriot	Park Theatre		
1842	Mothers and Daughters	Mabel Trevor	Park Theatre		
1842	Recruiting Officer	Sylvia	Park Theatre		
1842	Yankee Land	Josephine	Park Theatre		
1842	Broken Hearts	Mary Acorn	Park Theatre		
1843	John of Paris	Vincent	Park Theatre		
1845	Money	Clara			
1845	Love Chase	Constance	Park Theatre		
1845	Young Scamp	Joseph	Park Theatre		
1864	Wives as They Were, etc	Miss Dorillon	Arch Street Theatre		
1864	Follies of the Night	Duchess de Chartres	Arch Street Theatre		
1864	Belle's Strategem	Letitia Hardy	Arch Street Theatre		
1864	Loan of a Lover	Gertrude	Arch Street Theatre		
1864	Somebody Else	Minnie	Arch Street Theatre		
1864	Magic Mirror	Marchioness de Valtera	Arch Street Theatre		
1864	Simpson & Co.	Mrs. Simpson	Arch Street Theatre		
1864	Nine Points of the Law	Mrs. Smilie	Arch Street Theatre		
1864	Naval Engagements	Miss Mortimer	Arch Street Theatre		
1864	Bold Stroke for a Husband	Donna Olivia	Arch Street Theatre		
1864	Agnes de Vere	Agnes	Arch Street Theatre		
1864	Rosedale	Rosa Leigh	Arch Street Theatre		
1865	Old Heads and Young Hearts	Lady Alice	Arch Street Theatre		
1865	Know Your Own Mind	Lady Bell	Arch Street Theatre		
1865	Lost in London	Nelly Armroyd	Arch Street Theatre		
1866	The Needful	Kate Harley	Arch Street Theatre		
1866	Fortunio and His Gifted Servants	Fortunio	Arch Street Theatre		
1866	Favorite of Fortune	Hester Lorrington	Arch Street Theatre		
1866	Fast Family	Clotilde	Arch Street Theatre		
1866	Women Will Talk	Miss Belle Gabbleton	Arch Street Theatre		
1866	The Winning Suit	Orelia	Arch Street Theatre		
1866	Griffith Gaunt	Kate Payton	Arch Street Theatre		
1867	100,000 Pounds	Alice Barlow	Arch Street Theatre		
1867	Surf	Mrs. Madison Noblee	Arch Street Theatre		
1867	Ours	Mary Nettley	Arch Street Theatre		
1867	Light at Last	Catherine Fairlawn	Arch Street Theatre		
1868	Maud's Peril	Lady Maud	Arch Street Theatre		
1868	Play	Rosie Farquhar	Arch Street Theatre		
1868	Does He Love Me?	Miss Vandeleur	Arch Street Theatre		
1868	A Wife Well Won	Marguerite de Launay	Arch Street Theatre		
1868	He's Got Money	Maude Hillary	Arch Street Theatre		
1868	Lancashire Lass	Ruth Kirby	Arch Street Theatre		
1868	Wolves at Bay	Lucy Drayton	Arch Street Theatre		
1868	Lesson in Love	Mrs. Sutherland	Arch Street Theatre		
1869	Twelfth Night	Viola	Arch Street Theatre		
1869	Tame Cats	Mrs. Harry Langley	Arch Street Theatre		
1869	Victim of Circumstances	Virginia de Merlot	Arch Street Theatre		
1869	Women Rule	Mrs. Winlove	Arch Street Theatre		
1869	School	Naomi Tighe	Arch Street Theatre		
1869	Black and White	Miss Milburn	Arch Street Theatre		
1869	Formosa	Jenny Baker	Arch Street Theatre		
1869	All's Well That Ends Well	Helena	Arch Street Theatre		
1869	Lost at Sea	Laura Franklin	Arch Street Theatre		
1869	Overland Route	Mrs. Sebright	Arch Street Theatre		
1869	Little Dorrit	Mrs. Clennam	Arch Street Theatre		
1870	Little Emily	Martha	Arch Street Theatre		
1870	Frou-Fron	Gilberte	Arch Street Theatre		
1870	Good-Natured Man	Mrs. Richland	Arch Street Theatre		
1870	Fernande	Countess Clotilde	Arch Street Theatre		
1870	Central Park	Mrs. Kerr Flamberry	Arch Street Theatre		
1870	Morning Call	Mrs. Chillingstone	Arch Street Theatre		
1870	As You Like It	Rosalind	Arch Street Theatre		
1870	Love's Sacrifice	Hermine de Velmont	Arch Street Theatre		
1871	Coquette	Mrs. Arthur Minton	Arch Street Theatre		
1871	A Happy Pair	Mrs. Honeyton	Arch Street Theatre		
1872	Wait and Hope	Alice Wainright	Arch Street Theatre		
1872	Romance of a Poor Young Man	Marguerite Loroque	Arch Street Theatre		
1872	Workingmen of Philadelphia	Martha Savage	Arch Street Theatre		
1872	A Roland for an Oliver	Maria Darlington	Arch Street Theatre		
1872	Isabelle	Isabelle	Arch Street Theatre		
1872	Ladies' Battle	Countess	Arch Street Theatre		
1872	Bohemia	Mrs. Augustus Poole	Arch Street Theatre		
1872	Uncle's Will	Florence Marigold	Arch Street Theatre		
1872	Son of the Night	Ghebel	Arch Street Theatre		
1873	False Shame	Mrs. Col. Howard	Arch Street Theatre		
1873	More Precious than Gold	Lady Lonsdale	Arch Street Theatre		
1873	Cool as a Cucumber	Wiggins	Arch Street Theatre		
1873	Dead Shot	Louisa Lovetrick	Arch Street Theatre		
1874	Mother's Love	Madame Bertha	Arch Street Theatre		
1877	Overland Route	Mrs. Lovebond	Arch Street Theatre		
1876	Running a Corner	Elvira Bangs	Arch Street Theatre		
1879	The Rivals	Mrs. Malaprop	Arch Street Theatre		
1892	Love Chase	Widow Green	Arch Street Theatre		
1894	The Road to Ruin	Widow Warren			
1895	The Rivals				
1896	The Sporting Duchess		Academy of Music	Final public performance	
