= Lionel Barrymore =

American actor, director, screenwriter (1878–1954)

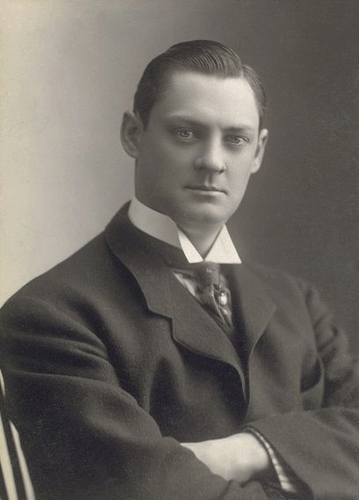
- Barrymore c. 1910
- Born: Lionel Herbert Blyth; April 28, 1878; Philadelphia, Pennsylvania, U.S.
- Died: November 15, 1954 (aged 76); Los Angeles, California, U.S.
- Occupations: Actor; director
- Years active: 1893–1954
- Political party: Republican
- Spouses: Doris Rankin (m. 1904; div. 1922) Irene Fenwick (m. 1923; died 1936)
- Children: 2
- Parent(s): Maurice Barrymore; Georgiana Drew
- Family: Barrymore; Drew

Lionel Barrymore (born Lionel Herbert Blyth; April 28, 1878 – November 15, 1954) was an American actor of stage, screen and radio as well as a film director. He won an Academy Award for Best Actor for his performance in A Free Soul (1931) and is known to modern audiences for the role of villainous Mr. Potter in Frank Capra's 1946 film It's a Wonderful Life.

He is also particularly remembered as Ebenezer Scrooge in annual broadcasts of A Christmas Carol during his last two decades. He is also known for playing Dr. Leonard Gillespie in Metro-Goldwyn-Mayer's nine Dr. Kildare films, a role he reprised in a further six films focusing solely on Gillespie and in a radio series titled The Story of Dr. Kildare. He was a member of the theatrical Barrymore family.

== Early life ==
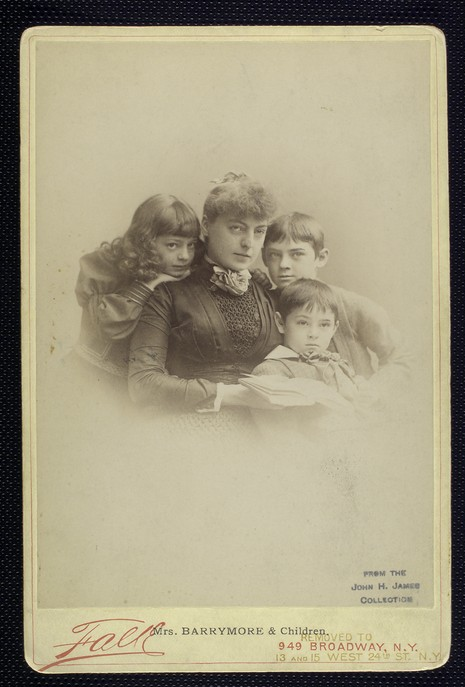
Young Lionel with John, Ethel, and their mother (1890)

Lionel Barrymore was born Lionel Herbert Blyth in Philadelphia, the son of actors Georgiana Drew Barrymore and Maurice Barrymore (born Herbert Arthur Chamberlayne Blyth). He was the elder brother of Ethel and John Barrymore, the uncle of John Drew Barrymore and Diana Barrymore and the great-uncle of Drew Barrymore, among other members of the Barrymore family. He attended private schools as a child, including the Art Students League of New York. While raised a Roman Catholic, Barrymore attended the Episcopal Academy in Philadelphia, but graduated from Seton Hall Preparatory School, the Roman Catholic college prep school, in the class of 1891.

== Career ==
=== Stage ===
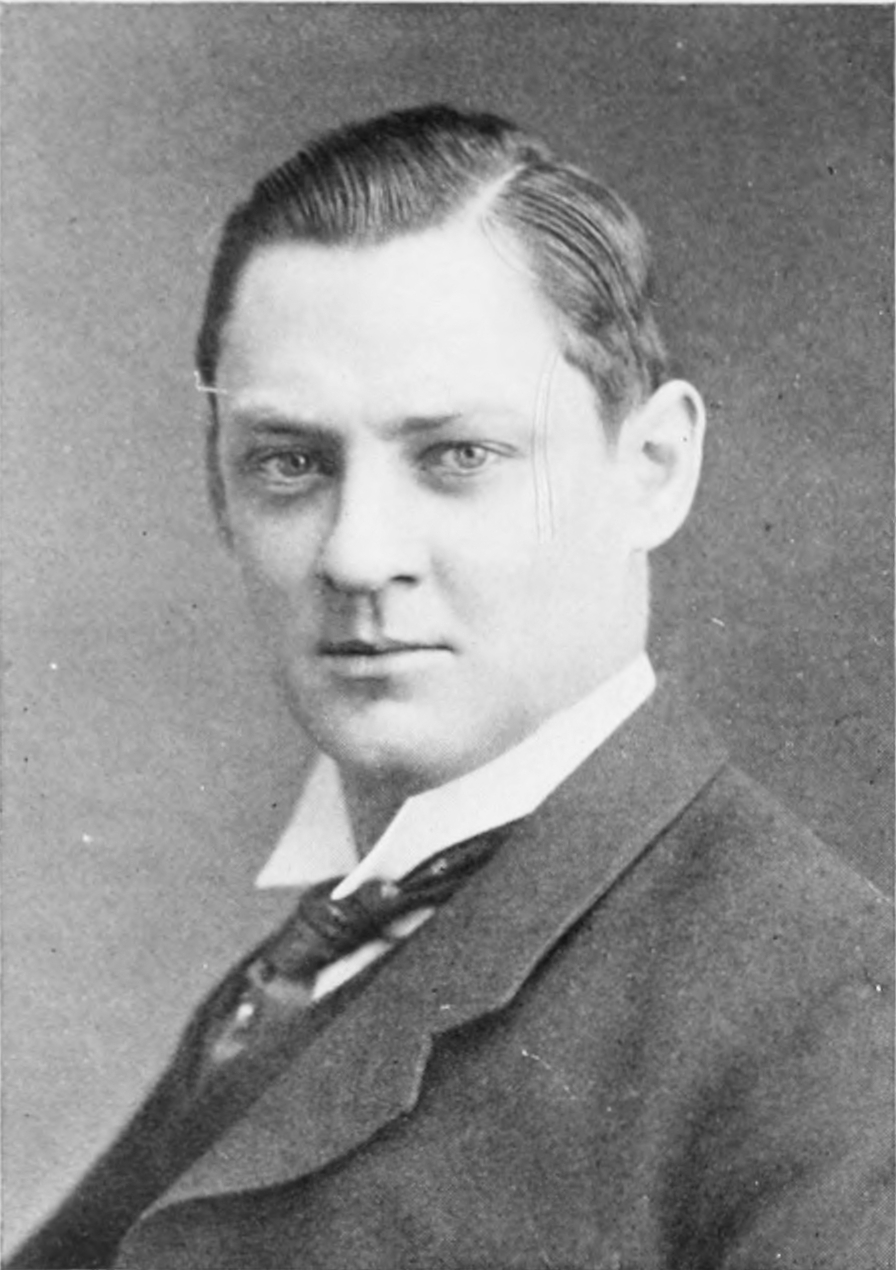
Barrymore, 1906

Reluctant to follow his parents' career, Barrymore appeared together with his grandmother Louisa Lane Drew on tour and in a stage production of The Rivals in 1893 at the age of 15. He later recounted that "I didn't want to act. I wanted to paint or draw. The theater was not in my blood, I was related to the theater by marriage only; it was merely a kind of in-law of mine I had to live with." Nevertheless, he soon found success on stage in character roles and continued to act, although he still wanted to become a painter and also to compose music. He appeared on Broadway in his early twenties with his uncle John Drew Jr. in such plays as The Second in Command (1901) and The Mummy and the Hummingbird (1902), the latter of which won him critical acclaim. The Other Girl in 1903–04 was a long-running success for Barrymore. In 1905, he appeared with John and Ethel in a pantomime, starring as the title character in Pantaloon and playing another character in the other half of the bill, Alice Sit-by-the-Fire.

In 1906, after a series of disappointing appearances in plays, Barrymore and his first wife, the actress Doris Rankin, left their stage careers and travelled to Paris, where he trained as an artist. Lionel and Doris were in Paris in 1908 when their first baby, Ethel, was born. Lionel confirms in his autobiography, We Barrymores, that he and Doris were in France when Bleriot flew the English Channel on July 25, 1909. He did not achieve success as a painter and in 1909 he returned to the US. In December of that year he returned to the stage in The Fires of Fate, in Chicago, but left the production later that month after suffering an attack of nerves about the forthcoming New York opening. The producers gave appendicitis as the reason for his sudden departure. Nevertheless, he was soon back on Broadway in The Jail Bird in 1910 and continued his stage career with several more plays. He also joined his family troupe, from 1910, in their vaudeville act, where he was happy not to worry as much about memorizing lines.

From 1912 to 1917 Barrymore was away from the stage again while he established his film career, but after the First World War he had several successes on Broadway, where he established his reputation as a dramatic and character actor, often performing with his wife. He returned to the stage in Peter Ibbetson (1917) with his brother, John, and achieved star billing in The Copperhead (1918) (with Doris). He retained star billing for the next 6 years in plays such as The Jest (1919) (again with John) and The Letter of the Law (1920). Lionel gave a short-lived performance as MacBeth in 1921 opposite veteran actress Julia Arthur as Lady MacBeth, but the production encountered strongly negative criticism. His last stage success was in Laugh, Clown, Laugh, in 1923, with his second wife, Irene Fenwick; they met while acting together in The Claw the previous year, and after they fell in love he divorced his first wife. He also received negative notices in three productions in a row in 1925. After appearing in Man or Devil in 1926, he signed a film contract with MGM and after the advent of sound films in 1927, he never again appeared on stage.

=== Film ===
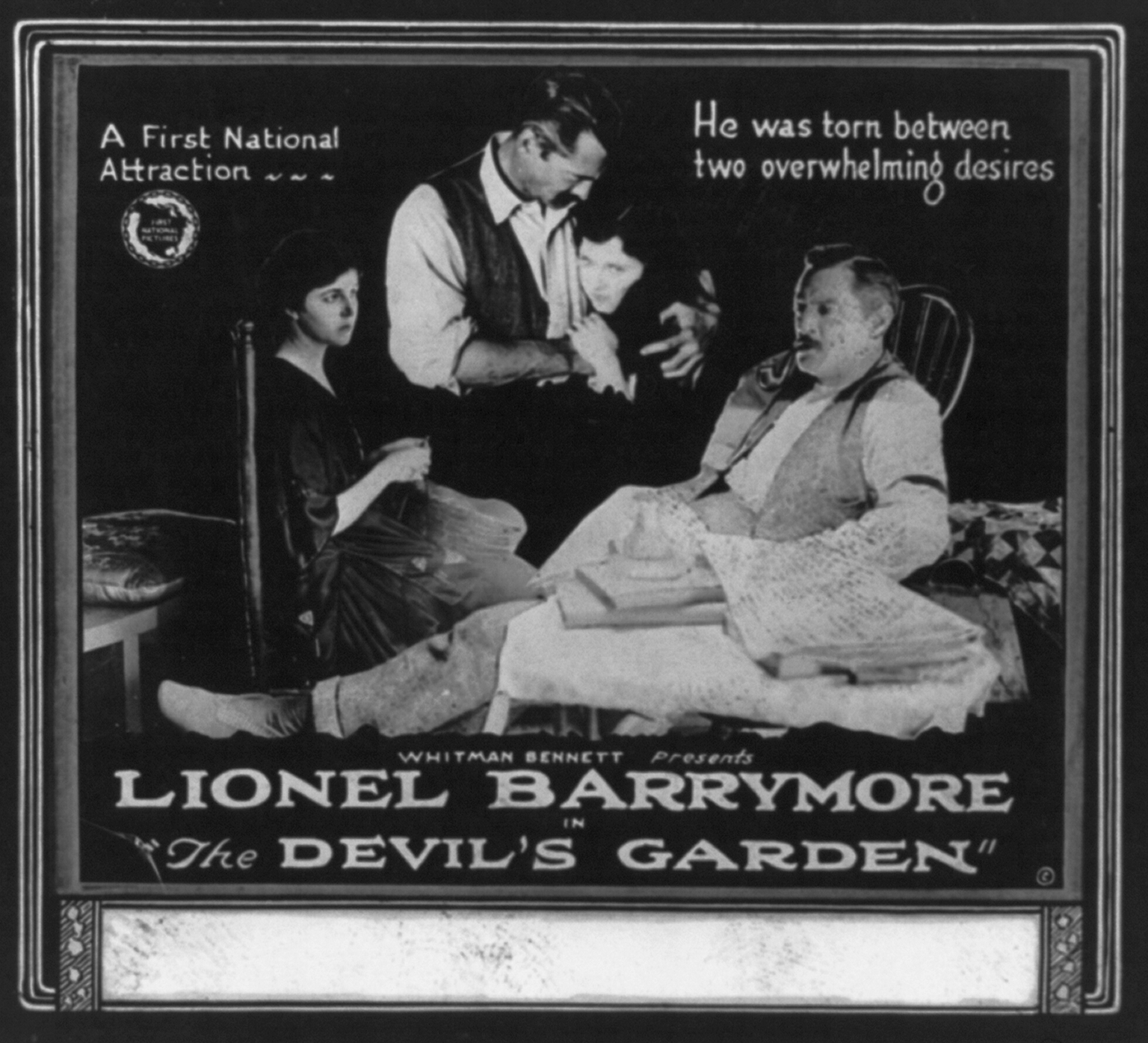
Lionel and first wife Doris (in rocking chair) in the 1920 silent film The Devil's Garden

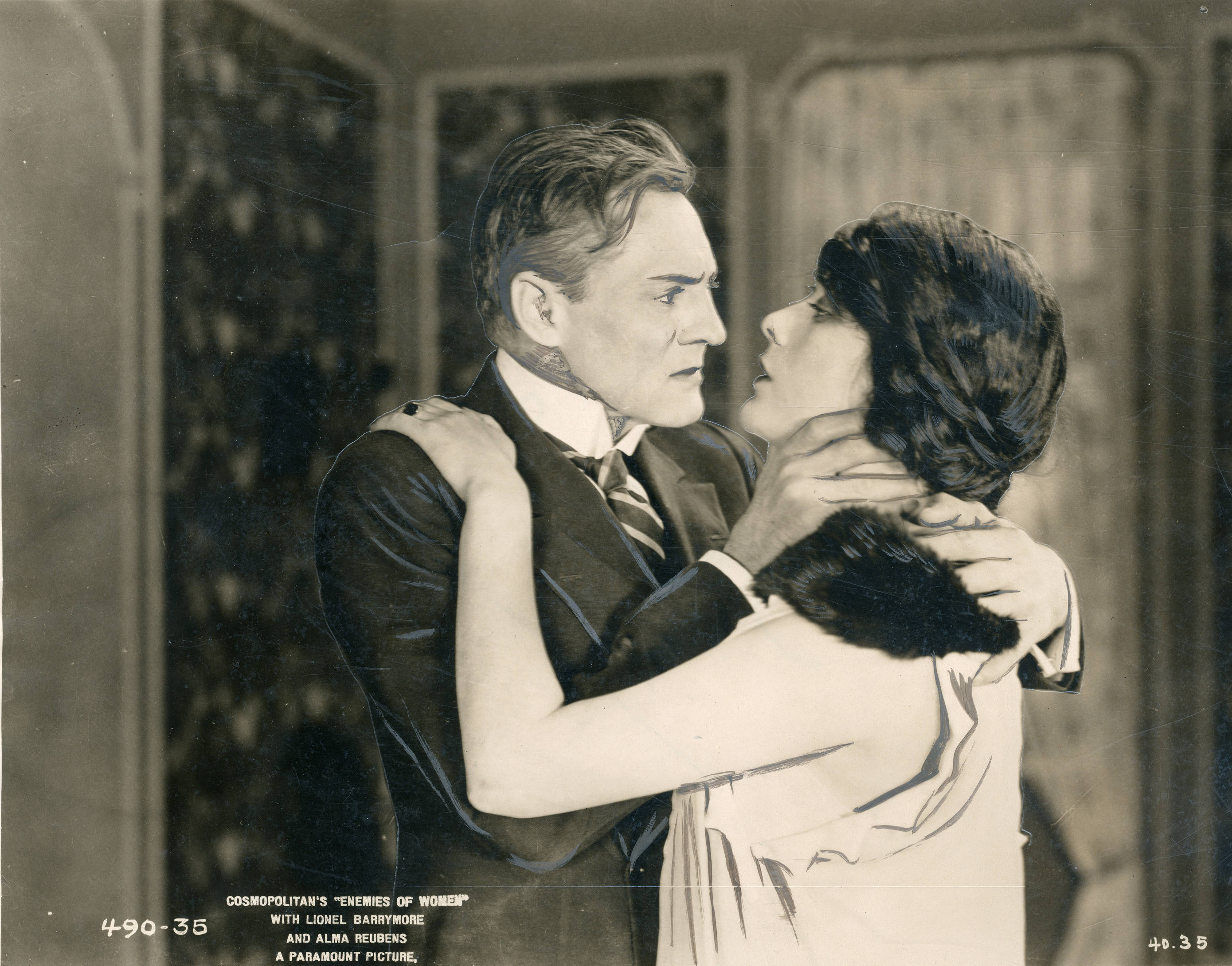
Lionel Barrymore and Alma Rubens in Enemies of Women (1923)

Barrymore joined Biograph Studios in 1909 and began to appear in leading roles by 1911 in films directed by D. W. Griffith. Barrymore made The Battle (1911), The New York Hat (1912), Friends, and Three Friends (1913). In 1915, he co-starred with Lillian Russell in a movie called Wildfire, one of the legendary Russell's few film appearances. He also was involved in writing and directing at Biograph. The last silent film he directed, Life's Whirlpool (Metro Pictures, 1917), starred his sister, Ethel. He acted in more than 60 silent films with Griffith.

In 1920, Barrymore reprised his stage role in the film adaptation of The Copperhead. Also in 1920, he starred in the lead role of The Master Mind, with Gypsy O'Brien co-starring.

Before the formation of Metro-Goldwyn-Mayer in 1924, Barrymore forged a good relationship with Louis B. Mayer early on at Metro Pictures. He made several silent features for Metro, some of which are now lost. In 1923, Barrymore and Fenwick went to Italy to film The Eternal City for Metro Pictures in Rome, combining work with their honeymoon. He occasionally freelanced, returning to Griffith in 1924 to film America. In 1925, he left New York for Hollywood.

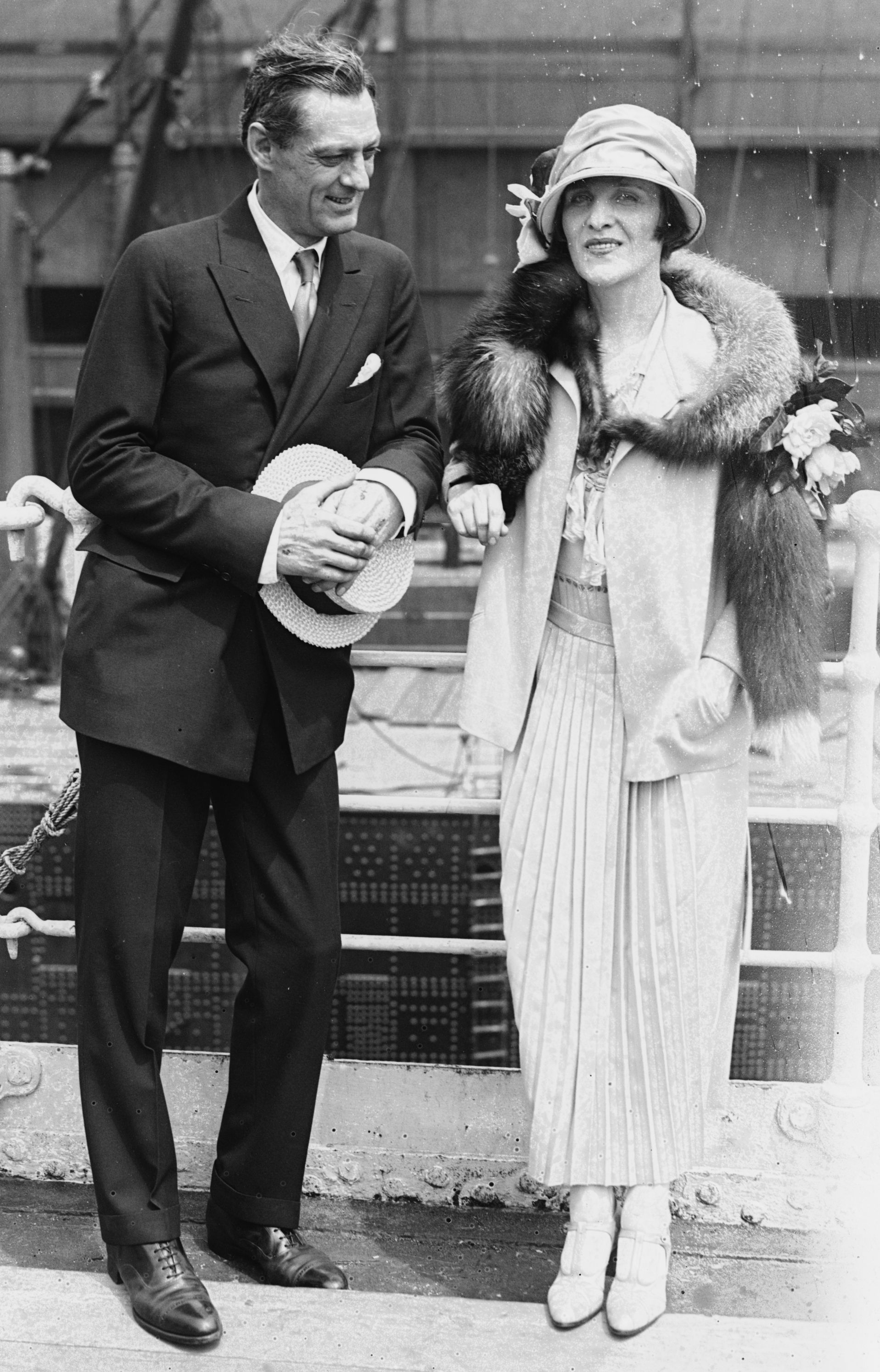
With second wife Irene Fenwick, 1923

Prior to his marriage to Irene, Barrymore and his brother John engaged in a dispute over the issue of Irene's chastity in the wake of her having been one of John's lovers. The brothers didn't speak again for two years and weren't seen together until the premiere of John's film Don Juan in 1926, by which time they had patched up their differences. Barrymore signed a contract with Metro-Goldwyn-Mayer in 1926 and his first picture there was The Barrier. His first talking picture was The Lion and the Mouse; his stage experience allowed him to excel in delivering the dialogue in sound films.

On the occasional loan-out, Barrymore had a big success with Gloria Swanson in 1928's Sadie Thompson and the aforementioned Griffith film, Drums of Love. In 1929, he returned to directing films. During this early and imperfect sound film period, he directed the controversial His Glorious Night, with John Gilbert; Madame X, starring Ruth Chatterton; and The Rogue Song, Laurel and Hardy's first color film. He was credited with being the first director to move a microphone on a sound stage. Barrymore returned to acting in front of the camera in 1931. In the following year, he won an Academy Award for his role as an alcoholic lawyer in A Free Soul (1931), after being considered in 1930 for Best Director for Madame X. He played alongside Greta Garbo in the 1931 film "Mata Hari". He could play many characters, like the evil Rasputin in the 1932 Rasputin and the Empress (in which he co-starred for the only time with siblings John and Ethel) and the ailing Oliver Jordan in Dinner at Eight (1933 — also with John, although they had no scenes together). He played Professor Zelen, the Occultist expert, in the classic horror Mark of the Vampire (1935).

On April 27, 1939, Louis B. Mayer threw Barrymore a 61st birthday party (the day before his actual birthday), broadcast live on Good News of 1939, and required all MGM employees to attend. This was likely intended to distract from, and prevent MGM attendance of, the Confessions of a Nazi Spy premiere that occurred simultaneously. The film was highly controversial due to its anti-Nazi message.

During the 1930s and 1940s, he became stereotyped as a grouchy but sweet elderly man in such films as The Mysterious Island (1929), Grand Hotel (1932, with John Barrymore), Little Colonel (1935, with Shirley Temple and Bill "Bojangles" Robinson), Captains Courageous (1937), Saratoga (1937, with Jean Harlow), You Can't Take It with You (1938), On Borrowed Time (1939, with Cedric Hardwicke), Duel in the Sun (1946), Three Wise Fools (1946), and Key Largo (1948).

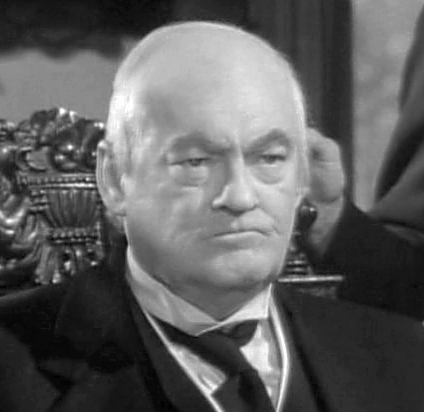
Portraying Mr. Potter in It's a Wonderful Life (1946)

In a series of Doctor Kildare movies in the 1930s and 1940s, he played the irascible Doctor Gillespie, a role he repeated in an MGM radio series that debuted in New York in 1950 and was later syndicated. Barrymore had broken his hip in an accident, hence he played Gillespie in a wheelchair. Later, his worsening arthritis kept him in the chair. The injury also precluded his playing Ebenezer Scrooge in the 1938 MGM film version of A Christmas Carol, a role Barrymore played every year but two (replaced by brother John Barrymore in 1936 and replaced by Orson Welles in 1938) on the radio from 1934 through 1953. He also played the title role in the 1940s radio series Mayor of the Town.

He is well known for his role as Mr. Potter, the miserly and mean-spirited banker in It's a Wonderful Life (1946) opposite James Stewart.

He had a role with Clark Gable in Lone Star in 1952. His final film appearance was a cameo in Main Street to Broadway, an MGM musical comedy released in 1953. His sister Ethel also appeared in the film.

== Personal life ==
Barrymore was married twice, to actresses Doris Rankin and Irene Fenwick, a one-time lover of his brother, John. Doris's sister Gladys was married to Lionel's uncle Sidney Drew, which made Gladys both his aunt and sister-in-law. Doris Rankin bore Lionel two daughters, Ethel Barrymore II and Mary Barrymore. Neither child survived infancy. Barrymore never truly recovered from the deaths of his girls and their loss undoubtedly strained his marriage to Doris Rankin, which ended in 1922. Years later Barrymore developed a fatherly affection for Jean Harlow, who was born about the same time as his daughters. When Harlow died in 1937, Barrymore and Clark Gable mourned her as though she had been family.

=== Political views ===
Barrymore was a Republican. In 1944, he attended the massive rally organized by David O. Selznick in the Los Angeles Coliseum in support of the Dewey-Bricker ticket as well as Governor Earl Warren of California, who would become Dewey's running mate in 1948 and later the Chief Justice of the United States. The gathering drew 93,000, with Cecil B. DeMille as the master of ceremonies and with short speeches by Hedda Hopper and Walt Disney. Among the others in attendance were Ann Sothern, Ginger Rogers, Randolph Scott, Adolphe Menjou, Gary Cooper, Edward Arnold, William Bendix, and Walter Pidgeon.

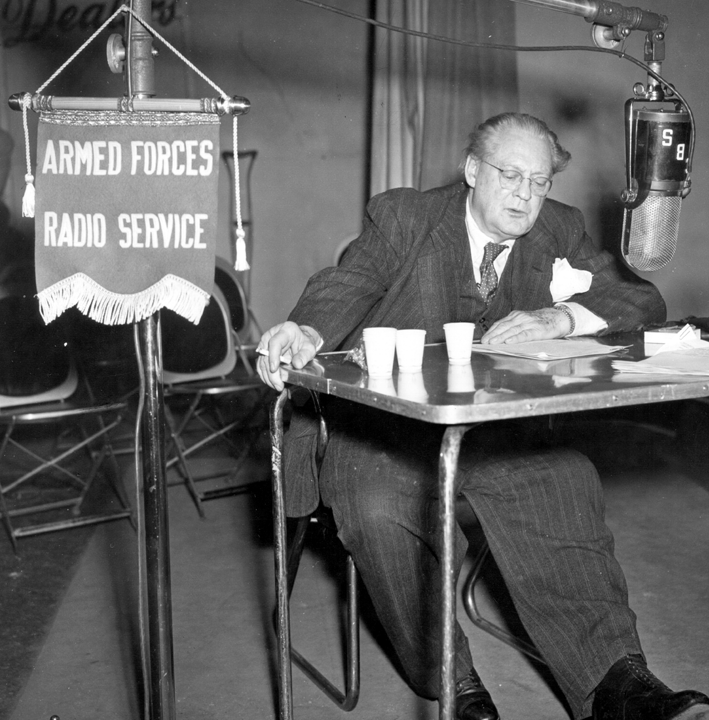
Hosting "Concert Hall" for Armed Forces Radio Service during World War II, c. 1942

Barrymore registered for the draft during World War II, despite his age and disability, to encourage others to enlist in the military.

He loathed the income tax, and by the time he was appearing on Mayor of the Town, MGM withheld a sizable portion of his paychecks, paying the IRS the amount he owed.

=== Medical issues ===
Several sources argue that arthritis alone led Barrymore to use a wheelchair. Film historian Jeanine Basinger says that his arthritis was serious by at least 1928, when Barrymore made Sadie Thompson. Film historian David Wallace says it was well known that Barrymore was dependent on morphine due to arthritis by 1929. A history of Oscar-winning actors, however, says Barrymore was only suffering from arthritis, not crippled or incapacitated by it. Marie Dressler biographer Matthew Kennedy notes that when Barrymore won his Best Actor Oscar award in 1931, the arthritis was still so minor that it only made him limp a little as he went on stage to accept the honor. Barrymore can be seen being quite physical in late silent films like The Thirteenth Hour and West of Zanzibar, where he can be seen climbing out of a window.

Paul Donnelly says Barrymore's inability to walk was caused by a drawing table falling on him in 1936, breaking Barrymore's hip. Barrymore tripped over a cable while filming Saratoga in 1937 and broke his hip again. (Film historian Robert Osborne says Barrymore also suffered a broken kneecap.) The injury was so painful that Donnelly, quoting Barrymore, says that Louis B. Mayer bought $400 worth of cocaine for Barrymore every day to help him cope with the pain and allow him to sleep. Author David Schwartz says the hip fracture never healed, which was why Barrymore could not walk, and MGM historian John Douglas Eames describes the injury as "crippling". Barrymore himself said in 1951, that it was breaking his hip twice that kept him in the wheelchair. He said he had no other problems, and that the hip healed well, but it made walking exceptionally difficult. Film historian Allen Eyles reached the same conclusion.

Lew Ayres biographer Lesley Coffin and Louis B. Mayer biographer Scott Eyman argue that it was the combination of the broken hip and Barrymore's worsening arthritis that put him in a wheelchair. Barrymore family biographer Margot Peters says Gene Fowler and James Doane said Barrymore's arthritis was caused by syphilis, which they say he contracted in 1925. Eyman, however, explicitly rejects this hypothesis.

Whatever the cause, Barrymore's performance in Captains Courageous in 1937 was one of the last times he would be seen standing and walking unassisted. On his next picture, Saratoga, Barrymore tripped over a cable on set, breaking his hip for the second time in two years and reportedly breaking his knee cap. Afterward, Barrymore was able to get about for a short period of time on crutches even though he was in great pain. During the filming of 1938's You Can't Take It With You, the pain of standing with crutches was so severe that Barrymore required hourly shots of painkillers. By 1938, Barrymore's disability forced him to relinquish the role of Ebenezer Scrooge (a role he made famous on the radio) to British actor Reginald Owen in the MGM film version of A Christmas Carol. From then on, Barrymore used a wheelchair exclusively and never walked again. He could, however, stand for short periods of time such as at his brother's funeral in 1942.

=== Composer, artist, novelist ===
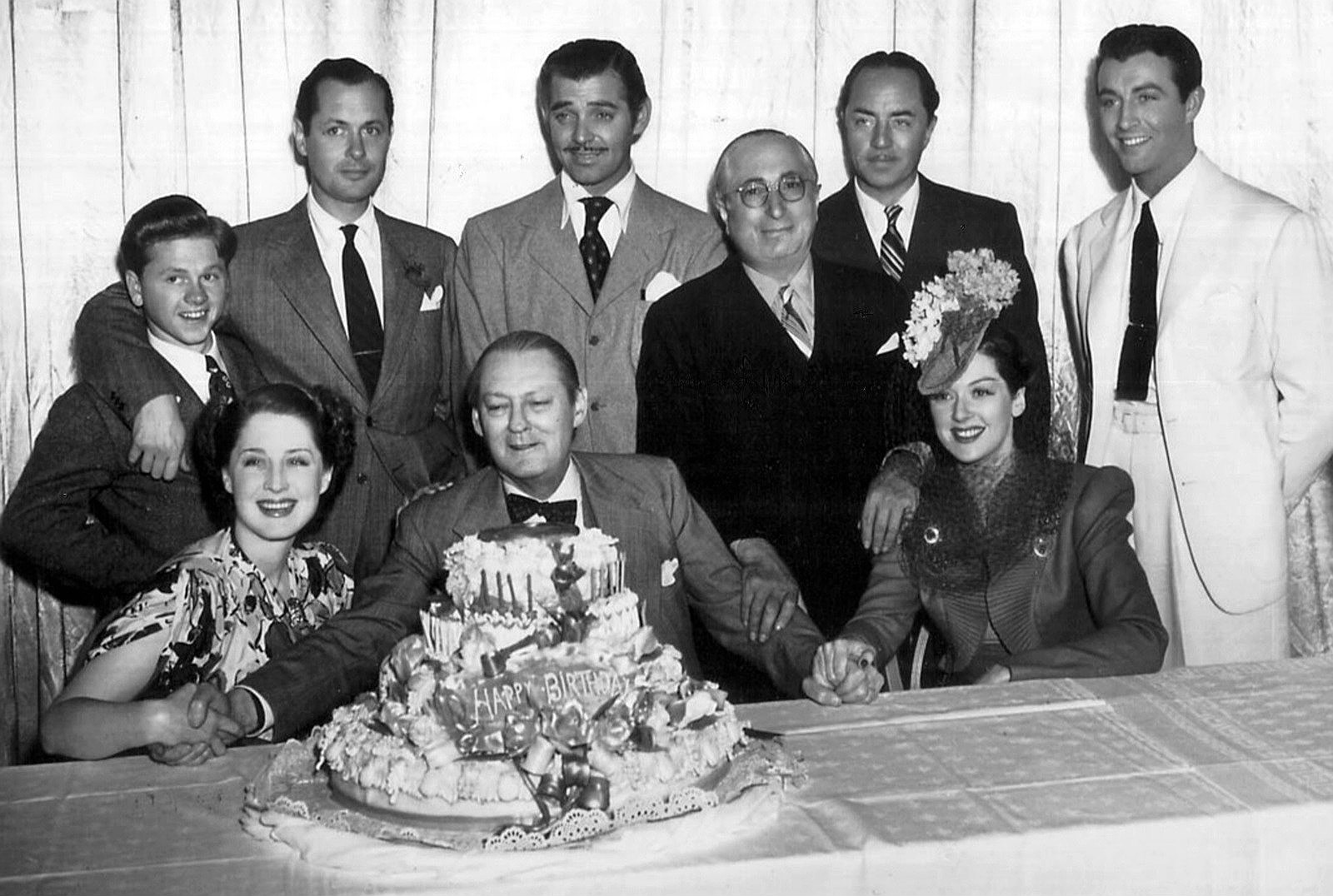
Lionel Barrymore's 61st birthday in 1939, standing: Mickey Rooney, Robert Montgomery, Clark Gable, Louis B. Mayer, William Powell, Robert Taylor, seated: Norma Shearer, Lionel Barrymore, and Rosalind Russell

Barrymore also composed music. His works ranged from solo piano pieces to large-scale orchestral works, such as "Tableau Russe", which was performed twice in Dr. Kildare's Wedding Day (1941) as Cornelia's Symphony, first on piano by Nils Asther's character and later by a full symphony orchestra. His piano compositions, "Scherzo Grotesque" and "Song Without Words", were published by G. Schirmer in 1945. Upon the death of his brother John in 1942, he composed a work "In Memoriam", which was performed by the Philadelphia Orchestra. His orchestral Partita was given multiple performances. He also composed the theme song of the radio program Mayor of the Town.

Barrymore had attended art school in New York and Paris and was a skillful illustrator, creating etchings and drawings and was a member of the Society of American Etchers, now known as the Society of American Graphic Artists. For years, he maintained an artist's shop and studio attached to his home in Los Angeles. Some of his etchings were included in the Hundred Prints of the Year.

He wrote a historical novel, Mr. Cantonwine: A Moral Tale (1953).

He was also a horticulturalist, growing roses on his Chatsworth Ranch.

== Death ==
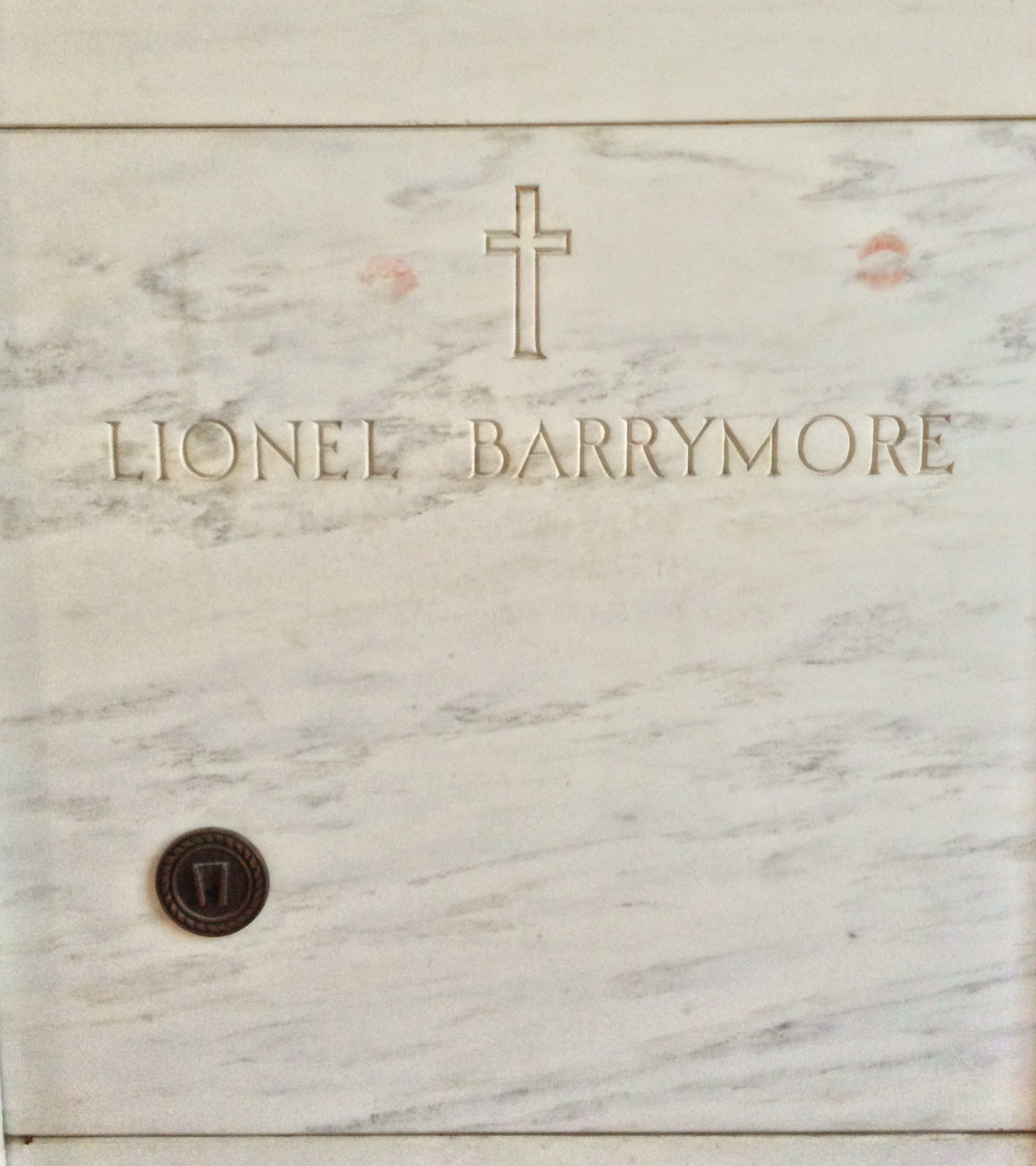
Barrymore's crypt at Calvary Cemetery

Barrymore died on November 15, 1954, aged 76, from a heart attack in the Van Nuys neighborhood of Los Angeles. He was entombed in the Calvary Cemetery in East Los Angeles.

== Tributes ==
Barrymore received two stars on the Hollywood Walk of Fame in 1960—a motion pictures star and a radio star. The stars are located at 1724 Vine Street for motion pictures, and 1651 Vine Street for radio. He was also inducted into the American Theater Hall of Fame, along with his siblings, Ethel and John.

== See also ==
- List of actors with Academy Award nominations

== Bibliography ==
- Barrymore, Lionel (1951). We Barrymores. New York: Appleton-Century-Crofts. OCLC 594282.
- Basinger, Jeanine. Silent Stars. Hanover, NH: Wesleyan University Press, 2000.
- Bergan, Ronald; Fuller, Graham; and Malcolm, David. Academy Award Winners. New York: Smithmark Publishers, 1994.
- Block, Alex Ben and Wilson, Lucy Autrey. George Lucas's Blockbusting: A Decade-by-Decade Survey of Timeless Movies, Including Untold Secrets of Their Financial and Cultural Success. New York: itBooks, 2010.
- Byers, Paula K., ed. (1998). "The Barrymores". Encyclopedia of World Biography. Detroit, MI: Gale Research. ISBN 978-0-7876-2541-2.
- Coffin, Lesley L. Lew Ayres: Hollywood's Conscientious Objector. Jackson: University Press of Mississippi, 2012.
- Culbertson, Judi and Randall, Tom. Permanent Californians: An Illustrated Guide to the Cemeteries of California. Chelsea, VT: Chelsea Green Pub. Co., 1989.
- Donnelly, Paul. Fade to Black: A Book of Movie Obituaries. London: Omnibus, 2003.
- Eames, John Douglas. The MGM Story: The Complete History of Fifty Roaring Years. New York: Crown Publishers, 1975.
- Eyles, Allen. That Was Hollywood: The 1930s. London: Batsford, 1987.
- Eyman, Scott. Lion of Hollywood: The Life and Legend of Louis B. Mayer. New York: Simon and Schuster, 2005.
- Kennedy, Matthew. Marie Dressler: A Biography. Jefferson, NC: McFarland & Co., 2006.
- Kotsilibas-Davis, James (1981). The Barrymores: the Royal Family in Hollywood. New York: Crown Publishers. ISBN 978-0-517-52896-9.
- Marzano, Rudy. The Brooklyn Dodgers in the 1940s: How Robinson, MacPhail, Reiser, and Rickey Changed Baseball. Jefferson, NC: McFarland, 2005.
- Norden, Martin F. The Cinema of Isolation: A History of Physical Disability in the Movies. New Brunswick, NJ: Rutgers University Press, 1994.
- Osborne, Robert A. Academy Awards Illustrated: A Complete History of Hollywood's Academy Awards in Words and Pictures. La Habra, CA: E.E. Schworck, 1969.
- Peters, Margot (1990). The House of Barrymore. New York: Touchstone. ISBN 978-0-671-74799-2.
- Reid, John Howard. Hollywood Movie Musicals: Great, Good and Glamorous. Morrisville, NC: Lulu Press, 2006.
- Schwartz, David. Magic of Thinking Big. New York: Simon and Schuster, 1987.
- Silvers, Anita. "The Crooked Timber of Humanity: Disability, Ideology and the Aesthetic." In Disability/Postmodernity: Embodying Disability Theory. Mairian Corker and Tom Shakespeare, eds. New York: Continuum, 2002.
- Wallace, David. Lost Hollywood. New York: St. Martin's Press, 2001.
- Wayne, Jane Ellen. The Leading Men of MGM. New York: Carroll & Graf Publishers, 2005.
- Willian, Michael. The Essential It's a Wonderful Life: A Scene-by-Scene Guide to the Classic Film. Chicago: Chicago Review Press, 2006.
