= Pique (play) =

Play written by Augustin Daly

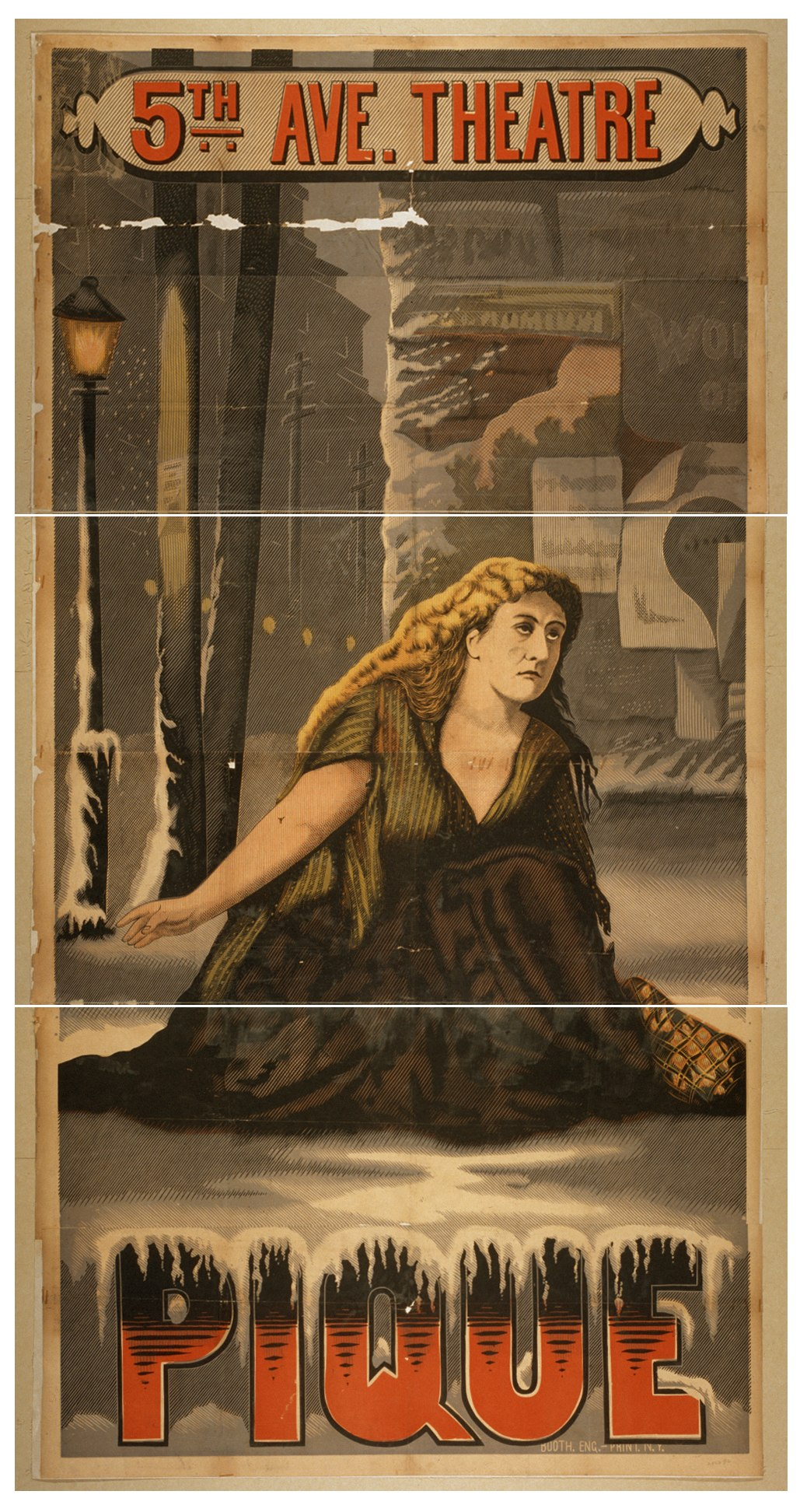
- Original language: English

Premiere
- Date: December 14, 1875
- Place: Daly's Fifth Avenue Theatre

Pique is an 1875 play produced by Augustin Daly, which had a very successful run of 237 consecutive performances in New York at the Fifth Avenue Theatre.

It was based in part on the Florence Marryat novel Her Lord and Master. The play debuted on December 14, 1875, and was withdrawn after Saturday, July 29,1876. It ran in at least two versions in London and also was produced on tour.

The original cast included Maurice Barrymore, where he met his future wife Georgiana Drew.

Though the play was a success, critical response varied from "highly laudatory puff pieces to accusations of excessive sentiment and irritating sensationalism."

== Original Broadway cast ==
- Charles Fisher as Matthew Standish
- D. H. Harkins as Arthur Standish
- Maurice Barrymore as Raymong Lessing
- Frank Hardenbergh as Rga-Monney Jim
- Belle Wharton as Little Arthur
- Fanny Davenport as Mabel Renfrew
- Mrs. G.H. Gilbert as Aunt Dorothy
- Kate Holland as Mother Thames
- Lizzie Griffiths as Sylvie
- John Brougham as Dr. Gossitt
- Jason Lewis as Sammy Dymple
- John Drew, Jr. as Thorsby Gyll
- C.H. Rockwell as Picker Bob
- William Pleater Davidge as Pedder
- W. Beekman as Rattlin
- J. Deaveau as Captain Spears
- Emily Rigl as Lucille Renfrew
- Jeffreys Lewis as Mary Standish (replaced by Georgiana Drew in April 1876)
- Sydney Cowell (daughter of Sam Cowell) as Raitch
