= Saratoga (play) =

1870 play by Bronson Howard

- Written by: Bronson Howard
- Original language: English

Premiere
- Date premiered: December 21, 1870
- Place premiered: Daly's Fifth Avenue Theatre

Saratoga; or Pistols for Seven is an 1870 American comedic play by Bronson Howard. It was Howard's first successful play, and the beginning of his long career as one of the foremost American playwrights of the 19th century.

== History ==
Howard first submitted the play to Laura Keene, who commended but declined it, and he then took it to Augustin Daly who had taken over management of the Daly's Fifth Avenue Theatre.

The play debuted on Wednesday, December 21, 1870. It ran for 101 performances (a very successful run at the time) and closed on March 27, 1871.

The Concise Oxford Companion to American Theatre calls Saratoga "one of the finest American 19th-century comedies." It was also among the first American plays to become popular abroad. A version in England adapted by Francis Albert Marshall was called Brighton (after the English seaside resort town), and in Germany Seine erste und eiznige Liebe (His First and Only Love), adapted by Paul Lindau.

Saratoga is considered important in the success of "American plays", arriving during an age when English and French plays were dominating playhouses. As one critic wrote in 1919, at the time of the play's debut, "the American drama--that is, plays written by Americans upon American subjects, giving faithful pictures of American life and manners--virtually did not exist."

== Adaptations and revivals ==
The play was performed around the United States for many years after its successful Broadway run. Daly also put it on again at his theatre. The first publication of the play in 1874 lists both the original 1870 cast and the cast of Daly's January 1874 production. The play was re-published in 1898, and newspapers reflect it still saw some productions into the first decade of the 20th century. Its strong popularity in the 1870s is evidenced by examples such as it being chosen in 1875 to be the first play performed at Cleveland's new Euclid Avenue Opera House.

In 1874, Charles Wyndham debuted in the English adaptation of the play called Brighton, and performed in it to great success for many years. Howard married Wyndham's sister in 1880.

In December 1978, the Royal Shakespeare Company performed the play at the Aldwych Theatre

In 1989, playwright Terrence McNally put on "Up In Saratoga", a complete rewrite based on the original and directed by Jack O'Brien, at the Old Globe Theatre in San Diego. It opened to negative reviews, and failed to make it to Broadway.

== Original cast ==
- James Lewis as Bob Sackett
- D.H. Harkins as Jack Benedict
- William Davidge as Papa Vanderpool
- David N. Whiting as Hon. William Carter
- George DeVere as Remington pere
- Arthur Mathison as Major Luddington Whist
- George Parkes as Sir Mortimer Muttonleg
- Fanny Davenport as Effie Remington
- Linda Dietz as Virginia Vanderpool
- Clara Morris as Lucy Carter
- Mrs. Gilbert as Mrs. Vanderpool
- Fanny Morant as Olivia Alston
- Amy Ames as Muffins
