= Mr. Barnes of New York =

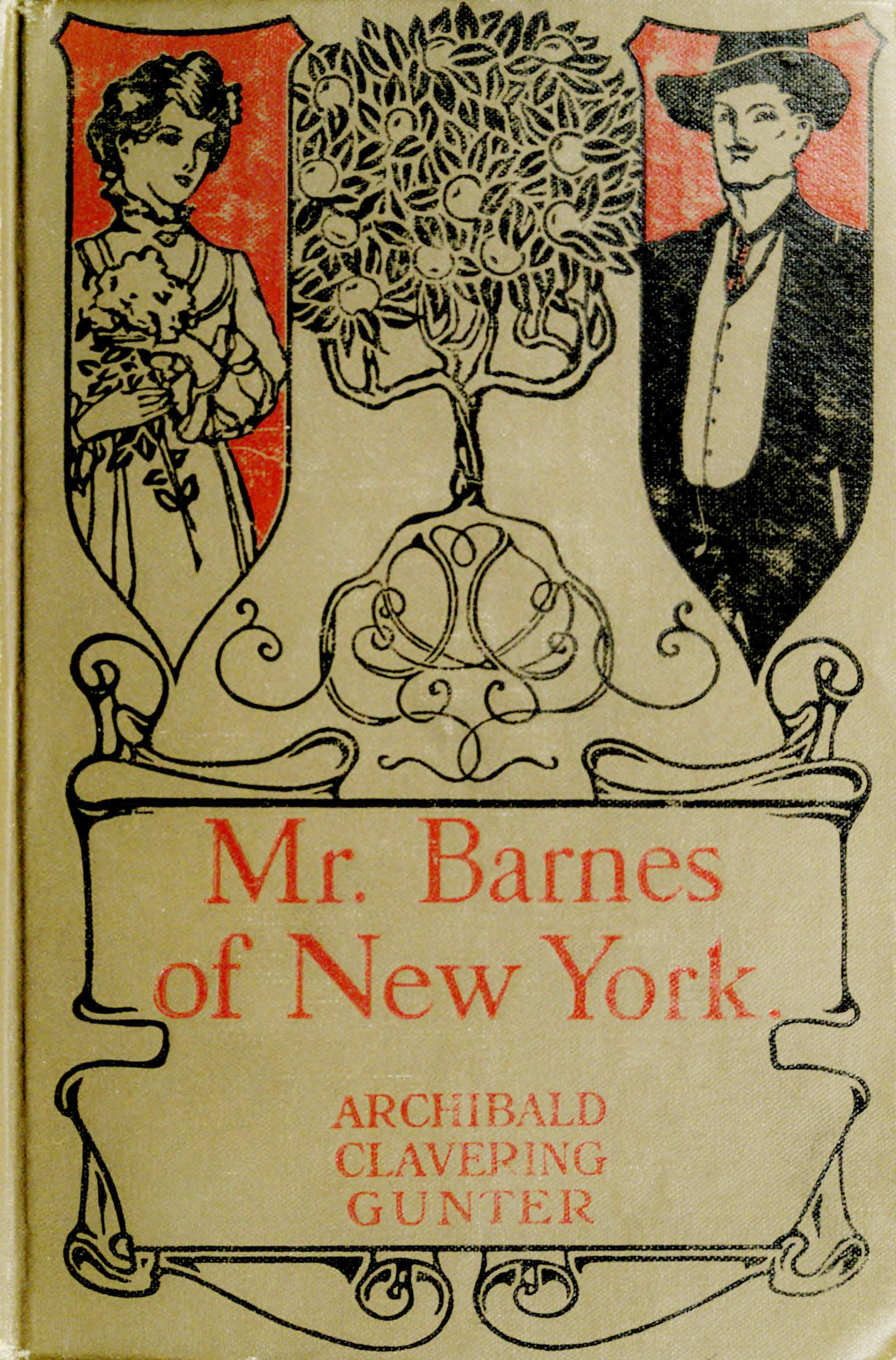
Hurst and Company edition cover

Mr. Barnes of New York is a novel published in 1887 by American author Archibald Clavering Gunter, quite popular in its day, which was also adapted into a play in 1888, and later two silent film versions.

== Novel ==
Although he already had success as a playwright, Gunter was unable to find a publisher for his first novel, which he had completed in 1885. He "submitted it to nearly every publisher in New York, and again and again it came back to him." He then tried a Boston publisher and more publishers in New York, and met another round of rejections. After shelving the manuscript for a time, he read a current popular novel, and decided that although his book "might be rubbish, it was surely as good as this book that seemed to have taken the fancy of the public." Gunter proceeded to publish the book himself, starting with 1,000 copies that bookstores would only take on consignment.

Within a few weeks, sales grew brisk and the book became quite popular. Scholar James D. Hart has written that although the book may not have sold a million copies as has been claimed, it and many of Gunter's successive novels were indeed popular. In 1910, a profile of this "best seller of yesterday" described "its success as instantaneous as it was astonishing. Everywhere−in railway trains and in the deck chairs of ocean liners−the paper covered yellow volume was to be seen." It also said "contemporary criticism was outspoken in its praise" of the book.

The plot revolves around the European travels and adventures of Burton H. Barnes, including a romance "with an English belle" and "involvement in a Corsican vendetta concerning his future brother-in-law."

In 1889, Gunter published the similarly named book (though not a sequel), Mr. Potter of Texas, which was also a best-seller. A sequel, entitled Mr. Barnes, American was published in 1907.

== Dramatic adaptation ==
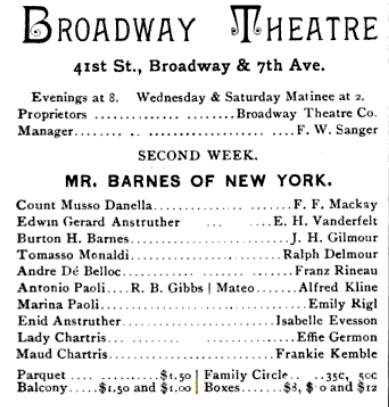
Advertisement for play in The Theatre, October 29, 1888

The first stage adaptation of the novel was written by Rutland Barrington, perhaps best remembered as creator of lead roles in many of the Gilbert & Sullivan operas, including Pooh-Bah in The Mikado. It opened at the Royal Olympic Theatre in London on 16 May 1888 and closed on 23 June having played around 34 performances. Produced and directed by Barrington with Yorke Stephens, who played the title role, the piece also featured Amy McNeill as Marita (sic) Paoli.

The book was adapted into a play and debuted at the Broadway Theatre in New York on October 15, 1888. The cast included John H. Gilmour as Mr. Barnes and Emily Rigl as Marina Paoli. The review of the play in the New York Times was quite negative:

If anything could save a hopeless play it would be such delightful acting as Miss Emily Rigl did at the Broadway Theatre last evening; but nothing human could redeem such a dramatic monstrosity as Archibald Clavering Gunter's play called "Mr. Barnes of New-York." People who read the novel fondly fancied that there could be nothing worse than that; but they had not measured the possibilities of the stage.

The Times noted that the "audience was suspiciously ecstatic in its enthusiasm." And the review in Life said: "The play does not imperil Shakespeare's laurels, but it is thoroughly interesting and amusing." The play ran for seven weeks at the Broadway Theatre, closing on December 1, and saw performances far and wide over following years.

== Films ==
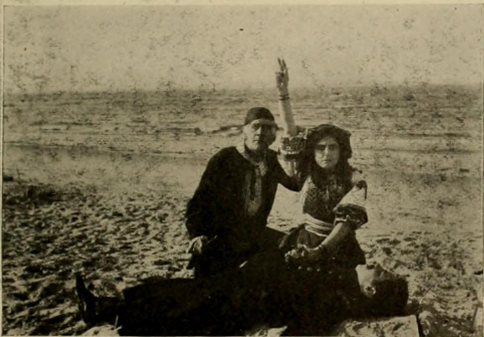
Scene from 1914 silent film

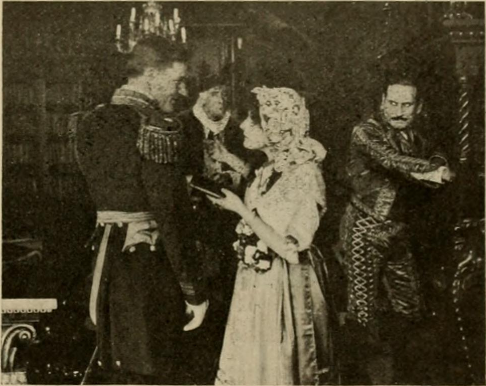
Scene from 1914 silent film

The work was adapted to silent film twice, in 1914 and 1922. The 1914 version by Vitagraph Studios starred Maurice Costello as Mr. Barnes and Mary Charleson as Marina. The 1922 version featured Tom Moore, Anna Lehr, and Naomi Childers, and was directed by Victor Schertzinger.
