= Mr. Barnes of New York (1922 film) =

1922 film by Victor Schertzinger

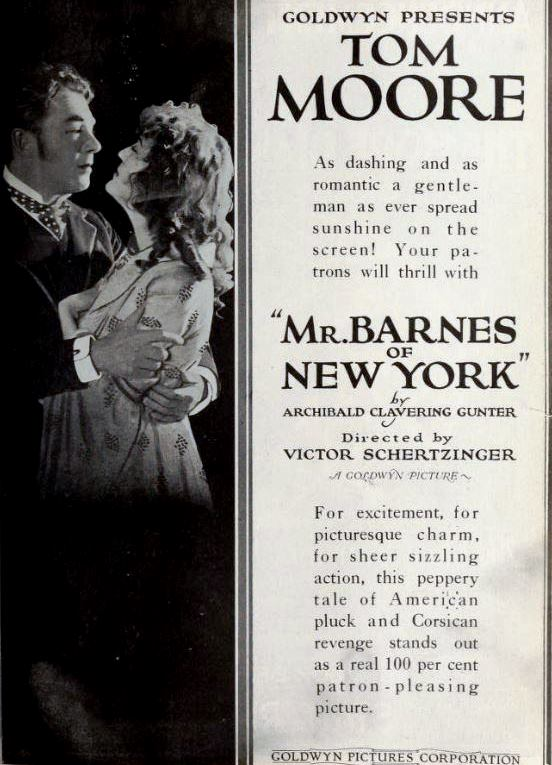
- Advertisement
- Directed by: Victor Schertzinger
- Written by: Gerald Duffy; J.E. Nash
- Based on: Mr. Barnes of New York by Archibald Clavering Gunter
- Produced by: Samuel Goldwyn
- Starring: Tom Moore; Anna Lehr; Naomi Childers
- Cinematography: George Brewster; Max Fabian
- Production company: Goldwyn Pictures Corporation
- Distributed by: Goldwyn Pictures Corporation
- Release date: May 22, 1922
- Running time: 50 minutes
- Country: United States
- Language: Silent (English intertitles)

Mr. Barnes of New York is a 1922 American silent drama film directed by Victor Schertzinger and starring Tom Moore, Anna Lehr and Naomi Childers. It is an adaptation of the novel of the same name by Archibald Clavering Gunter, which had previously been turned into a 1914 film.

== Plot ==
As described in a film magazine, American traveler Mr. Barnes becomes involved in a Corsican feud when he unexpectedly witnesses a duel between a native and an English naval officer. The slain man's sister Marina Paoli vows vengeance. She hires an artist to paint a picture of the duel and has it hung in an art gallery in Paris, where detectives watch in an effort to discover the identity of the English officer. Barnes sees the painting and overhears a beautiful young English woman tell a friend that she has fallen in love with one of the men in the painting. The picture is his own, and he follows her as she goes to catch a train. Through the connivance of a porter on the train, he steers the young woman, Enid Anstruther into a friendly relationship with himself. By the time they reach Nice, Barnes is head over heels in love with Enid and suspects that it is her brother Gerard who is the naval officer implicated in the duel. Gerard is deeply in love with Marina, who refuses to marry him because of her vow. Her guardian Count Danella wants to marry her and conspires to have her marry Gerard and to then tell her that he is the man who killed her brother. The Count believes that this will force her to avenge her brother's killing, leaving Marina to marry him. Through the investigation of Barnes it turns out that Gerard had loaned his pistols to another officer and it was that man who shot Marina's brother. This leaves the way clear for Gerard and Marina and for Barnes and Enid to get married.

== Cast ==
- Tom Moore as Mr. Barnes
- Anna Lehr as Marina Paoli
- Naomi Childers as Enid Anstruther
- Louis Willoughby as Gerard Anstruther
- Ramon Novarro as Antonio
- Otto Hoffman as Tomasso
- Sidney Ainsworth as Count Danella

== Preservation ==
A print of Mr. Barnes of New York exists at the George Eastman Museum.

== Bibliography ==
- Allan R. Ellenberger. Ramon Novarro: A Biography of the Silent Film Idol, 1899-1968. McFarland, 1999.
