= The Big Bonanza (play) =

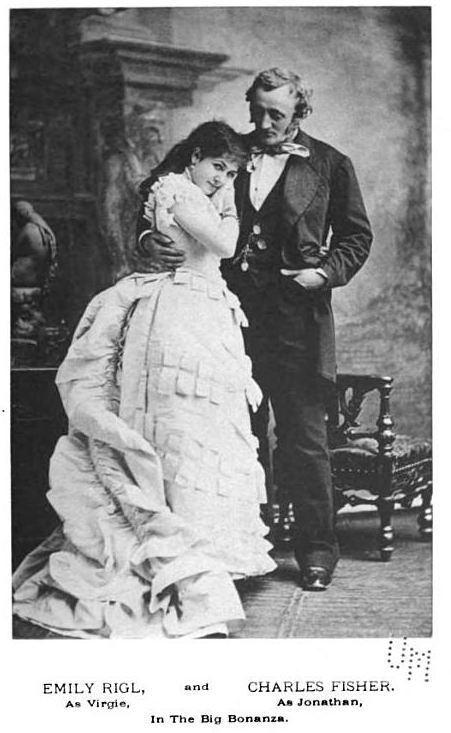
Emily Rigl and Charles Fisher in The Big Bonanza in 1875

The Big Bonanza: A Comedy of Our Time is a comedy in five acts by Augustin Daly. It is one of two plays by Americans adapted from Gustav von Moser's 1874 play Ultimo, Lustspiel in fünf Akten; the other being Bartley Campbell's Bulls and Bears (1875). A satire of Wall Street, it was first performed at Broadway's Fifth Avenue Theatre in New York City on February 17, 1875.

== Roles and original cast ==
- Lucretia Cawallader (Annie Graham)
- Eugenia Cadwallader (Fanny Davenport)
- Jonathan Cadwallader (Charles Fisher)
- Virgie (Emily Rigl)
- Agassiz (James Lewis)
- Bob Ruggles (John Drew Jr.)

== Plot ==
The stuffy and elitist Lucretia Cawallader is intent on seeing that her daughter, Eugenia, should be properly married to someone of sufficiently high position in society. She becomes irate when she learns that Eugenia was seen in public with an unknown disheveled-looking young man. Her husband, the Wall Street investor Jonathan Cadwallader, further adds to her distress by his incessant arguing with Lucretia's visiting cousin, Professor Agassiz. Jonathan makes a $30,000 wager with Agassiz betting that the professor, if given the opportunity to invest that money, could not successfully net a positive return in a month's time. Agassiz makes the attempt, and fails. However, it is revealed that the wager was not fair, as Jonathan's clerk had purposefully disobeyed Agassiz's instructions regarding how to invest the funds. The mysterious you man returns, and it is revealed he is Bob Ruggles, Jonathan's nephew. Reconciliation are made, and Bob and Eugenia are given the family's blessing to marry.
