= Barrymore family =

American acting family

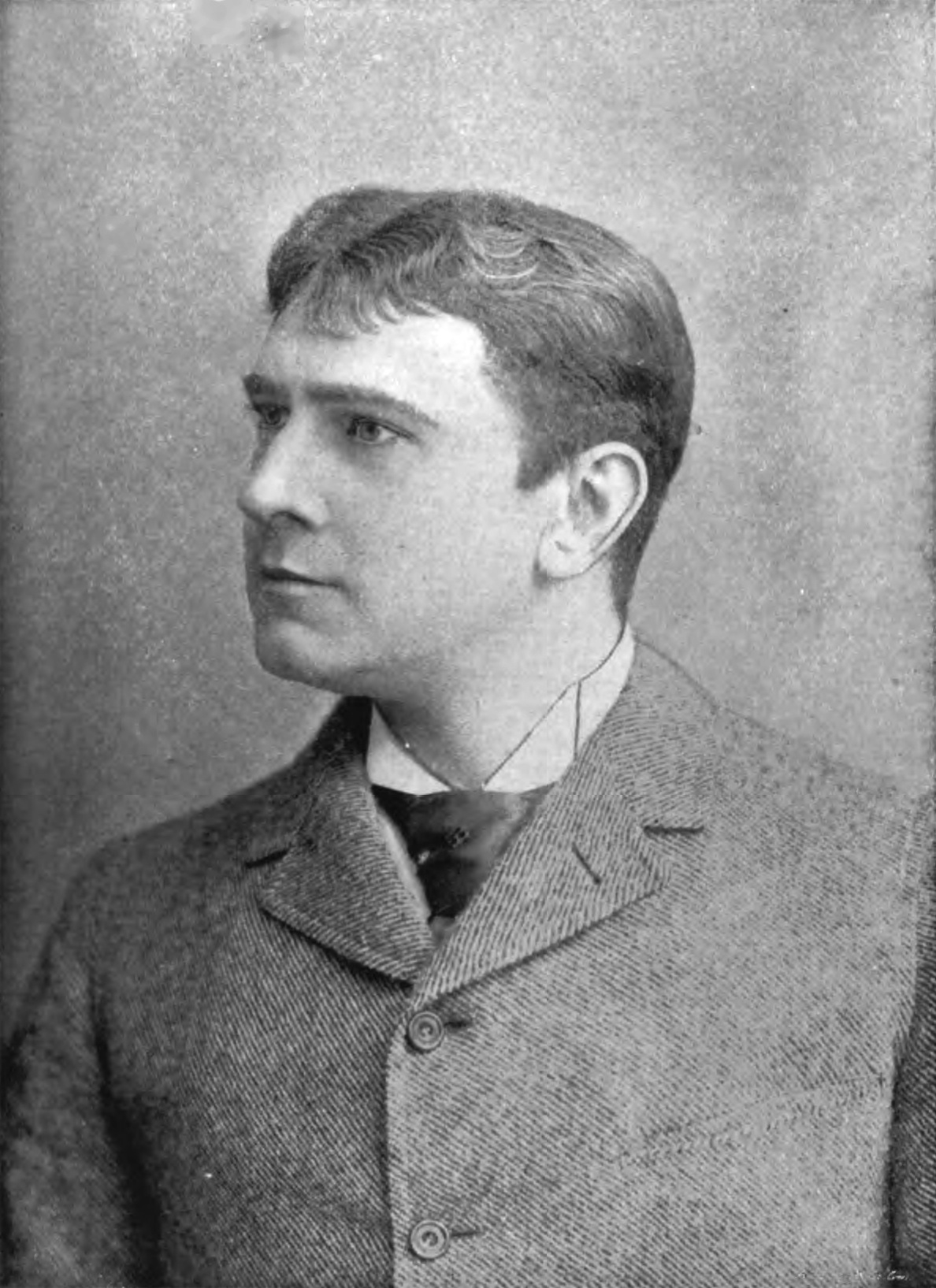
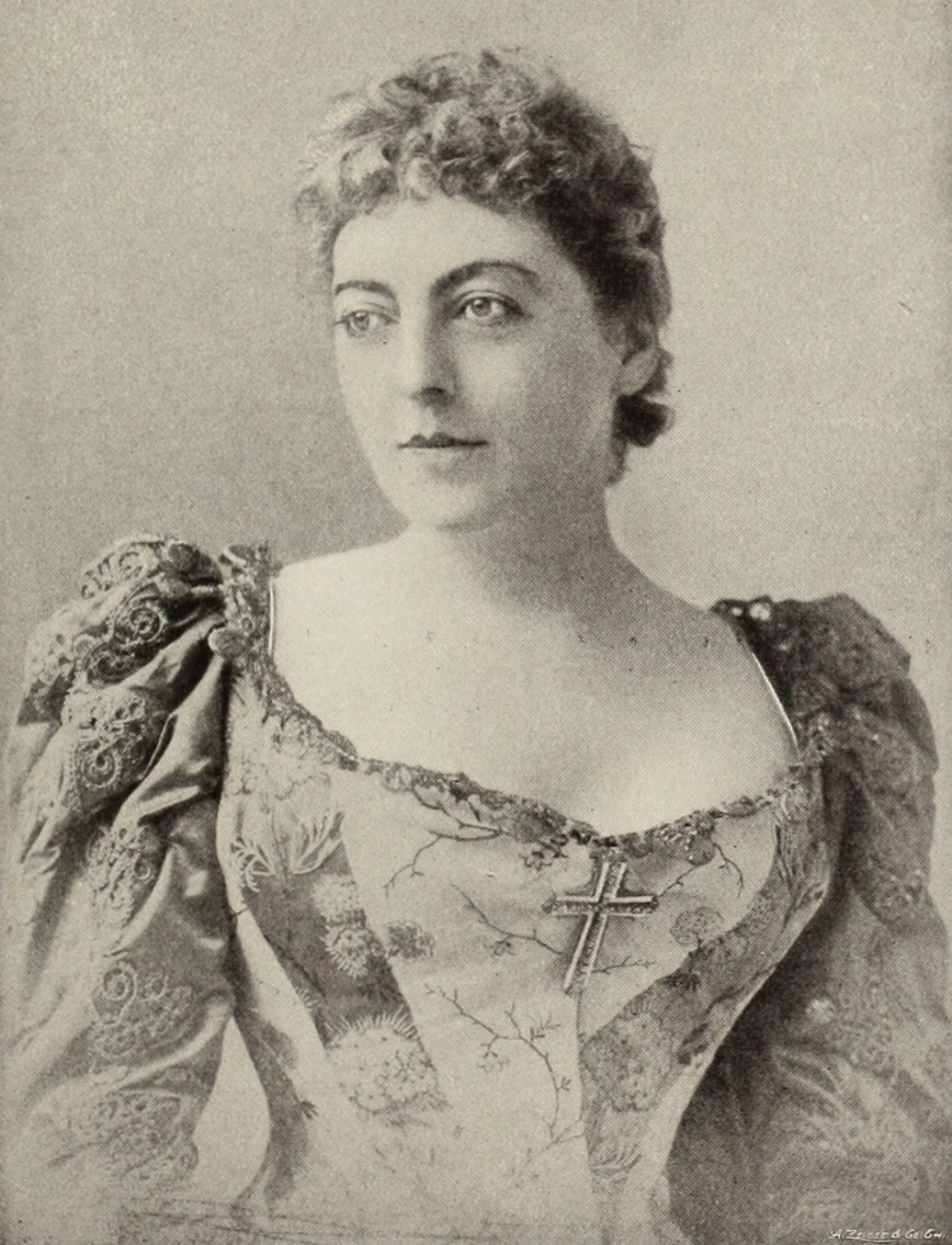
- Maurice Barrymore Georgiana Drew
- Current region: United States West Coast
- Origin: Philadelphia, Pennsylvania
- Connected families: Drew family Rankin family

The Barrymore family, and the related Drew family, form a British–American acting dynasty that traces its acting roots to the mid-19th-century London stage. After migrating across the Atlantic Ocean to the United States, members of the family subsequently appeared in motion pictures, beginning with the silent film period of the 1890s to 1929 and then into the modern era of sound film.

The surname Barrymore originated with an actor named William Barrymore (c. 1759–1830). The related Drew family traces back to the Irish actor John Drew Sr. (1827–1862).

== History ==
In the 1870s, John Drew Jr. had starred in a production of Hamlet, where he met 26 year old Oxford University graduate and English actor, Herbert Arthur Chamberlayne Blyth, more commonly known under his stage name, Maurice Barrymore. The two became friends and John Jr. brought Barrymore home to meet his family and sister Georgiana Drew. Georgiana and Barrymore began courting and would marry on December 31, 1876. Drew and Barrymore subsequently had three children (two boys and a daughter), all famous film, radio, television stars: Lionel, Ethel Mae, and John.

Drew decended from a established acting family, the Drews. Her mother, Louisa Lane Drew, was a prominent stage actress in the United States and managed the successful Arch Theatre in Philadelphia. Her father was John Drew, a successful Irish actor that passed when she was child. She also had two successful actor brothers, John Drew Jr. and Sidney Drew, who would have acting children of their own.

This would unite the two established theatrical families and contribute to a lineage that would dominate American stage acting for decades. This union is frequently cited by theatre historians as foundational to the emergence of the Barrymore acting dynasty in American cultural history.

== Notable members ==
=== First generation ===
William Edward Blythe (1818–1873)

- Married Maltida Chamberlayne (1822–1849)
  - Herbert Arthur Chamberlayne Blythe (1849-1905)

John Drew Sr. (1827-1862)

- Married Louisa Lane
  - Louisa Eliza Drew (1852-1889)
  - John Drew Jr. (1853-1927)
  - Georgiana Emma Drew (1856-1893)

=== Second generation ===
Maurice Barrymore (1849-1905)

- Married Georgiana Emma Drew (1856-1893)
  - Lionel Barrymore (1878–1954)
  - Ethel Barrymore (1879–1959)
  - John Barrymore (1882–1942)

=== Third generation ===
Lionel Barrymore (1878-1954)

- Married Doris Rankin (div.)
  - Mary Barrymore (died in infancy)
  - Ethel Barrymore II (died in infancy)
- Married Irene Fenwick

Ethel Barrymore (1879-1959)

- Married Russell Griswold Colt
  - Samuel Peabody Colt (1909-1986)
  - Ethel Barrymore Colt (1912-1975)
  - John Drew Colt (1913-1975)

John Barrymore (1882-1942)

- Married Katherine Corri Harris (div.)
- Married Blanche Oelrichs (div.)
  - Diana Blanche Barrymore (1921 - 1960)
- Married Delores Costello (div.)
  - Delores Ethel Mae Barrymore (born 1930)
  - John Drew Barrymore (1932-2004)
- Married Elaine Barrie (div.)

=== Fourth generation ===
Ethel Barrymore Colt (1912-1977)

- Married John Romeo Miglietta
  - John Drew Migliette (born 1946)

Diana Blanche Barrymore (1921-1960)

- Married Bramwell Fletcher (div.)
- Married John R. Howard (div.)
- Married Robert Wilcox

Delores Ethel Barrymore (born 1930)

- Married Thomas Alexander Fairbanks/Fuchs (div.)
  - Hillary Klaradru Fairbanks Bedell
  - Anthony John Barrymore Fairbanks
- Married Lewis Jospeh Bedell
  - Doré Lewis Bedell (born 1957)
  - Stephanie Bae Bedell (born 1966)

John Drew Barrymore (1932-2004)

- Married Cara Williams (div.)
  - John Blyth Barrymore (born 1954)
- Married Gabriella Palazzoli (div.)
  - Blythe Dorores Barrymore (born 1960)
- Married Nina Wayne (div.)
  - Jessica Barrymore (1966-2014)
- Married Ildiko Jaid (div.)
  - Drew Barrymore (born 1975)

=== Fifth generation ===
John Blyth Barrymore (born 1954)

- Married Jacqueline (div.)
- Married Rebecca Pogrow
  - Blyth Laine
  - Sabrina Brooke

Drew Barrymore (born 1975)

- Married Jeremy Thomas (div.)
- Married Tom Green (div.)
- Married Will Kopelman (div.)
  - Olive Barrymore Kopelman (born 2012)
  - Frankie Barrymore Kopelman (born 2014)

For the maternal Drew acting dynasty, see Drew family.

== Legacy ==
Designations

Pennsylvania Historical Marker
- Official name: Barrymores, The
- Type: City
- Criteria: Performers
- Designated: October 1, 1996
- Location: NW corner, N 6th & Arch Sts., Philadelphia; 39.95279°N 75.15013°W
- Marker text: "Three famous actors, Philadelphia-born, were the third generation of this 'Royal Family of the American Stage.' Lionel (1878–1954), Ethel (1879–1959), and John (1882–1942) performed on stage, screen, radio. Their grandparents, the Drews, managed the Arch Street Theatre here."
- Etymology: From the surname of actor William Barrymore

=== Monuments ===
- The Ethel Barrymore Theatre was opened in 1928, named for Ethel Barrymore. It is a Broadway theater at 243 West 47th Street in the Theater District of Midtown Manhattan in New York City, New York, U.S.
- A statue of Ethel as Ophelia stands on the I. Miller Building on Broadway and 46th Street in New York. It was originally commissioned in 1929 by then building owner Isreal Miller and designated as a landmark in 1999.
- A crater on the planet Venus is also named for Ethel.
- In February 2010, an intersection in Fort Lee, New Jersey, was renamed John Barrymore Way on what would have been the actor's 128th birthday. The intersection marked the spot of the former Buckheister's Hotel, where Barrymore had his 1900 stage debut in "A Man of the World".
- Sidney Rankin Drew has a monument dedicated to him in Central Park in New York City.

=== In media ===
- In 1927, the Barrymore family was parodied in The Royal Family in which a character based on John Barrymore was portrayed by Fredric March. The play was staged in London in 1934 as Theatre Royal, with Laurence Olivier in the Barrymore role, and adapted as a film in 1930, with March reprising his performance.
- The 1958 film Too Much, Too Soon is a biographical film about Diana Barrymore and based on her autobiography of the same name.
- In 1982, Lionel, John, and Ethel were issued commemorative stamps by the United States Postal Service for their contribution to media.
- The 1995 play Essee and Me and Tennessee was written about Tennessee Williams friendship with Diana Barrymore, authored by David Cuthbert.
- Barrymore, a two-person play by William Luce, premiered in 1996 and depicts John Barrymore shortly before his death in 1942. A film version was released in 2011, with Christopher Plummer taking the main role.
- In 2009, the David L. Wolper Center held a "The Barrymores: Hollywood's First Family" exhibition. The exhibit featured letters, photos, and other memorabilia from the Barrymores, Drews, Costellos, Lanes, Colts, and Blyths.

The family has been subject to a numer of documentarys and books as a result from of their fame, most noting them as the "Royal Family" of Hollywood. In 2014, the Howard Johnson Plaza Tampa Downtown was renamed to The Barrymore Hotel Tampa Riverwalk as a tribute to the hotel's focus on performing and visual arts.

In 1994, the Performing Arts League of Philadelphia established the The Barrymore Awards for Excellence in Theatre, an annual nationally-recognized award program. The program has continued to present dozens of awards yearly to productions in the Philadelphia area.

== Notable accolades and nominations ==
| Year | Family member | Award | Category | Work | Result | Ref. |
|---|---|---|---|---|---|---|
| 1925 | John Barrymore | Rudolph Valentino Medal | Best Performance | Beau Brummel | Won | |
| 1930 | Lionel Barrymore | Academy Awards | Best Director | Madame X | Nominated | |
| 1932 | Lionel Barrymore | Academy Awards | Best Actor | A Free Soul | Won | |
| 1945 | Ethel Barrymore | Academy Awards | Best Supporting Actress | None by the Lonely Heart | Won | |
| 1947 | Ethel Barrymore | Academy Awards | Best Supporting Actress | The Spiral Staircase| | Nominated | |
| 1948 | Ethel Barrymore | Academy Awards | Best Supporting Actress | The Paradine Case | Nominated | |
| 1950 | Ethel Barrymore | Academy Awards | Best Supporting Actress | Pinky | Nominated | |
| 1982 | Drew Barrymore | British Academy Film Awards | Most Outstanding Newcomer to Leading Film Roles | E.T. the Extra-Terrestrial | Nominated | |
| 1984 | Drew Barrymore | Golden Globes Awards | Best Supporting Actress – Motion Picture | Irreconcilable Differences | Nominated | |
| 1992 | Drew Barrymore | Golden Globes Awards | Best Actress in a Miniseries or Television Film | Guncrazy | Nominated | |
| 2000 | Drew Barrymore | Primetime Emmy Awards | Outstanding Animated Program (for Programming One Hour or More) | Olive, the Other Reindeer | Nominated | |
| 2009 | Drew Barrymore | Primetime Emmy Awards | Outstanding Lead Actress in a Miniseries or a Movie | Grey Gardens | Nominated | |
| 2009 | Drew Barrymore | Golden Globes Awards | Best Actress in a Miniseries or Television Film | Grey Gardens | Won | |
| 2009 | Drew Barrymore | Screen Actors Guild Awards | Outstanding Performance by a Female Actor in a Miniseries or Television Movie | Grey Gardens | Won | |
