= The Price of Fame (1916 film) =

1916 silent film

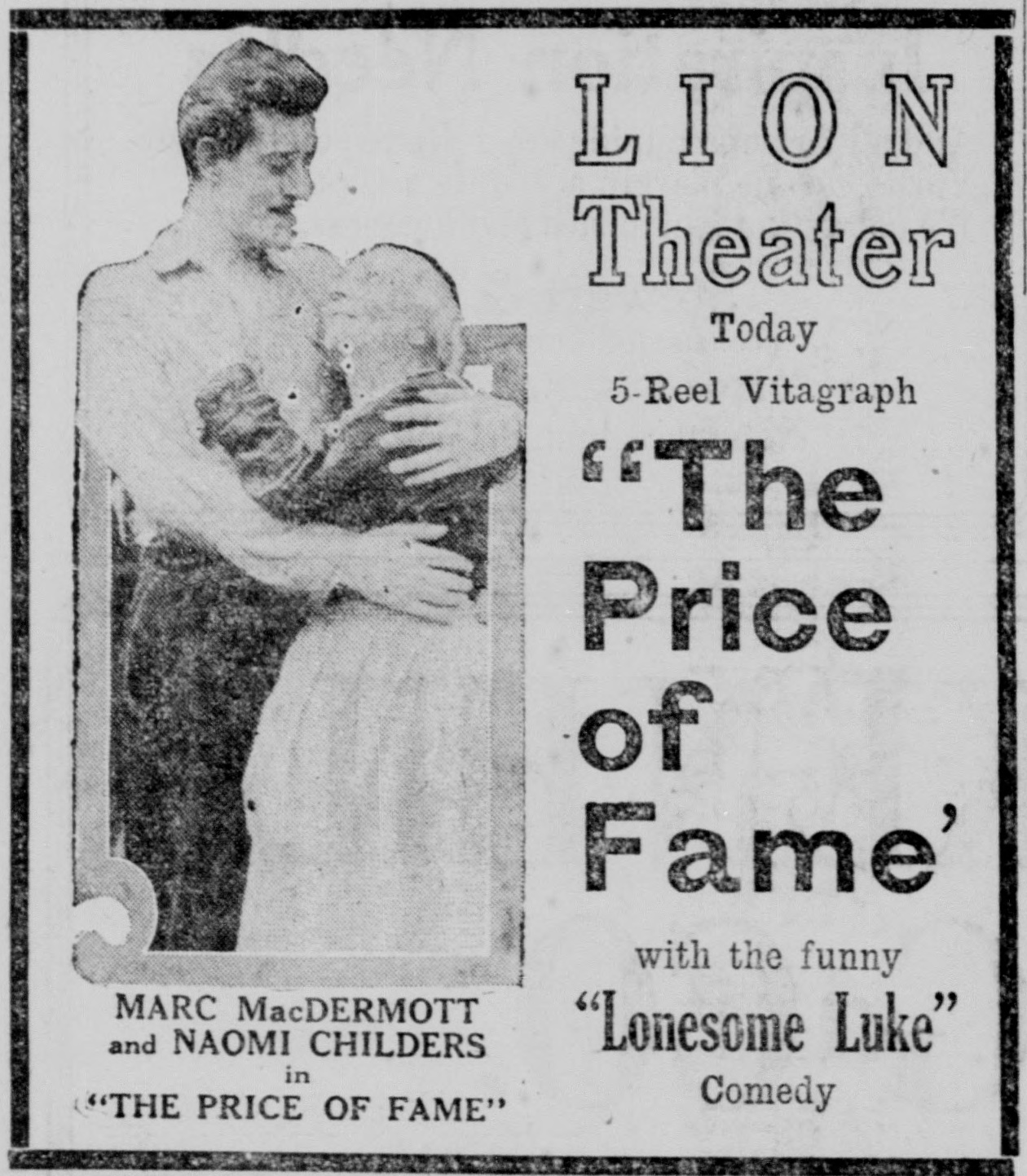
- Contemporary advertisement
- Directed by: Charles Brabin
- Written by: Charles Brabin; Franklin B. Coates
- Starring: Marc McDermott; Naomi Childers; L. Rogers Lytton
- Cinematography: Joseph Shelderfer
- Production company: Vitagraph Company of America
- Distributed by: Greater Vitagraph
- Release date: November 13, 1916
- Running time: 50 minutes
- Country: United States
- Languages: Silent; English intertitles

The Price of Fame is a 1916 American silent drama film directed by Charles Brabin and starring Marc McDermott, Naomi Childers and L. Rogers Lytton.

== Cast ==
- Marc McDermott as John Thatcher / William Thatcher
- Naomi Childers as Constance Preston
- L. Rogers Lytton as Metz
- Logan Paul as Mr. Thatcher
- Mary Maurice as Mrs. Thatcher
- Philip Quinn as Butler

== Bibliography ==
- Langman, Larry. Destination Hollywood: The Influence of Europeans on American Filmmaking. McFarland, 2000.
