= Ada Cavendish =

English actress

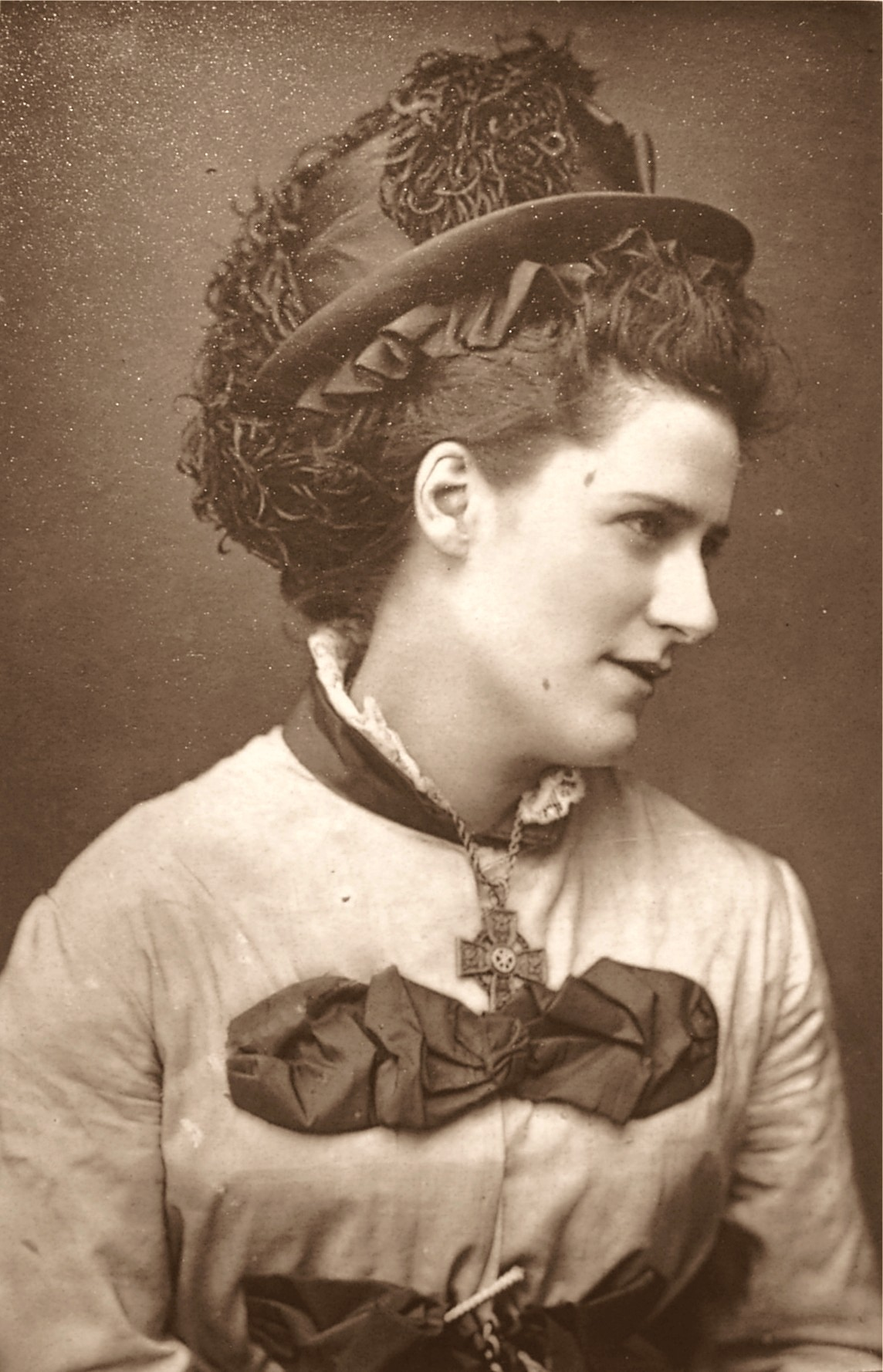
- Born: 1847; London
- Died: 5 October 1895; Thurloe Square, London
- Resting place: Kensal Green Cemetery
- Occupation: Actor
- Spouse: Francis Albert Marshall

Ada Cavendish (1847 – 5 October 1895) was an English actress known for her Shakespearean roles and for popularising the plays of Wilkie Collins in America.

== Life ==
After her stage debut in April 1863, Cavendish became known for playing such Shakespearean heroines as Juliet, Beatrice and Rosalind. She also famously played the title role of Miss Gwilt in the stage adaptation of Armadale and Mercy Merrick in The New Magdalen, both by Wilkie Collins.

== Performances ==
This list is derived from the ODNB unless otherwise noted.

- 1863 April – Played in All that glitters is not gold by Thomas Morton and John Maddison Morton at the Theatre Royal, Windsor.
- 1863 April – Played Aladdin in H J Byron's burlesque extravaganza Aladdin, or the wonderful scamp at the Theatre Royal, Windsor.
- 1863 August 31 – Made her first appearance in London at the New Royalty Theatre as Selina Squeers in a burletta called The Pirates of Putney.
- 1863 October – Played Venus in F C Burnand's Ixion; or, the man at the wheel. New Royalty Theatre
- 1863 December – Appeared in F C Burnand's Madame Berliot's ball; or, The chalet in the valley.
- 1863 December – Titania in the Christmas pantomime Sleeping Beauty at the Theatre Royal, Brighton.
- 1864 March – Princess Superba in F C Burnand's Rumpelstiltskin; or, the Woman at the Wheel.
- 1865 April – Played Hippodamia in F. C. Burnand's classical burlesque entitled Pirithous, the Son of Ixion.
- 1866 February – Acted for the first time at the Haymarket Theatre in a comedietta entitled A Romantic Attachment.
- 1869 January – Played Mrs Pinchbeck in the first performance of T. W. Robertson's comedy of Home – an adaptation of l’Aventurière at the Haymarket.
- 1870 April – Appeared in the comedy, by Andrew Halliday, entitled For Love or Money.
- 1870 October – Played the Marchesa San Pietro, in a revival of Palgrave Simpson’s romantic drama Marco Spada at the Globe Theatre.
- 1871 September – Played the title role in a revival at the Gaiety Theatre of Westland Marston’s drama of Donna Diana.
- 1872 March - Played Julia, in The Hunchback, at the Gaiety Theatre and, shortly afterwards, at the Court Theatre she appeared as Estelle, in the first performance of Westland Marston and W. G. Wills's play Broken Spells.

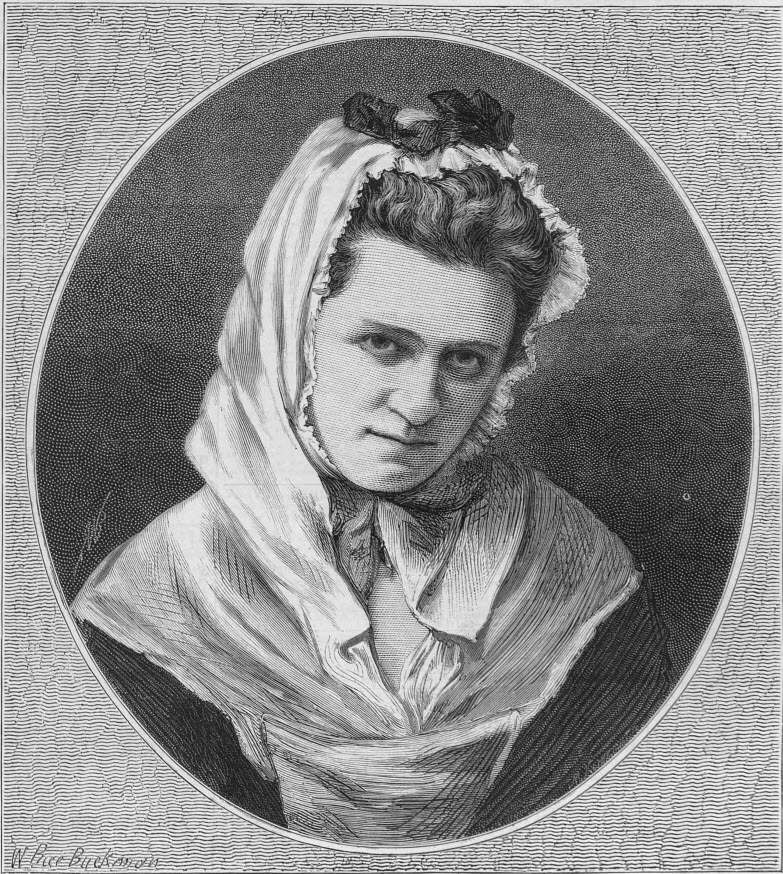
Ada Cavendish playing the title role in Tom Taylor’s Lady Clancarty

- 1873 May – At the Olympic Theatre she played the leading part, that of Mercy Merrick, Wilkie Collins’s New Magdalen.
- 1873 September – Played Juliet in Shakespeare’s play at the Olympic, on the occasion of her benefit.
- 1874 March – Appeared as Lady Teazle in School for Scandal at the Gaiety in London.
- 1874 March – Performed the part of the heroine in Tom Taylor’s Lady Clancarty; or, Wedded and Wooed, at the Gaiety.
- 1875 April – Played Beatrice, in a revival of Much Ado About Nothing.
- 1876 Easter – Played the title role in the first performance in London of Wilkie Collins’s Miss Gwilt.
- 1877 January – Played the heroine in the first performance of the comedy-drama The Queen of Connaught, by Robert Buchanan and Harriett Jay, at the Olympic.
- 1878 May – Took part in an entertainment in aid of the Vicarage Fund of St Michael and All Saints, North Kensington. She recited "The Spanish Mother".
- 1878 September – Made her début at the Broadway Theatre, New York, as Mercy Merrick, in The New Magdalen.
- 1879-1881 – Made a “starring” tour through the US, visiting, amongst other cities, San Francisco, Chicago, and St. Louis. She returned to England in 1881.
- 1882 January – Played in Tom Taylor's drama Plot and Passion at the Theatre Royal, Haymarket.
- 1882 April – Played Lady Spanker in London Assurance, by Dion Boucicault and John Brougham, at the Vaudeville. "Miss Cavendish plays with genuine vivacity, looks handsome and winning, and is altogether the best exponent of the character seen on the London stage in recent years".
- 1882 May – Played Clara Douglas in Edward Bulwer-Lytton's comedy Money at the Vaudeville.
- 1882 June – Performed in E H Brooke's benefit at the Adelphi Theatre. "Miss Ada Cavendish once more enthralled her audience with Tennyson's Charge of the Light Brigade”.
- 1882 September – Appeared, over six nights, in Romeo and Juliet, Much Ado about Nothing, The Lady of Lyons, London Assurance and The School for Scandal at the Theatre Royal, Birmingham.
- 1882 September – Appeared as Pauline in Edward Bulwer-Lytton's romantic melodrama The Lady of Lyons at the Londesborough Theatre, Scarborough, and on the following day as Beatrice in Much Ado about Nothing.
- 1883 February – Played Mrs Honeyton in Spenser They're-Smith's one-act comedietta A Happy Pair at the Gaiety.
- 1883 March – Gave four recitations at the Royal Concert Hall, St Leonards.
- 1883 April – Played in Buchanan's Lady Clare at The Globe.
- 1883 June – Played Marie in Charles Selby's two-act melodrama Robert Macaire, alongside Ellen Terry, at the Lyceum; in aid of the Royal College of Music, in the presence of the Prince and Princess of Wales.
- 1883 October – Played Camille in Dumas' Camille at the Theatre Royal, Birmingham.
- 1883 November – Played in Broken Bones, a new five-act play written for her by A C Calmour; at Mrs Chart's Theatre. Brighton.
- 1884 May – Performed in Dion Boucicault's "Devotion" at the Royal Court Theatre.
- 1884 September – Appeared in Mark Quinton's drama In His Power at the Alexandra Theatre, Liverpool.
- 1884 October – Performed in Who Speaks First at the Theatre Royal, Newcastle.
- 1884 October–December – Severe Illness. It was reported that "Miss Ada Cavendish was taken seriously ill at Brighton on Wednesday night [29 October], and is now in a very critical condition." This was followed the news that "The Illness of Miss Ada Cavendish has assumed a more serious phase. A prolonged delirious condition has so weakened her that the medical attendants express great anxiety as to the result", and then “that her progress towards convalescence is extremely slow”, but by early December she was “considered quite out of danger”. On the 18th the news was yet better: “It is with great pleasure we notice that this talented lady has sufficiently recovered from her recent severe illness to journey back - on Wednesday last - to her home in London”.
- 1885 January – Appeared in Mark Quinton's drama In His Power at the Olympic Theatre.
- 1885 May – After her prolonged illness, performed agan in The New Magdalen at the National Standard Theatre, Bishopsgate.
- 1886 November – Performed in Horace Sedger's Hidden Worth at the Prince of Wales's theatre, to poor reviews.
- 1890 May – The last original part in which she appeared in London was that of Aphrodite, in Buchanan's Bride of Love, at the Adelphi, and then at the Lyric on 9 June.

The ODNB noted that:

During her stage career Ada Cavendish was variously described as a sprightly, fair-haired burlesque actress with good gifts in comedy and serious drama, especially Shakespeare; dignified and refined, she earned many laudatory notices.

The York Herald went further:

No actress but Miss Terry or Mrs Bancroft is more popular in London than Miss Cavendish who, if some one could provide her with a powerful play, might increase her reputation.

== Family ==
She married the playwright Francis Albert Marshall at St Edward's Roman Catholic Church, Windsor on 2 May 1885, only 10 weeks after his first wife (Imogene Fitzinman Batty) had died. They had no children but Frank, as he was known, was father to a son and a daughter by his previous marriage. He died 8 Bloomsbury Square, London on 28 December 1889.

Ada Cavendish died on 5 October 1895 at her home in Thurloe Square. She was buried at Kensal Green Cemetery, London. In her will she stated her desire "that the jewels found on her body should be buried with her, and she instructed the executor of her will to pay £10 to a doctor to open one of her veins as she was afraid of being buried alive".

== Notes ==
- Peters, Catherine. The King of Inventors, A Life of Wilkie Collins, Seeker & Warburg, London 1991
