= Blind Man's Eyes =

1919 silent film directed by John Ince

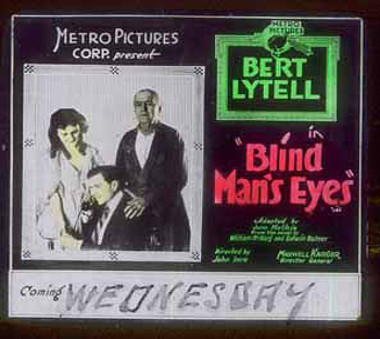
- Lantern slide
- Directed by: John Ince
- Written by: June Mathis
- Based on: the novel, The Blind Man's Eyes by: William Briggs MacHarg; Edwin Balmer
- Produced by: Maxwell Karger
- Starring: Bert Lytell; Frank Currier; Naomi Childers
- Cinematography: Robert B. Kurrle
- Production company: Metro Pictures
- Release date: March 10, 1919 (US)
- Running time: 5 reels
- Country: United States
- Language: English

Blind Man's Eyes is a 1919 American silent drama film directed by John Ince and starring Bert Lytell, Frank Currier, and Naomi Childers, based on the 1916 novel The Blind Man's Eyes by Edwin Balmer and William MacHarg. It was released on March 10, 1919.

== Plot ==
Hugh Overton has been falsely convicted of the murder of Matthew Latrone and sent to prison. In order to clear his name, he escapes and heads back to the scene of the crime, traveling under the name of Philip Eaton. While on the train he runs into Basil Santoine, a blind attorney who he knows has the evidence to prove his innocence. Latrone has also learned of Overton's trip and has sent his henchman, Donald Avery, to dispose of Eaton. Unfortunately, Avery mistakes Santoine for Eaton and attempts to kill him, but simply leaves him unconscious.

When he awakes, Santoine suspects Eaton, due to his voice, who he had heard earlier in the evening, and which he remembered as he was one of the witnesses at Overton's trial. Santoine invite him back to his home, in order to figure out what his role is in everything. While under Santoine's roof, Eaton/Overton falls in love with Harriet, Basil's daughter, who refers to her as his "eyes", hence she is the "blind man's eyes".

Overton knows that Santoine has evidence in his safe which will prove his innocence. Latrone, who everyone thinks is dead, also knows this. Both men attempt to break into Santoine's safe on the same night. Overton and Latrone struggle, but Latrone is shot and killed by Avery, who had come as backup to his employer. The evidence comes to light, and Overton is declared innocent, after which he and Harriet become a couple.

== Cast ==
- Bert Lytell as Hugh Overton, aka Philip D. Eaton
- Frank Currier as Basil Santoine
- Naomi Childers as Harriet Santoine
- Joseph Kilgour as Matthew Latrone
- Richard Morris as Gabriel Warden
- Morris Foster as Donald Avery
- Gertrude Claire as Mrs. Overton
- Mignon Anderson as Edith Overton
- Effie Conley

== Production ==
Production on the film began on January 6, 1919, as soon as Bert Lytell had returned from a stint in training for the U.S. Army. The first scenes of the picture were filmed at a newly constructed courtroom set on the Metro lot. It was revealed in mid-January that William Ince would direct the film, and Naomi Childers would be the female lead opposite Lytell. It was reported that by January 25 the film was approximately half-way completed. Some of the interiors had been filmed in a Pullman car located on the Metro lot. The Pullman car was specially built on the Metro lot, in their new large studio, and was built to standard Pullman specifications.

Later Metro chartered a special train which traveled over 110 miles outside Los Angeles, the train consisted of an engine, a Pullman, and an obvservation car. Several scenes were shot inside the train, but many exterior shots were also filmed. In early February it was reported that other actors attached to the project included Joseph Kilgour, Frank Currier, Richard Morris, Morris Foster, Gertrude Claire, and Mignon Anderson. By the end of April, filming on the picture was almost completed, and a release date of March 10 was announced. The production was completed by March 1.

== Reception ==
Exhibitors Herald gave the picture a positive review. They felt that the film had a unique twist in its plot, and the only downside they saw to the film was the unrelenting suspense. They felt the cast as a whole did a good job, and highlighted the performances of Lytell, Currier, and Childers. Moving Picture World also gave the film a positive review, calling it a "strong mystery story", and calling Bert Lytell's performance "excellent". They also applauded Ince's direction, as well as Childer's performance. Picture-Play Magazine gave Lytell's performance high marks, saying that his characterization "is appealing from the very outset and which grows more appealing with each successive scene.
