= Emily Rigl =

American actress

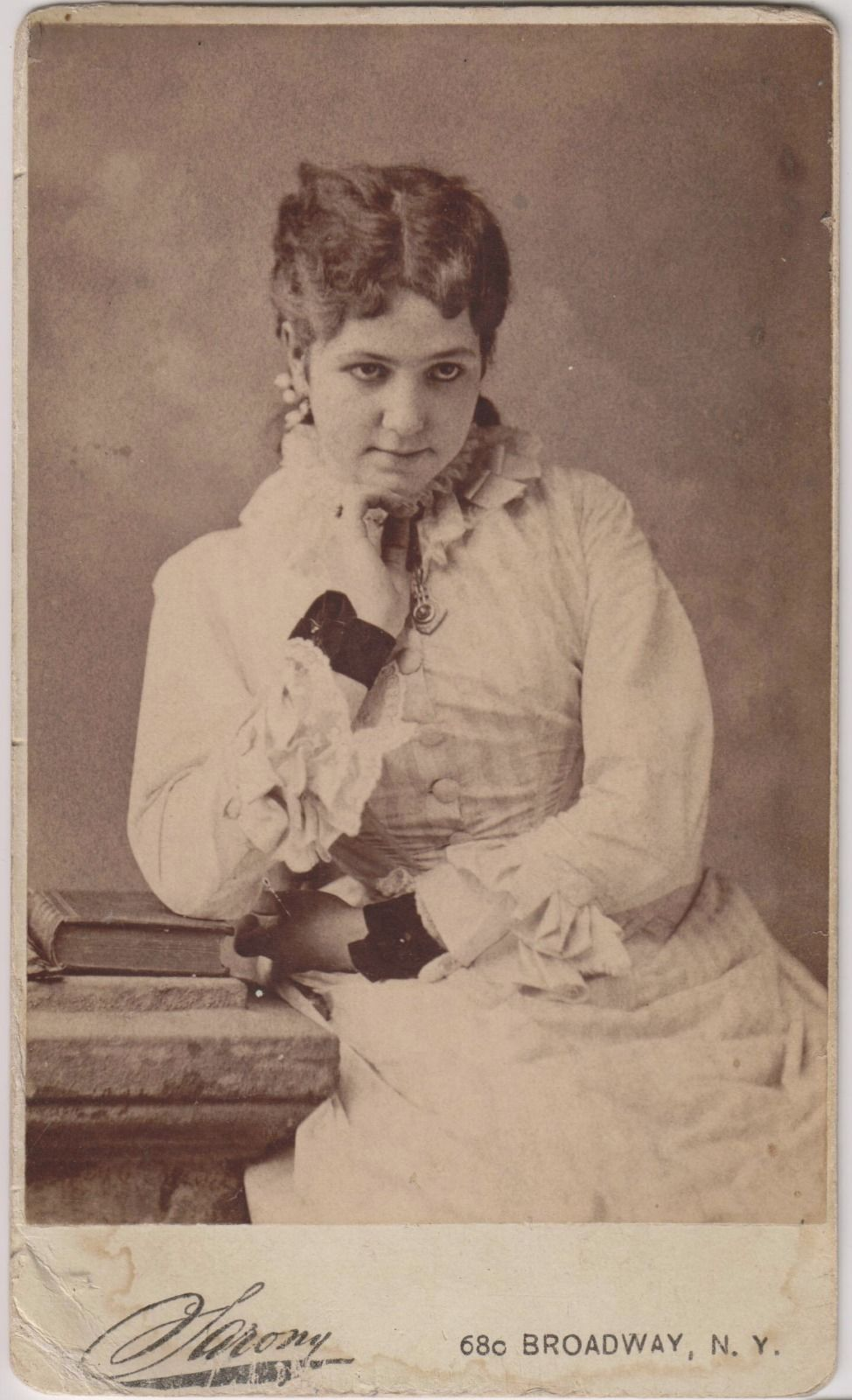
- Rigl in undated photo by Napoleon Sarony
- Born: Netherlands or Austria
- Occupation: Actress

Emily Rigl (1854; Austria - August 30, 1930; New York ]) was a 19th-century stage actress who primarily performed in the United States. Although not a major star, she was considered to be a talented actress.

== Biography ==
Rigl was born in the Netherlands or Austria (sources vary on this point) and trained as a ballet dancer, as her father was an instructor in that subject.

She came with her sister Betty to the United States in 1866, where she debuted in the chorus of The Black Crook at Niblo's Garden, in which Betty had a prominent role. Emily left that long-running show after two years, studied acting, and joined Augustin Daly's company by 1874 as an actress. She was active on the stage in numerous roles on Broadway and in traveling companies at least through 1907. According to The Oxford Companion to American Theatre, although "never a major star, she was still considered one of the best actresses of her day."

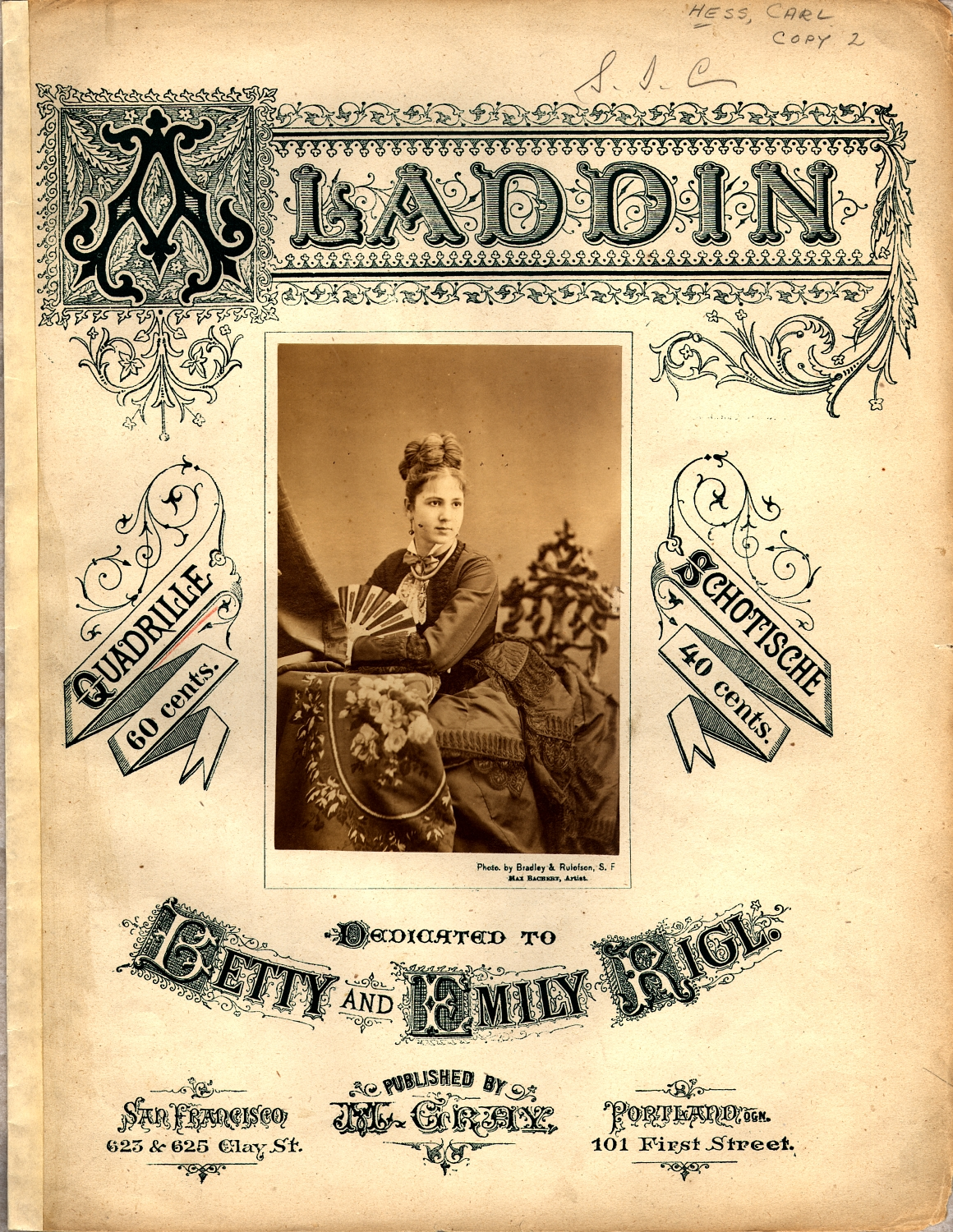
Aladdin Quadrille, 1873

Her roles included performances in Humpty Dumpty (1868), What Should She Do? (1874, for Daly), The Big Bonanza (1875), Saratoga (1875), Pique (1875, with Maurice Barrymore), The Galley Slave (1879), Mr. Barnes of New York (1888), Devil's Island (1898), Uncle Tom's Cabin (1901 production), and The Spell (1907).

She starred in a number of productions with Harry Lacy.

As a prominent actress of her day, the press would report on any "scandals" that occurred concerning Rigl. When starring with Joseph Haworth in The Crust of Society, she announced on stage that he had "made her life unbearable and I will not stand it any longer." They may have had an affair before that point, but in any event, that was the last performance of the play.

== Family ==
Her sister Betty's acting career was much shorter, she retired from the stage after marrying Philadelphia merchant William Whitney.
