= Francis Albert Marshall =

19th-century British playwright

Francis Albert Marshall (November 1840 in London – 28 December 1889 in London) was a British playwright.

== Life ==
He was the fifth son of William Marshall (1796–1872) of Patterdale Hall and Hallstead, Westmoreland. The father was M.P. for Beverley (1831–2), Carlisle (1835–47) and East Cumberland (1847–65) and married, 17 June 1828, Georgiana Christiana, seventh daughter of George Hibbert of Munden, Hertfordshire.

Francis was educated at Harrow, and matriculated from Exeter College, Oxford, on 14 June 1859, but did not take a degree. For several years, he was a clerk in the audit office at Somerset House, but soon began contributing to newspapers and periodicals, and in 1868 resigned his appointment. He had already made some reputation as a playwright, and soon afterwards became a dramatic critic to the London Figaro.

With W. G. Wills he produced Cora, a drama in three acts, Globe Theatre, 28 February 1877. For his friend Henry Irving he wrote two pieces: a drama in four acts, founded on the history of Robert Emmet, and a version of Werner, altered and adapted for the stage. The latter was produced at the Lyceum Theatre on the occasion of the benefit given to Westland Marston by Henry Irving on 1 June 1887. Marshall's Robert Emmet has not been put on the stage. During his last years he edited, with the assistance of many competent scholars, a new edition of the works of Shakespeare, called The Henry Irving Edition. (Sir) Henry Irving contributed an introduction. Marshall was a genial companion, and collected a valuable library.

He died, after some years of declining health, at 8 Bloomsbury Square, London, 28 December 1889.

His first wife died on 19 February 1885; he married his second wife, actress Ada Cavendish, on 2 May 1885.

== Plays ==
1. Mad as a Hatter, a farce produced at the Royalty Theatre, 7 Dec. 1863.
2. Corrupt Practices, a drama in two acts, Lyceum Theatre, 22 Jan. 1870.
3. Q. E. D., or All a Mistake, a comedietta, Court Theatre, 25 Jan. 1871.
4. False Shame, a comedy in three acts, Globe Theatre, 4 Nov. 1872.
5. Brighton, a comedy in four acts, founded on Bronson Howard's Saratoga, Court Theatre, 25 May 1874.
6. Biohn, a romantic opera in five acts, with music by Lauro Rossi, Queen's Theatre, 17 Jan. 1877, in which his wife, Mrs. Fitzinman Marshall, appeared as Elfrida, and was a failure.
7. Family Honours, a comedy in three acts, Aquarium Theatre, 18 May 1878.
8. Lola, or the Belle of Baccarato, a comic opera, with music by Antonio Orsini, Olympic Theatre, 15 Jan. 1881.

== Printed works ==
1. A Study of Hamlet, 1875.
2. Henry Irving, Actor and Manager, by an Irvingite, 1883.
3. L. S. D., an unfinished novel, brought out in the Britannia Magazine.
