= Anne Hartley Gilbert =

British actress (1821–1904)

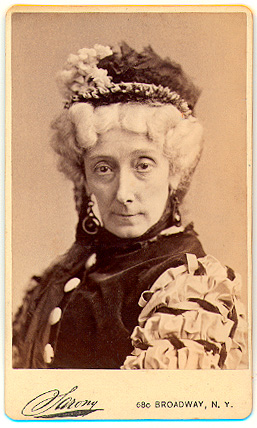
Mrs. Gilbert

Anne Hartley Gilbert (October 21, 1821 – December 2, 1904) professionally billed as Mrs G. H. Gilbert was a British stage actress and dancer.

She was born Anne Jane Hartley at Rochdale, Lancashire, England. At fifteen she was a pupil at the ballet school connected with Her Majesty's Theatre, in the Haymarket, conducted by Paul Taglioni, and became a dancer. Her first conspicuous appearance on stage was made as a dancer, in the Norwich theatrical circuit, England, in 1845. In 1846 she married George H. Gilbert (d. 1866), a performer in the theatre company of which she was a member. Together they filled many engagements in English theatres, moving to America in 1849.

Her first 15 years in America were spent in inland cities such as Chicago, Cleveland, and Cincinnati. Mrs Gilbert's first success in a speaking part was in 1857 as Wichavenda in John Brougham's Po-ca-hon-tas.

One of the most brilliant and decisive successes of her professional life was gained at the Broadway Theatre where, on 5 August 1867, Mr and Mrs W. J. Florence presented Thomas William Robertson's comedy Caste, for the first time in America. On leaving the Broadway she went to Daly's Fifth Avenue Theatre on Twenty-fourth Street with Robertson's comedy of Play. The cast included E. L. Davenport, George Holland, William Davidge, J. L. Polk, Agnes Ethel, and George Clarke. Mrs Gilbert played Mrs Kinpeck. For many years she played opposite James Lewis as his "wife", or playing old women's parts, in which she had no equal.

After Mr Daly's death in 1899 she came under Charles Frohman's management and later became a member of Annie Russell's company. On 24 October 1904, at the New Lyceum Theatre, Mrs Gilbert made her first appearance as a star, being then in the eighty-second year of her age, in a play, by Clyde Fitch, called Granny with a young Marie Doro in one of her earliest roles. Granny was announced as her farewell role and she read a special poem composed by Fitch at the end of each performance. Her final New York appearance occurred at the Lyceum on 12 November 1904. She acted for fifty-four years (after five years as a dancer), and she remained in active employment to the last. Mrs Gilbert was uniquely respected and popular, both with audiences and behind the footlights. She performed last on 1 December, three days after Granny opened in Chicago, and died there on the following day from a brain haemorrhage.

== Bibliography ==
- Brown, Thomas Allston, A History of the New York Stage from the Earliest Performances in 1732 to 1901, Vol. I, New York: Dodd Mead & Co., 1903.
- Brown, Thomas Allston, A History of the New York Stage from the Earliest Performances in 1732 to 1901, Vol. II, New York: Dodd Mead & Co., 1903.
- Gilbert, Anne Hartley, ed. by Charlotte M. Martin, The Stage Reminiscences of Mrs. Gilbert, New York: C. Scribner's Sons, 1901.
- Mantle, Burns, and Garrison P. Sherwood, eds., The Best Plays of 1899-1909, Philadelphia: The Blakiston Company, 1944.
- Winter, William (1913). The Wallet of Time. New York: Moffat, Yard and Company. pp. 198–214.
