= Courage (1921 film) =

1921 film

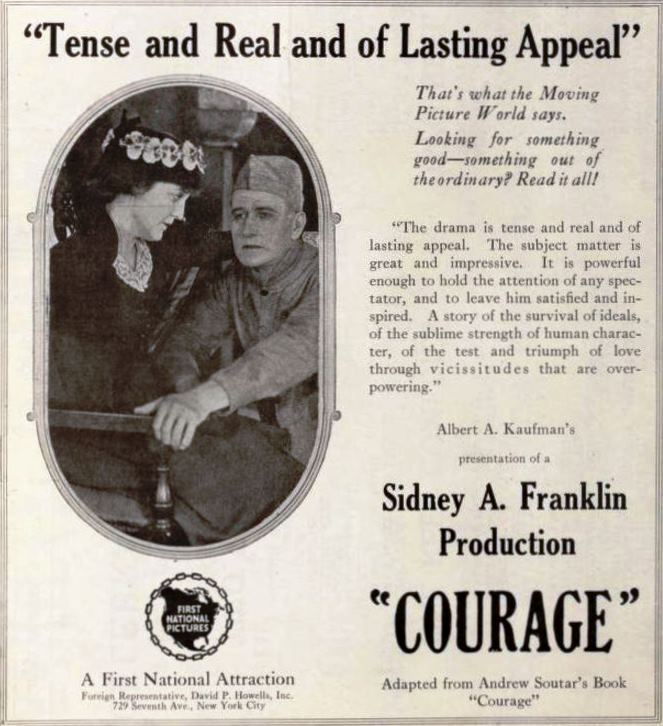
- Directed by: Sidney Franklin
- Written by: Sada Cowan; Andrew Soutar
- Produced by: Albert A. Kaufman
- Starring: Naomi Childers; Sam De Grasse; Adolphe Menjou
- Cinematography: David Abel
- Edited by: William Shea
- Production company: Sidney A. Franklin Productions
- Distributed by: Associated First National Pictures
- Release date: May 1921
- Running time: 60 minutes
- Country: United States
- Languages: Silent; English intertitles

Courage is a 1921 American silent drama film directed by Sidney Franklin and starring Naomi Childers, Sam De Grasse and Adolphe Menjou. It was distributed by First National Pictures.

The survival status of the film is unknown.

== Plot ==
In Scotland, a young inventor goes to visit a man who owes him some money only to find him murdered. He is arrested and imprisoned for the crime, while his wife faithfully continues to support him and perfect his invention. Eventually the real culprit is exposed and he is freed to return to her.

== Cast ==
- Naomi Childers as Jean Blackmoore
- Sam De Grasse as Stephan Blackmoore
- Lionel Belmore as Angus Ferguson
- Adolphe Menjou as Bruce Ferguson
- Lloyd Whitlock as 'Speedy' Chester
- Alec B. Francis as McIntyre
- Ray Howard as Stephan Blackmoore Jr
- Gloria Hope as Eve Hamish
- Charles Hill Mailes as Oliver Hamish

== Reception ==
"It's simple, yet humanly strong", wrote a review in Canadian Moving Picture Digest .

== Bibliography ==
- Munden, Kenneth White. The American Film Institute Catalog of Motion Pictures Produced in the United States, Part 1. University of California Press, 1997.
