= Maurice Barrymore =

British stage actor (1849–1905)

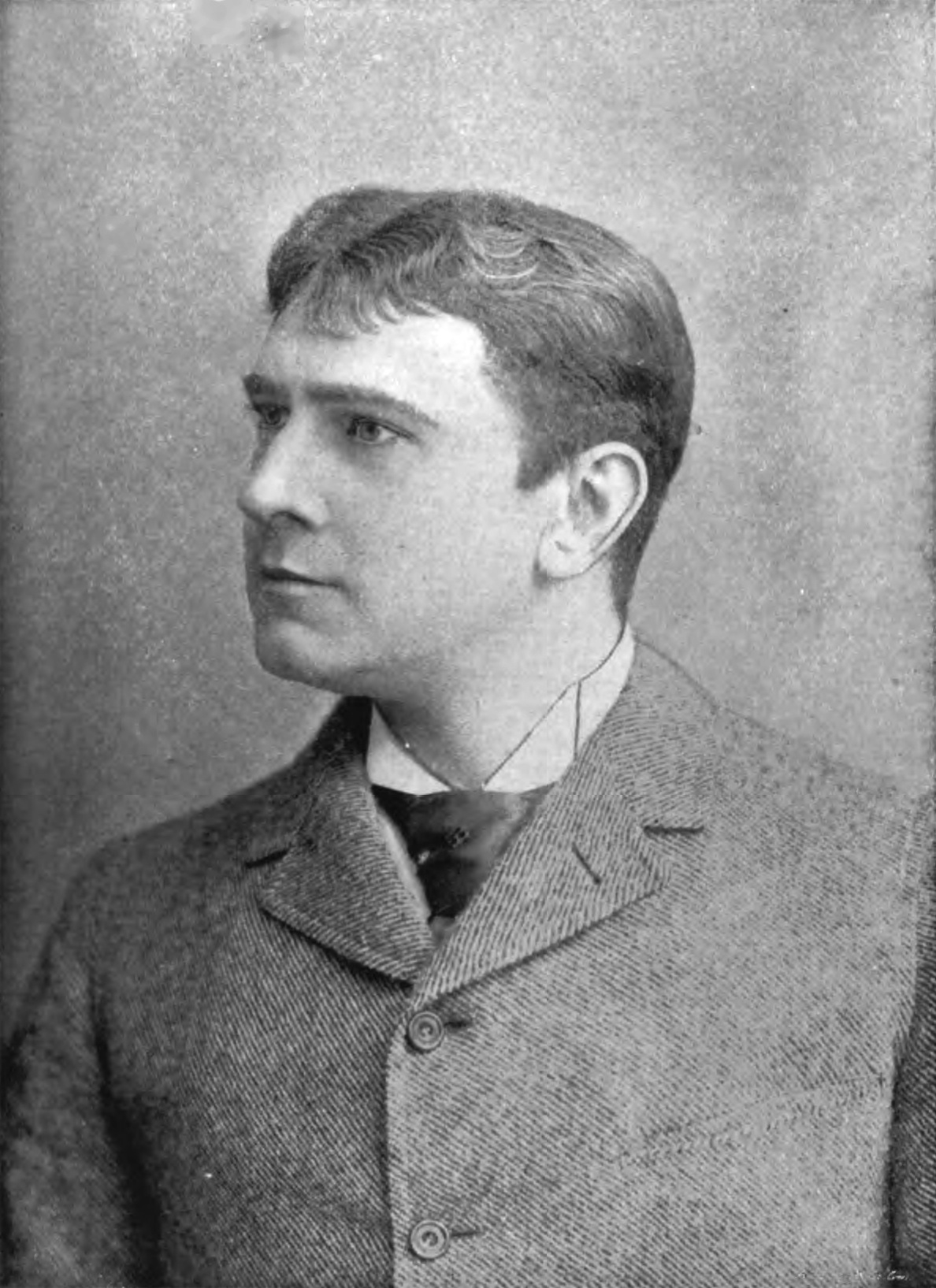
- Photo by W. M. Morrison
- Born: Herbert Arthur Chamberlayne Blyth; 21 September 1849; Amritsar, Punjab, India
- Died: 25 March 1905 (aged 55); Amityville, New York, U.S.
- Resting place: Mount Vernon Cemetery, Philadelphia, Pennsylvania
- Occupations: Actor, playwright
- Years active: 1874–1901
- Spouses: Georgiana Drew (m. 1876; died 1893) Mamie Floyd (m. 1894; div. 1900)
- Children: Lionel Barrymore; Ethel Barrymore; John Barrymore
- Family: Barrymore

early promotional being managed by J. M. Hill

Herbert Arthur Chamberlayne Blyth (21 September 1849 – 25 March 1905), known professionally by his stage name Maurice Barrymore, was an Indian-born British stage actor. He is the patriarch of the Barrymore acting family, and the father of John, Lionel, and Ethel.

== Early life ==
Born Herbert Arthur Chamberlayne Blyth in Amritsar, India, he was the son of William Edward Blythe, a surveyor for the British East India Company, and his wife Charlotte Matilda Chamberlayne de Tankerville. Herbert, the youngest of seven, had an older brother named Will and two sisters named Emily and Evelin. Three other siblings had died in infancy. Matilda, after a difficult pregnancy, died shortly after giving birth to Herbert on 21 September 1849. In his formative years Herbert was raised by his Aunt Amelia Blyth, his mother's sister, and later by other family members. Amelia, a Chamberlayne by birth, had married a brother of Herbert's father and was a Blyth by marriage.

Herbert was sent back to England for education at Harrow School, and studied law at Oxford University, where he was captain of his class football team in 1868. Herbert also became enamored of the sport of boxing. The Marquess of Queensberry Rules were firmly established at this time but it was not unusual to see bare knuckle fights. On 21 March 1872 Herbert won the middleweight boxing championship of England. Years later many of Herbert's friends would be sports figures of the day, particularly boxers and wrestlers such as William Muldoon, John L. Sullivan, James J. Corbett and a young actor named Hobart Bosworth, the latter of whom Herbert would stage in an amateur bout with his son Lionel.

Herbert's father expected him to become a barrister, but Herbert fell in with a group of actors, which scandalized the elder Blyth. That same year 1872 Herbert sat for his first posed theatrical photographic portrait by Oliver Sarony, older brother of the better remembered Napoleon Sarony. In order to spare his father the "shame" of having a son in such a "dissolute" vocation, he took the stage name Maurice Barrymore (he may or may not have legally changed from "Blyth"), inspired by a conversation he had with fellow actor Charles Vandenhoff about William Barrymore (1759–1830), an early 19th-century English thespian, after seeing a poster depicting Barrymore in the Haymarket Theatre. He wanted his first name to be pronounced in the French manner French: [mɔ'ʁis] instead of the English English: /ˈmɔɹɪs/. His friends avoided that altogether by simply calling him "Barry".

== Career and marriage to Georgiana Drew ==
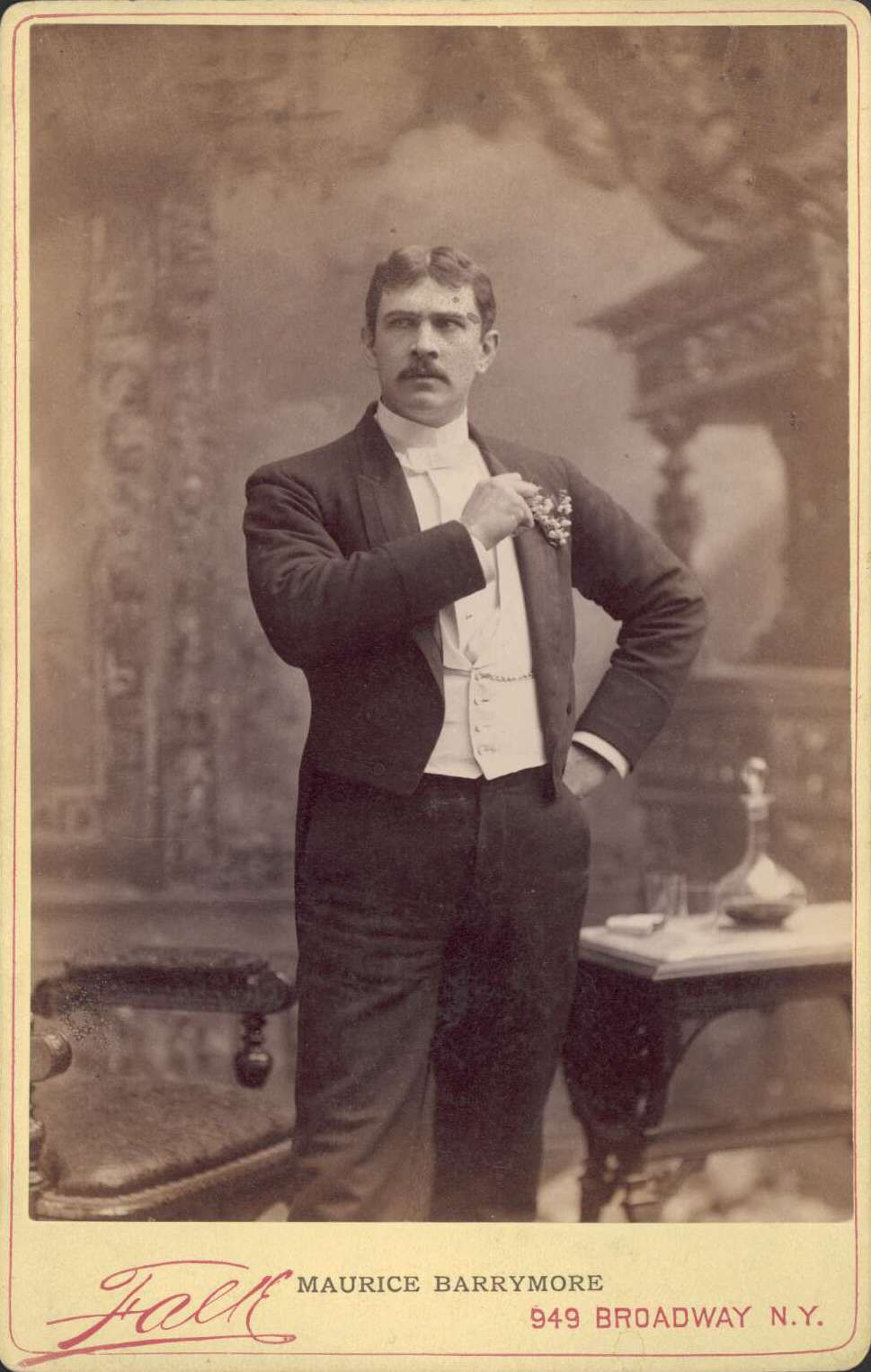
Maurice Barrymore as Wilding in Captain Swift (1888) by C. Haddon Chambers

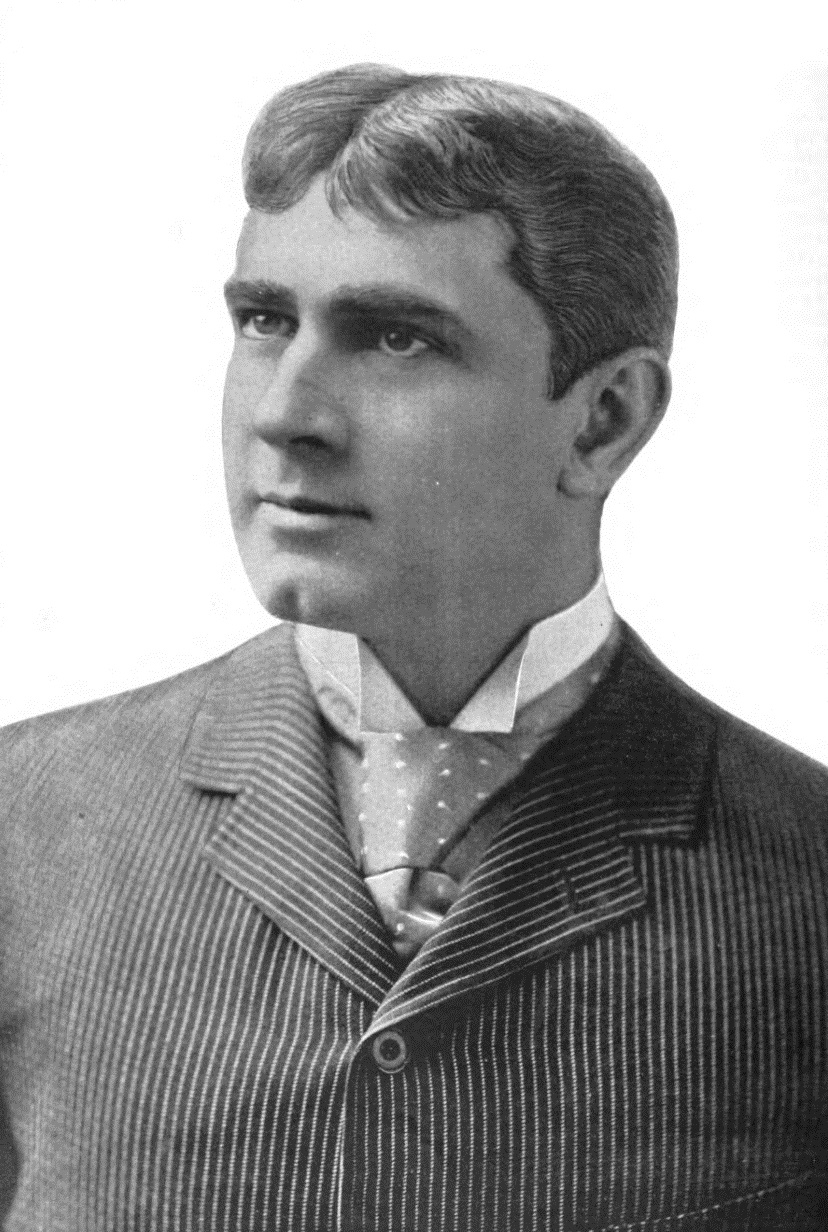
Maurice Barrymore mid 1890s.

On 29 December 1874, Barrymore emigrated to the United States, sailing aboard the SS America to Boston, and joined Augustin Daly's troupe, making his début in Under the Gaslight. He made his Broadway début in December 1875 in Pique opposite Emily Rigl; in the cast was a young actress, Georgiana Drew, known as Georgie. Maurice and Georgiana had been introduced earlier by her brother John Drew Jr. who had befriended Maurice when he first arrived in America. Drew Jr. and Georgiana later brought Barrymore home to Philadelphia to be introduced to her mother, the formidable Mrs. John Drew, who for some reason wasn't too enthralled by the young man.

After a brief courtship, Barrymore and Georgie married on 31 December 1876, and had three children: Lionel (born 1878), Ethel (born 1879), and John (born 1882). While their parents were on tour, the children lived with Georgiana's mother in Philadelphia. Barrymore had a lifelong love of animals and in the 1890s bought a farm on Staten Island to keep his collection of exotic animals. Georgiana died 2 July 1893, from consumption, leaving Maurice a widower with three teenage children. For a summer in 1896, Lionel and John were left on the farm in the care of the man who fed the animals. Exactly one year after Georgie's death Barrymore married Mamie Floyd, much to Ethel's consternation.

== Shooting ==
On 19 March 1879, in Marshall, Texas, Barrymore and fellow actor Ben Porter were shot by a notorious gunfighter and bully named Jim Currie. Barrymore and Porter had played cards earlier with Currie, winning some money from him. That evening, while Barrymore, Porter and the actress Ellen Cummins dined at the White House Saloon, an intoxicated Currie began insulting and goading them into a fight. Barrymore challenged Currie to a fistfight. Currie shot him in the chest and then shot Porter in the stomach. John Drew, Jr., also with the company, showed up at the doorway after being alerted by all the commotion but Currie didn't shoot him, possibly having run out of bullets. Porter was killed, while doctors spent the night operating on Barrymore to save his life. Georgie, then several months pregnant with Ethel, rushed to Texas to be at her husband's side enduring a long train trip. He made a full recovery, and returned to Marshall for the legal procedures that followed. Currie's brother was Andrew Currie, mayor of Shreveport, Louisiana, from 1878 to 1890 and later a member of the Louisiana state legislature, who apparently used his influence to secure a not guilty verdict (after a 10-minute deliberation). An enraged Barrymore vowed never to return to Texas.

According to a 2004 A&E Biography piece, after the Ben Porter tragedy, Barrymore asked Georgiana to tour with him and Helena Modjeska in a play he had written. Georgiana and the children had converted to Catholicism under Helena's influence. Learning that he and Helena had resumed their romance, Georgiana, who had been given ownership of the play by Barrymore, forced his hand by closing it. Helena's husband, its producer, sued her. The real reason for Georgiana's actions never got into the press. However, Barrymore's many dalliances did make the newspapers.

== Nadjezda ==
In 1884, Barrymore wrote a play titled Nadjezda (meaning "hope"). During this period he sailed with his wife Georgiana and their children Lionel, Ethel and John, then respectively 6, 5 and 2, to England to visit relatives he hadn't seen since migrating to America. (He had inherited some money from his aunt Amelia, one of his family members who helped raise him.) During the trip Barrymore met the great French actress and star Sarah Bernhardt. Without copyrighting his play, he gave her a copy of the manuscript. In 1886, Victorien Sardou, a friend of Bernhardt's, wrote his play La Tosca, which later achieved great fame as an opera. Barrymore claimed that Bernhardt had given his play to Sardou and that La Tosca plagiarized it, and sought an injunction to stop Fanny Davenport from putting on further performances. In affidavits read out in court Bernhardt said that she had never seen the play and knew nothing about it, and Sardou said that preliminary material for the play had been in his desk for fifteen years. In fact, the only resemblance to La Tosca is the unholy bargain the heroine makes to save her husband's life, similar to that of Tosca and Baron Scarpia. As Sardou pointed out in his affidavit, this plot device is a common one and had been notably used by Shakespeare in Measure for Measure.

== Last years ==
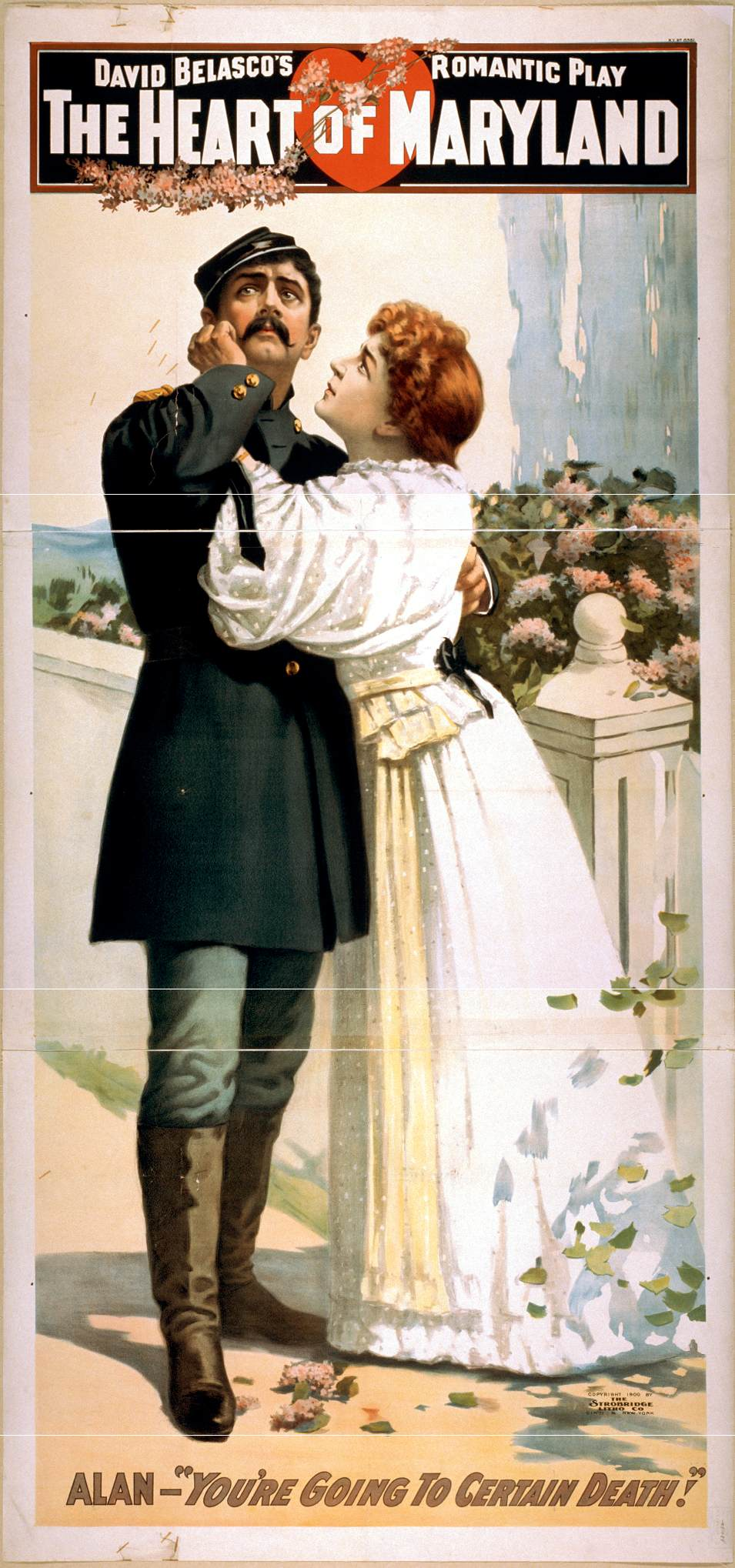
Lithograph of Barrymore with Mrs. Leslie Carter in The Heart of Maryland, 1895

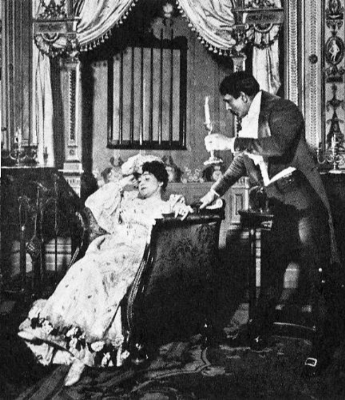
Becky Sharp 1899. With Mrs. Fiske.

In 1896, Barrymore became the first major Broadway star to headline in vaudeville—a brave foray at the time. During his career, Maurice Barrymore played opposite many of the reigning female stars of the time including Helena Modjeska, Mrs. Fiske, Mrs. Leslie Carter, Olga Nethersole, Lillian Russell, and Lily Langtry. In the 1895 theater season on Broadway he co-starred with Mrs. Leslie Carter in The Heart of Maryland. In the 1899 season on Broadway he had a success playing opposite Mrs. Fiske in the part of Rawdon Crawley in Becky Sharp. This play was based on a character from William Thackeray's novel Vanity Fair. Becky Sharp was Barrymore's last Broadway success. In 1900, Barrymore toured the U.S. with a play called The Battle of the Strong co-starring a young Holbrook Blinn. In the company of this play was a five-year-old child actress, Blanche Sweet, who grew up to be a silent movie actress and acted with Lionel in his first Biograph film. When the Battle of the Strong company stopped in Louisville, Kentucky Barrymore sat for his last posed photograph. Also during this time he got to spend time with his son John, who was now in his late teens; the two lived together at in Fort Lee, New Jersey. Lionel and Ethel were on the road in theater companies, having already started their careers.

== Mental breakdown and death ==
On 28 March 1901, Barrymore was performing at the Lion Palace Theatre in New York when he suddenly departed from his monologue and shocked the audience with what was described as "a blasphemous attack on the Jews" and a rant of "such an emotional pitch that tears rolled down his face." After further erratic behavior, Barrymore was committed to Bellevue Hospital by a court order obtained by his son John. In reporting his death on 25 March 1905, The New York Times recalled that "He was playing a vaudeville engagement [in 1901] at a Harlem theatre when he suddenly dropped his lines and began to rave." The following day, he became violent and was taken to Bellevue insane ward by his son, John, who lured him under the pretense of starring in a new play. At Bellevue and later Amityville, he was diagnosed with the lingering effects of syphilis, an incurable disease at the time. During his stay at Bellevue, he almost strangled his daughter Ethel during a visit. Ethel, through her early success on the stage, paid for her father's stay in the institutions. A trained boxer, Barrymore retained his strength; in a scuffle with one of the Bellevue attendants, he picked the man up over his head and threw him into a corner.

In 1905, Barrymore's son Lionel visited him at Amityville and the subject of San Francisco came up. Maurice called Lionel a "goddamned liar" and stated that San Francisco had been destroyed by fire and earthquake. Lionel writes in his autobiography that his father had foreseen the great 1906 earthquake a full year before it took place.

Barrymore died at Amityville in his sleep, and Ethel, after seeking permission from her uncle John Drew, had him buried in the family plot at Glenwood Cemetery in Philadelphia. When the cemetery later was closed, his remains were moved to Mount Vernon Cemetery, also in Philadelphia, where his first wife and her family are buried. Barrymore was fondly remembered, and his death was widely reported in the country's newspapers. He had lived long enough to see all three of his children enter the family business of acting.

== In memoriam ==
In honor of his life, Michael J. Farrand penned the memorial narrative poem "The Man Who Brought Royalty to America" in 2000, based on the definitive biography Great Times, Good Times: The Odyssey of Maurice Barrymore by James Kotsilibas Davis (Doubleday, 1977).
