= John Drew Jr. =

19th/20th-century American actor

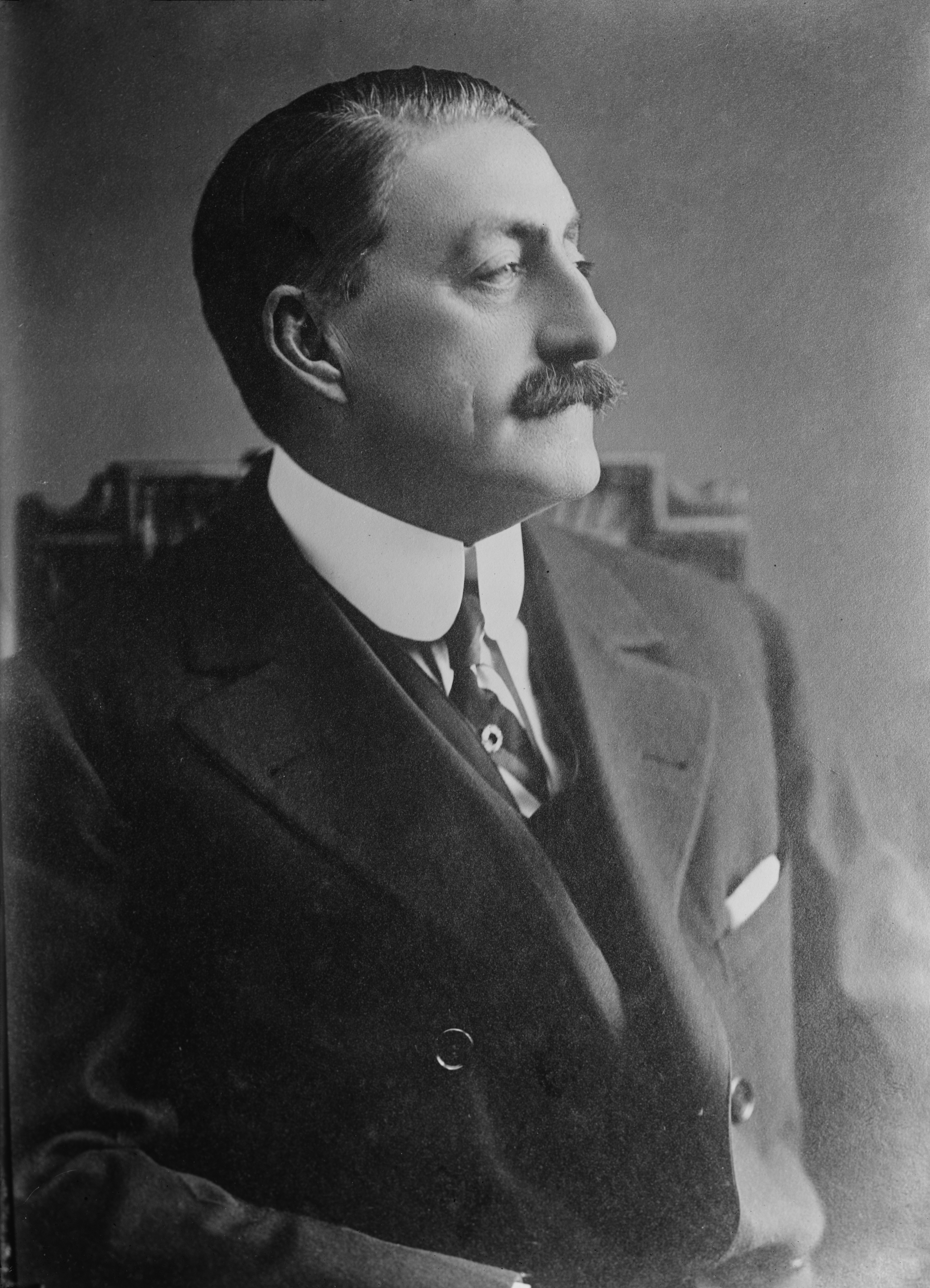
- Born: November 13, 1853; Philadelphia, Pennsylvania, U.S.
- Died: July 9, 1927 (aged 73); San Francisco, California, U.S.
- Spouse: Josephine Baker
- Children: Louise Drew
- Parent(s): John Drew; Louisa Lane Drew
- Relatives: Louisa Drew Mendum (sister); Georgie Drew Barrymore (sister); Sidney Drew (brother)
- Family: Drew family

John Drew Jr. (November 13, 1853 – July 9, 1927), commonly known as John Drew during his life, was an American stage actor noted for his roles in Shakespearean comedy, society drama, and light comedies. He was considered to be the leading matinee idol of his day, but unlike most matinee idols Drew's acting ability was largely undisputed.

He was a part of the prominent Drew acting family that continues today. The appellation "Jr.", distinguishing him from his long-deceased actor father, is usually dropped.

== Early life and lineage ==
John Drew Jr. was born November 13, 1853, in Philadelphia, Pennsylvania to actor John Drew Sr. and actress and theatre manager Louisa Lane. He was born to a predominantly stage family. Drew's maternal grandparents were Frederick Lane, an actor and theatre manager, and Eliza Trentner (1796–1887), a singer and actress. While his aunt was stage actress Georgiana Kinlock. He had one older sister, Louisa, and two younger siblings - Georgiana Drew and Sidney Drew, both actors. It is believed Drew had one more sister, Adine, from an affair between his father and Aunt Georgiana - this sister was also an actress.

As such, he was also the uncle of John, Ethel, and Lionel Barrymore, all of the Drew and Barrymore acting family. He also was uncle to actors Georgie Drew Mendum and Sidney Rankin Drew.

Drew was christened in 1854 in St. Stephen's Church. His godfathers were William Wheatley and William Sheridan, both involved in management of the Arch Street Theatre. His godmother was actress D.P. Bowers. He was raised in a "conventional" neighborhood in Philadelphia. His childhood best friend was Isaac T. Hopper, the grandson of the aboltionist, and his neighbor was Passmore Williamson.

Drew's father would die in early 1862, when he was just eight years old.

When Drew was ten, he would be sent to Village Green, a military school and from there he would go to another boarding school Andalusia Academy in Bucks County. After a family friend has expressed disdain of Andalusia, Drew was pulled from the institution and moved to the Episcopal Academy in Philadelphia. As Drew had said, a good amount of his education was "disrupted" by the on-going Civil War. Two uncles, Edward and George Drew, had died in war and the fall of Richmond had canceled school. In April 1865, he was eleven years old when John Wilkes Booth, a family friend and co-star of his grandmother, assassinated President Abraham Lincoln.

His first role as a boy was "Plumper" in Cool as a Cucumber at his mother's Arch Street Theater.

== Life and career ==
After having numerous small roles in his mother's plays, Drew chose to move to New York City in hopes for bigger roles in January 1875. Here he was associated originally with the company of Augustin Daly, a man known for managing and training with grim efficiency. He made his first appearance with Daly's company in the 1875 Broadway production of The Big Bonanza, alongside Fanny Davenport. He continued to work for Daly into the 1880s. Under Daly's management, John Drew developed his reputation for versatility, appearing in many varieties of play, but especially in contemporary works that are rarely performed or remembered today. His frequent leading lady with Daly was Ada Rehan, who he held the "most wholehearted admiration and affection for". The two originally met in his mother's theatre.

While in Daly's company, Drew met Maurice Barrymore in a production of Hamlet. The two became friends and he brought Barrymore home to meet his family. Drew's sister, Georgie, and Barrymore began courting and would marry on December 31, 1876. This would unite the two established theatrical families - the Drews and the Barrymores - and contribute to a lineage that would dominate American stage acting for decades. This union is frequently cited by theatre historians as foundational to the emergence of the Barrymore acting dynasty in American cultural history. Their descendants continued in the performing arts across multiple generations. He would also act alongside Edwin Booth, of the Booth acting family.

Drew left Daly in 1892 to join Charles Frohman's company. He had a long association with Frohman and leading lady Maude Adams. In these years under Frohman, John Drew's stardom was established. His first play with Frohman was The Masked Ball, a comedy adapted from a French play. This show was primarily a vehicle to establish Drew's stardom under Frohman, and it succeeded in that. Drew's career began to plateau after Froham's sudden death in the 1915 sinking of the RMS Lusitania.

His memoirs, titled My Years on the Stage, were published in 1922. His final Broadway play was The Circle co-starring fellow veteran star Mrs. Leslie Carter and proved to be a popular comeback for the two Victorian actors.

Highly esteemed by his fellow actors, John Drew was elected lifetime president of New York City’s theatrical club The Players.

== Personal life ==
Drew and his wife, Josephine Baker, had one daughter, Louise Drew. Louise married Broadway actor Jack Devereaux and they had a son, John Drew Devereaux.

=== Death ===
He died in San Francisco on July 9, 1927, shortly after being visited by his nephews John and Lionel Barrymore, both of whom had taken time off from movie-making on the West Coast. After cremation, his remains were taken to Philadelphia and interred at Mount Vernon Cemetery alongside his wife.

== Theatre ==
| Year | Title | Role | Theatre | Notes | Ref. |
|---|---|---|---|---|---|
| 1873 | Cool as a Cucumber | Plumper | Arch Street Theatre | | |
| 1875 | The Big Bonanza | Bob Ruggles | Fifth Avenue Theatre | Original cast | |
| 1875 | Hamlet | Rosencrantz | | | |
| 1875 | Richard II | Sir Pierce of Exton | | | |

== See also ==
- Barrymore family
- Drew family
