= Mr. Barnes of New York (1914 film) =

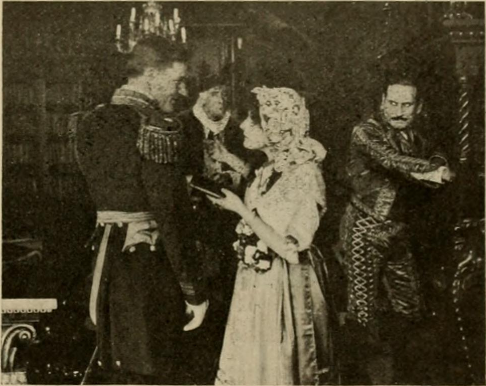
- Directed by: Maurice Costello; Robert Gaillard
- Written by: Archibald Clavering Gunter (novel); Eugene Mullin
- Produced by: J. Stuart Blackton
- Starring: Maurice Costello; Mary Charleson; Darwin Karr
- Production company: Vitagraph Company of America
- Distributed by: General Film Company
- Release date: May 1, 1914
- Running time: 6 reels
- Country: United States
- Languages: Silent; English intertitles

Mr. Barnes of New York is a 1914 American silent drama film directed by Maurice Costello and Robert Gaillard and starring Costello, Mary Charleson and Darwin Karr. It is an adaptation of Archibald Clavering Gunter's novel of the same name.

== Cast ==
- Maurice Costello as Mr. Barnes
- Mary Charleson as Marina Paoli
- Darwin Karr as Gerald Anstruther
- Naomi Childers as Enid Anstruther
- Adele DeGarde as Maude
- Robert Gaillard as Gaspard Lefebre
- William Humphrey as Count Musso Danella
- Charles Kent as Tomasso
- S. Rankin Drew as Antonio Paoli
- Donald Hall as British Dueler
- George Stevens as British Dueler's Second
- Jack Delson as Andre de Belloc
- Alberta Gallatin as Lady Chartris
- Albert Roccardi as Train Guard

== Bibliography ==
- Goble, Alan. The Complete Index to Literary Sources in Film. Walter de Gruyter, 1999.
