= Naomi Childers =

American actress (1892–1964)

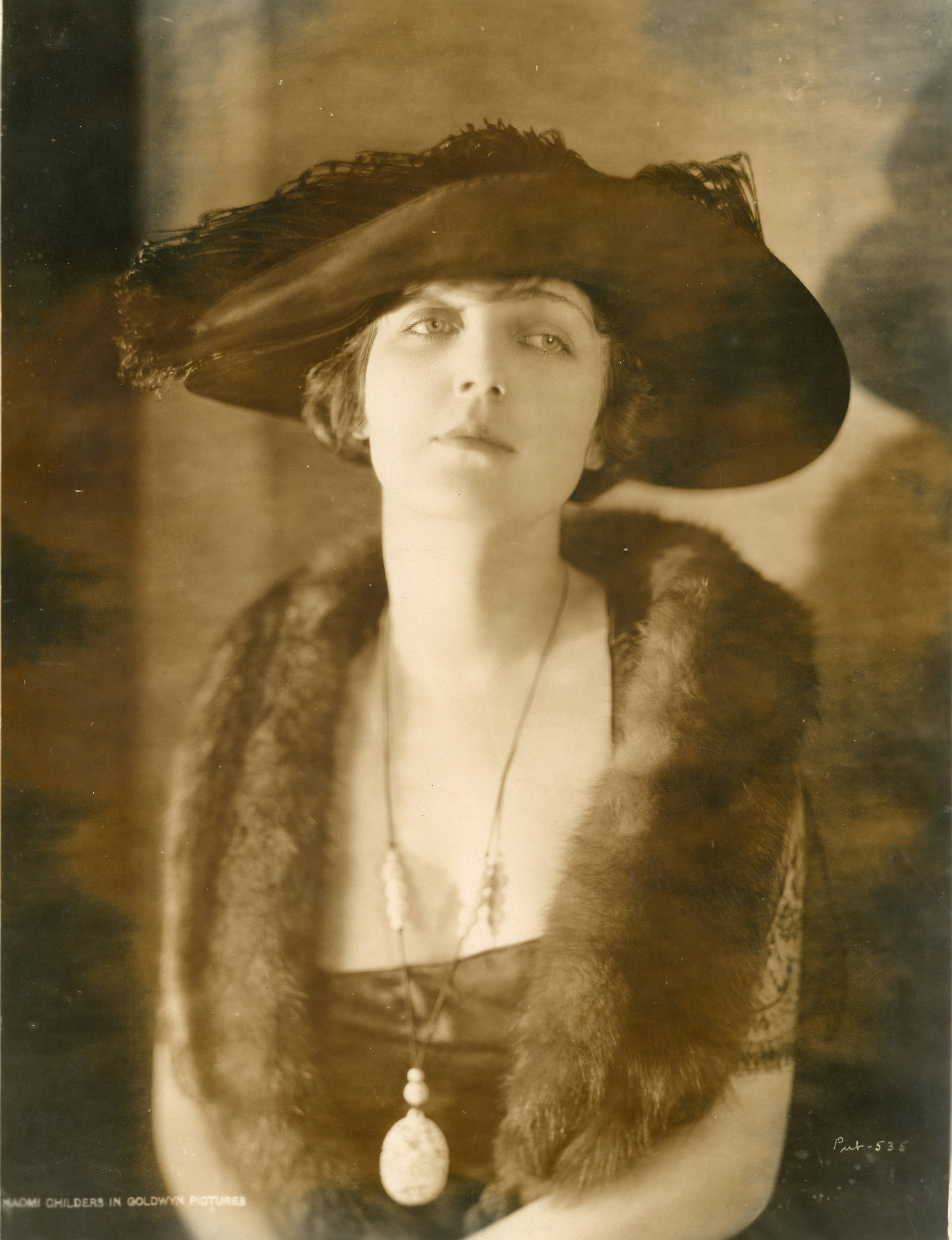
- Childers c. 1916
- Born: November 15, 1892; Pottstown, Pennsylvania, U.S.
- Died: May 9, 1964 (aged 71); Hollywood, California, U.S.
- Resting place: Valhalla Memorial Park Cemetery
- Occupation: Actress
- Spouse: Luther A. Reed (m. 1920; div. 1929)

Naomi Weston Childers (November 15, 1892 – May 9, 1964), was an American silent film actress whose career lasted until the mid-20th century.

== English ancestry, child actress ==
She was born of English parentage in Pottstown, Pennsylvania. Later in life she took pride in being descended from a long line of British ancestors. Her childhood was spent in St. Louis, Missouri, where she was educated in the Maryville convent. Childers began acting at the age of three, reciting at a notable function. She played a Chopin number at an adult recital at age eight. Characterized by her wisdom in theater and silent films, she performed various performances with the great creator of silent films, Charles S. Chaplin. It was not until 1942 that Childers left the talkies. When she was ten Childers performed the title roles in both Red Riding Hood and Alice in Wonderland at the Odeon Theater in St. Louis. In 1912 she played in The Great Name and Madame X. The theatrical presentations featured Henry Kolker and Dorothy Donnelly. When she was 11 years old, Childers won a contest for interpretation and gave a series of readings at the Louisiana Purchase Exposition in St. Louis.

On Broadway, Childers appeared in The Great Name (1911) and Ready Money.

== Hollywood films ==
Childers was in movies beginning in 1913. She appeared in The Turn of the Road (1915) and The Writing on the Wall (1916). She was associated with the Vitagraph company for four years. Her most popular role was in Womanhood, the Glory of the Nation. In this film she performed a most modern characterization of Joan of Arc. In 1917 she began working with the Commonwealth Company. Childers possessed a preference for comedy, yet she was in constant demand to play more serious roles. Her character work in motion pictures was a strong asset. In the 1919 Sam Goldwyn film Lord and Lady Algy, Childers was cast in the leading feminine role. She depicted the wife of the young Lord Algy, played by Tom Moore. As a titled Englishwoman she revealed a cold exterior, but retained a warm nature.

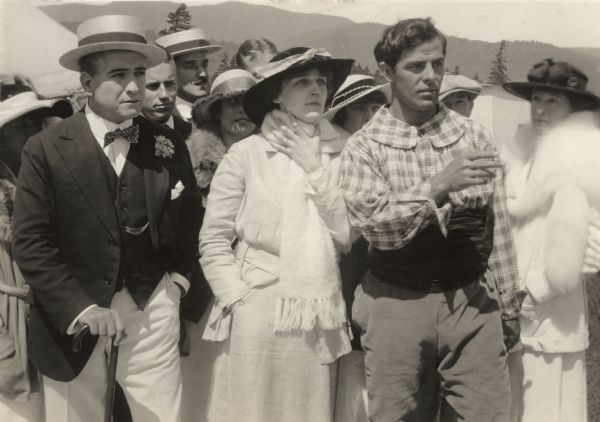
Still from the 1915 Vitagraph production Anselo Lee with (left to right) Donald Hall, Naomi Childers, and Antonio Moreno.

== Physical beauty ==
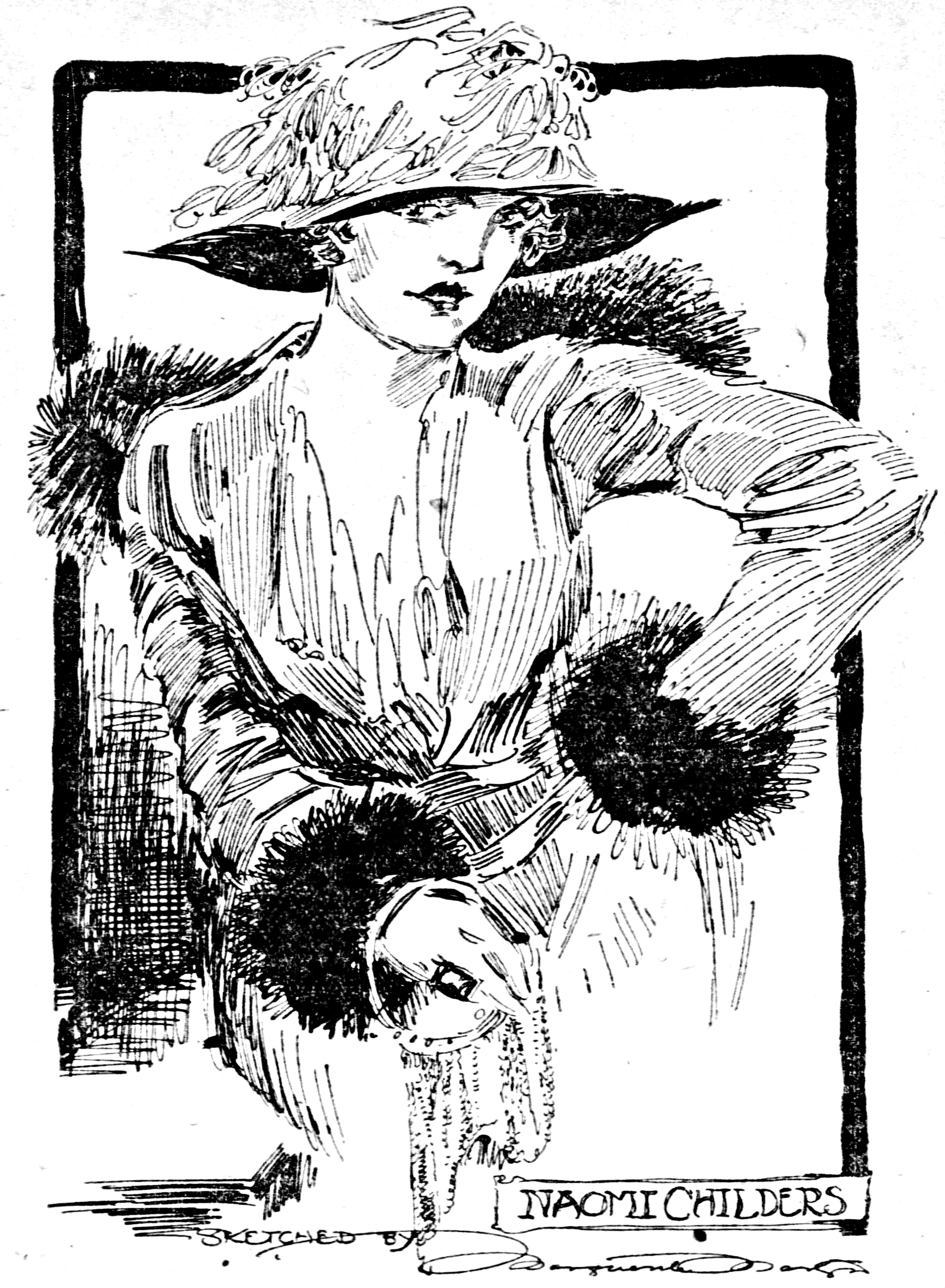
Childers at age 24, sketch by Marguerite Martyn

The Motion Picture Studio Directory of 1916 contains a biographical sketch of Childers as well as a physical description of the actress. In that reference she is described as "5 ft. 7 in." in height; 130 pounds; with "light complexion, golden brown hair, [and] blue eyes". Childers' good looks were highly regarded at the peak of her career. She was once voted the most beautiful woman in Japan, and contemporaries also compared her in appearance to the legendary Sarah Bernhardt. Often employed as a model, Childers enjoyed the attention of artists across the United States, many of whom referred to her as "the girl with the Grecian face."

== Personal life ==
In 1919, Childers became engaged to Harold Darling Shattuck, the head of a large candy making company. Their wedding was scheduled for June, but was postponed until fall, because Childers was in Texas for an event. The actress referred to her fiancé as her Chocolate Soldier.

In December 1929, she was given a divorce from Luther A. Reed, Hollywood scenario writer and motion picture director, on grounds of desertion. The superior court of Los Angeles, California awarded Childers custody of an eight-year-old son and granted $250 a month alimony. Childers alleged Reed deserted her following nine years of married life.

== Poverty and death ==
When Louis B. Mayer discovered Childers had come into hard times in later years, he granted her a lifetime contract from MGM. She continued to play numerous, often uncredited, roles into the early 1950s. Childers died in Hollywood, California in 1964, age 71. She is buried at Valhalla Memorial Park Cemetery.

== Partial filmography ==
- Mr. Barnes of New York (1914)
- Anselo Lee (1915)
- The Island of Regeneration (1915)
- The Man Who Couldn't Beat God (1915)
- The Price of Fame (1916)
- Womanhood, the Glory of the Nation (1917)
- Lord and Lady Algy (1919)
- After His Own Heart (1919)
- The Divorcee (1919)
- The World and Its Woman (1919)
- Shadows of Suspicion (1919)
- The Gay Lord Quex (1919)
- Human Desire (1919)
- Blind Man's Eyes (1919)
- Duds (1920)
- Earthbound (1920)
- Courage (1921)
- Hold Your Horses (1921)
- Mr. Barnes of New York (1922)
- Success (1923)
- Restless Wives (1924)
- Virtuous Liars (1924)

== Bibliography ==
- Fresno, California Bee, "Naomi Childers Reed Divorces Scenario Writer", Friday, December 13, 1929,
- La Crosse, Wisconsin Tribune, "News Notes from Movieland", Wednesday, May 3, 1918, Page 3.
- Madison, Wisconsin Capitol Times, "News Notes from Movieland", Thursday Afternoon, December 20, 1917, Page 4.
- Newark, Ohio Daily Advocate, "Amusements", Wednesday, December 17, 1919, Page 8.
- Sandusky, Ohio Star-Journal, "News Notes from Movieland", Monday, November 27, 1916, Page 9.
- Charles Foster, Stardust and Shadows, 2000, Toronto: Dundurn Press, p. 208.
