= James Lewis (actor) =

American actor

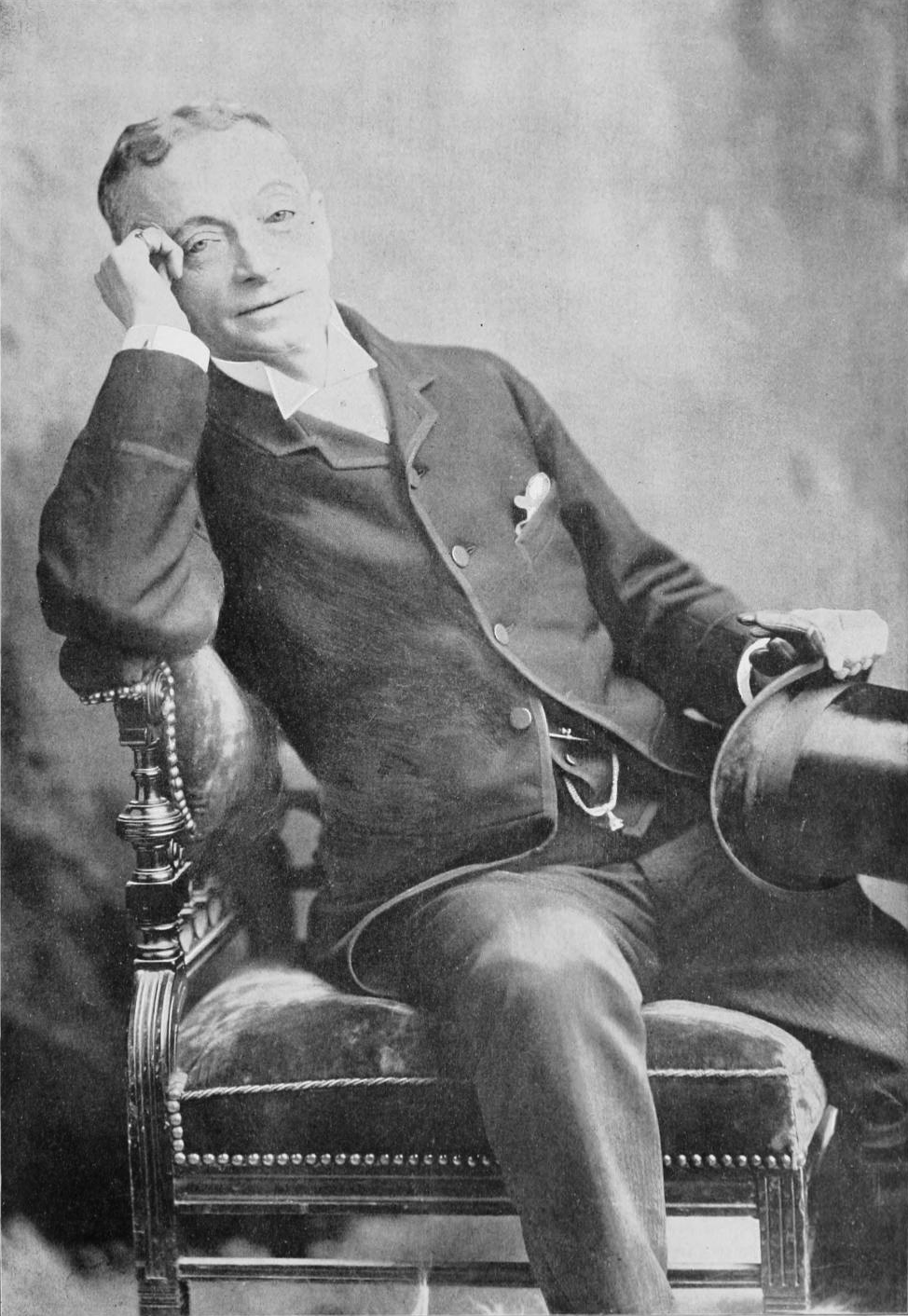
Lewis circa 1892

James Lewis (1840–1896) was an American comedic actor.

== Biography ==
James Lewis was born in Troy, New York in October 1840. There, he made his first stage appearance in 1858, playing Farmer Gammon in The Writing on the Wall. At the outbreak of the Civil War he was in the South, and narrowly escaped being detained there by the blockade. Subsequently, he traveled much in the Middle West. His first appearance in New York City was in 1866, in the farce Your Life's in Danger, presented at the Olympic Theatre by Mrs. John Wood's company. Afterward he was very successful in Boston in the role of Dick Swiveller. In 1869 he became the leading comedian in Augustin Daly's company in New York City, and he retained this position during the remainder of his life. He was highly successful in almost every comedy part that he played.

He died in West Hampton Dunes, New York on September 10, 1896.
