= William Pleater Davidge =

American actor

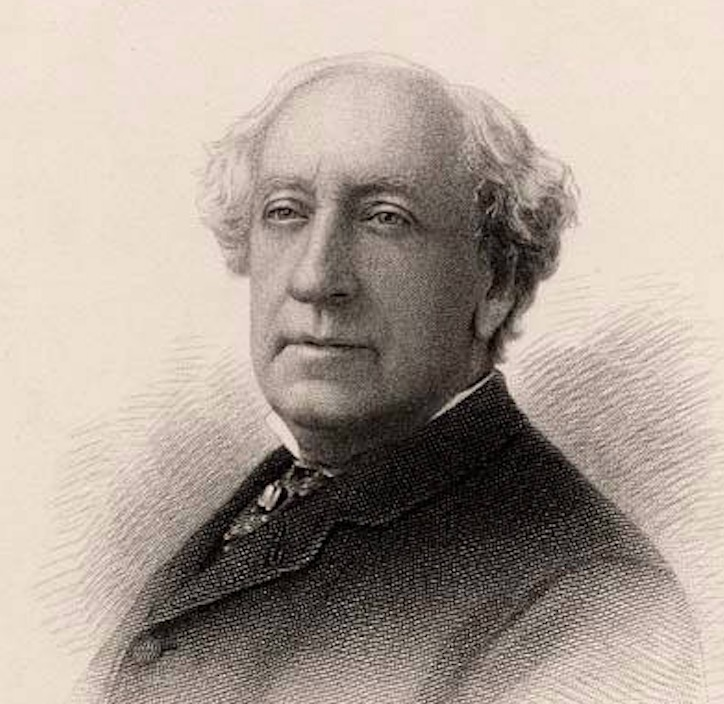
- Born: 17 April 1814; London
- Died: 7 August 1888 (aged 74); Cheyenne, Wyoming
- Occupations: comedian, actor

William Pleater Davidge (17 April 1814 – 7 August 1888) was an English comedian, who came to the United States in 1850 and became identified with the American Stage.

== Biography ==
He was born in London, and appeared as a youthful amateur at Drury Lane as James in The Miller's Maid. He appeared at Nottingham in 1836, and acted in London, on 26 September of that year, in the Haunted Tower. Afterward, he acted in various English cities, especially in Manchester.

His first appearance in America was in August, 1850, as Sir Peter Teazle at the old Broadway Theatre, New York; later he supported many well-known actors in the metropolis and elsewhere, among them Edwin Forrest, Gustavus V. Brooke, Julia Dean, Lola Montez, and Fanny Davenport. After leaving the old Broadway Theatre in 1855, he made a tour through the country. He was a member of F. B. Conway's "star combination," and in 1863 was one of Mrs. John Wood's company at the Olympic Theatre, where he remained two seasons. He afterward took part in the Shakespearean revivals at Winter Garden Theatre, and, in August 1867, appeared as Eccles, in Caste, at the new Broadway Theatre near Broome Street. He was at Daly's Fifth Avenue Theatre from 1869 until 1877, then traveled with Miss Fanny Davenport's company, and in 1879 was the original Dick Deadeye, in HMS Pinafore, at the Standard Theatre. In 1885, he became a member of the Madison Square Theatre company.

Davidge played over one thousand parts during his career. Among his best parts, besides those already mentioned, were Bishopriggs in Man and Wife, Old Hardy in The Belle's Stratagem, Hardcastle in She Stoops to Conquer, and Croaker in The Good-Natur'd Man. In Shakespeare's comedies he was successful as Caliban, Touchstone, Dogberry, Nick Bottom, and Old Gobbo. He died at Cheyenne, Wyoming, August 7, 1888.

== Works ==
He was the author of a volume of autobiographical reminiscences called Footlight Flashes (New York, 1866); The Drama Defended (New York, 1859); and other works.

== Family ==
His son, William Davidge (11 March 1847 - 1899), also an actor, was born at Manchester, England, and brought to the United States when a child of three years. He made his first appearance in the French Theatre, New York, in the burlesque of The Lady of the Lions. During his career he played with William H. Crane, Kate Claxton, and later for several seasons with Roland Reed. He died in Chicago.
