= Dorothy Davenport =

American actress (1895–1977)

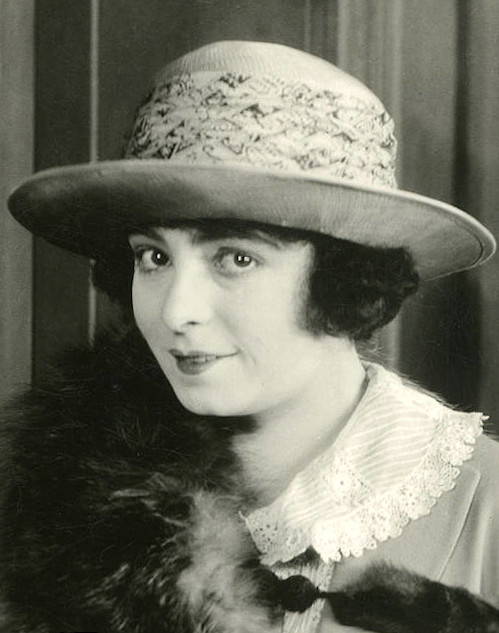
- Davenport in 1923
- Born: Fannie Dorothy Davenport; March 13, 1895; Boston, Massachusetts, U.S.
- Died: October 12, 1977 (aged 82); Los Angeles, California, U.S.
- Resting place: Forest Lawn Memorial Park, Glendale
- Other names: Mrs. Wallace Reid; Dorothy Reid
- Years active: 1910–1956
- Spouse: Wallace Reid (m. 1913; died 1923)
- Children: 2, including Wallace Reid Jr.
- Parents: Harry Davenport (father); Alice Davenport (mother)
- Relatives: Edward Loomis Davenport (grandfather); Fanny Vining Davenport (grandmother); Phyllis Rankin (step-mother); Arthur Rankin (step-brother)

Fannie Dorothy Davenport (March 13, 1895 – October 12, 1977) was an American actress, screenwriter, film director, and producer.

Born into a family of film performers, Davenport had her own independent career before her marriage to the film actor and director Wallace Reid in 1913. Reid's star rose steadily, making feature films at a pace of one every seven weeks, until 1919 when a dose of morphine administered for an injury on location grew into an addiction. Reid died in January 1923 at age 31. Davenport took her own story as source material and co-produced Human Wreckage (1923), in which she was billed as "Mrs. Wallace Reid" and played the role of a drug addict's wife. She advertised the film in terms of a moral crusade.

Davenport followed its success with other social-conscience films on other topics, Broken Laws (1924) and The Red Kimono (1925), with expensive litigation connected with the latter. While Davenport's own production company dissolved in the late 1920s, she continued to take on smaller writing and directing roles. In 1929 Davenport directed Linda, a film about a woman who gives up her happiness for the sake of men and social expectations. Davenport directed her last film in 1934; however, she continued in the film industry in other roles until her last known credit in 1956 as dialogue supervisor of The First Traveling Saleslady.

== Early career ==
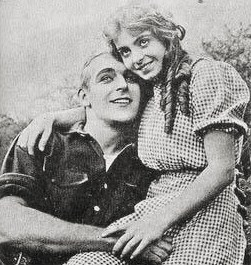
Wallace Reid and Davenport on the set of His Only Son (1912)

Dorothy Davenport was born in Boston, Massachusetts on March 13, 1895. Davenport's father, Harry Davenport, was a Broadway star and comedian, and her mother, Alice Davenport, was a film actress who appeared in at least 140 films. Dorothy's grandparents were the 19th-century character actors Edward Loomis Davenport, a successful tragedian stage actor, and Fanny Vining Davenport, who began acting at age 3. Their daughter and Dorothy's aunt, Fanny Davenport, was considered one of the great stage actresses of the time.

Davenport's first professional role was in a stock company at age 6. At age 14, Davenport continued in the entertainment industry, doing a type of burlesque.

Davenport attended school in Brooklyn and Roanoke, Virginia. At age 16, after performing vaudeville for a year and a half, she moved from Boston to Southern California to pursue acting. She began her career with the Nestor Film Company, later acquired by Universal Pictures. Her first known film appearance was in Life Cycle in a supporting role. She was a talented horsewoman and did many of her own stunts in films.

Davenport and Wallace Reid were prominent during Nestor's early years. Although Wallace Reid left for six months to make another film, he promptly returned to Nestor, and the pair married in October 1913.

The pair left Universal to work on other films but returned in 1916. On June 18, 1917, Davenport gave birth to her first son, Wallace Reid Jr., in Los Angeles. The birth of her son caused Davenport to take a step back from her career to become a full-time mother. In 1920, Davenport and Reid adopted their second child, daughter Betty Anna Reid (1919–1967).

== Later career ==
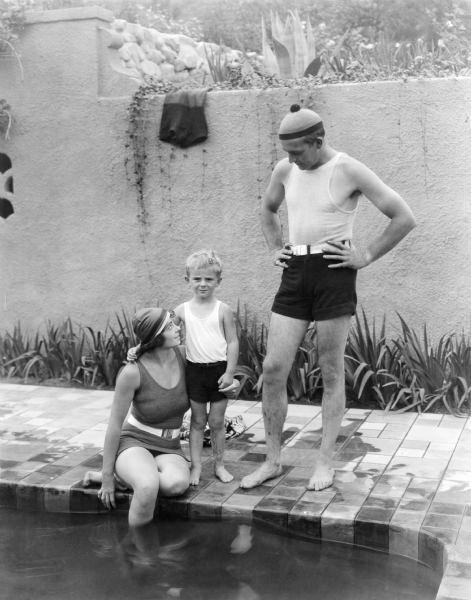
Dorothy Davenport Reid, Wallace Reid, Jr., and Wallace Reid (1920)

While filming on location in California for The Valley of the Giants (1919), Wallace Reid was injured in a train wreck. As a remedy for this injury's pain, studio doctors administered large doses of morphine to Reid, to which he became addicted. Reid's health slowly grew worse over the next few years, and he died of the addiction in 1923.

After Reid's death, Davenport and Thomas Ince co-produced the film Human Wreckage (1923) with James Kirkwood, Sr., Bessie Love and Lucille Ricksen, a film that dealt with the dangers of narcotics addiction. It was developed and marketed with expert assistance from members of the Los Angeles Anti-Narcotics League. Davenport took Human Wreckage on a roadshow engagement with personal appearances, followed up with another "social conscience" picture about excessive mother-love called Broken Laws in 1924, again billed as "Mrs. Wallace Reid".

Davenport then produced The Red Kimono (1925) about prostitution. Both Human Wreckage and The Red Kimono were banned in the United Kingdom by the British Board of Film Censors in 1926. Kimono is based on a real case of prostitution that took place in New Orleans in 1917. Billing it as a true story, Davenport used the real name of the woman played by Priscilla Bonner, who as a consequence sued Davenport and won a landmark privacy case.

She later continued in the social-consciousness line with films Linda (1929), Sucker Money (1933), Road to Ruin (1934), and The Woman Condemned (1934), and worked as a producer, writer, and dialogue director. Among her last credits is the co-author of the screenplay for Footsteps in the Fog (1955), and as dialogue director for The First Traveling Saleslady (1956) with Ginger Rogers. In the 1970s, near the end of her life, Dorothy still had a print of her husband's 1921 feature Forever. She gave the print to an organization planning a museum. The museum plans fell through, and Dorothy's last remaining print of Wally's favorite movie was lost.

On October 12, 1977, Davenport died at the Motion Picture & Television Country House and Hospital in Woodland Hills, California, aged 82. She is interred with her husband at Forest Lawn Memorial Park, Glendale.

== Selected filmography ==
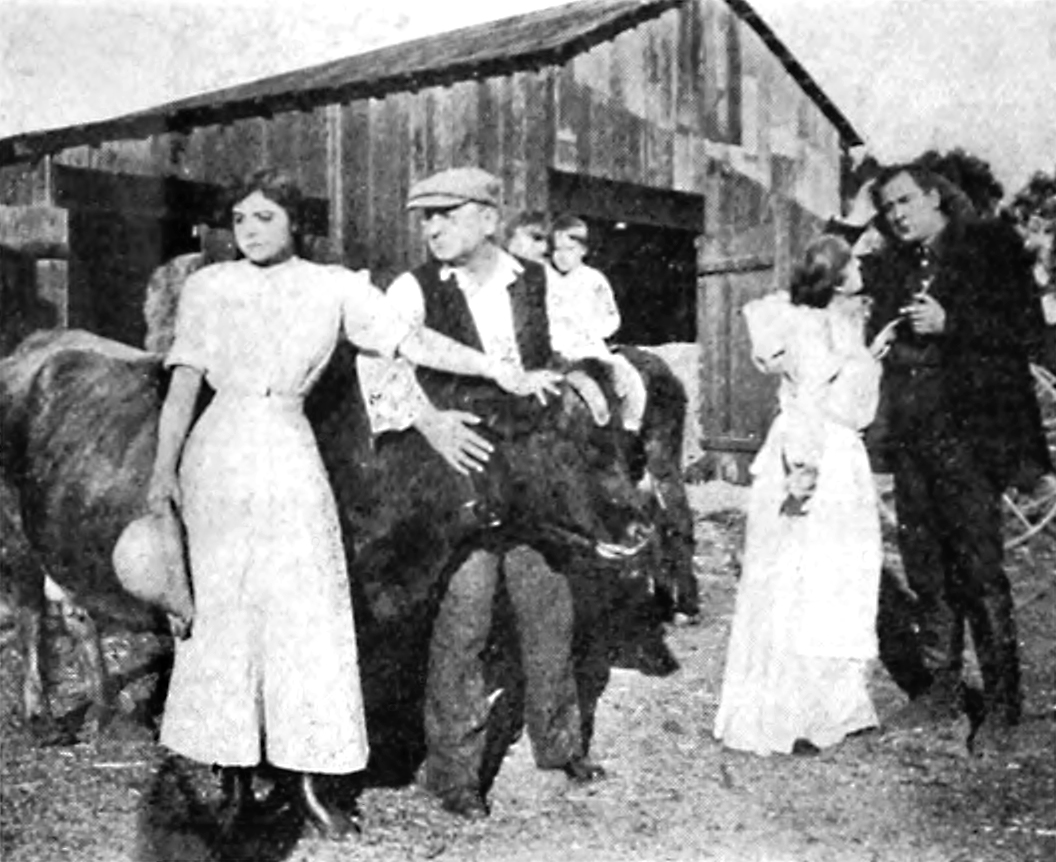
Dorothy Davenport (left) in The Best Man Wins (1911)

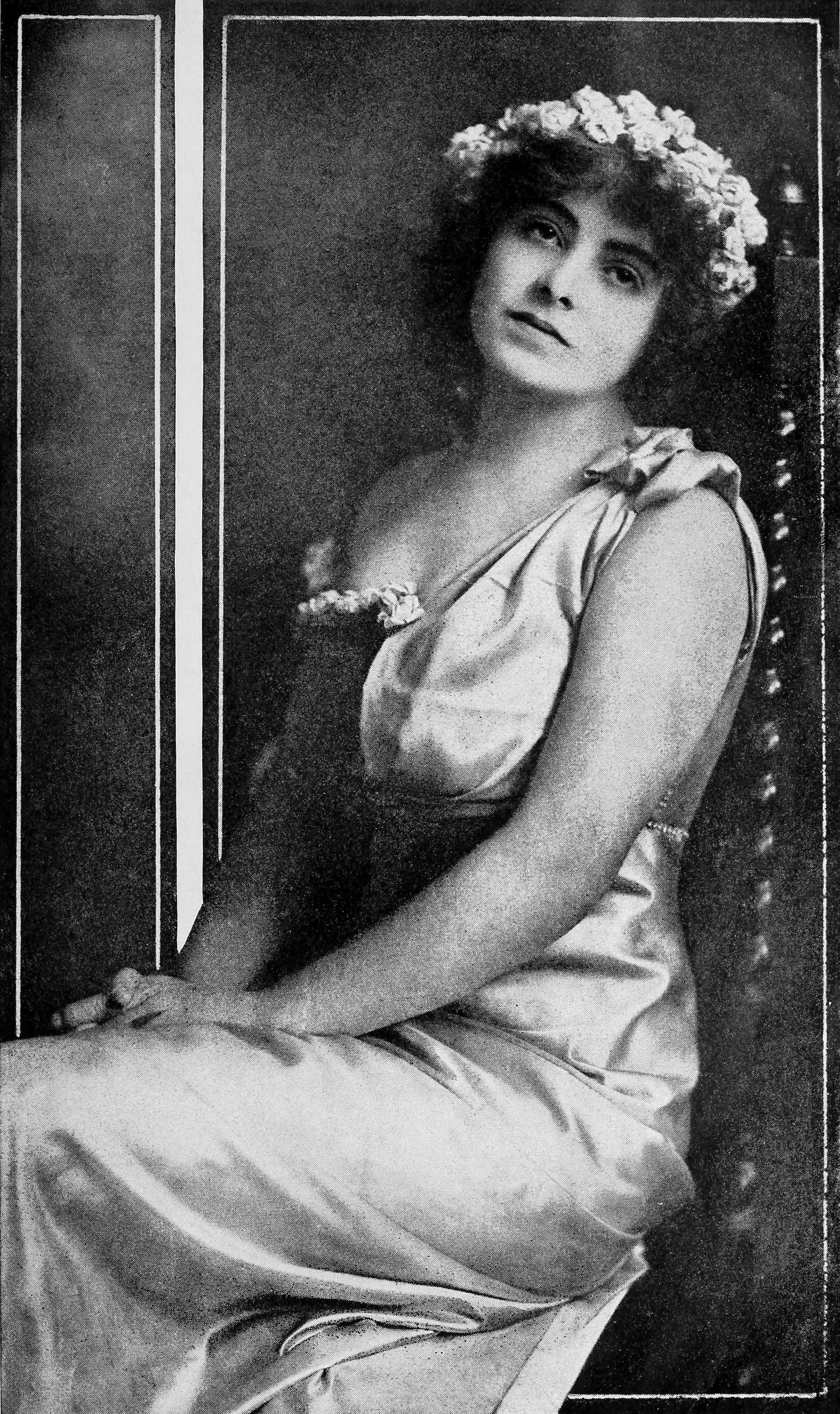
Dorothy Davenport in 1916

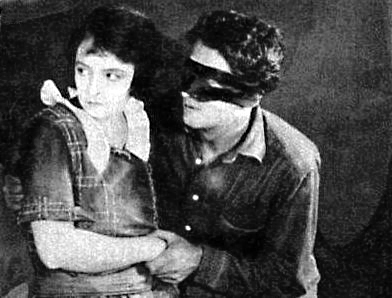
Davenport and Lester Cuneo in The Masked Avenger (1922)

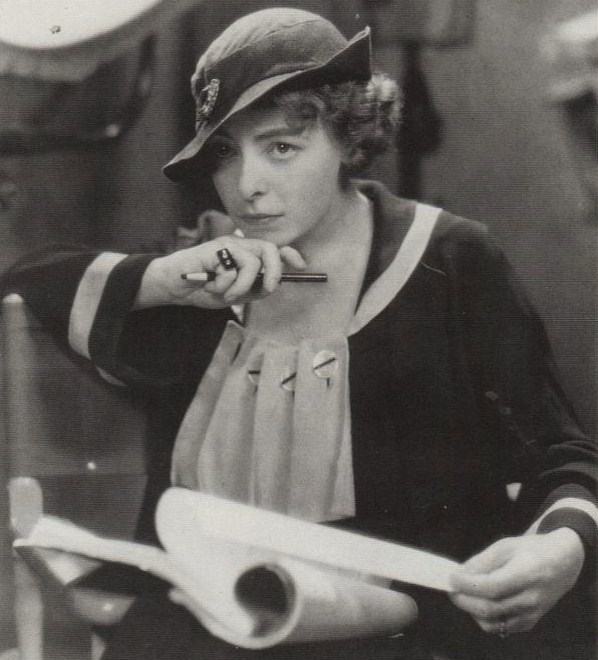
Davenport on the set of Human Wreckage (1923)

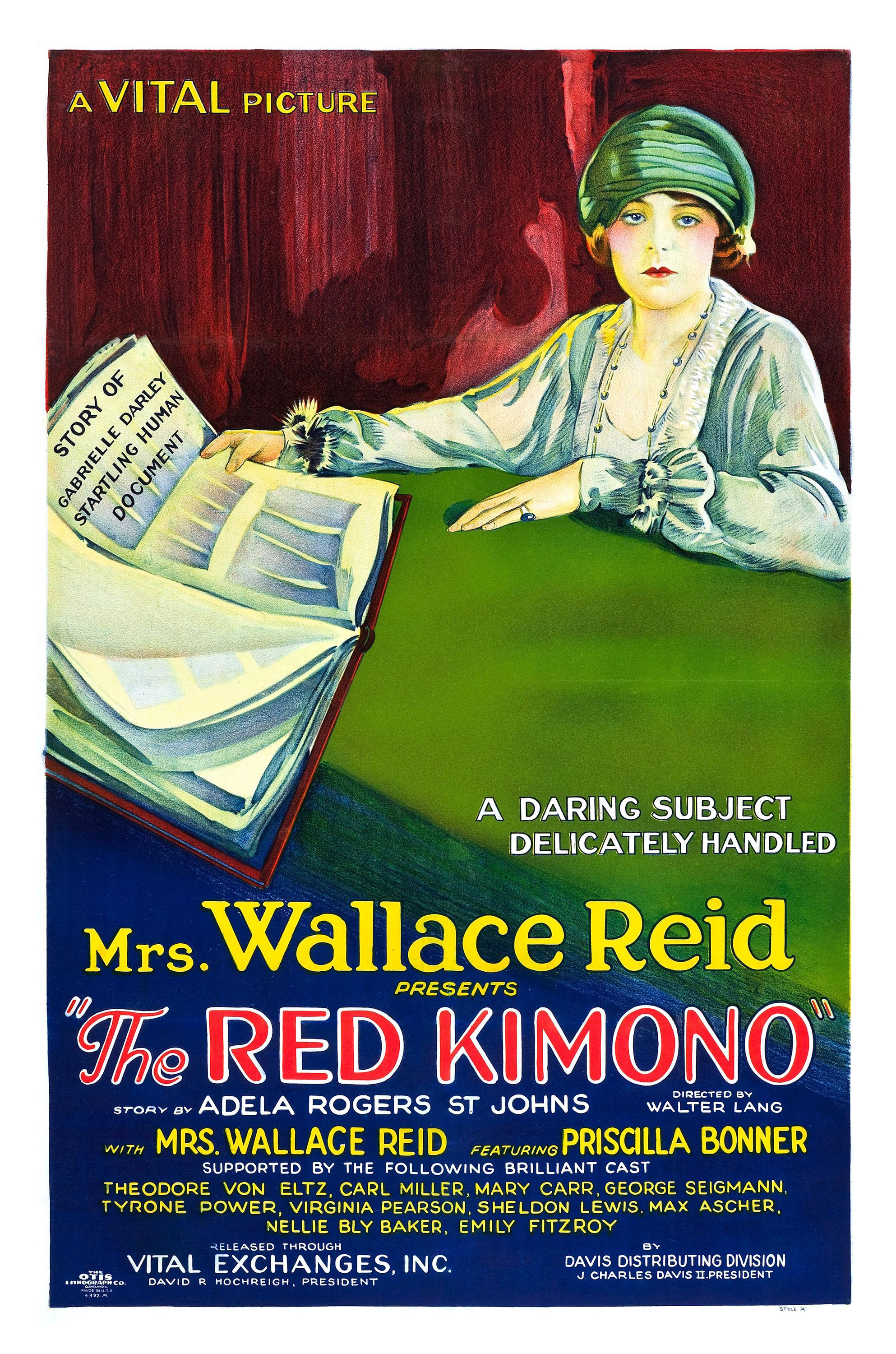
Poster for The Red Kimono (1925)

Year	Title	Role	Notes
1910	The Troublesome Baby	Cast member	
1910	A Mohawk's Way	Indian	
1911	The Best Man Wins	Cast member	
1912	His Only Son	Cast member	
1915	The Explorer	Lucy Allerton	
1915	Mr. Grex of Monte Carlo	Grand Duchess Feodora	
1915	The Unknown	Nancy Preston	
1916	A Yoke of Gold	Carmen	
1916	The Devil's Bondwoman	Beverly Hope	
1916	Barriers of Society	Martha Gorham	
1916	Doctor Neighbor	Hazel Rogers	
1916	Her Husband's Faith	Mabel Otto	
1916	The Unattainable	Bessie Gale	
1916	Black Friday	Elinor Rossitor	
1916	The Way of the World	Beatrice Farley	
1917	The Squaw Man's Son	Edith, Lady Effington	
1917	The Girl and the Crisis	Ellen Wilmot	
1917	Mothers of Men	Clara Madison	(re-released in 1921)
1917	The Scarlet Crystal	Marie Delys	
1917	Treason	Luella Brysk	
1920	The Fighting Chance	Leila Mortimer	
1921	Every Woman's Problem	Clara Madison	
1922	The Masked Avenger	Valerie Putnam	as Mrs. Wallace Reid
1923	Human Wreckage	Ethel MacFarland	as Mrs. Wallace Reid
1924	Broken Laws	Joan Allen	as Mrs. Wallace Reid
1925	The Red Kimono	Herself	Prologue, as Mrs. Wallace Reid
1926	The Dude Wrangler		Producer, as Mrs. Wallace Reid
1926	The Earth Woman		Producer, as Mrs. Wallace Reid
1927	The Satin Woman	Mrs. Jean Taylor	as Mrs. Wallace Reid
1928	Hellship Bronson	Mrs. Bronson	as Mrs. Wallace Reid
1929	Linda		Director, as Mrs. Wallace Reid
1932	The Racing Strain		Writer (story), as Mrs. Wallace Reid
1933	Man Hunt	Mrs. Scott	as Mrs. Wallace Reid
1933	Sucker Money		Co-director, as Dorothy Reid
1934	The Road to Ruin	Mrs. Merrill	Also director and writer (story), as Mrs. Wallace Reid
1934	The Woman Condemned		Director, as Mrs. Wallace Reid
1935	Redhead		Producer, as Dorothy Reid
1935	Honeymoon, Limited		Producer and screenwriter, as Dorothy Reid
1935	Two Sinners		Story supervisor, as Mrs. Wallace Reid
1935	Women Must Dress		Writer (story and screenplay), as Dorothy Reid
1936	The House of a Thousand Candles		Producer, as Dorothy Reid
1937	Paradise Isle		Producer, as Dorothy Reid
1937	A Bride for Henry		Producer, as Dorothy Reid
1938	Prison Break		Screenwriter, as Dorothy Reid
1938	Rose of the Rio Grande		Producer, as Dorothy Reid
1940	The Old Swimmin' Hole		Screenwriter, as Dorothy Reid
1940	Drums of the Desert		Screenwriter, as Dorothy Davenport together with George Waggner
1947	Curley		Screenwriter, as Dorothy Reid
1948	Who Killed Doc Robbin		Screenwriter, as Dorothy Reid
1949	Impact		Screenwriter, as Dorothy Reid
1951	Rhubarb		Screenwriter, as Dorothy Reid
1952	It Grows on Trees		Dialogue coach, as Dorothy Reid
1954	Francis Covers the Big Town		Dialogue director, as Dorothy Reid
1955	Footsteps in the Fog		Screenwriter, as Dorothy Reid
1956	The First Traveling Saleslady		Dialogue supervisor, as Dorothy Reid
