= Fanny Vining Davenport =

British actress

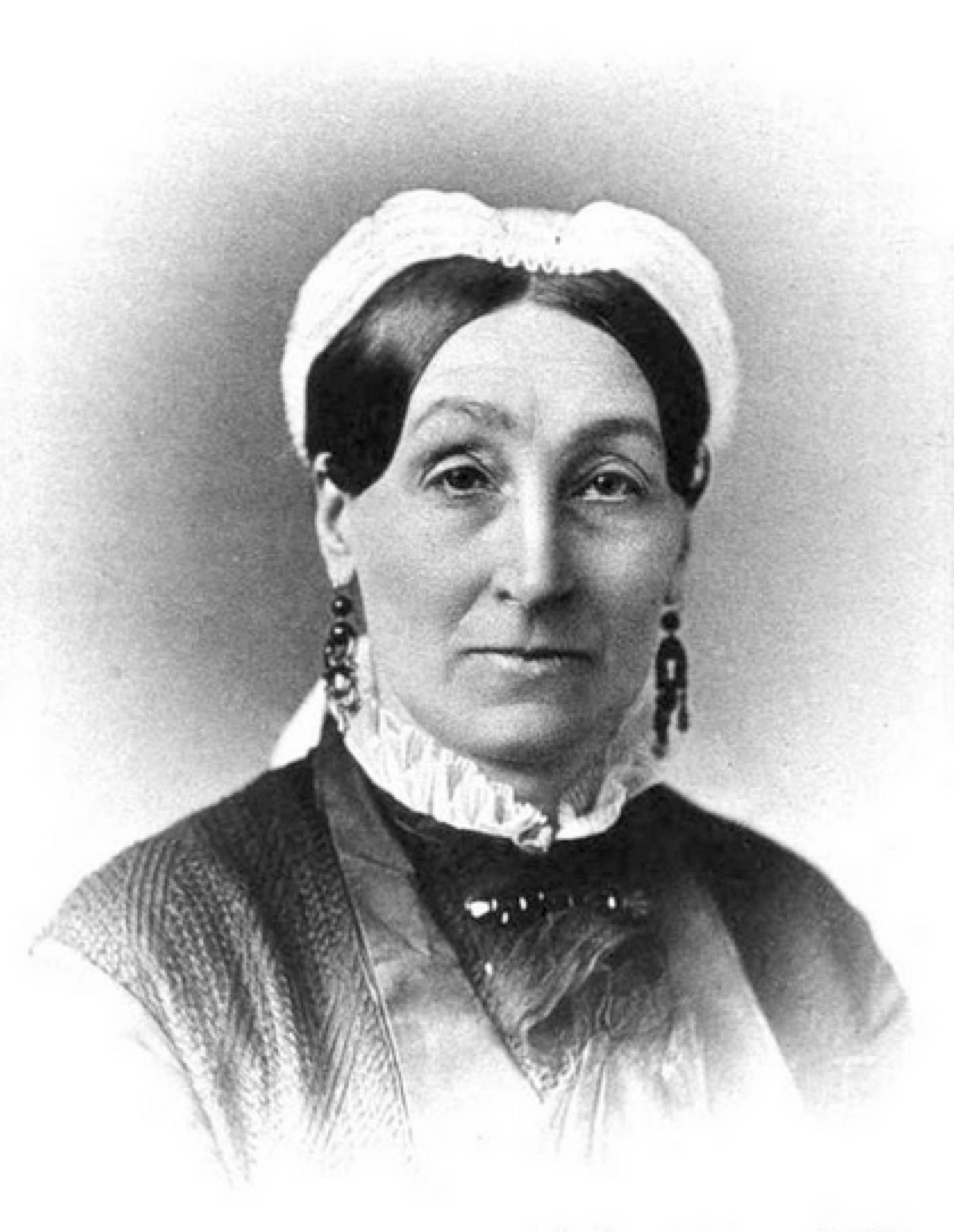
- Mrs. E. L. Davenport
- Born: Fanny Elizabeth Vining; July 6, 1829; London, England
- Died: July 20, 1891 (aged 62); Canton, Pennsylvania, U.S.
- Other name: Mrs. E. L. Davenport
- Occupation: Actor
- Spouse: Edward Loomis Davenport (m. 1849; died 1877)
- Children: 9, including Fanny and Harry
- Relatives: May Davenport Seymour (granddaughter), Anne Seymour (great-granddaughter)

Fanny Elizabeth Davenport (née Vining; 17 July 1829 – 20 July 1891) was an English actress who emigrated to America. After her marriage to American tragedian Edward Loomis Davenport, she was known as Mrs. E. L. Davenport. Their children included actress Fanny Davenport and actor Harry Davenport; their descendants include actresses Dorothy Davenport and Anne Seymour.

== Life ==
Fanny Elizabeth Vining was born in London July 6, 1829, into a large theatrical family. Her father Frederick Vining was an actor and manager of the Haymarket Theatre. Her mother was a daughter of Irish actor John Henry Johnstone. Her cousins included actors Lester Wallack and Matilda Charlotte Vining. She made her first stage appearance at age three.

Educated through her experiences with theatre people and a few years at a boarding school, Vining made her stage debut in 1847 at the Haymarket Theatre, in Romeo and Juliet. She starred opposite Gustavus Vaughan Brooke, with her father in the role of Mercutio. She went on to leading roles at London theatres with Charles Kean and William Macready.

On January 8, 1849, Vining married American actor Edward Loomis Davenport, after they performed together in the play Love by James Sheridan Knowles. For a time she retained a stage name of Fanny Vining. They immigrated to the United States in 1854. Two of their nine children died in childhood. Seven survived and all became actors.

- Fanny Davenport, born in London in (1850-1898)
- Blanche Maria Davenport, born in London in 1851
- Lily Vining Davenport, born in Glasgow in (1853-1878)
- May Marian Caroline Davenport Seymour, born in Boston in (1856-1927) (*note May's actress daughter was also called May Davenport Seymour (1883-1967) later a curator of City Museum of New York..)
- Florence Cecilia Davenport, born in (1858-1937)
- Edgar Longfellow Davenport, born in Roxbury, Massachusetts, in (1862-1918)
- Harry Davenport, born in New York City in (1866-1949)

== Retirement and death ==
Mrs. E. L. Davenport appeared frequently in leading roles with her husband. After his death September 1, 1877, she retired from the stage. She died July 20, 1891, aged 62, at her daughter Fanny's summer home in Canton, Pennsylvania, after suffering from cancer for a number of weeks.
