= The Woman Condemned =

1934 film by Dorothy Davenport

- Directed by: Dorothy Davenport
- Written by: Willis Kent (story and adaptation)
- Produced by: Willis Kent (producer)
- Starring: See below
- Cinematography: James Diamond
- Edited by: S. Roy Luby
- Distributed by: Progressive Pictures
- Release date: April 4, 1934
- Running time: 66 minutes
- Country: United States
- Language: English

The Woman Condemned is a 1934 American pre-Code film directed by Dorothy Davenport, best known as a silent actress and the wife of actor Wallace Reid.

== Plot ==
A radio star takes a vacation and is later found murdered. Barbara Hammond is accused of the murder and Jerry Beall tries to prove her innocence.

== Cast ==
- Claudia Dell as Barbara Hammond
- Lola Lane as Jane Merrick
- Richard Hemingway as Jerry Beall
- Jason Robards Sr. as Jim Wallace
- Paul Ellis as Dapper Dan
- Douglas Cosgrove as Police Chief
- Mischa Auer as Dr. Wagner
- Sheila Bromley as The Actress
- Louise Beavers as Sally, Jane's Maid
- Tom O'Brien as First Detective
- Neal Pratt as Judge
