= His Only Son (1912 film) =

1912 film

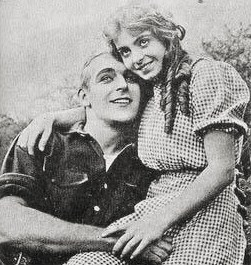
- Film still of Reid and Davenport
- Directed by: Jack Conway; Milton H. Fahrney
- Starring: Wallace Reid; Dorothy Davenport
- Production company: Nestor Film Company
- Distributed by: Universal Studios
- Release date: October 9, 1912
- Running time: 10 minutes
- Country: United States
- Languages: Silent; English intertitles

His Only Son is a 1912 American short silent Western film co-starring Wallace Reid and Dorothy Davenport. Davenport recalled not liking to work with Reid, whom she considered young and inexperienced in film, "When I came home I complained to mother because I had to play with 'this boy' when I had been playing with actors as Harold Lockwood, Henry Walthall, James Kirkwood". The two soon began dating, and married in 1913. It was directed by Jack Conway and Milton H. Fahrney, and it was Hoot Gibson's first feature.

== Plot ==
This synopsis was published in The Moving Picture World on October 5, 1912:

Bob Madden returns home slightly intoxicated and his father angrily commands him to leave the place and shift for himself. The next morning he goes, leaving his father a note: "Dear Dad:—I am going out West and try to make a man of myself. I hope some day you will be proud of me. Your son, Bob." His father relents and, after tracing him to the station, buys a ticket for the same place. In the meanwhile, Bob has arrived, and reading a notice that cowboys with outfits are wanted on the Carter ranch, he buys an outfit from a man near the station and starts for the Carter ranch. However, the foreman will not have him, as he confesses that he cannot rope, so Bob rides on until he comes upon an Outlaw's Camp, and is glad to accept their rough hospitality. In the meanwhile, the ranchman, Joseph Carter, receives his new automobile, but being unable to take his daughter, Jessie, sends her with the foreman for a ride. The machine breaks down and the chauffeur returns for parts, while the foreman takes his opportunity to force his attentions upon Jessie, her cries bring Bob and the outlaws to the scene. The foreman recognizes the outlaw chief and returning to the ranch, starts out at the head of the cowboys to capture the band. Bob has loaned Jessie his horse to return home, and the outlaws have just broke camp, so when the foreman and the boys return they only succeed in capturing Bob and hustle him off as an outlaw. Jessie arrives at the ranch, learns where the boys have gone, so together with her father, rides to the rescue, arriving just as his father comes along. The two fathers learn that they are old friends. The man at the station recognizes Bob, and general rejoicing takes place.

This review with synopsis was published in the November-December issue.

This is a genuinely interesting drama of the West, commendable for the naturalness of its story and some novel touches of humor. The principal roles, those of the father and the only son, are vigorously handled from the time of their dispute until the end, when they are reconciled through some exciting experiences with a band of outlaws. The setting, in a rough mountain country, is picturesque.

== Release ==
The film was deemed unsuitable for classification by the British Board of Film Classification.

== Cast ==
- Wallace Reid
- Dorothy Davenport
- Jack Conway
- Victoria Forde
- Hoot Gibson
