= May Davenport Seymour =

American actress

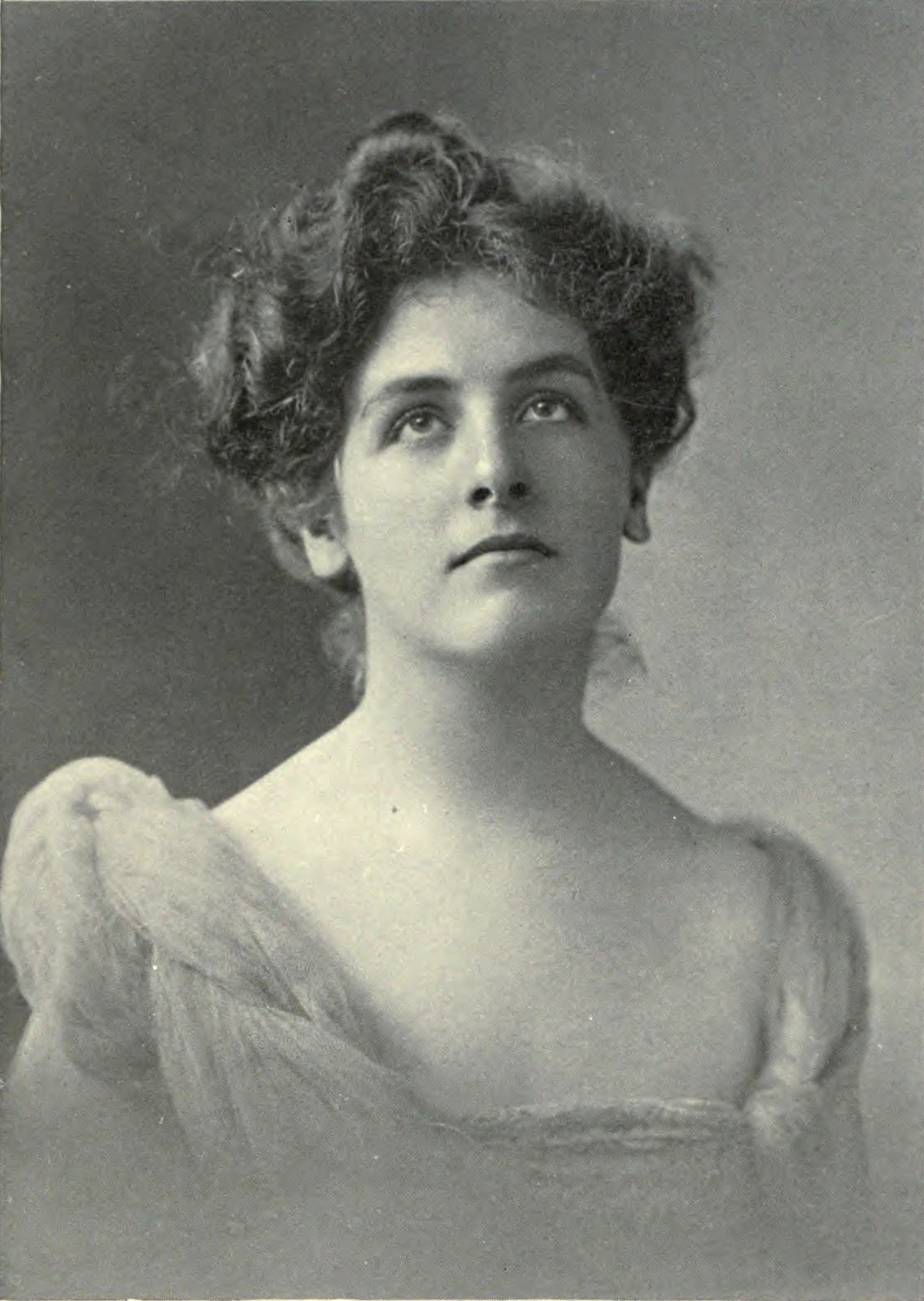
- Seymour in 1901
- Born: 1883
- Died: October 5, 1967 (aged 83–84); New York City, US
- Occupations: Actress; curator
- Years active: 1903-1967
- Spouse: William Stanley Eckert
- Children: Anne Seymour
- Relatives: E. L. Davenport (grandfather), Fanny Vining Davenport (grandmother), Fanny Davenport (aunt), Harry Davenport (uncle)

May Davenport Seymour Eckert (1883 – October 5, 1967) was an American stage actress descended from a long line of famous actors and later a patron of the arts scene in New York. She was the daughter of actor and stage manager William Gorman Seymour and actress May Marian Caroline Davenport. She had three siblings. Her maternal grandparents were E. L. Davenport and Fanny Vining Davenport, two mid-19th century actors. Her mother, May Marian, was a sister of famous 19th-century actress Fanny Davenport and Hollywood actor Harry Davenport. May Eckert married William Stanley Eckert in 1908; one of their children was actress Anne Seymour.

May Seymour began her theater career c.1901. In 1903, she was appearing in The Little Princess on Broadway. Other Broadway plays were The Lady of Lyons, The Triumph of Love, The Ruling Power, Brother Jacques, Beauty and the Barge and The Marriage of William Ashe. In 1905, she appeared in A Doll's House, produced by Charles Frohman and starring Ethel Barrymore. She appeared in the double-bill 1905 Frohman presentation Pantaloon/Alice Sit-by-the-Fire, which between the two plays featured all three Barrymore siblings: Ethel, Lionel and Jack.

After her children became adults, she appeared with daughter Anne for nine years on radio in a program called Against the Storm. She also became involved with the Museum of the City of New York, creating a theater collection of memorabilia and becoming its curator.

Eckert died in New York on October 5, 1967.
