= Harry Davenport (actor) =

American actor (1866–1949)

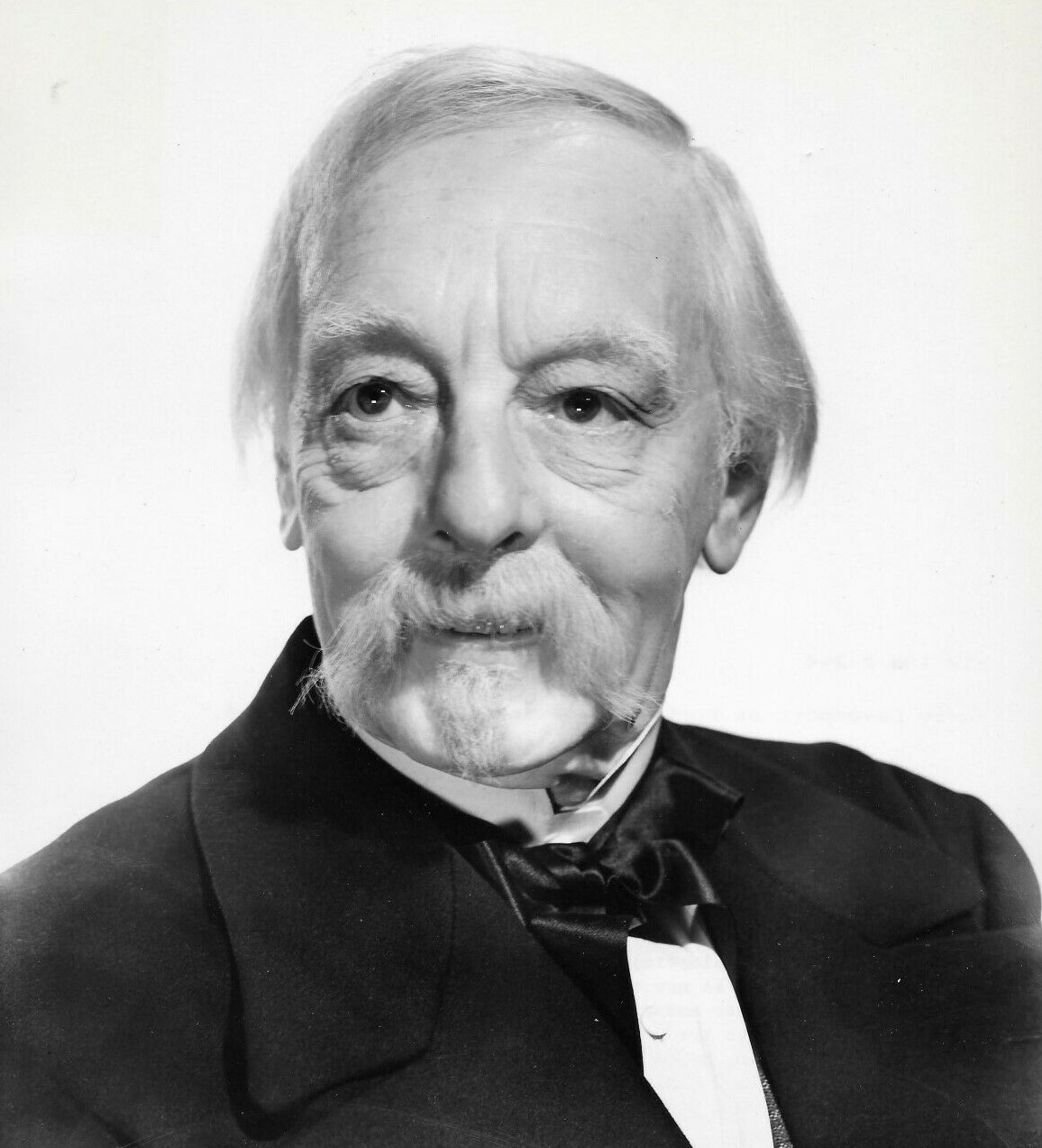
- Davenport as Dr. Meade in Gone with the Wind (1939)
- Born: Harold George Bryant Davenport; January 19, 1866; Roxbury, Boston, U.S.
- Died: August 9, 1949 (aged 83); Los Angeles, California, U.S.
- Resting place: Kensico Cemetery, Westchester County, New York City
- Occupation: Actor
- Years active: 1871–1949
- Spouses: Alice Shepphard (m. 1893; div. 1896) Phyllis Rankin (m. 1901; died 1934)
- Children: 4, including Dorothy Davenport
- Parents: Edward Loomis Davenport (father); Fanny Vining Davenport (mother)
- Relatives: Fanny Davenport (sister); May Davenport Seymour (niece); Arthur Rankin (step-son); Anne Seymour (great niece)

Harold George Bryant Davenport (January 19, 1866 – August 9, 1949) was an American film and stage actor who worked in show business from the age of six until his death. After a long and prolific Broadway career, he came to Hollywood in the 1930s, where he often played grandfathers, judges, doctors, and ministers. His roles include Dr. Meade in Gone with the Wind (1939) and Grandpa in Meet Me in St. Louis (1944). Bette Davis once called Davenport "without a doubt [. . .] the greatest character actor of all time."

== Early life ==
Davenport was born January 19, 1866, in Boston. He came from a long line of stage actors; his father was thespian Edward Loomis Davenport and his mother, Fanny Vining Davenport, was an English actress and a descendant of the renowned 18th-century Irish stage actor Jack Johnson. His sister was actress Fanny Davenport.

== Career ==
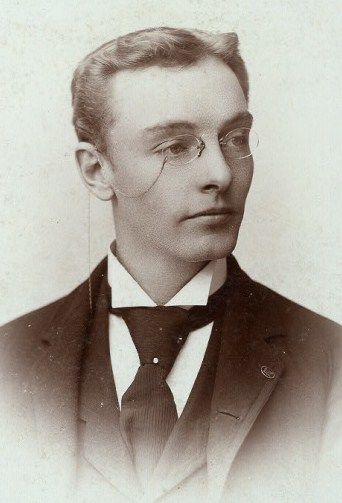
Harry Davenport (ca. 1895)

He made his stage debut — at the third Chestnut Street Theatre in Philadelphia — at the age of five in the play Damon and Pythias. Davenport made his Broadway debut in The Voyage of Suzette (1894) and appeared there in numerous plays.

=== Film career ===
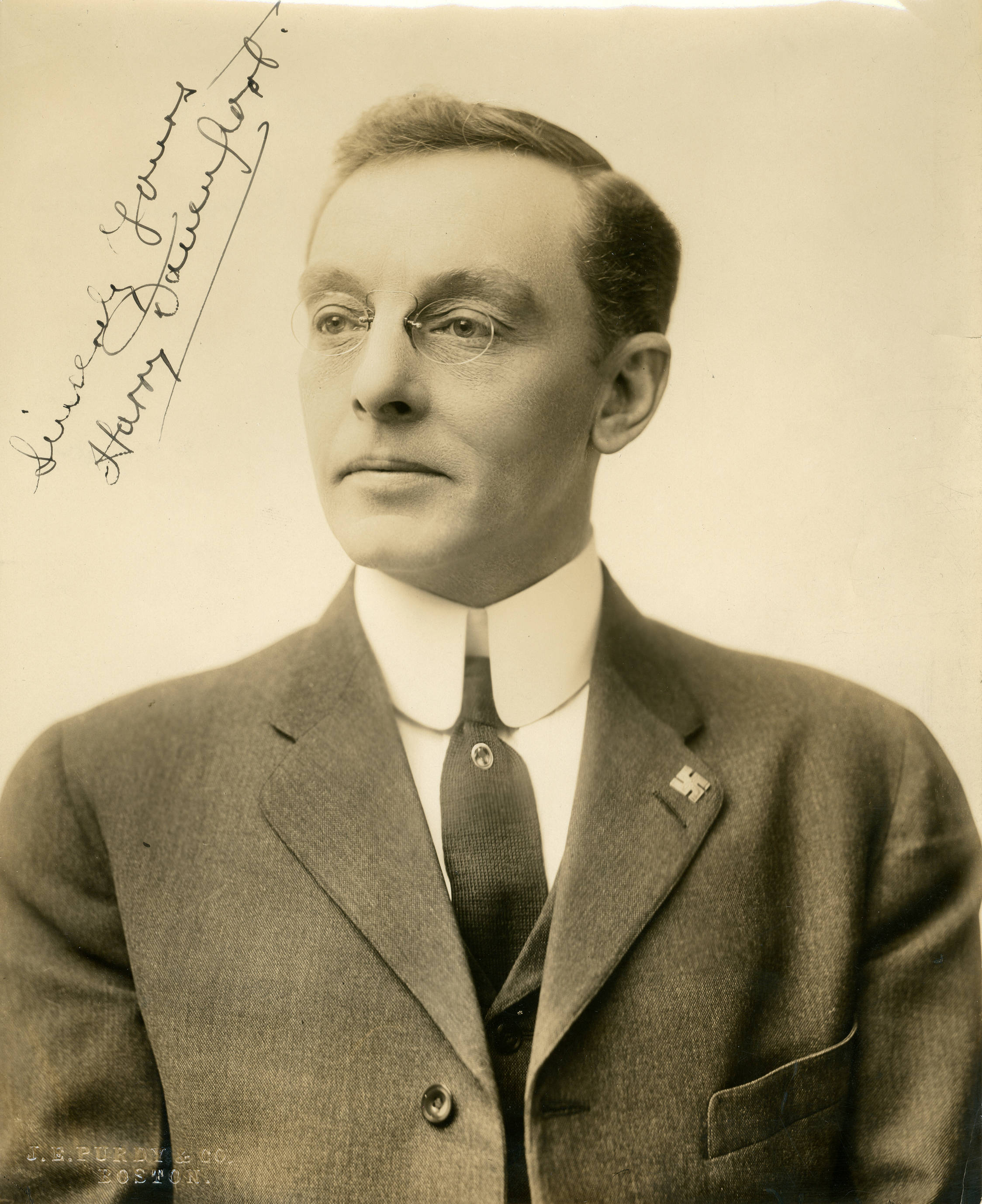
Davenport in 1911

Harry Davenport was one of the best-known and busiest "old men" in Hollywood films during the 1930s and 1940s. He started his film career at the age of 47, debuting in the 1913 silent short film Kenton's Heir. The next year, he starred in Fogg's Millions co-starring Rose Tapley. The film became the first in a series of silent comedy shorts. In addition, he also directed some silent features and many shorts between 1915 and 1917, including many of the films in the Mr. and Mrs. Jarr series.

Harry Davenport played Dr. Meade in Gone with the Wind (1939). Some of his other film roles are a lone resident in a ghost town in The Bride Came C.O.D. (1941), filmed on location in Death Valley, and the aged Louis XI of France in The Hunchback of Notre Dame (1939) with Charles Laughton, Maureen O'Hara and Cedric Hardwicke. He also had supporting roles in Alfred Hitchcock's thriller Foreign Correspondent (1940), William A. Wellman's western The Ox-Bow Incident (1943) and in Kings Row (1943) with Ronald Reagan. Davenport also played the grandfather of Judy Garland in Vincente Minnelli's classic Meet Me in St. Louis (1944) and the great-uncle of Myrna Loy and Shirley Temple in The Bachelor and the Bobby-Soxer (1947). His last film, Frank Capra's Riding High (1950), was released after his death.

Harry Davenport appeared in over 160 films. Asked why he made so many films at his age, he replied:

I hate to see men of my age sit down as if their lives were ended and accept a dole. An old man must show that he knows his job and is no loafer. If he can do that, they can take their pension money and buy daisies with it.

== Actors' Equity Association ==
In 1913, he co-founded, along with actor Eddie Foy, the Actors' Equity Association, an American labor union for actors. The original organization, known as the White Rats, was spearheaded by Davenport. After a nine-month stretch, the actors' group united in defiance of the appalling treatment of actors by theater owners such as the Shubert family and David Belasco, among others, by refusing to appear on stage by striking. The actions of the association caused the closure of all the theatres on Broadway, the only exception being theaters owned by George M. Cohan's company.

== Personal life ==
He and his wife Alice were wed in 1893. They had one daughter, Dorothy Davenport, who also became an actress. After divorcing Alice in 1896, he married actress Phyllis Rankin in 1901. They had two biological children: Edward 'Ned,' and Ethel Ann, who became actors. Harry also adopted Phyllis's two children from her previous marriage, Arthur Rankin and Catherine 'Kate.' Actress Anne Seymour and her brother, radio personality Bill Seymour, were Harry Davenport's great-niece and great-nephew by their mother, May Davenport.

Through his marriage to Phyllis, Davenport was the brother-in-law of Lionel Barrymore, who at the time was married to Phyllis' sister Doris. Phyllis's father, McKee Rankin, had been the top actor at the Arch Street Theater, which was run by Lionel's grandmother and Sidney's mother, Louisa Lane Drew. Davenport was the grandfather of producer Dirk Wayne Summers, Arthur Rankin Jr., and Wallace Reid Jr.

After Phyllis's death, Davenport moved to Los Angeles and lived with his now-grown children. He died of a sudden heart attack at age 83, one hour after he asked his agent Walter Herzbrun about a new film role. He was buried in Kensico Cemetery, Westchester County, New York. In the obituary, a newspaper called him the "white-haired character actor" with "the longest acting career in American history".

== Filmography ==
=== Actor ===
- Kenton's Heir (1913, Short) as The Doctor
- Too Many Husbands (1914, Short) as Dr. Crane
- The Accomplished Mrs. Thompson (1914, Short)
- Fogg's Millions (1914, Short)
- Rainy, the Lion Killer (1914, Short) as Jack Brown
- The Professional Scapegoat (1914, Short) as The Lawyer
- Damon and Pythias (1914) as Phillistus
- C.O.D. (1914) as C.O. Darlington
- The Jarr Family Discovers Harlem (1915, Short) as Mr. Jarr
- Mr. Jarr Brings Home a Turkey (1915, Short) as Mr. Jarr
- Mr. Jarr and the Lady Reformer (1915, Short) as Mr. Jarr
- Mr. Jarr Takes a Night Off (1915, Short) as Mr. Jarr
- Mr. Jarr's Magnetic Friend (1915, Short) as Mr. Jarr
- The Closing of the Circuit (1915, Short) as Mary's Father
- The Jarrs Visit Arcadia (1915, Short) as Mr. Jarr
- Mr. Jarr and the Dachshund (1915, Short) as Mr. Jarr
- Mr. Jarr Visits His Home Town (1915, Short) as Mr. Jarr
- Mrs. Jarr's Auction Bridge (1915, Short) as Mr. Jarr
- Mrs. Jarr and the Beauty Treatment (1915, Short) as Mr. Jarr
- Mr. Jarr and the Ladies' Cup (1915, Short) as Mr. Jarr
- Philanthropic Tommy (1915, Short) as Mr. Moreland
- Mr. Jarr and Love's Young Dream (1915, Short) as Mr. Jarr
- Mr. Jarr and the Captive Maid (1915, Short) as Mr. Jarr
- Mr. Jarr and Gertrude's Beaux (1915, Short) as Mr. Jarr
- Mr. Jarr's Big Vacation (1915, Short) as Mr. Jarr
- Mr. Jarr and Circumstantial Evidence (1915, Short) as Mr. Jarr
- Mr. Jarr and the Visiting Firemen (1915, Short) as Mr. Jarr
- Mrs. Jarr and the Society Circus (1915, Short) as Mr. Jarr
- Father and the Boys (1915) as Tobias Ford
- One Night (1916)
- Fashion and Fury (1916, Short) as The Gardener
- O'Hagan's Scoop (1916, Short) as The City Editor
- The Wheel of the Law (1916) as John Daniels
- The Father of Her Child (1916, Short) as Farmer Gray
- The Heart of a Fool (1916, Short) as Abe Peters, aka Gash
- Sowers and Reapers (1917) as Henry Ainsworth
- The Planter (1917) as Short
- The Unknown Quantity (1919) as Septimus Kinsolving
- A Girl at Bay (1919) as Frank Galt
- Among Those Present (1921, Short) (uncredited)
- My Sin (1931) as Roger Metcalf
- His Woman (1931) as Customs Inspector (uncredited)
- The Wiser Sex (1932) as Rolfe's Defense Attorney (uncredited)
- Get That Venus (1933) as Mr. Rendleby
- The Scoundrel (1935) as Slezack
- The Case of the Black Cat (1936) as Peter Laxter
- Legion of Terror (1936) as Senator Morton (uncredited)
- Three Men on a Horse (1936) as Williams
- Four Days' Wonder (1936) as Ticket Agent
- King of Hockey (1936) as Tom McKenna
- Under Cover of Night (1937) as Dr. Reed
- Paradise Express (1937) as Jed Carson
- Her Husband's Secretary (1937) as Dan Kingdon
- Maytime (1937) as Opera Director (uncredited)
- As Good as Married (1937) as Jessup
- Armored Car (1937) as Pop Logan
- Fly-Away Baby (1937) as Colonel Higgam
- They Won't Forget (1937) as Confederate Soldier
- White Bondage (1937) as Pop Craig
- The Life of Emile Zola (1937) as Chief of Staff
- Mr. Dodd Takes the Air (1937) as Doc Jeremiah George Quinn
- Fit for a King (1937) as Archduke Julio
- Radio Patrol (1937, Serial) as John P. Adams
- The Perfect Specimen (1937) as Carl Carter
- The Great Garrick (1937) as Innkeeper of Turk's Head (uncredited)
- First Lady (1937) as Charles
- Wells Fargo (1937) as Ingalls - Banker
- Man-Proof (1938) as Hitch-Hiking Old Man (uncredited)
- Gold Is Where You Find It (1938) as Dr. Parsons
- Reckless Living (1938) as 'General' Jeff
- The First Hundred Years (1938) as Uncle Dawson
- The Higgins Family (1938) as Grandpa William Jordan
- The Rage of Paris (1938) as Pop - the Caretaker
- Young Fugitives (1938) as Joel Bentham
- Marie Antoinette (1938) as Monsieur de Cosse (uncredited)
- You Can't Take It with You (1938) as Night Court Judge
- The Sisters (1938) as Doc Moore
- The Cowboy and the Lady (1938) as Uncle Hannibal Smith
- Orphans of the Street (1938) as Doc Will Ramsey
- Saleslady (1938) as Miles Cannon
- Long Shot (1939) as Henry Sharon
- Made for Each Other (1939) as Dr. Healy (uncredited)
- Tail Spin (1939) as T.P. Lester
- The Story of Alexander Graham Bell (1939) as Judge Rider
- Juarez (1939) as Dr. Samuel Basch
- My Wife's Relatives (1939) as Grandpa Ed Carson
- Exile Express (1939) as Dr. Hite
- Should Husbands Work? (1939) as Grandpa Higgins
- Death of a Champion (1939) as Guy Lanyard
- The Covered Trailer (1939) as Grandpa Ed Carson
- Gone with the Wind (1939) as Dr. Meade
- The Hunchback of Notre Dame (1939) as King Louis XI
- Money to Burn (1939) as Grandpa Ed Carson
- Dr. Ehrlich's Magic Bullet (1940) as Judge
- Granny Get Your Gun (1940) as Nate
- Too Many Husbands (1940) as George
- Grandpa Goes to Town (1940) as Grandpa
- All This, and Heaven Too (1940) as Pierre
- Lucky Partners (1940) as Judge
- Foreign Correspondent (1940) as Mr. Powers
- Earl of Puddlestone (1940) as Grandpa Ed Carson
- I Want a Divorce (1940) as Grandpa Brokaw
- Meet John Doe (1941) as Former Bulletin Owner (uncredited)
- I Wanted Wings (1941) as 'Sandbags' Riley
- That Uncertain Feeling (1941) as Jone
- The Bride Came C.O.D. (1941) as "Pop" Tolliver
- Hurricane Smith (1941) as Robert Ingersoll Reed
- One Foot in Heaven (1941) as Elias Samson
- Son of Fury: The Story of Benjamin Blake (1942) as Amos Kidder
- Kings Row (1942) as Colonel Skeffington
- Larceny, Inc. (1942) as Homer Bigelow
- Ten Gentlemen from West Point (1942) as Bane
- Tales of Manhattan (1942) as Professor Lyons
- The Amazing Mrs. Holliday (1943) as Commodore Thomas Spencer Holliday
- Shantytown (1943) as 'Doc' Herndon
- The Ox-Bow Incident (1943) as Arthur Davies
- We've Never Been Licked (1943) as Pop Lambert
- Headin' for God's Country (1943) as Clem Adams
- Princess O'Rourke (1943) as Supreme Court Judge
- Gangway for Tomorrow (1943) as Fred Taylor
- Government Girl (1943) as Senator MacVickers
- Jack London (1943) as Prof. Hilliard
- December 7th (1943) as Mr. 'C'
- Kismet (1944) as Agha
- The Impatient Years (1944) as Minister
- Meet Me in St. Louis (1944) as Grandpa
- Music for Millions (1944) as Doctor
- The Thin Man Goes Home (1945) as Dr. Bertram Charles
- This Love of Ours (1945) as Dr. Wilkerson
- She Wouldn't Say Yes (1945) as Albert
- Too Young to Know (1945) as Judge Boller
- The Enchanted Forest (1945) as Old John
- Pardon My Past (1945) as Grandpa Pemberton
- Adventure (1945) as Dr. Ashlon
- Claudia and David (1946) as Dr. Harry
- Courage of Lassie (1946) as Judge Payson
- G.I. War Brides (1946) as Grandpa Giles
- Faithful in My Fashion (1946) as Great Grandpa
- Three Wise Fools (1946) as The Ancient
- Lady Luck (1946) as Judge Martin
- A Boy and His Dog (1946, Short) as Squire Jim Kirby
- The Farmer's Daughter (1947) as Dr. Matthew Sulven
- Stallion Road (1947) as Dr. Stevens
- Keeper of the Bees (1947) as Michael Worthington
- The Bachelor and the Bobby-Soxer (1947) as Judge Thaddeus Turner
- That Hagen Girl (1947) as Judge Merrivale
- The Fabulous Texan (1947) as Rev. Baker
- Three Daring Daughters (1948) as Dr. Cannon
- The Man from Texas (1948) as 'Pop' Hickey
- That Lady in Ermine (1948) as Luigi
- For the Love of Mary (1948) as Justice Peabody
- The Decision of Christopher Blake (1948) as Courtroom Attendant
- Down to the Sea in Ships (1949) as Benjamin Harris
- Little Women (1949) as Dr. Barnes
- That Forsyte Woman (1949) as Old Jolyon Forsyte
- Tell It to the Judge (1949) as Judge MacKenzie Meredith
- Riding High (1950) as Johnson (final film)

=== Director ===
- The Island of Regeneration (1915)
- The Jarr Family Discovers Harlem (1915, Short)
- Mr. Jarr Brings Home a Turkey (1915, Short)
- Mr. Jarr and the Lady Reformer (1915, Short)
- The Enemies (1915, Short)
- Mr. Jarr Takes a Night Off (1915, Short)
- Mr. Jarr's Magnetic Friend (1915, Short)
- The Closing of the Circuit (1915, Short)
- The Jarrs Visit Arcadia (1915, Short)
- Mr. Jarr and the Dachshund (1915, Short)
- Mr. Jarr Visits His Home Town (1915, Short)
- Mrs. Jarr's Auction Bridge (1915, Short)
- Mrs. Jarr and the Beauty Treatment (1915, Short)
- Mr. Jarr and the Ladies' Cup (1915, Short)
- Philanthropic Tommy (1915, Short)
- Mr. Jarr and Love's Young Dream (1915, Short)
- Mr. Jarr and the Captive Maid (1915, Short)
- Mr. Jarr and Gertrude's Beaux (1915, Short)
- Mr. Jarr's Big Vacation (1915, Short)
- Mr. Jarr and Circumstantial Evidence (1915, Short)
- Mr. Jarr and the Visiting Firemen (1915, Short)
- Mrs. Jarr and the Society Circus (1915, Short)
- The Woman in the Box (1915, Short)
- The Making Over of Geoffrey Manning (1915)
- For a Woman's Fair Name (1916)
- The Supreme Temptation (1916)
- Myrtle the Manicurist (1916, Short)
- The Rookie (1916, Short)
- The Resurrection of Hollis (1916, Short)
- O'Hagan's Scoop (1916, Short)
- Carew and Son (1916, Short)
- Letitia (1916, Short)
- The Heart of a Fool (1916, Short)
- A Woman Alone (1917)
- Tillie Wakes Up (1917)
- The Millionaire's Double (1917)
- The False Friend (1917)
- A Son of the Hills (1917)
- A Man's Law (1917)
