= Adela Rogers St. Johns =

American writer (1894–1988)

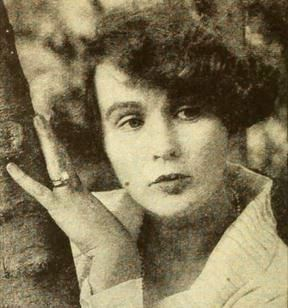
- St. Johns in 1922
- Born: Adela Nora Rogers; May 20, 1894; Los Angeles, California, U.S.
- Died: August 10, 1988 (aged 94); Arroyo Grande, California, U.S.
- Resting place: Forest Lawn Memorial Park, Glendale
- Education: Hollywood High School
- Occupations: Journalist; novelist; screenwriter
- Years active: 1912–1982
- Spouses: Ivan St. Johns (m. 1914; div. 1927) Richard Hyland (m. 1928; div. 1934) F. Patrick O'Toole (m. 1936; div. 1942)
- Children: 4
- Parent: Earl Rogers

Adela Nora Rogers St. Johns (May 20, 1894 – August 10, 1988) was an American journalist, novelist, and screenwriter. She wrote a number of screenplays for silent movies, but is best remembered for her groundbreaking exploits as "The World's Greatest Girl Reporter" during the 1920s and 1930s and her celebrity interviews for Photoplay magazine.

== Early life ==
St. Johns was born in Los Angeles, the only daughter of Los Angeles criminal lawyer Earl Rogers (who was a friend of publishing magnate William Randolph Hearst) and his wife, Harriet Belle Greene. She attended Hollywood High School, graduating in 1910.

== Career ==
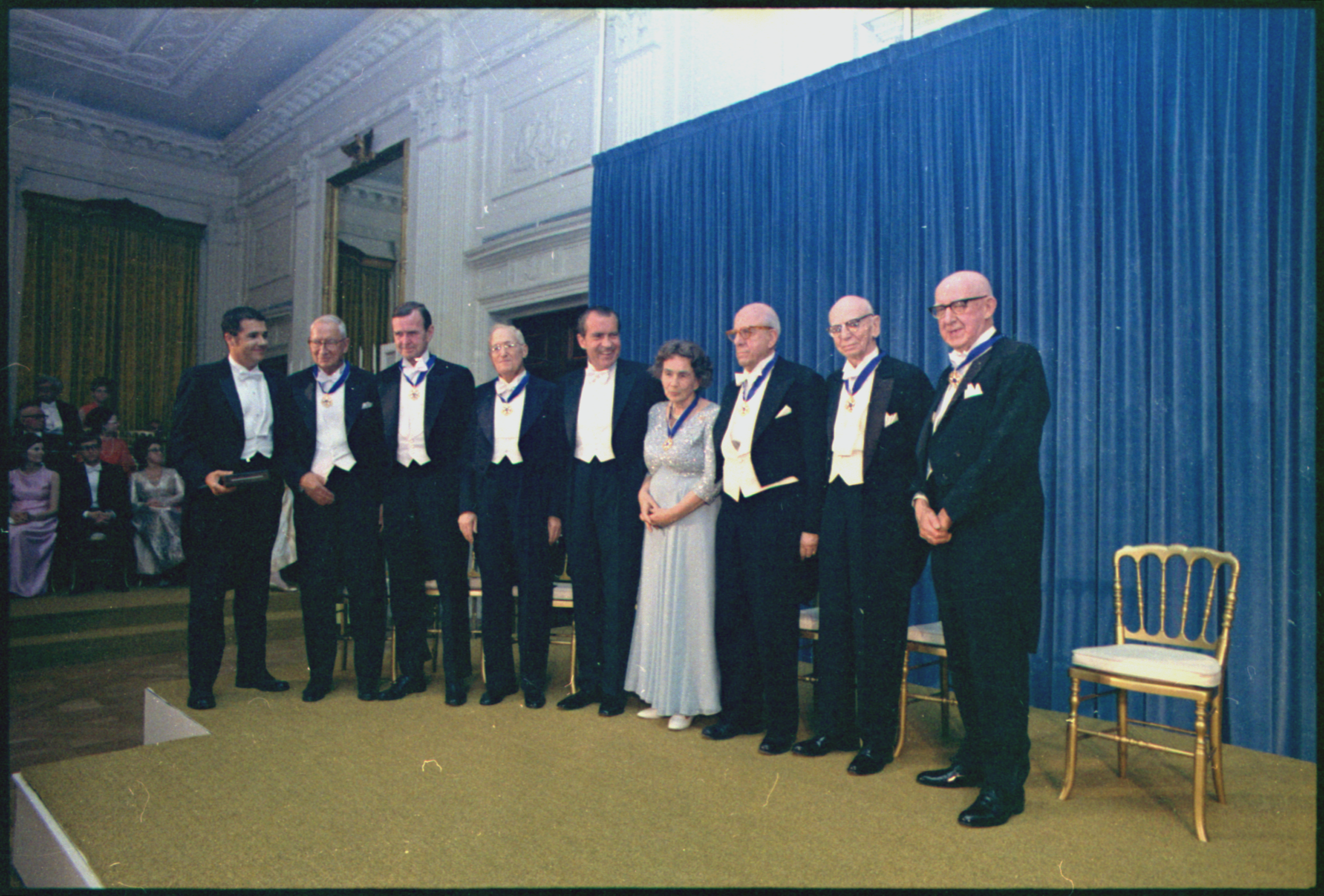
St. Johns accepted the Presidential Medal of Freedom from President Richard Nixon on April 22, 1970.

She obtained her first job in 1912 working as a reporter for Hearst's San Francisco Examiner. She reported on crime, politics, society, and sports news before transferring to the Los Angeles Herald in 1913.

After seeing her work for that newspaper, James R. Quirk offered her a job writing for his new fan magazine Photoplay. St. Johns accepted the job so she could spend more time with her husband and children. Her celebrity interviews helped the magazine become a success through her numerous revealing interviews with Hollywood film stars. She also wrote short stories for Cosmopolitan, The Saturday Evening Post, and other magazines and finished 9 of her 13 screenplays before returning to reporting for Hearst newspapers.

Writing in a distinctive, emotional style, St. Johns reported on, among other subjects, the controversial Jack Dempsey–Gene Tunney "long-count" fight in 1927, the treatment of the poor during the Great Depression, and the 1935 trial of Bruno Richard Hauptmann for kidnapping and murdering the son of Charles Lindbergh.

In the mid-1930s, she moved to Washington, DC, to report on national politics for the Washington Herald. There, she became prominent among a group of female reporters working for Cissy Patterson. Her coverage of the assassination of Senator Huey Long in 1935, the abdication of King Edward VIII in 1936, the 1940 Democratic National Convention, and other major stories made her one of the best-known reporters of the day. St. Johns again left newspaper work in 1948 to write books and to teach journalism at the University of California, Los Angeles.

In 1962, she published Final Verdict, a biography of her father, Earl Rogers. The book was adapted for a TNT television film of the same name in 1991; Olivia Burnette portrayed the young St. Johns.

=== Later years ===
St. Johns was awarded the Presidential Medal of Freedom on April 22, 1970.

During the late 1960s and 1970s, St. Johns was a frequent guest on various talk shows, including both Jack Paar's and Johnny Carson's The Tonight Show and The Merv Griffin Show. During one Tonight Show visit, Paar noted that St. Johns had known many legends of Hollywood's Golden Age and was once rumored to have had Clark Gable's child. St. Johns quipped, "Well, who wouldn't have wanted to have Clark Gable's baby?" Paar inquired if there was anything she wanted to do that she had not yet done in her rather incredible life; St. Johns replied, "I just want to live long enough to see how it all turns out."

In 1976, at the age of 82, she returned to reporting for the Examiner to cover the bank robbery and conspiracy trial of Patty Hearst, granddaughter of her former employer. In the late 1970s, St. Johns hosted a miniseries chronicling Gable's films, which appeared on Iowa Public Television. Around the same time, she was interviewed for the television documentary series Hollywood: A Celebration of the American Silent Film (1980).

The following year, St. Johns appeared with other early 20th-century figures as one of the "witnesses" in Warren Beatty's Reds (1981). St. Johns spent her remaining years living in Arroyo Grande, California.

== Personal life ==
St. Johns was married three times and had four children. Her first marriage was to Los Angeles Herald chief copy editor William Ivan St. Johns, whom she married in 1914. They had two children, Elaine and William Ivan Jr., before divorcing in 1927. The following year, she married one-time Stanford University football star Richard Hyland. They had one son, Richard, and divorced in 1934. St. Johns' third marriage was to F. Patrick O'Toole, an airline executive. They married in 1936 and divorced in October 1942. After her third divorce, St. Johns adopted a son as a single parent.

== Death ==
On August 10, 1988, St. Johns died at the South County Convalescent Hospital in Arroyo Grande, at the age of 94. She is buried at Forest Lawn Memorial Park in Glendale, California.

== Bibliography ==
=== Books ===
- The Skyrocket (Cosmopolitan, 1925) [novel]
- A Free Soul (Cosmopolitan, 1927) [novel]
- The Single Standard (Cosmopolitan, 1928) [novel]
- Field of Honor (E.P. Dutton, 1938) [novel]
- The Root of All Evil (E.P. Dutton, 1940) [novel]
- Never Again, and Other Stories (Doubleday, 1949)
- How to Write a Story and Sell It (Doubleday, 1956)
- Affirmative Prayers in Action (Dodd, Mead, 1957)
- First Step up Toward Heaven: Hubert Eaton and Forest Lawn (Prentice-Hall, 1959)
- Final Verdict (Doubleday, 1962) [biography of her father, Earl Rogers]
- Tell No Man (Doubleday, 1966) [novel]
- The Honeycomb (Doubleday, 1969) [autobiography]
- Some are Born Great (Doubleday, 1974) [stories about great women the author had known]
- Love, Laughter, and Tears: My Hollywood Story (Doubleday, 1978) [memoir]
- No Good-byes: My Search into Life Beyond Death (McGraw-Hill, 1982)

=== Articles ===
- "Do You Have a Story to Tell?," The Writer, August 1953

== Filmography ==
=== Acting ===
- Reds (1981)

=== Screenplays ===
- Old Love for New (1918)
- Marked Cards (1918)
- The Secret Code (1918)
- Broken Laws (1924)
- Inez from Hollywood (The Worst Woman in Hollywood, 1924)
- Lady of the Night (1925)
- The Red Kimona (1925)
- The Skyrocket (1926) [source novel only, published 1925]
- The Wise Guy (1926)
- The Broncho Twister (1927)
- Children of Divorce (1927)
- Singed (1927)
- The Patent Leather Kid (1927)
- The Arizona Wildcat (1927)
- The Heart of a Follies Girl (1928)
- Lilac Time (1928)
- Scandal (1929)
- The Single Standard (1929) [source novel only, published 1928]
- A Free Soul (1931)
- What Price Hollywood? (1932)
- Miss Fane's Baby Is Stolen (1934)
- A Woman's Man (1934)
- A Star Is Born (1937, uncredited)
- Back in Circulation (1937)
- The Great Man's Lady (1942)
- Government Girl (1943)
- That Brennan Girl (1946)
- Smart Woman (1948)
- The Girl Who Had Everything (1953, based on her novel A Free Soul)

=== Teleplays ===
- General Electric Theater (Episode: "The Crime of Daphne Rutledge", 1954)
- Alfred Hitchcock Presents (Episode: "Never Again", 1955)
