= Edward Loomis Davenport =

American actor

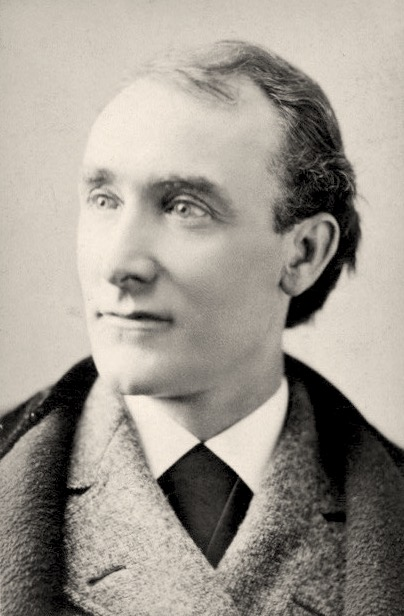
- Born: 1816; Boston
- Died: September 1, 1877; Canton, Pennsylvania
- Occupation: actor
- Spouse: Fanny Vining (m. 1849)
- Children: 9, including Fanny and Harry
- Relatives: May Davenport Seymour (granddaughter), Anne Seymour (great-granddaughter)

Edward Loomis Davenport (1816 – September 1, 1877) was an American actor.

== Life and career ==
Born in Boston, he made his first appearance on the stage in Providence, Rhode Island in support of Junius Brutus Booth. Afterwards he went to England, where he supported Mrs. Anna Cora Mowatt (Ritchie) (1819–1870), William Charles Macready and others.

In 1854 he was again in the United States, appearing in Shakespearian plays and in dramatizations of Dickens's novels. As Bill Sikes he was especially successful, and his Sir Giles Overreach, a role he played at Daly's Fifth Avenue Theatre in 1869, and Brutus were also greatly admired.

He died in Canton, Pennsylvania.

== Family ==
In 1849, he married Fanny Vining, an English actress. Their son Harry Davenport (1866–1949) and daughter Fanny Davenport (1850–1898) were also actors.
