= The Red Kimono =

1925 film

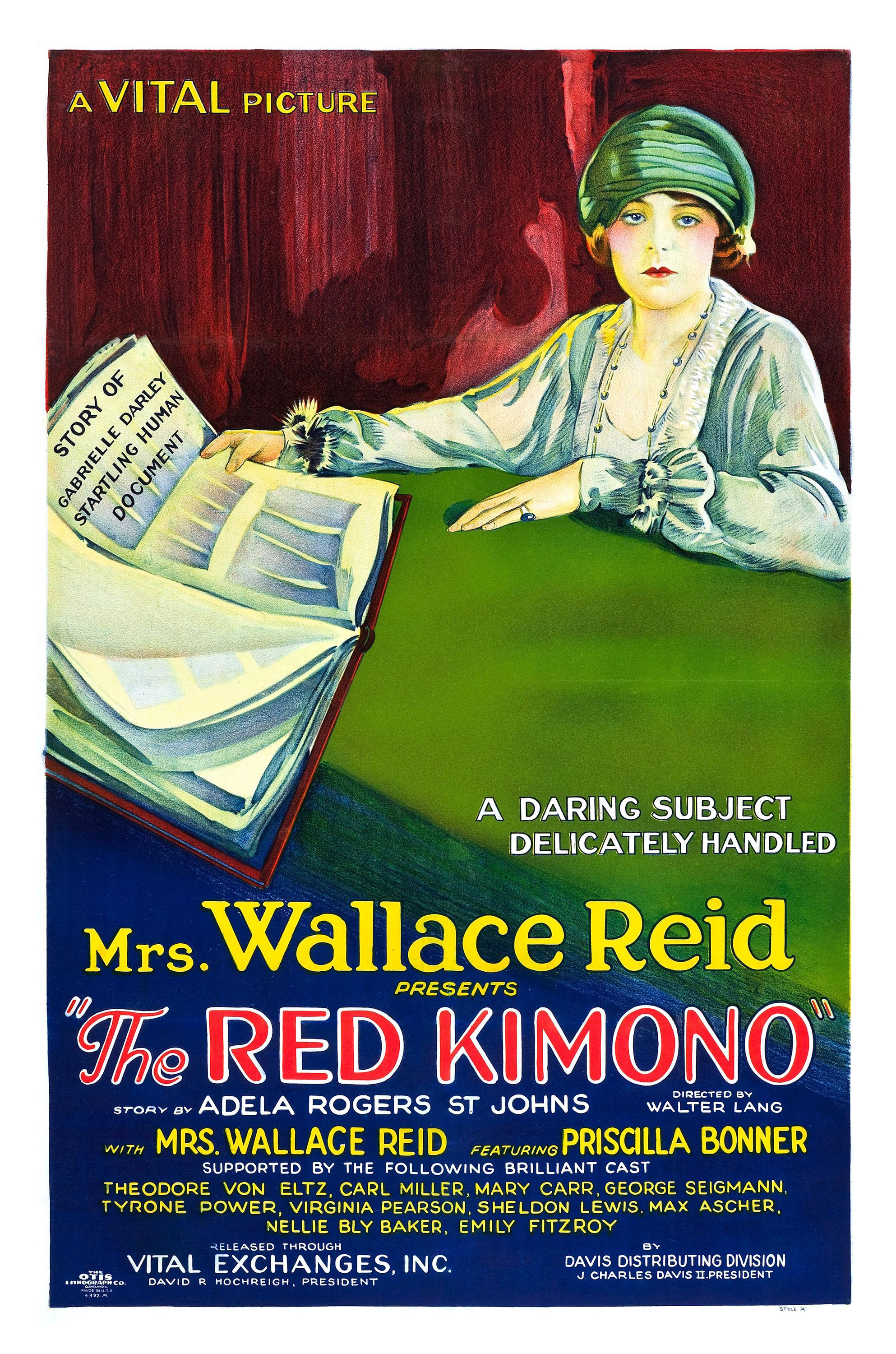
- Film poster
- Directed by: Walter Lang; Dorothy Davenport (uncredited)
- Written by: Adela Rogers St. Johns (story); Dorothy Arzner (adaptation); Malcolm Stuart Boylan (intertitles)
- Produced by: Dorothy Davenport (as Mrs. Wallace Reid)
- Starring: Priscilla Bonner; Carl Miller; Virginia Pearson; Tyrone Power Sr. Mary Carr
- Cinematography: James Diamond
- Production company: Mrs. Wallace Reid Productions
- Distributed by: Vital Exchanges Incorporated
- Release date: November 16, 1925
- Running time: 77 minutes (7 reels, 1,937 m (6,355 ft))
- Country: United States
- Language: Silent (English intertitles)

The Red Kimono (spelled as "The Red Kimona" in the opening credits) is a 1925 American silent drama film about prostitution produced by Dorothy Davenport (billed as Mrs. Wallace Reid) and starring Priscilla Bonner. It is the debut film of director Walter Lang.

The title comes from a red-colored dress shown through the film, meant to symbolize the main character's occupation as a "scarlet woman" (a prostitute).

== Plot ==
The full film

Producer Dorothy Davenport is seen consulting the files of a newspaper office. She wants to tell the audience a true story, that of Gabrielle Darley.

Gabrielle shoots Howard Blaine in the back as he is buying a wedding ring, then asks forgiveness and expresses her love to his corpse as she awaits arrest. At her trial she narrates her story. Blaine claimed he would marry her, and she went with him to New Orleans. He took her to a sleazy house. A mirror vision of herself in bridal attire gave way to a red dress, indicating she was entering prostitution. For love of Blaine, she spent several miserable years servicing men he sent.

The prosecutor suggests she shot Blaine in jealousy that he was going to marry another; she acknowledges this accusation and says he was buying the ring with money she earned. Women in the courtroom cry. The all-male jury finds her not guilty.

Beverly Fontaine, a society matron who gets publicity by helping reformed criminals, invites her to live at her house. There, she is displayed at parties for Beverly's friends and tormented by questions about her prostitution. Chauffeur Terrance O'Day takes her on a date to an amusement park. She realizes that there is a good kind of man she never has encountered.

Beverly tires of her and goes on a trip with Terrance driving, leaving Gabrielle to train as a nurse. The superintendent recognizes her and throws her out. She loses her job as a maid when she gets upset at seeing her defense attorney's wife wearing the ring she had had to give him as her fee. Starving and desperate, she telegraphs her friend Clara in the brothel in New Orleans to send her the train fare to return.

The telegraph operator, a friend of Terrance, tells him of her plan. Terrance commandeers Beverly's car to drive to the train station to stop Gabrielle, but he is too late. He catches the next train. In New Orleans, he takes a taxi to the address on the telegram. Meanwhile, Gabrielle has been attacked by a brute and hit by a car as she runs from him. Terrance sees the accident without realizing it is Gabrielle. Hearing from Clara that she has not arrived yet, he hangs around the street looking for her for days.

Recovering in hospital, Gabrielle hears that, due the flu pandemic and U.S. entering World War I, they desperately need nurses and helpers. She is hired. She is scrubbing the hospital floor when Terrance enters in uniform, having enlisted as an ambulance driver. He asks her to marry him before he goes overseas. She declares her love but postpones their marriage until he comes back and she has worked longer and become worthy of a happy life with him.

Narrator Davenport concludes that this positive outcome was attained for these two. However, Gabrielle is only one of many women in similar, terrible positions, and it is up to all women to help their unfortunate sisters.

== Cast ==
- Priscilla Bonner as Gabrielle Darley
- Nellie Bly Baker as Clara Johnson, Gabrielle's neighbor
- Carl Miller as Howard Blaine
- Mary Carr as prison matron
- Virginia Pearson as Mrs. Beverly Fontaine
- Tyrone Power Sr. as Gabrielle's father
- Sheldon Lewis as district attorney
- Theodore von Eltz as Terrance O'Day or Freddy, the chauffeur
- Emily Fitzroy as the housekeeper
- George Siegmann as Mr. Mack, a client
- Dot Farley as inquisitive woman
- Max Asher as H.E. Reid, a jeweler
- Dorothy Davenport as woman narrating the story (unbilled)
- Ellinor Vanderveer as woman with defense attorney's wife
- Lottie Williams as crying woman in rag clothes in courtroom

== Production ==
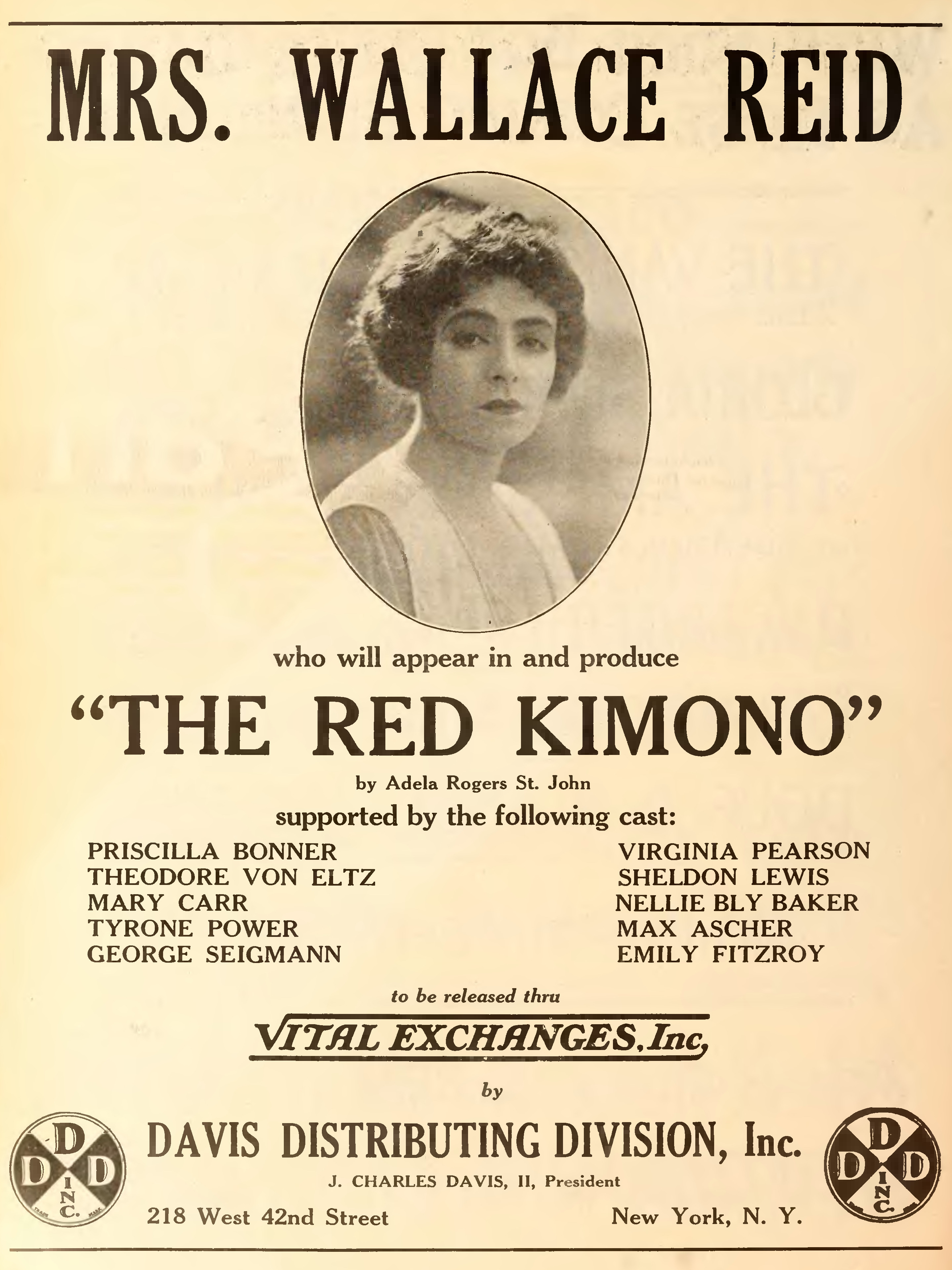
The Red Kimono advertisement in Motion Picture News, 1925

The film is notable today for being one of the few independent productions produced and written by women. This is the third of Davenport's "social conscience" releases, preceded by Human Wreckage (1923) on the topic of drug addiction (released five months after Wallace Reid's death from morphine), and Broken Laws (1924) about excessive mother-love.

The film is based on a real case of prostitution that took place in New Orleans in 1917. This film, billing itself as a true story, used the real name of the woman played by Priscilla Bonner, and as a consequence, the woman sued producer Dorothy Davenport and won. The case, Melvin v Reid, has been cited recently in the emerging "right to be forgotten" cases around the world as an early example of one's right to leave a past one wishes to forget. In the ruling of the California Appellate Court (Melvin v. Reid, 112 Cal.App. 285, 297 P. 91 (1931)) the court stated "any person living a life of rectitude has that right to happiness which includes a freedom from unnecessary attacks on his character, social standing or reputation."

As with Davenport's earlier Human Wreckage in 1924, the film was banned in the United Kingdom by the British Board of Film Censors in 1926. In the 1920s, the film was banned in Chicago.

== Preservation status ==
A copy of the film is preserved at the Library of Congress. A DVD edition was released in the early 2000s.
