= The Girl and the Crisis =

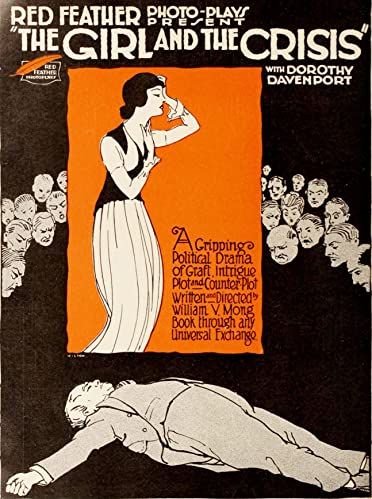
- Directed by: William V. Mong
- Written by: William V. Mong
- Starring: Dorothy Davenport; Charles Perley; Harry Holden
- Cinematography: Gus Peterson
- Production company: Universal Pictures
- Distributed by: Universal Pictures
- Release date: February 26, 1917
- Running time: 50 minutes
- Country: United States
- Languages: Silent; English intertitles

The Girl and the Crisis is a 1917 American silent drama film directed by William V. Mong and starring Dorothy Davenport, Charles Perley and Harry Holden.

== Plot ==
The film opens with a chance encounter between a pickpocket and Ellen Wilmot, a society woman. Lieutenant-Governor Oliver Barnitz intervenes, returning Ellen's stolen purse, and their friendship begins to blossom.

The central conflict revolves around Jacob Wilmot, Ellen's father and president of the Wilmot Reservoir Company, who is overseeing the construction of a reservoir to irrigate vast expanses of land. However, not all citizens of Old Town, an area condemned for the reservoir project, are satisfied with the compensation offered for their land. A riot ensues, driven by discontent and orchestrated by Jere Yaukey and his group of grafters.

David Houston, a peace-loving citizen, warns Wilmot about the impending violent resistance and blackmail threats from the grafters who stand to profit from the project. Fearing the loss of millions, the grafters incite a riot, with a large crowd led by Willis demanding better compensation. Poole, a resident of Old Town, attempts to mediate but faces aggression from the mob.

The situation escalates, and Ellen narrowly escapes danger when she drives to the reservoir. Wilmot, Houston, and Poole call for help, but rioters disrupt their efforts. Chaos erupts as dynamite is detonated, causing widespread damage.

Lieutenant-Governor Oliver Barnitz becomes involved when he senses trouble at the reservoir. Wilmot informs him about the crisis. The rioters, spotting Oliver, grow agitated. Logan is dispatched to warn the Governor. The group, comprising Oliver, Houston, Poole, and Ellen, rushes to the State House.

When they reach the Governor's office, they find that Yaukey has already spoken to the Governor, who hesitates to act immediately. Oliver voices his commitment to upholding the state's laws. Poole, deeply moved by these words, takes drastic action. He assassinates the Governor, who had refused to intervene promptly.

Six months later, Poole awaits execution, while Oliver is urged to pardon him. Meanwhile, Peter Barnitz, Oliver's father, asks Ellen to intercede on Poole's behalf. As the truth unfolds, it is revealed that Ellen's mother had married Peter Barnitz before marrying Jacob Wilmot. Peter's desperation to save Poole drives a series of tragic events, including a haunting dream in which he murders Wilmot.

== Cast ==
- Dorothy Davenport as Ellen Wilmot
- Charles Perley as Oliver Barnitz
- Harry Holden as Jacob Wilmot
- William V. Mong as The Honorable Peter Barnitz
- Alfred Hollingsworth as David Houston
- Forrest Seabury as John

== Bibliography ==
- Langman, Larry. American Film Cycles: The Silent Era. Greenwood Publishing, 1998.
