= Broken Laws =

1924 film by Roy William Neill

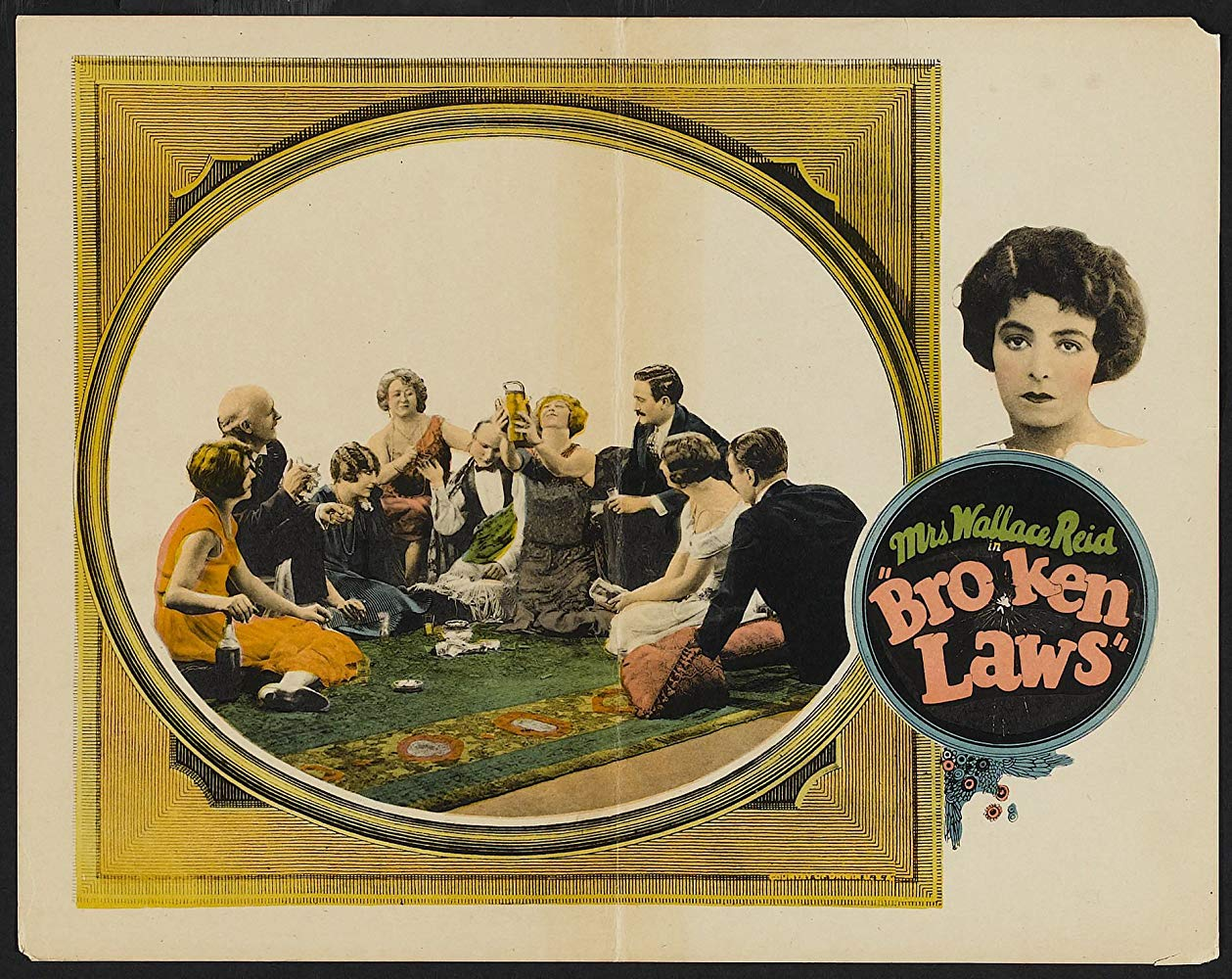
- Directed by: Roy William Neill
- Written by: Marion Jackson; Bradley King
- Based on: "Broken Laws" by Adela Rogers St. Johns
- Produced by: Dorothy Davenport; Thomas H. Ince
- Cinematography: James Diamond
- Production company: Thomas Ince Corporation
- Distributed by: Film Booking Office of America
- Release date: November 9, 1924
- Running time: 70 minutres
- Country: United States
- Language: Silent (English intertitles)

Broken Laws is a 1924 American silent drama film directed by Roy William Neill, remarkable for the appearance of Dorothy Davenport, who is billed as "Mrs. Wallace Reid".

Broken Laws, with its plot of parental overindulgence, is the second of Davenport's "social conscience" releases, to be followed by The Red Kimono (1925), based on a true-life story of white slavery.

== Plot ==
As described in a review in a film magazine, Christmas Eve finds Ralph Allen (Wallace) breaking the speed laws and eluding the police. In his car are his son Bobby (Moore) and Patsy Heath (Walsh), the daughter of a neighbor. The Allens go to a jazz party at the Heaths. Bobby has declared that there is no Santa Claus and has ruined the Christmas tree, climbs out of the house and goes to the Allens to watch the party. He and Patsy are trying to imitate the adults when they are discovered. Bobby is taken back home, and exposes himself to the rain for spite and becomes ill. When he recovers, his mother spoils him and he gets into trouble at school. When eighteen, his mother buys Bobby (Rankin) a car and he begins to lead a wild life, exerting a bad influence on Patsy (Corbin). Finally, his mother and Patsy's father (Marmont) go to rescue them from a questionable roadhouse. Speeding home, Bobby speeds and runs into a wagon, killing an old woman. He is tried and convicted of manslaughter. His mother realizes that she is also guilty as she indulged him and never taught him to respect the law or authority. Suddenly, she awakes and finds that the killing was just a dream. Calling Bobby to her room, she gives him a sound spanking and sends him back to school to apologize.

== Cast ==
- Dorothy Davenport as Joan Allen (credited as "Mrs. Wallace Reid")
- Percy Marmont as Richard Heath
- Ramsey Wallace as Ralph Allen
- Jackie Saunders as Muriel Heath (as Jacqueline Saunders)
- Arthur Rankin as Bobby Allen at 16
- Virginia Lee Corbin as Patsy Heath at age 16
- Pat Moore as Bobby Allen at age 8
- Jane Walsh as Patsy Heath at age 8 (as Jane Wray)
- Tommy Hicks as Fat kid
- Henry Neill as himself
- Dorothy Seay

== Production ==
Davenport's husband was the star Wallace Reid, who died of morphine addiction in January 1923. By June 1923, Davenport had co-produced, starred in and toured the country with Human Wreckage, a moralistic warning about the terrors of drug addiction. The film's sensational tone, and the roadshow engagement with her personal appearances, were a direct precursor to the later 1930s exploitation films of Kroger Babb and others.

== Preservation ==
According to the Silent Era website, a print exists in the Cinematheque Royale de Belgique.

== See also ==
- The Silver Cord (1933)
