= Fanny Davenport =

American actress (1850–1898)

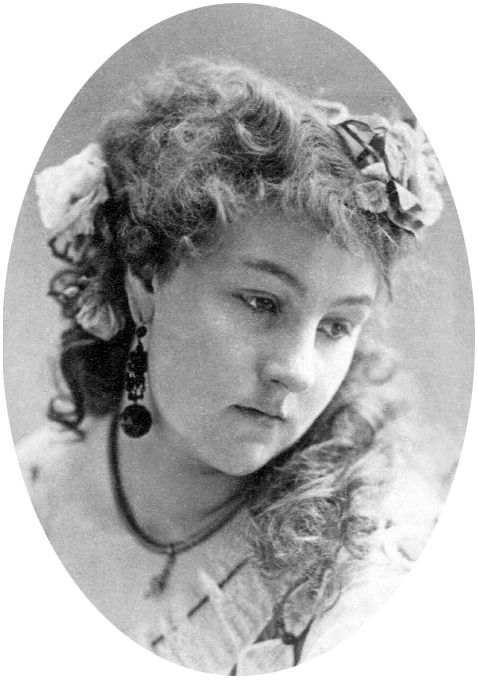
- Born: Fanny Lily Gipsey Davenport; April 10, 1850; London, England, U.K.
- Died: September 26, 1898 (aged 48); Duxbury, Massachusetts, U.S.
- Occupation: Stage actress
- Spouse(s): Edwin B. Price (m.1879–div.1888); Willet Melbourne MacDowell (m.1889)
- Parents: Edward Loomis Davenport (father); Fanny Vining Davenport (mother)
- Relatives: Harry Davenport (brother), May Davenport Seymour (niece)

Fanny Lily Gipsey Davenport (April 10, 1850 – September 26, 1898) was an American stage actress.

== Life ==
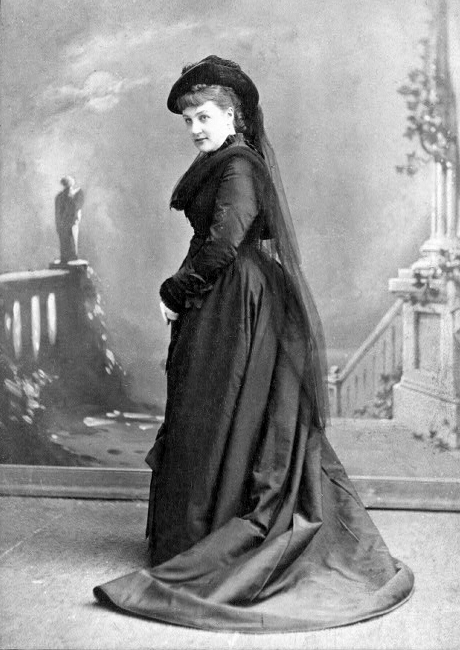
Fanny Davenport before joining the company of Augustin Daly in 1869

The eldest child of Edward Loomis Davenport and Fanny Elizabeth (Vining) Gill Davenport, Fanny Lily Gypsey Davenport was born on April 10, 1850, in London.

Most of her siblings were actors, including Harry Davenport. She was brought to the United States in 1854 and educated in the Boston public schools. At age 7, she appeared at Boston's Howard Athenæum as Metamora's child, but her real debut occurred in February 1862 when she portrayed King Charles in Faint Heart Never Won Fair Lady at Niblo's Garden.

From 1869 to 1877, she performed in Augustin Daly's company; and afterwards, with a company of her own, acted with particular success in Sardou's Fédora (1883) her leading man being Robert B. Mantell, Cleopatra (1890), and similar plays. She took over emotional Sardou roles that had been originated in Europe by Sarah Bernhardt. Her last appearance was at the Grand Opera House in Chicago on March 25, 1898, shortly before her death.

Her first husband was Edwin B. Price, an actor. They married on July 30, 1879, and divorced on June 8, 1888. On May 18, 1889, she married her leading man, Melbourne MacDowell. Both marriages were childless.

Davenport died September 26, 1898, from an enlarged heart, at her summer home in Duxbury, Massachusetts.
