= Anne Seymour (actress) =

American actress (1909–1988)

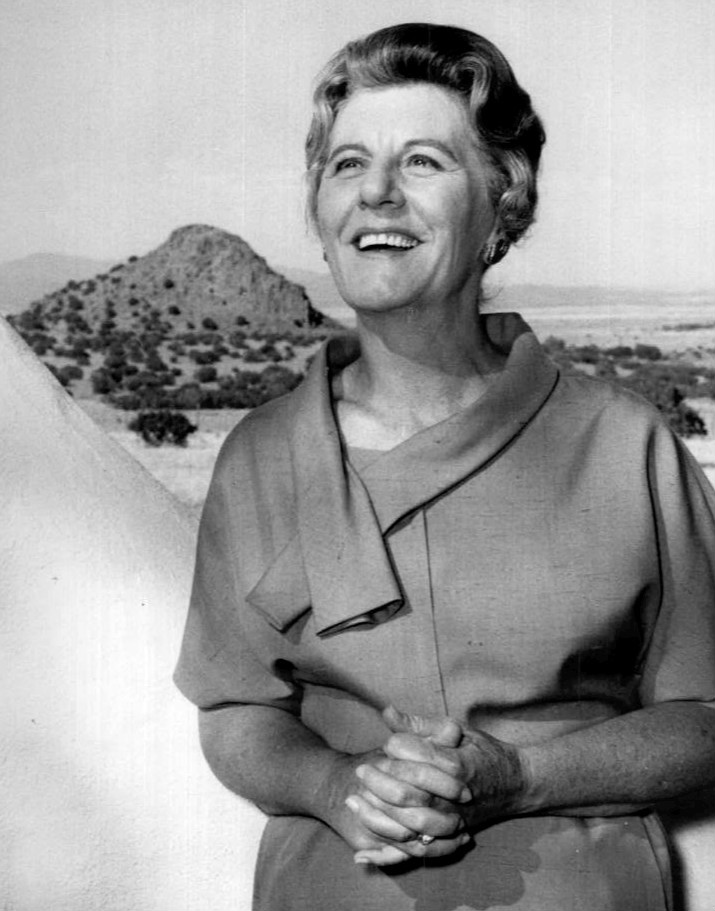
- Seymour as Lucia Garret in Empire in 1962.
- Born: Anne Seymour Eckert; September 11, 1909; New York City, U.S.
- Died: December 8, 1988 (aged 79); Los Angeles, California, U.S.
- Resting place: Westwood Village Memorial Park Cemetery
- Other names: Anne Eckert; Anne Seymour Eckert
- Occupation: Actor
- Years active: 1944–1988
- Mother: May Davenport Seymour Eckert
- Relatives: Harry Davenport (great uncle)

Anne Seymour Eckert (September 11, 1909 – December 8, 1988) was an American film and television character actress.

== Early life and education ==
Anne Seymour Eckert was born in Manhattan to William Stanley and May Davenport (née Seymour) Eckert, an actress and later curator of the Museum of the City of New York. She was the seventh generation of a theatrical family traceable to 18th century Ireland. Seymour, her mother, and her brother (Bill Seymour) were all active in radio concurrently.

Her great-uncle was character actor Harry Davenport, and her cousins were writer James Seymour and actor John Seymour.

After attending St. Mary's for "her conventional education", Seymour studied at the American Laboratory Theatre.

== Career ==
=== Stage ===
Seymour's first professional activity as an entertainer came with the Jitney Players, for which she earned $15 weekly.

She was in four Broadway productions. She played in At the Bottom and Puppet Show in 1930 and in The School for Scandal in 1931. Almost three decades later, she played Mrs. Sara Delano Roosevelt in Sunrise at Campobello.

=== Radio ===
Seymour debuted on radio in Cincinnati in 1932. According to the June 25, 1938, issue of WLS Radio's "Stand By" magazine, Seymour was living in the north side of Chicago. In the early 1940s, she played Prudence Dane, the leading female role in the "historic serial" A Woman of America and starred as Mary Marlin in The Story of Mary Marlin, both on NBC. She was also a member of the casts of Joyce Jordan, Girl Interne; Tom Bradley; Against the Storm; and King Arthur, Junior.

=== Television ===
Seymour's first venture in television was a three-month role in Follow Your Heart, an NBC soap opera. "I hated every minute of it," she said. In 1961, she starred opposite Ed Wynn, in the “Rawhide” episode “25 Santa Clauses.” She also "had a running part on a CBS soap opera called The First Hundred Years." She played Dean Morse in the episode "Terror on the Campus" of Peter Gunn in 1959. She played Mrs. Barr in season 1, episode 15 of My Three Sons in 1961. She later starred in Empire, a 1962–63 series set in the modern American West. Turning her talents to comedy, she was a regular on The Tim Conway Show in 1970.

She was a guest star on many American television series in the 1960s and 1970s. She appeared in two episodes of Perry Mason; in 1963 she played Hettie Randall in "The Case of the Festive Felon", and in 1964 she played Bonnie Mae Wilmet in "The Case of the Bullied Bowler". She portrayed Amelia Tarbell in Pollyanna (1960), and Miss Tilford in A Tree Grows in Brooklyn. In a 1965 episode of Hazel entitled "A 'Lot' to Remember", she played Laura Kirkland. In 1966, she was a guest star in season 3, episode 12 of Bewitched.

Seymour played Ms. Frost in "A Visit to Upright", a 1972 episode of Bonanza, as well as three different characters in four episodes of Gunsmoke: "Snow Train Parts 1 & 2", "The Wake", and "Kitty's Injury". In the spring of 1970, she was a regular cast member of the situation comedy The Tim Conway Show, playing airport and airline owner Mrs. K. J. Crawford during the show's 12-episode run. She guest-starred on Emergency! in the episodes "Foreign Trade" which first aired on November 16, 1974 (Season 4, Episode 9) and "Involvement" which first aired on January 24, 1976 (Season 5, Episode 17). She played the role of Millie Eastman, a retired head nurse of Rampart General who tried to commit suicide by overdosing on pills. During her recovery at Rampart, she is placed in a semi-private room with Jean Clark (Dawn Lyn), whom she starts mentoring for emotional support.

She played Esther in the episode "Final Escape" of Alfred Hitchcock Presents (1985).

=== Film ===
An early film appearance by Seymour was in All the King's Men (1949) as Mrs. Lucy Stark. She played the role of Grandma Beebe in the 1961 children's film classic Misty, a screen adaptation of Marguerite Henry's children's book, Misty of Chincoteague. Her last performance was in 1989, as Veda Ponikvar in the feature film Field of Dreams, which was released after her death.

== Death ==
Seymour died of heart failure in Los Angeles, on December 8, 1988, at the age of 79. She is interred in Westwood Village Memorial Park Cemetery.

== Radio appearances ==
Year	Program	Episode/source
1946	Inner Sanctum Mystery	No Rest for the Dead
1948	Quiet, Please	Green Light

== Film appearances ==
Year	Title	Role	Notes
1949	All the King's Men	Mrs. Lucy Stark	
1951	The Whistle at Eaton Falls	Mary London	
1957	Four Boys and a Gun	Mrs. Richards	
1957	Man on Fire	Judge Randolph	
1958	The Gift of Love	Miss McMasters	
1958	Desire Under the Elms	Eben's Mother	
1958	Handle with Care	Matilda Iler	
1960	Home from the Hill	Sarah Halstead	
1960	Pollyanna	Mrs. Amelia Tarbell	
1960	All the Fine Young Cannibals	Mrs. Bixby	
1960	The Subterraneans	Charlotte Percepied	
1961	Misty	Grandma Beebe	
1964	Stage to Thunder Rock	Myra Parker	
1964	Good Neighbor Sam	Irene	
1964	Where Love Has Gone	Dr. Sally Jennings	
1965	Mirage	Mrs. Frances Calvin	
1966	Blindfold	Smitty	
1966	Waco	Ma Jenner	
1967	How to Succeed in Business Without Really Trying	Gertrude Biggley	Uncredited
1967	Fitzwilly	Grimsby	
1968	Stay Away, Joe	Mrs. Hawkins	
1969	How to Commit Marriage	Molly - Baby's Nurse	Uncredited
1970	Gunsmoke	Sarah	Snow Train
1970	The Wacky Zoo of Morgan City	Maggie Hargrove	
1972	The Man	Ma Blore	
1973	So Long, Blue Boy	Martha	
1974	Seven Alone	Narrator (adult Catherine)	
1975	Gemini Affair	Agnes Wilson	
1975	Hearts of the West	Nietz' Housekeeper	Uncredited
1980	Never Never Land	Zena	
1983	Triumphs of a Man Called Horse	Elk Woman	
1984	Trancers	Chairman Ashe	
1988	Big Top Pee-wee	Pearl	
1989	Field of Dreams	Chisolm Newspaper Publisher	(final film role)
