= Manhattan Parade =

1931 film

- Directed by: Lloyd Bacon
- Written by: Houston Branch; Robert Lord based on the play by Samuel Shipman
- Starring: Winnie Lightner; Charles Butterworth; Joe Smith; Charles Dale
- Cinematography: Devereaux Jennings (Technicolor)
- Edited by: William Holmes
- Music by: Harold Arlen; Harry Ruby
- Production company: Warner Bros. Pictures
- Distributed by: Warner Bros. Pictures
- Release date: December 24, 1931
- Running time: 78 minutes
- Country: United States
- Language: English

Manhattan Parade is a 1931 American pre-Code musical comedy film photographed entirely in Technicolor. It was originally intended to be released in the United States early in 1931, but was shelved due to public apathy towards musicals. Despite waiting a number of months, the public proved obstinate and Warner Bros. Pictures reluctantly released the film in December 1931 after removing all the music. Since there was no such reaction to musicals outside the United States, the film was released there as a full musical comedy in 1931.

The film pokes fun at Al Jolson, who had suffered a downturn in his career due to the public aversion to musical pictures. He had been released from his contract to Warner Bros. late in 1930.

== Cast ==
- Winnie Lightner as Doris Roberts
- Charles Butterworth as Herbert T. Herbert
- Joe Smith as Lou Delman of the Avon Comedy Four (as Smith)
- Charles Dale as Jake Delman of the Avon Comedy Four (as Dale)
- Dickie Moore as Junior Roberts
- Bobby Watson as Paisley
- Frank Conroy as Bill Brighton
- Walter Miller as John Roberts
- Mae Madison as Woman in charge of fitting
- Polly Walters as Telephone girl
- Luis Alberni as Vassily Vassiloff
- Greta Granstedt as Charlotte Evans
- Lilian Bond as Sewing girl

=== Cast notes ===
- This was the first of two films which the comedy team of Smith and Dale starred in for Warner Bros., the second being The Heart of New York. The team failed to be the success which Warner Bros. had hoped for and their contract was not renewed.

== Production ==
The film was the first Warner Bros. film to be filmed in the improved Technicolor process which removed grain and improved both the color and clarity of the film. This improved process had first been used on The Runaround (1931) and resulted in an attempt at a color revival by the studios late in 1931.

== Music ==
Three songs were written for the film by Harold Arlen and Ted Koehler:

- "I Love a Parade" (Production Number sung by Chorus)
- "Temporarily Blue" (Sung by Winnie Lightner)
- "I'm Happy When You're Jealous" (Sung by Winnie Lightner). It was later recorded by Isham Jones and his Orchestra for Brunswick Records (Record Number 6204).

== Critical reception ==
Mordaunt Hall of the The New York Times wrote, "although it is an adaptation of a stray play by Samuel Shipman, [the film] has the earmarks of being a belated reply to the witty thrusts at the motion picture makers by Moss Hart and George S. Kaufman in their play, Once in a Lifetime. It is true that some of the episodes are laughable, but where the two playwrights employed the gimlet technique, the poking of fun at Broadway stage producers in this film is done for the most part in a bludgeoning fashion."

The Film Daily wrote that there "are some good laughs" and complimented the performances of Smith and Dale, Luis Alberni, Charles Butterworth and Bobby Watson. It commented, "Except that it invites unfavorable comparison with Once in a Lifetime on account of being labeled the film industry's reply to the stage play, this is not bad entertainment."

Variety gave a largely negative review in which they stated that Winnie Lightner was "badly miscast", and that a "few laughs dot the scenery of this musical and they're all the picture possesses in value." They commented positively about the color technique, while noting its imperfections, and wrote, "Artistically a neat job, but whether it adds to the subject other than from a novelty standpoint is doubtful. In one scene the tricky filter gave Smith and Dale's faces the appearance of a two days' growth of beard. Although on the whole the coloring is easy on the eye and never harsh or confusing as the early color pictures were."

== Preservation ==
Only a black and white copy of the cut print released in 1931 in the United States seems to have survived. A print is deposited at the Library of Congress. The complete film was released intact in countries outside the United States where a backlash against musicals never occurred. It is unknown whether a copy of this full version still exists.

== See also ==
- List of early color feature films
