= Swanee Shore =

"Swanee Shore: (a dreamy Southern waltz song)"
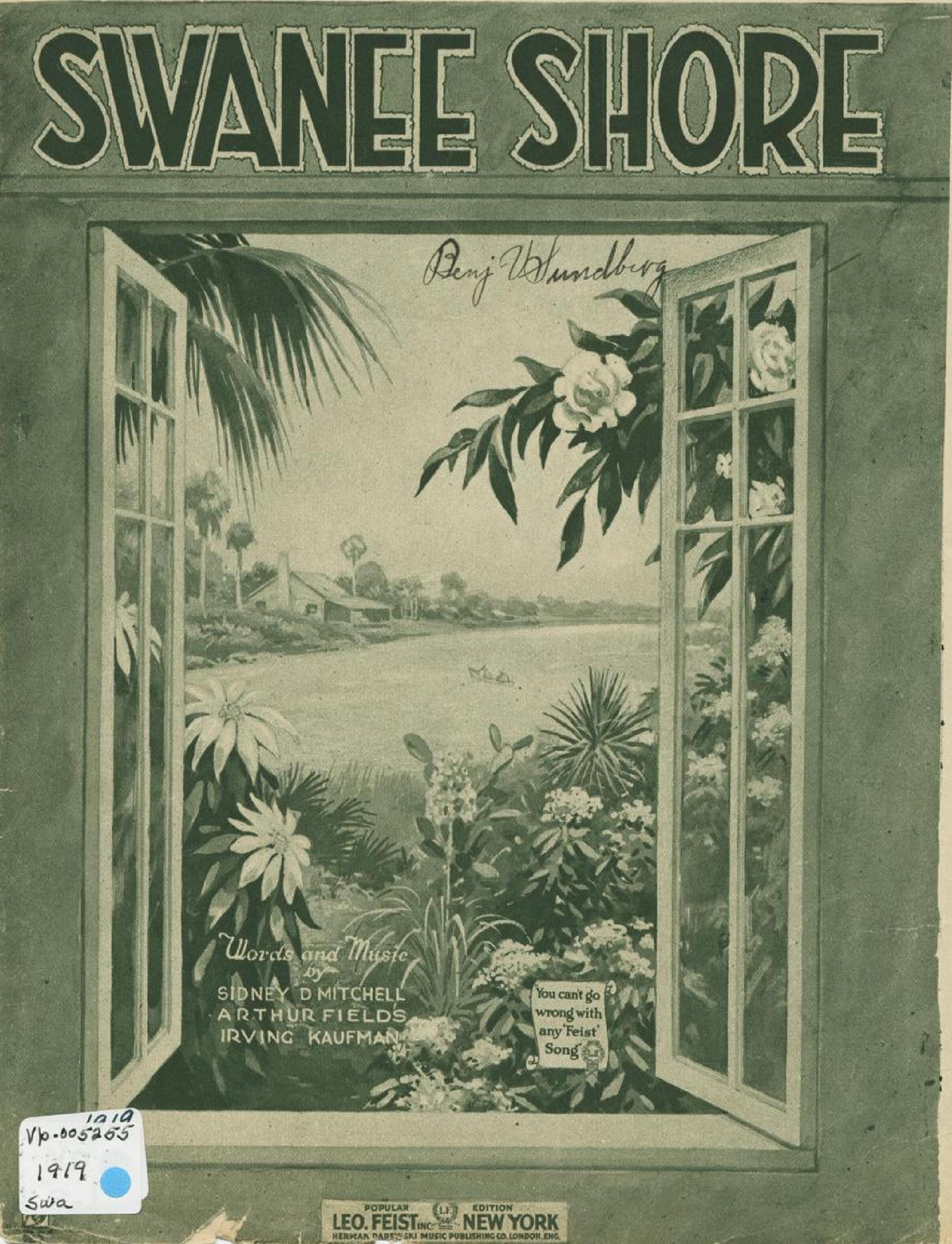
- Sheet music cover

Song
- Published: 1919
- Songwriter(s): Sidney D. Mitchell, Arthur Fields and Irving Kaufman

Swanee Shore: (a dreamy Southern waltz song) is a song composed by Sidney D. Mitchell, Arthur Fields and Irving Kaufman in 1919 and published by Leo Feist Inc.
