= Lawrence Gray =

American actor (1898–1970)

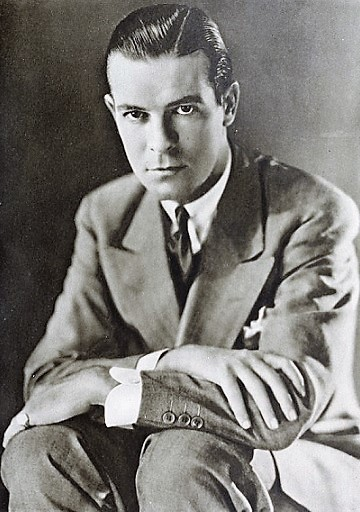
- Gray in 1933
- Born: July 27, 1898; San Francisco, California, U.S.
- Died: February 2, 1970 (aged 71); Mexico City, Mexico
- Occupation: Actor
- Years active: 1925–1936
- Spouse(s): Maria Luisa Figueroa (m. 1935)

Lawrence Gray (July 27, 1898 – February 2, 1970) was an American actor of the 1920s and 1930s.

== Early life and career ==
Born on July 27, 1898, in San Francisco, Gray attended schools there and worked in Standard Oil Company's export department. He served during World War I in the U.S. Navy and became an ensign. After the war, he was production manager at the Lasky Studios, but later became an extra in crowd scenes and such, and liking the work, decided on a film career. He appeared in over 40 films between 1925 and 1936, although many were B movies.

In 1930, he starred in the Metro-Goldwyn-Mayer film musical Children of Pleasure, alongside Wynne Gibson, and was also involved with the film score. That same year he also starred in the Vitaphone film musicals Sunny and Spring is Here.

== Personal life and death ==
On August 7, 1935, with the Associated Press crediting actress Dolores Del Rio as matchmaker, Gray married Mexican former actress Maria Luisa Figueroa; shortly thereafter, they relocated permanently to Mexico City. The marriage produced no children.

Gray died in Mexico City on February 2, 1970, at the age of 71, survived by his wife.

== Selected filmography ==
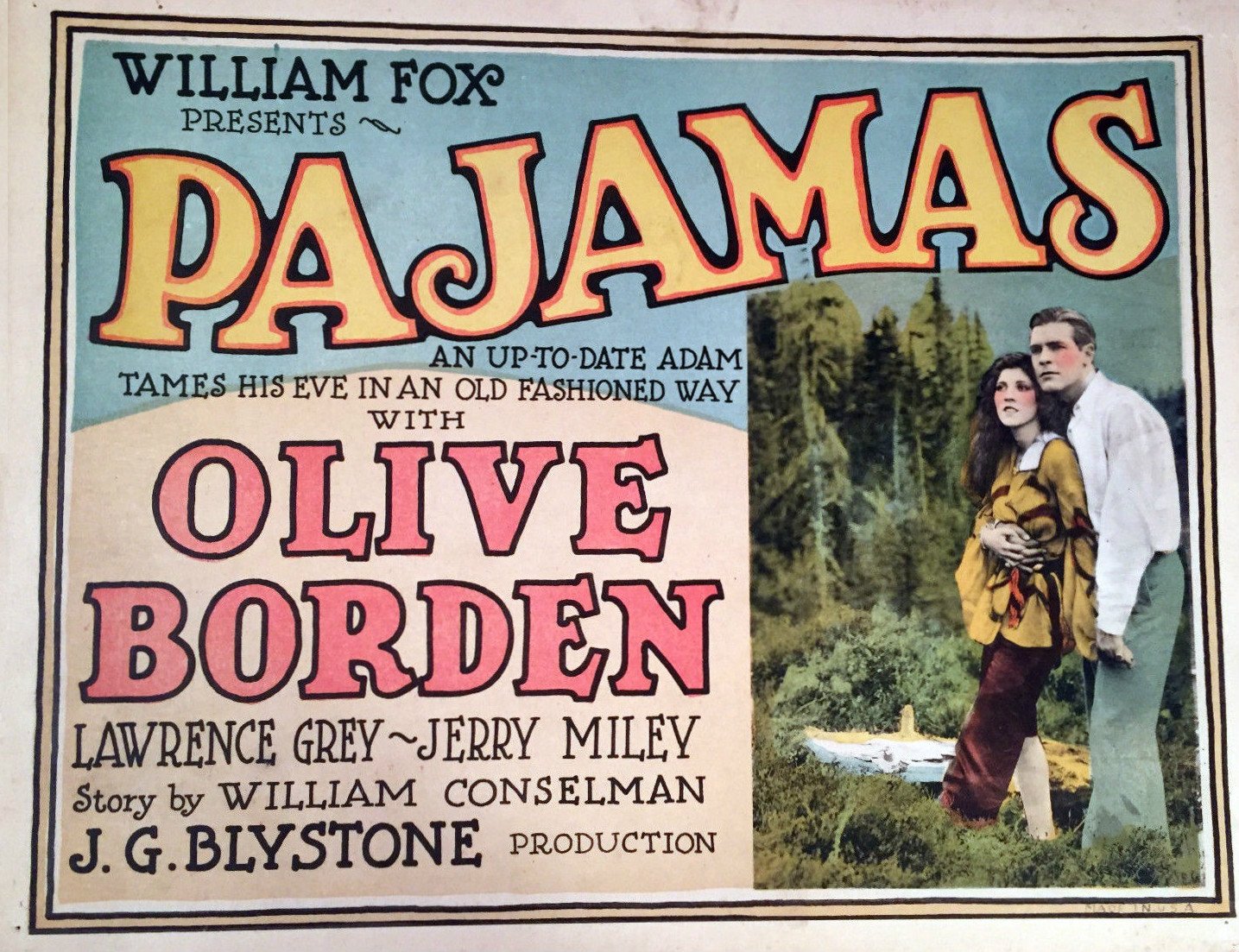
Lobby card with Olive Borden and Gray in Pajamas (1927)

- The Dressmaker from Paris (1925)
- The Coast of Folly (1925)
- Stage Struck (1925)
- Are Parents People? (1925)
- The American Venus (1926)
- The Palm Beach Girl (1926)
- The Untamed Lady (1926)
- Love 'Em and Leave 'Em (1926)
- Kid Boots (1926)
- The Telephone Girl (1927)
- After Midnight (1927)
- The Callahans and the Murphys (1927)
- Convoy (1927)
- Pajamas (1927)
- Diamond Handcuffs (1928)
- Domestic Meddlers (1928)
- Marriage by Contract (1928)
- Love Hungry (1928)
- The Patsy (1928)
- Shadows of the Night (1928)
- It's a Great Life (1929)
- Trent's Last Case (1929)
- The Rainbow (1929)
- Marianne (1929)
- Sunny (1930)
- Spring is Here (1930)
- The Florodora Girl (1930)
- Temptation (1930)
- Man of the World (1931)
- Dizzy Dames (1935)
- Danger Ahead (1935)
- Timber War (1935)
- In Paris, A.W.O.L. (1936)

== External links and sources ==
- Lawrence Gray at IMDb
- Lawrence Gray at the Internet Broadway Database
