= Florodora Girl =

Florodora Girl may refer to:

- The Florodora Girl, a film made in 1930
- Florodora girls, a member of the chorus of the musical Florodora
