= Craigen =

Craigen is a surname. Notable people with the surname include:

- James Craigen (born 1991), English footballer
- James Craigen (born 1938), Scottish politician
- Jessie Craigen, working class suffrage speaker
- Maida Craigen (1861–1942), American actress and clubwoman
