= Lillian Booth Actors Home =

Nursing home in Englewood, New Jersey

Coordinates: 40.91129°N 73.97551°W

Lillian Booth Actors Home of The Actors Fund
- Formation: May 8, 1902; 124 years ago
- Type: Assisted-living facility
- Purpose: Assisting American entertainment and performing arts professionals
- Location: Englewood, New Jersey, United States
- Parent organization: Actors Fund
- Website: actorsfundhome.org

The Lillian Booth Actors Home of The Actors Fund is an American assisted-living facility, in Englewood, New Jersey. It is operated by the Actors Fund, a nonprofit umbrella charitable organization that assists American entertainment and performing arts professionals.

== History ==
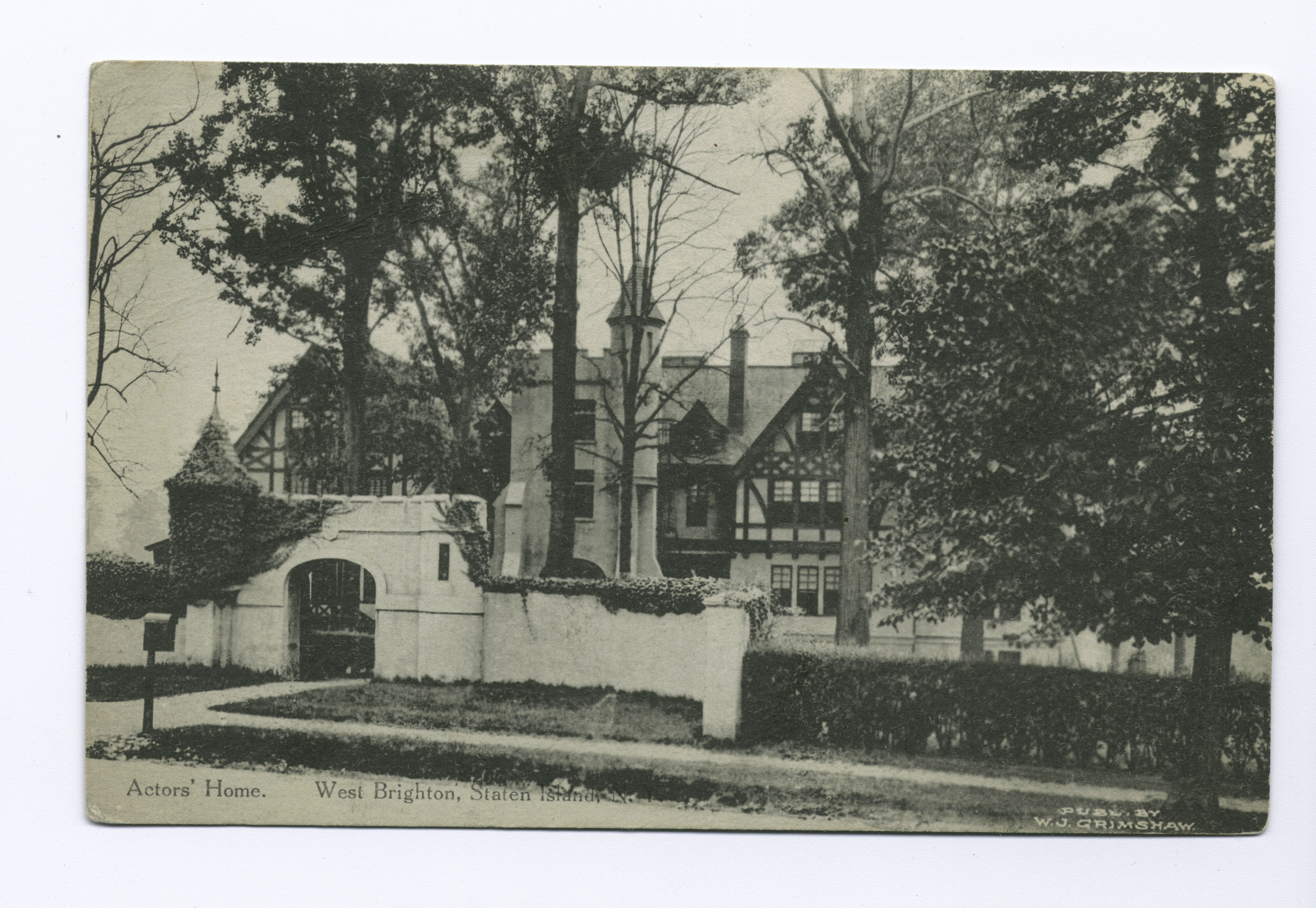
West Brighton, Staten Island

On May 8, 1902, the Actors Fund opened a home for retired entertainers on Staten Island, a borough of New York City, New York. In 1928, the New York City government took the property using eminent domain to enlarge an adjacent city park. That year, the residents were moved to the former mansion of American businesswoman Hetty Green in Englewood. The mansion was razed in 1959, and a modern facility was erected in 1961.

In 1975, the facility was merged with the Percy Williams Home on Long Island, New York. The facilities were expanded in 1988 with a 50-bed nursing home. In the same year, the Edwin Forrest wing was created at the nursing home after a merger with the Edwin Forrest Home in Philadelphia, Pennsylvania.

In 1993, a wing was named in honor of actress Natalie Schafer, notable for her role as Eunice "Lovey" Wentworth Howell on the television sitcom Gilligan's Island (1964–1967), who left $1.5 million to the Actors Fund after her death. In 2003, it was named in honor of Lillian Booth, a philanthropist who donated $2 million to the facility.

== Notable former residents ==
(year of birth–year of death; sorted by year of death)

- Irene Franklin (1876–1941), actress and singer, best known for her work in musical comedy on the Broadway stage of the early 20th Century.
- Maida Craigen (1861–1942), actress and clubwoman, known for Shakespearean roles
- Leslie Stowe (1867–1949), film actor
- Russ Brown (1892–1964), Tony Award winning actor of stage and film remembered by audiences as Captain Brackett in South Pacific.
- Nance O'Neil (1874–1965), actress of stage and silent cinema of the early 20th century, dubbed the American Bernhardt.
- Anne Nichols (1891-1966) American playwright best known as the author of Abie's Irish Rose.
- Juanita Hall (1901-1968), who originated the role of Bloody Mary in South Pacific, for which she won a Tony Award
- Charles Dale (1885–1971), vaudeville performer, who, with Joe Smith, was part of the inseparable and very popular Smith & Dale duo
- Zoel Parenteau (1883–1972), composer of Broadway musicals
- Wendy Barrie (1912–1978) English actress who worked in British and American films, goddaughter of J.M. Barrie
- Glenn Anders (1889–1981) actor, most notable for his work on the Broadway stage, appearing in three Pulitzer Prize winning productions
- Joe Smith (1884–1981) American vaudeville performer, who, with Charlie Dale, was part of the inseparable and very popular Smith & Dale duo.
- Esther Luella Sherman (1893–1982) American Indian Classic Dancer
- Reginald Denham (1894–1983) English writer, theater and film director, actor, and producer who spent much of his life directing Broadway theater.
- May Clark (1885–1971) English silent film actress who starred in the first film adaptation of Alice in Wonderland.
- Roland Winters (1904–1989), actor who portrayed the title character in six Charlie Chan films in the late 1940s
- Dorothy Tree (1906–1992), character actress, voice teacher and writer of books on voice
- Claudia McNeil (1917–1993), actress known for the role of matriarch Lena Younger in both stage and screen productions of A Raisin in the Sun
- Cecil Roy (1900–1995), radio actress of the 1930s and 1940s, later known as the voice of Casper in the Casper the Friendly Ghost animated series of the 1940s and 1950s
- Alfred Ryder (1916–1995), film, radio, and television actor. He appeared in the first aired episode of the television series Star Trek
- Joey Faye (1909–1997), comedian and actor who appeared with Phil Silvers in two Broadway shows, High Button Shoes and Top Banana, and later as a guest star on many TV shows
- Ray Heatherton (1909–1997)
- Ed Herlihy (1909–1999)
- Imogene Coca (1908–2001) Emmy award-winning actress (Best Actress for Your Show of Shows, 1951) who was notable in later years for playing the role of "Aunt Edna" in National Lampoon's Vacation.
- Nancy Coleman (1912–2001)
- Radie Harris (1904-2001) American entertainment journalist and newspaper columnist.
- Rosetta LeNoire (1911–2002)
- Dolly Dawn (1916-2002) American big band singer.
- Hildy Parks (1926–2004)
- Jack Lesberg (1920-2005)
- Pamela Duncan (1924–2005)
- John Fiedler (1925–2005)
- Joseph Bova (1924–2006)
- Franklin Cover (1928–2006)
- Robert Earl Jones (1910–2006), boxer and actor
- Dody Goodman (1914–2008)
- Louisa Horton Hill (1920–2008)
- Marilyn Cooper (1934–2009)
- Susanna Foster (1924–2009)
- Aaron Schroeder (1926–2009), President of Musicor Records, composer, Gene Pitney's Manager
- Dolores Sutton (1927–2009)
- Shirl Bernheim (1921-2009) American actress of film and television.
- Leslie Barrett (1919–2010)
- Jane Nossette Jarvis (1915–2010)
- Jane Sherman (1908–2010)
- Ted Sorel (1936–2010)
- Dolores Mae Wilson (1928–2010)
- Graham Brown (1924–2011)
- Clarice Taylor (1917–2011)
- Margaret Whiting (1924–2011)
- Carrie Smith (1925–2012)
- Jane Connell (1925–2013)
- Sheila MacRae (1921–2014)
- Judith Malina (1926–2015) German-born American theater and film actress, writer and director. She co-founded The Living Theatre, a radical political theatre troupe in New York City and Paris.
- Grover Van Dexter (1920–2015) Stage, screen, and TV actor who later served the antique toy collecting passions of his actor friends by opening Second Childhood toys in New York City.
- Vivian Nathan (1916–2015) Stage and screen actress and an original founding member of the Actors Studio. She served on the Actors Studio's board of directors until 1999.
- Mark Murphy (1932–2015)
- Tammy Grimes (1934–2016)
- Earle Hyman (1926–2017)
- Joseph Jarman (1937–2019) Jazz musician, composer, and Shinshu Buddhist priest
- Max Wright (1943–2019)
- Marshall Efron (1938–2019)
- Allan Rich (1926–2020)
- Janet Lawson (1940–2021)
- Harvey Evans (1941-2021)
- Marvin Kitman (1929–2023)
- Lelia Goldoni (1936–2023)
- Maurice Hines (1943-2023)
- Jack W. Batman (1944-2025) Tony Award winning producer.
- Carmen de Lavallade (1931-2025)

== In popular culture ==
The facility was the subject of the short documentary film Curtain Call (2000), directed by Charles Braverman; the film was nominated for an Academy Award for Best Documentary (Short Subject).

== See also ==
- Motion Picture & Television Country House and Hospital
