= Jerry Miley =

American film actor (1899–1979)

- Miley in c. 1927
- Born: Emmor Jerome Miley Jr. July 28, 1899; Alameda, California, U.S.
- Died: June 11, 1979 (aged 79); Santa Barbara, California, U.S.
- Occupation: Film actor
- Spouse: Elsa Petersen (m. 1932, annulled)

Emmor Jerome Miley Jr. (July 28, 1899 – June 11, 1979) was an American film actor. He was known for playing Allen Colby, the murdered heir in the 1936 film Charlie Chan's Secret.

== Life and career ==
Miley was born in Alameda, California, the son of Emmor Jerome Sr., an oil businessman, and Beatrice Miley. He began his screen career in 1926, appearing in the film Wild Oats Lane. In the same year, he appeared in the films Broken Hearts of Hollywood and Bred in Old Kentucky.

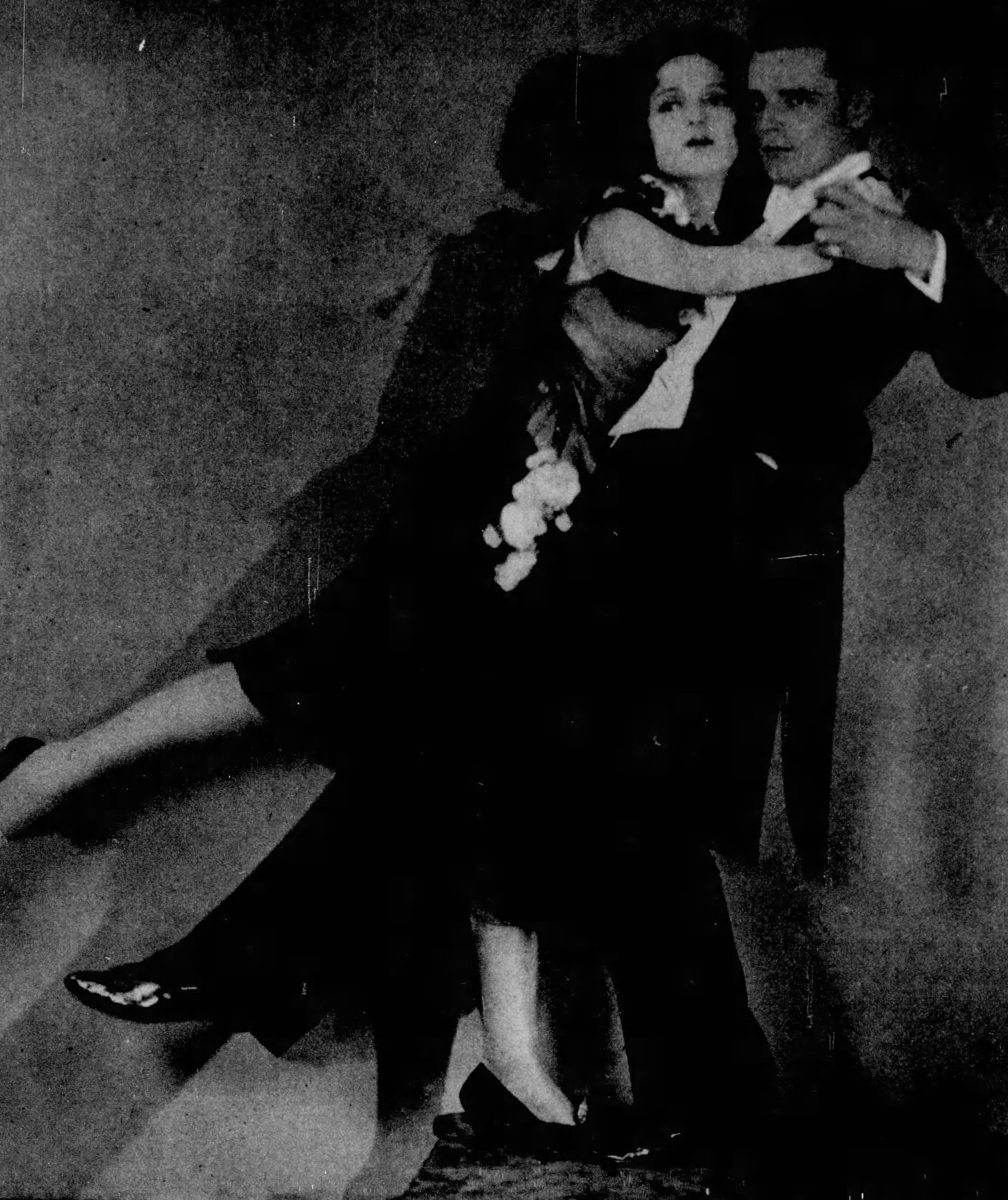
Miley (right) with Carmel Myers, 1926

Later in his career, in 1936, Miley appeared in the film Charlie Chan's Secret, playing Allen Colby, the murdered heir and nephew of Henrietta Colby Lowell (Henrietta Crosman). He appeared in films such as Pajamas (as Russell Forrest), Paris in Spring, The Foxes of Harrow, Nightmare Alley, The Foxes of Harrow, Down Among the Sheltering Palms, Fury at Furnace Creek, One in a Million and Rock Island Trail.

Miley retired from acting in 1952, last appearing in the film Les Misérables.

== Death ==
Miley died of a cardiac arrest on June 11, 1979, in Santa Barbara, California, at the age of 79. He was buried at Santa Barbara Cemetery.
