= Man of the World (film) =

1931 film

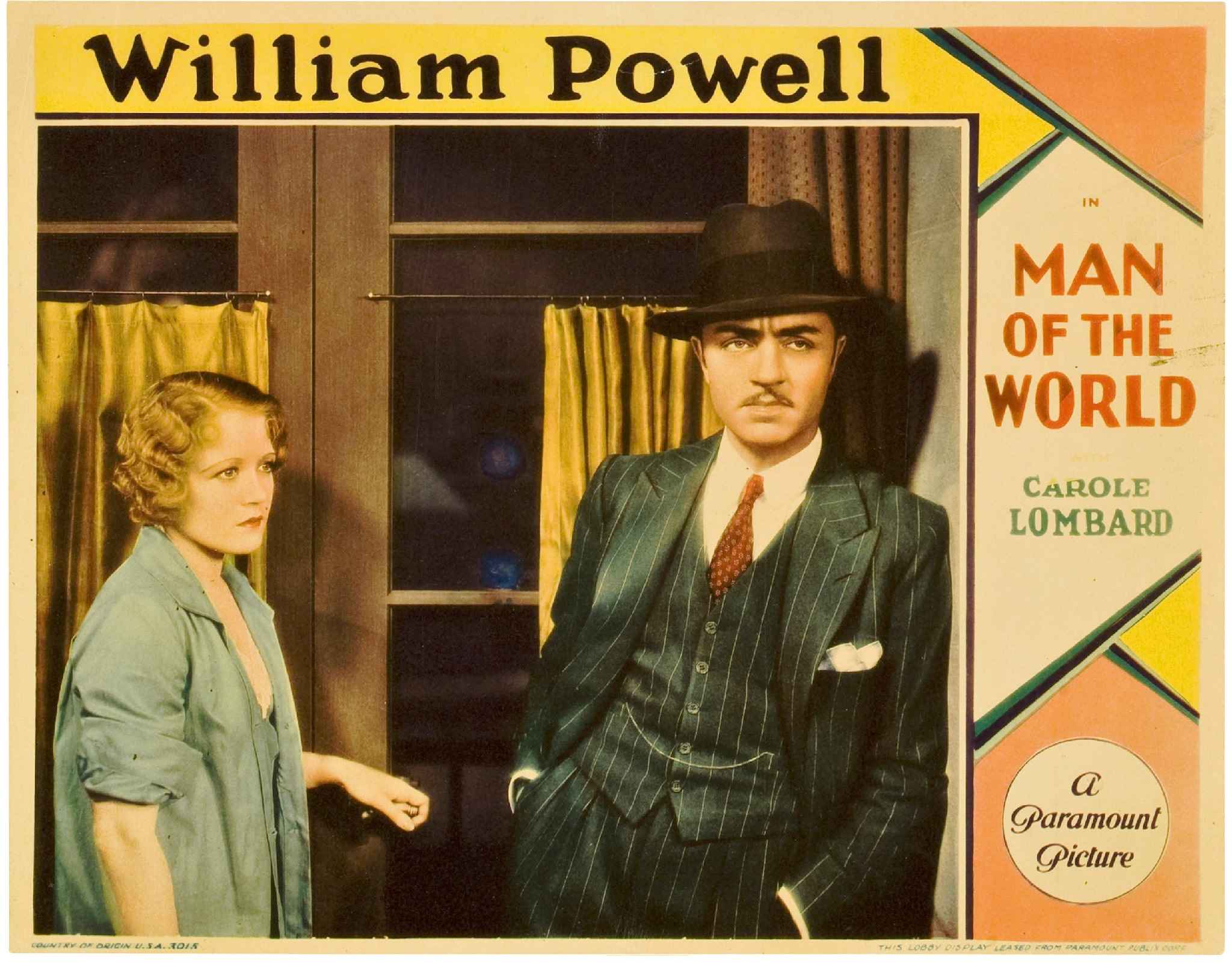
- Wynne Gibson and Powell featured on lobby card
- Directed by: Richard Wallace
- Written by: Herman J. Mankiewicz
- Starring: William Powell; Carole Lombard; Wynne Gibson
- Cinematography: Victor Milner
- Music by: Herman Hand
- Production company: Paramount Pictures
- Distributed by: Paramount Pictures
- Release date: March 28, 1931
- Running time: 72 minutes
- Country: United States
- Language: English

Man of the World is a 1931 American pre-Code romantic drama film directed by Richard Wallace and starring William Powell, Carole Lombard, and Wynne Gibson. It was produced and distributed by Paramount Pictures

The story is about a young American girl who visits Paris accompanied by her fiancé and her wealthy uncle. There she meets and is romanced by a worldly novelist; what she does not know is that he is a blackmailer who is using her to get to her uncle.

== Plot ==
In Paris in the early 1930s, American Michael Trevor poses as a novelist but is actually a former newspaper man called Jimmy Powers who took the blame for some scam in the US and chose to flee the country. Embittered, he now prints a weekly scandal sheet and blackmails expatriates to keep their names out of his rag. While extorting $2000 from the wealthy Harold Taylor (a scam done so smoothly that Harold thinks Michael has done him a big favor), Michael meets Harold's niece, Mary Kendall, and the two feel an instant mutual attraction. Mary has a boyfriend, Frank Reynolds, but she is not passionate about him. Michael's partners in crime are Irene Harper and Fred. Irene is a former flame who is still not over Michael. She needs money to keep her brother out of prison and proposes that they extort more money from Harold by embroiling Mary in a scandal. Michael resists—he has a rule never to target women—but then reluctantly agrees.

While Frank is away on business, Michael spends time with Mary and they fall in love. She tries to end it in a letter to Frank, but is unable to finish it. Michael tells Irene that he is done being a criminal because he is in love with Mary, which causes Irene to become jealous. She threatens to tell Mary all about who he really is so Michael decides to tell Mary himself. Mary says that it is all in the past; they love each other and nothing else matters.

Michael tells Irene that he and Mary are going to be married and that she now knows the truth about him and loves him nonetheless. Irene says that some day his past will come out, and Mary will then be the wife of a known criminal. These words weigh on Michael and he realizes that, for Mary's sake, he cannot marry her.

Michael tells Harold that he was behind the earlier scam and demands a further $10,000 or he will print a piece about his planned wedding to Mary. Harold is angry and Mary is hurt and confused, but Michael is determined to go ahead with his scheme. Harold pays him off with a check, which Mary herself hands to him with a slap across his face. After seeing how much Michael cares for Mary, Irene decides to instead get the money needed for her brother by selling her jewelry. She also tells the police that Michael is behind the scandal sheet; they give him 24 hours to leave France. Mary and Frank sail back to Pittsburgh, a conspicuous engagement ring on her hand. Michael heads to Cape Town, and agrees to let Irene come along. Aboard ship, he tears up the $10,000 check.

== Cast ==
- William Powell as Michael Trevor
- Carole Lombard as Mary Kendall
- Wynne Gibson as Irene Harper
- Lawrence Gray as Frank Reynolds
- Guy Kibbee as Harold Taylor
- George Chandler as Fred
- André Cheron as Victor (uncredited)
- Harvey Clark as Joe, an American Tourist (uncredited)
- Tom Costello as Spade Henderson (uncredited)
- Tom Ricketts as Mr. Bradkin (uncredited)
- Rolfe Sedan as Hotel Desk Clerk (uncredited)
- Maude Truax as Mrs. Jowitt (uncredited)

== Reception ==
The New York Times critic Mordaunt Hall described the film as "a rather interesting but scarcely credible story ... But withal, aside from a few somewhat tedious stretches, it is a tale that inveigles one's attention."

== Home media ==
This film was released as part of the DVD set Carole Lombard: The Glamour Collection, which, in addition to this film, includes the films We're Not Dressing (1934), Hands Across the Table (1935), Love Before Breakfast (1936), The Princess Comes Across (1936) and True Confession (1937). This title was also released as an individual DVD in 2013 as a part of the Universal Vault Series.
