= Pajamas (film) =

1927 film

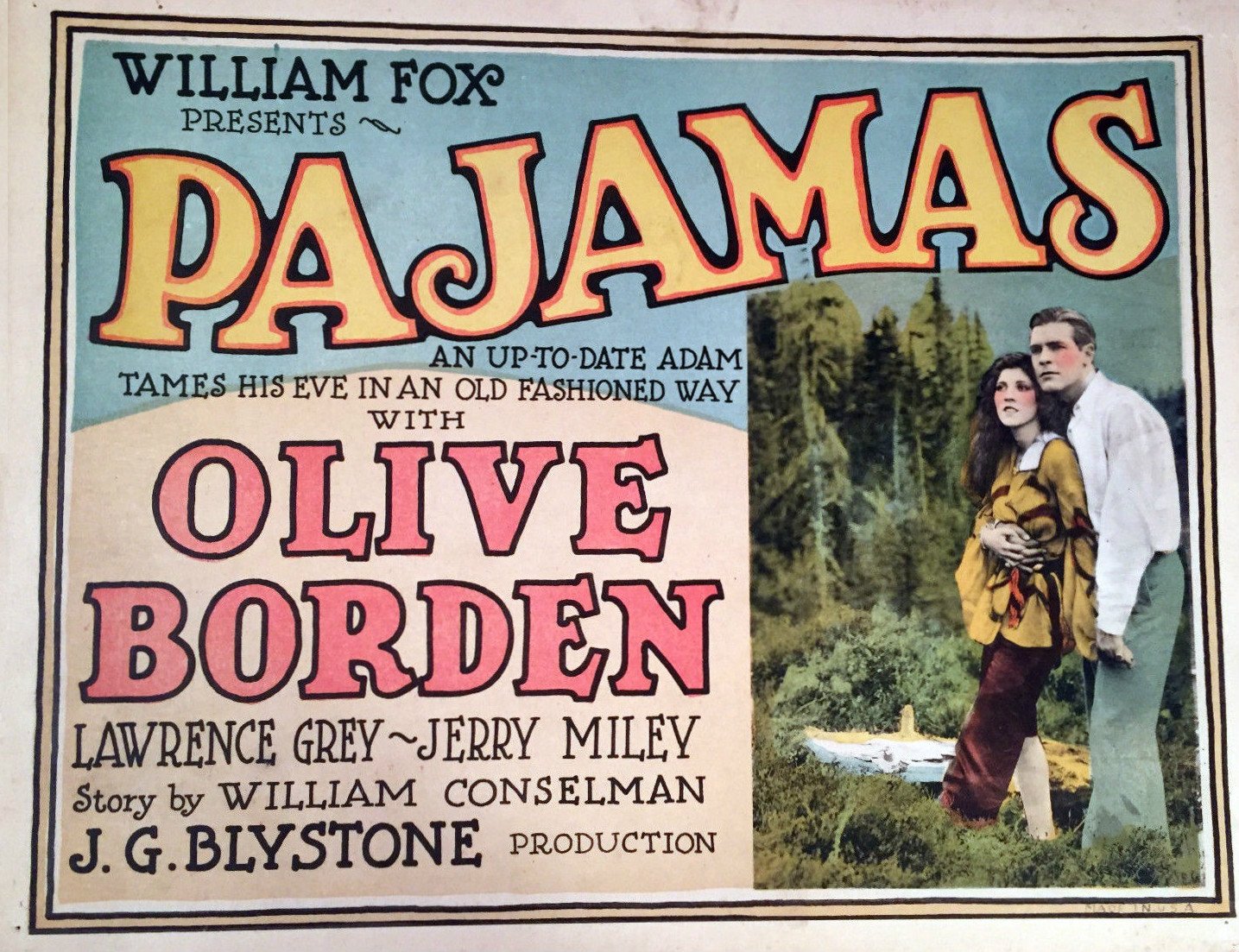
- Lobby card
- Directed by: John G. Blystone
- Screenplay by: William Conselman; Malcolm Stuart Boylan
- Story by: William Conselman
- Starring: Olive Borden; Lawrence Gray; J.J. Clark; Jerry Miley
- Cinematography: Glen MacWilliams
- Production company: Fox Film Corporation
- Distributed by: Fox Film Corporation
- Release date: October 23, 1927
- Running time: 60 minutes
- Country: United States
- Language: English

Pajamas is a 1927 American silent comedy film directed by John G. Blystone and written by William Conselman and Malcolm Stuart Boylan. The film stars Olive Borden, Lawrence Gray, J.J. Clark and Jerry Miley. The film was released on October 23, 1927, by Fox Film Corporation.

Location shooting for the film was done at Lake Louise and Lake O'Hara in Alberta, Canada.

== Cast ==
- Olive Borden as Angela Wade
- Lawrence Gray as John Weston
- J.J. Clark as Daniel Wade
- Jerry Miley as Russell Forrest

== Preservation ==
Pajamas is currently presumed lost. In February of 2021, the film was cited by the National Film Preservation Board on their Lost U.S. Silent Feature Films list.
