= Temptation (1930 film) =

- Still from the film
- Directed by: E. Mason Hopper
- Written by: Leonard Praskins
- Produced by: Harry Cohn
- Starring: Lois Wilson; Lawrence Gray; Billy Bevan
- Cinematography: William Marshall
- Edited by: Dave Berg
- Production company: Columbia Pictures
- Distributed by: Columbia Pictures
- Release date: June 5, 1930
- Running time: 66 minutes
- Country: United States
- Language: English

Temptation is a 1930 American romance film directed by E. Mason Hopper. It was produced by Columbia Pictures.

== Cast ==
- Lois Wilson as Julie
- Lawrence Gray as Larry
- Billy Bevan as Sam
- Eileen Percy as Babe
- Gertrude Bennett as Mame
- Robert T. Haines as Warden

== Reception ==
A contemporary review in The Jersey Journal referred to the film as having "superb entertainment" with a "capable cast".

A contemporary review in The Paducah Sun praised the performances of Lois Wilson, and Lawrence Gray.
