= Two Tickets to Broadway =

1951 film by James V. Kern

- Original film poster
- Directed by: James V. Kern
- Written by: Sammy Cahn
- Produced by: Norman Krasna; Jerry Wald; Howard Hughes (uncredited)
- Starring: Tony Martin; Janet Leigh; Gloria DeHaven; Ann Miller; Eddie Bracken
- Cinematography: Edward Cronjager; Harry J. Wild
- Edited by: Harry Marker
- Music by: Walter Scharf
- Production company: RKO Pictures
- Distributed by: RKO Pictures
- Release date: November 21, 1951 (New York)
- Running time: 106 minutes
- Country: United States
- Language: English
- Box office: $2 million (U.S. rentals)

Two Tickets to Broadway is a 1951 American musical film directed by James V. Kern and starring Tony Martin, Janet Leigh, Gloria DeHaven and Ann Miller. It was filmed on the RKO Forty Acres backlot. The film was choreographed by Busby Berkeley.

== Plot ==
Frustrated singers Hannah Holbrook, Joyce Campbell and S. F. "Foxy" Rogers return dejectedly to New York on a bus after their engagement in Vermont, arranged by small-time promoter Lew Conway, was a huge flop.

Nancy Peterson, another passenger on the bus, and Dan Carter mistakenly have each other's bags. Both are entertainers and become better acquainted after the mix-up.

Lew represents Dan and tries to convince him to accept the same gig that the girl singers had just left. Lew meets delicatessen owners Leo and Harry, who might have money to invest in his performers' careers. The agent asks an impersonator to pretend to be the producer of bandleader Bob Crosby's television program.

Everybody excitedly believes that Lew has booked them on the show. Lew repeatedly tries to meet with Crosby's actual producer but fails. He lies to the singers that Crosby will not book them because he is jealous of Dan's ability as a singer. Nancy is furious and barges into the television studio to berate Crosby and his producer, who have no idea what she is talking about.

Nancy boards a bus, headed back home. Crosby's producer says that he has been interested in Dan for quite a while and finds himself with a slot to fill on that night's show after Lew locks the scheduled performers in a closet. Nancy refuses to believe Lew that the gang is really is performing on tonight's show until she spots Dan singing on a television in a store window. She races back to New York just in time to join the others on the show.

== Cast ==
- Tony Martin as Dan Carter
- Janet Leigh as Nancy Peterson
- Gloria DeHaven as Hannah Holbrook
- Eddie Bracken as Lew Conway
- Ann Miller as Joyce Campbell
- Barbara Lawrence as S. F. Rogers
- Bob Crosby as himself
- Charles Dale as Leo, Palace Deli
- Joe Smith as Harry, Palace Deli
- Taylor Holmes as Willard Glendon
- Buddy Baer as Sailor on Bus
- Kathleen O'Malley as Showgirl

== Production ==
The roles of the two delicatessen owners played by the vaudeville comedy duo Smith and Dale were originally offered to Stan Laurel and Oliver Hardy, who declined because Laurel was ill.

== Reception ==
In a contemporary review for The New York Times, critic A. H. Weiler wrote: "[T]he newcomer is merely conventional in plot, brisk in pace, heavily freighted with song and light in comedy. And, if its story line is not precisely ingenius, the cast is energetic in trying to keep things moving. Broadway, in short, has been exposed to the likes of 'Two Tickets· to Broadway' many times before. This time, the experience is just a mite more cheerful than usual."

The film recorded an estimated loss of $1,150,000.

== Awards ==
Two Tickets to Broadway was nominated for an Academy Award for Best Sound Recording (John O. Aalberg).
