= Bred in Old Kentucky =

1926 film directed by Edward Dillon

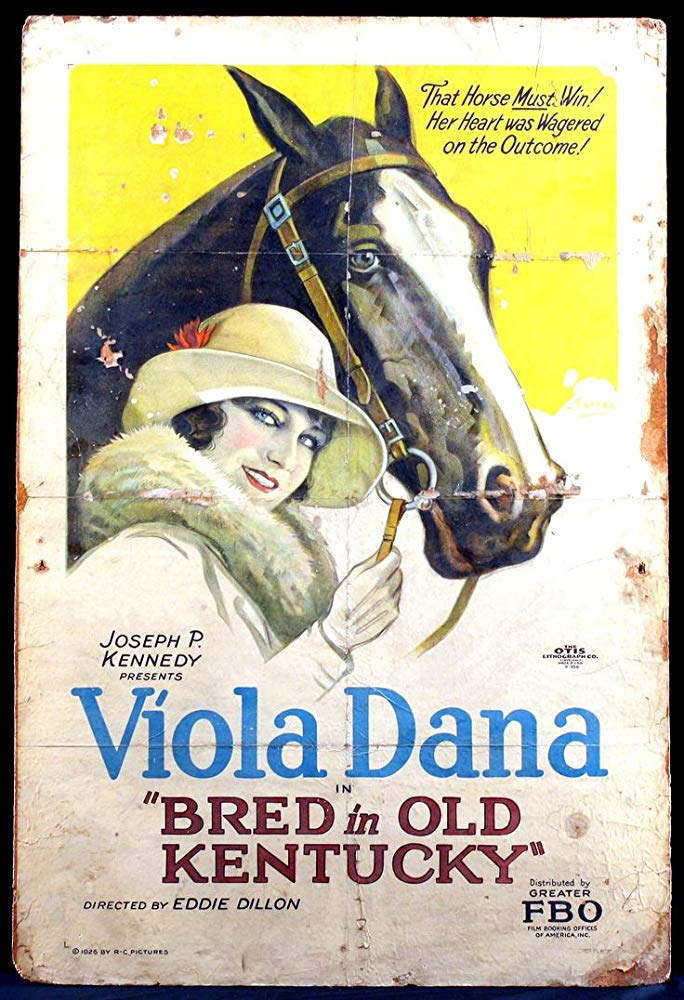
- Directed by: Edward Dillon
- Written by: Louis Weadock; G. B. Lancaster; Gerald C. Duffy
- Produced by: Joseph P. Kennedy
- Starring: Viola Dana; Jerry Miley; Jed Prouty
- Cinematography: Philip Tannura
- Production company: Robertson-Cole Pictures Corporation
- Distributed by: Film Booking Offices of America
- Release date: November 21, 1926
- Running time: 60 minutes
- Country: United States
- Languages: Silent; English intertitles

Bred in Old Kentucky is a 1926 American silent sports film directed by Edward Dillon and starring Viola Dana, Jerry Miley and Jed Prouty.

== Cast ==
- Viola Dana as Katie O'Doone
- Jerry Miley as Dennis Reilly
- Jed Prouty as Jake Trumbull
- Jim Mason as Tod Cuyler
- Roy Laidlaw as Mr. Welkin
- Josephine Crowell as Landlady

== Bibliography ==
- Munden, Kenneth White. The American Film Institute Catalog of Motion Pictures Produced in the United States, Part 1. University of California Press, 1997.
