= I Love a Parade =

1932 film by Rudolf Ising

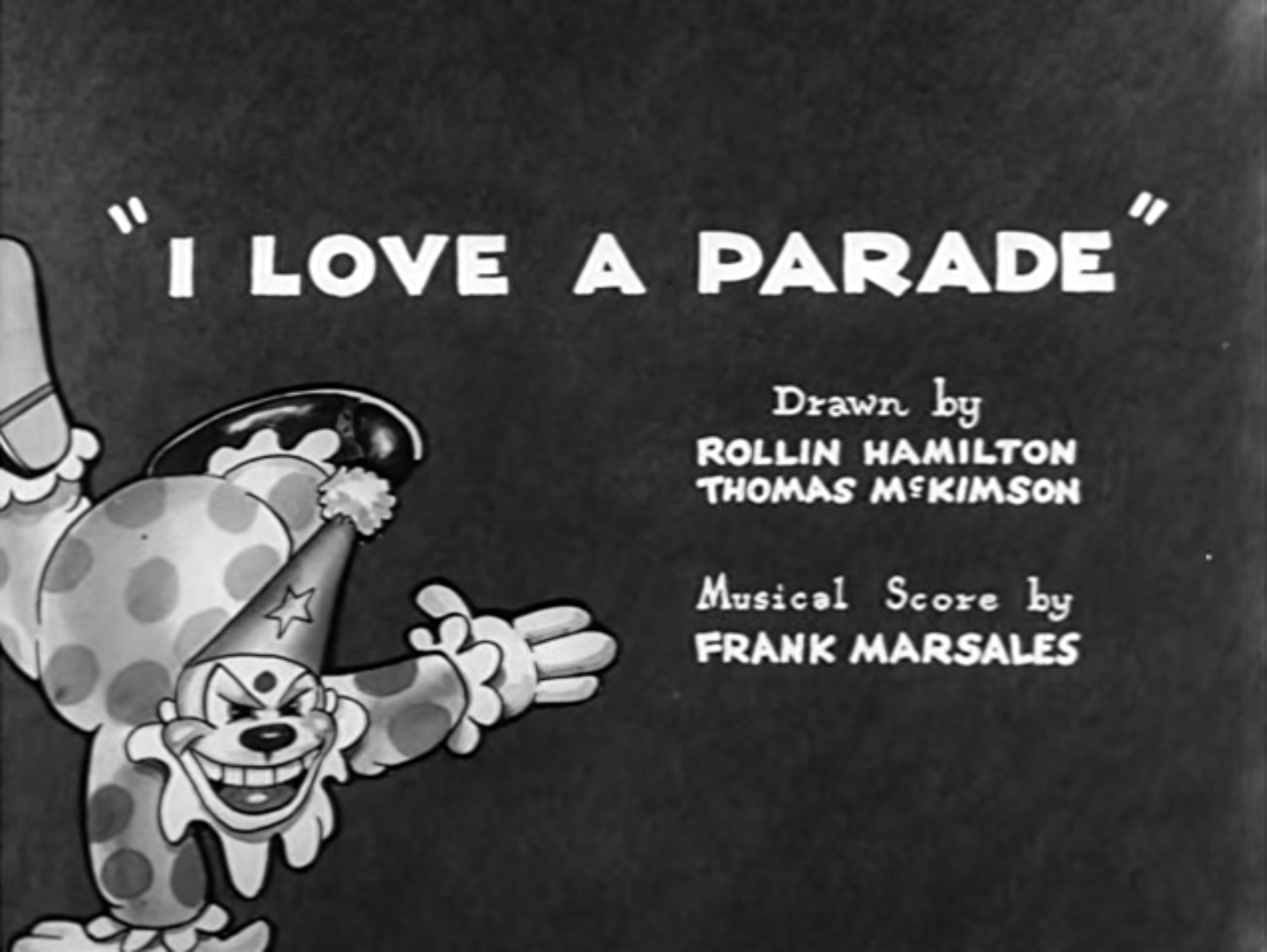
- Title card
- Directed by: Rudolf Ising
- Produced by: Hugh Harman; Rudolf Ising; Leon Schlesinger
- Music by: Frank Marsales
- Animation by: Rollin Hamilton; Thomas McKimson
- Color process: Black and white
- Production companies: Harman-Ising Productions; Leon Schlesinger Productions
- Distributed by: Warner Bros. Pictures; The Vitaphone Corporation
- Release date: August 6, 1932
- Running time: 7 min
- Country: United States
- Language: English

I Love a Parade is a 1932 American animated comedy short film directed by Rudolf Ising. It is the fourteenth film in the Merrie Melodies series, featuring the titular song by Harold Arlen, which was an unused musical number for the 1931 film Manhattan Parade. The short was released on August 6, 1932.

== Plot ==
Full short

At a circus, a clown does tricks while a marching band consisting of animals marches to the beat of the music. A lion accidentally wrecks his drum, which he replaces by a volunteering dog which eats the drum and is used as a drumhead, while disposing of a Mickey Mouse-like mouse which held the drum upright. The crowd, enjoying the clown's tricks, sings the titular song. A dog rides a truck holding a circus lion, only to enter a small pipe and be locked in the truck while the lion gleefully drives it. A janitor is at the end of the parade, stopping the singing to a halt by angrily expressing his annoyance.

The circus ringleader then organizes a freak show. Those exhibited include ethnic stereotypes such as Jojo the Wild Man (an African brute in captivity), Gumbo the Indian Rubber Man (a contortionist which can literally turn into rubber), a pair of pig Siamese twins, a tattooed strongman who does an effeminate impression with a tattoo on his forehead as well as "inflating" a tattooed woman's buttocks by flexing his biceps with cleverly placed tattoos, as well as a hippo hula dancer, who is provoked by a cat into fighting the strongman, who goes down in one hit while the tattoo on his chest, a ship, sinks.

The circus ringleader then announces a "skinny man from India", which turns out to be Mahatma Gandhi playing music while a goat dances next to him. A hippo dancer dances while periodically hops on a horse running laps, only to end up under the horse and running after a conflict. A mouse rides a tricycle on an elephant without falling. A female cat tightrope walker performs while singing. Outside of the circus, an ostrich peeks through a hole while mice use a bow and arrows to shoot its buttocks, launching the mice in one by one while they writhe in pain. A lion and his trainer perform, with them taking turns to place their heads into each other's mouths. The lion uses its dentures to remove fleas from its furs, ending their performance.

== Reception ==
The Film Daily noted that "Here is a cartoon that gets away from the cut-and-dried animal antics".

== Home media ==
The short was released as an unrestored extra on the Looney Tunes Golden Collection: Volume 6, Disc 3.
