= Houston Branch =

American screenwriter

- Born: March 5, 1899; St. Paul, Minnesota
- Died: January 1, 1968 (aged 68)
- Occupation: Screenwriter
- Years active: 1927–1958

Houston Branch (March 5, 1899 – January 1968) was an American screenwriter. He wrote for 50 films from 1927 to 1958. He was born in St. Paul, Minnesota.

== Selected filmography ==
- Once and Forever (1927) (also story)
- The Showdown (1928) (based on Branch's play Wildcat)
- Ladies of the Night Club (1928)
- Square Shoulders (1929)
- Sioux Blood (1929)
- Shanghai Lady (1929)
- Square Shoulders (1929)
- Captain of the Guard (1930)
- I Like Your Nerve (1931)
- Safe in Hell (1931)
- Manhattan Parade (1931)
- Alias the Doctor (1932)
- The Heart of New York (1932) (play)
- Tiger Shark (1932) (story)
- The Match King (1932)
- Hard to Handle (1933) (story)
- West of Singapore (1933)
- Emergency Call (1933)
- The Silk Express (1933)
- Flaming Gold (1933)
- Don't Get Personal (1936)
- Yellowstone (1936)
- North of Nome (1936)
- Men in Exile (1937)
- Public Wedding (1937) (also story)
- The Trigger Trio (1937) (story)
- Wallaby Jim of the Islands (1937)
- Mr. Wong, Detective (1938)
- Mystery Ship (1941)
- The Blonde from Singapore (1941)
- Headin' for God's Country (1943)
- Women in Bondage (1943)
- Klondike Kate (1943)
- Block Busters (1944) (story)
- Belle of the Yukon (1944) (story)
- Girls of the Big House (1945)
- Wild Harvest (1947) (story)
- River Lady (1948)
- Untamed Frontier (1952) (story)
- Sweethearts on Parade (1953)
- City of Shadows (1955)
- Congo Crossing (1956) (story)
- A Strange Adventure (1956)
- The Wayward Girl (1957)
