= Emergency Call (1933 film) =

1933 film by Edward L. Cahn

- Theatrical release poster
- Directed by: Edward L. Cahn
- Screenplay by: Houston Branch; Joseph L. Mankiewicz
- Story by: John B. Clymer; James Ewens
- Produced by: Merian C. Cooper
- Starring: William Boyd; Wynne Gibson; William Gargan; George E. Stone; Betty Furness
- Cinematography: J. Roy Hunt
- Edited by: Daniel Mandell
- Music by: Roy Webb
- Production company: RKO Pictures
- Distributed by: RKO Pictures
- Release date: June 24, 1933
- Running time: 70 minutes
- Country: United States
- Language: English

Emergency Call is a 1933 American pre-Code action film directed by Edward L. Cahn and written by Houston Branch and Joseph L. Mankiewicz. The film stars William Boyd, Wynne Gibson, William Gargan, George E. Stone and Betty Furness. The film was released on June 24, 1933 by RKO Pictures.

== Cast ==
- William Boyd as Joe
- Wynne Gibson as Mabel
- William Gargan as Steve
- George E. Stone as Sammie
- Betty Furness as Alice
- Edwin Maxwell as Rourke
- Merna Kennedy as Day File Clerk
- Oscar Apfel as Dr. Schwarz
- Paul Fix as Dr. Mason
- Helen Lynch as Telephone Operator
- Jane Darwell as Head Nurse Brown (Uncredited)
