= Children of Pleasure =

1930 film by Harry Beaumont

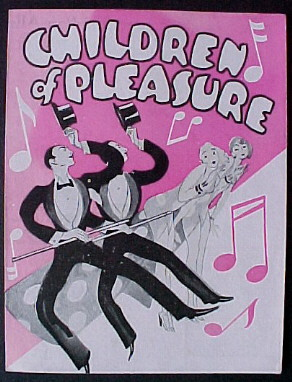
- Poster
- Directed by: Harry Beaumont
- Written by: Richard Schayer; Crane Wilbur
- Based on: The Song Writer; 1928 play by Crane Wilbur
- Starring: Lawrence Gray; Wynne Gibson
- Cinematography: Percy Hilburn (fr); Technicolor sequences
- Edited by: Blanche Sewell
- Distributed by: Metro-Goldwyn-Mayer
- Release date: April 26, 1930
- Running time: 70 minutes
- Country: United States
- Language: English

Children of Pleasure is a 1930 American pre-Code MGM musical comedy film directed by Harry Beaumont, originally released with Technicolor sequences. It was adapted from Crane Wilbur's 1929 play, The Song Writer.

== Plot ==
Danny, an acclaimed singer and songwriter, falls in love with a socialite girl who he then overhears admitting that she is stringing him along just in time to avoid marriage. Danny is notably Jewish, and among the issues the film raises is his temptation to assimilate into the larger culture.

The film is an adaptation of a play that riffed on the real-life relationship between songwriter Irving Berlin and Long Island socialite Ellin Mackay, which was all over the gossip columns in the late 1920s. Mackay's millionaire father cut her off and did not speak to her for years because, after a long courtship, she married Berlin, who was Jewish. (Unlike the fickle debutante in the film, Mackay stayed with Berlin, and their marriage lasted over sixty years.)

The film is played against a theatrical backdrop, and contains many songs and production numbers.

== Cast ==
- Lawrence Gray as Danny Regan
- Wynne Gibson as Emma 'Em' Gray
- Judith Wood as Patricia 'Pat' Thayer (as Helen Johnson)
- Kenneth Thomson as Rod Peck (as Kenneth Thompson)
- Lee Kohlmar as Bernie (as Lee Kolmar)
- May Boley as Fanny Kaye
- Benny Rubin as Andy Little
- Jack Benny as himself, Cameo Appearance (uncredited)
- Sidney Bracey as Miles (butler) (uncredited)
- Mary Carlisle as Secretary (uncredited)
- Carrie Daumery as Dowager (uncredited)
- Ann Dvorak as Chorus girl (uncredited)
- Jay Eaton as Eddie Brown (uncredited)

== Production ==
The film was originally premiered and released with Technicolor sequences in the summer of 1930. Several film reviewers refer to these Technicolor sequences.

One reviewer noted that "the revue scenes filmed in Technicolor being particularly lavish." These color sequences were later replaced with a black-and-white version that had been filmed simultaneously because the backlash against musicals (which occurred in the autumn of 1930) made the expense of printing color prints superfluous and frivolous. Only this black-and-white general release version currently exists except for a portion of the Technicolor "Dust" number that was re-used in the short film Roast-Beef and Movies in 1934, and can also be seen in That's Entertainment! III (1994). This color clip is currently viewable on YouTube.

== Soundtrack ==
Lawrence Gray recorded two of his songs from the picture for Brunswick Records. His rendition of the songs Leave It That Way and The Whole Darned Thing's For You were released on Brunswick's popular ten-inch series on record number 4775.

== See also ==
- List of American films of 1930
- List of early color feature films
