= Curtain Call (2000 film) =

2000 American documentary short film

- Directed by: Charles Braverman
- Produced by: Charles Braverman; Peter LeDonne
- Edited by: Simeon Hutner
- Production company: Braverman Productions
- Distributed by: Cinemax (TV); New Day Films (home video)
- Release date: 2000
- Country: United States
- Language: English

Curtain Call is a 2000 American short documentary film directed by Charles Braverman. It was nominated for an Academy Award for Best Documentary Short.

== Synopsis ==
Curtain Call tells the story of eight remarkable residents of the Actors' Fund Home. These residents are still full of vitality as they recall tales of Broadway's golden age, and what they have done with their lives.

== Awards and nominations ==
Incomplete list of awards for Curtain Call
Year	Award	Category	Result
2000	73rd Academy Awards	Best Documentary Short Subject	Nominated

== See also ==
- List of documentary films
- List of American films of 2000
