= Prince Karl (play) =

1886 play by A. C. Gunter

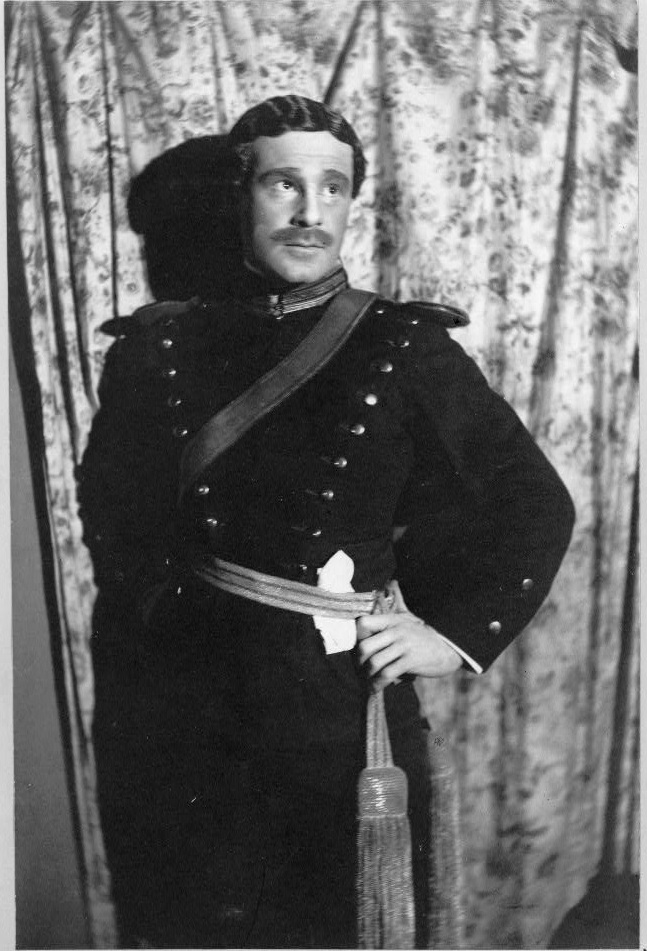
- Richard Mansfield as Prince Karl
- Written by: A. C. Gunter
- Original language: English
- Genre: Comedy

Premiere
- Date premiered: April 5, 1886
- Place premiered: Boston Museum

Prince Karl is a play written by A. C. Gunter in 1886. Gunter originally conceived the play as a drama, but actor Richard Mansfield thought it would work better as a comedy. Mansfield debuted in the title role at the Boston Museum on April 5, 1886. After a four-week run in Boston, Mansfield took it to Broadway, where it opened at the Madison Square Theatre on May 3. In 1887, Mansfield took his company to England, and he opened Prince Karl at the Lyceum Theatre in London's West End on October 10 of that year. The play became part of the repertory of Mansfield's company, and he continued to perform it until shortly before his death in 1907.

== Plot ==
Karl von Ahrmien is an impoverished German prince. He has agreed to marry Daphne Lowell, an older woman that he believes has a large fortune. However, he falls in love with her beautiful, widowed daughter-in-law, Florence Lowell. To escape his promised marriage, Karl fakes his own death, then pretends to be his own "foster brother", who happens to look identical to the prince. In this guise he takes a job as a courier working for Florence. She discovers his true identity, but keeps her knowledge a secret so he will remain in her service. Karl then discovers that the Lowells' supposed fortune is actually the property of one of Karl's own relatives who has died, and it is Karl's inheritance. With all of their secrets revealed, Florence and Karl agree to marry and share the fortune.

== Cast and characters ==
The characters and cast from the Boston Museum production are given below:

Cast of the debut production
Character	Cast
Prince Karl von Ahrmien	Richard Mansfield
Spartan Spotts	Charles Kent
J. Cool Dragon	William Seymour
Marky Davis	James Nolan
Mrs. Daphne Dabury Lowell	Mrs. J. R. Vincent
Mrs. Florence Lowell	Maida Craigen
Miss Alicia Euclid Lowell	Helen Dayne

== Reception ==
Reviewers were divided as to the merits of the play itself, but generally agreed that Mansfield gave a strong performance.
