= Her Bodyguard =

1933 film

- Directed by: William Beaudine
- Written by: Walter Deleon; Corey Ford; Francis Martin; Frank Partos; Ralph Spence
- Produced by: B.P. Schulberg
- Starring: Edmund Lowe; Wynne Gibson; Edward Arnold; Alan Dinehart
- Cinematography: Harry Fischbeck; Leon Shamroy
- Edited by: Jane Loring
- Production company: Paramount Pictures
- Distributed by: Paramount Pictures
- Release date: July 21, 1933
- Running time: 71 minutes
- Country: United States
- Language: English

Her Bodyguard is a 1933 American pre-Code comedy film directed by William Beaudine and starring Edmund Lowe, Wynne Gibson and Edward Arnold.

== Cast ==
- Edmund Lowe as Casey McCarthy
- Wynne Gibson as Margot Brienne
- Edward Arnold as Orson Bitzer
- Alan Dinehart as Lester Cunningham
- Marjorie White as Lita
- Johnny Hines as Ballyhoo
- Fuzzy Knight as Danny Dare
- Louise Beavers as Margot's Maid
- Arthur Housman as Drunk
- Blue Washington as Chauffeur (uncredited)

== Bibliography ==
- Marshall, Wendy L. William Beaudine: From Silents to Television. Scarecrow Press, 2005.
