= My Son Is Guilty =

1939 film by Charles Barton

- Directed by: Charles Barton
- Written by: Harold Shumate; Joseph Carole
- Story by: Karl Brown
- Produced by: Jack Fier
- Starring: Bruce Cabot; Jacqueline Wells; Harry Carey; Wynne Gibson
- Cinematography: Benjamin H. Kline
- Edited by: William Lyon
- Production company: Columbia Pictures Corporation
- Distributed by: Columbia Pictures Corporation
- Release date: December 28, 1939
- Running time: 63 minutes
- Country: United States
- Language: English

My Son Is Guilty is a 1939 American action adventure crime film directed by Charles Barton and produced by Jack Fier. It stars Bruce Cabot, Jacqueline Wells, Harry Carey and Wynne Gibson.

== Plot ==
Tim Kerry (Harry Carey), a veteran cop in the district of Hell's Kitchen, welcomes his son Ritzy (Bruce Cabot) after spending two years in prison. Ritzy has good friends, and his former wife Julia (Julie Bishop) is hopeful that things will go on the right track. But the head of the gang, Morelli (Wynne Gibson), knows that Ritzy has good talent for crime and makes a great offer that is very hard to refuse.

== Cast ==
- Bruce Cabot as Ritzy Kerry
- Julie Bishop as Julia Allen
- Glenn Ford as Barney
- Harry Carey as Officer Tim Kerry
- Edgar Buchanan as Dan, Bartender
- Wynne Gibson as Claire Morelli
- Bruce Bennett as Lefty
- Don Beddoe as Duke Mason
- Dick Curtis as Monk

Note: Bishop was still being billed under her real name, Jacqueline Wells.
