= Kendall Carly Browne =

American actress and television host (1918–2018)

- Born: May 31, 1918
- Died: January 26, 2018 (aged 99)
- Spouse: Herb Braverman
- Children: Bart Braverman; Chuck Braverman

Kendall Carly Browne (May 31, 1918 – January 26, 2018) was an American film and television actress and television host. Browne, whose professional career spanned decades, was best known for her film roles, including Dreamscape in 1984 and Pineapple Express in 2008, as well as television roles from the 1950s to 2000s including The Jack Benny Program, Beverly Hills, 90210, ER, CSI: Crime Scene Investigation, and My Name Is Earl. Until April 1974, Browne was known as Chuckie Bradley. She performed with that name for 28 years before changing it after consulting numerology, palm reading, psychic interpretation, and tarot cards.

== Biography ==
Born in Pennsylvania on May 31, 1918, Browne began her career as a receptionist at the Zeppo Marx Talent Agency before segueing into acting and on-air work. She was a high-fashion model before she began working on TV and said that she "easily went into commercials and on to sitcoms". She once was recognized for having made the most TV commercials in one year.

In 1952, she was hired by CBS when the television network first launched. Browne then hosted Four Star Theater on KECA-TV in Los Angeles. Other sources give the name of the program as Four Stages, broadcast on Mondays from 8:30 to 10:30 p.m., Pacific Time. Columnist Allen Rich wrote in a brief review, "The glamour is supplied by a lass named Chuckie Bradley, who acts as a sort of hostess. The kid's good in a pale blonde, different sort of way."

Browne's other professional activities included writing publicity material and designing fashion items of leather and fur.

== Personal life and death ==
Browne was married to Herb Braverman, a television producer, who died in 1958. They had two sons, actor Bart Braverman and filmmaker Chuck Braverman. She died from natural causes at her home in Indio, California, on January 26, 2018, at age 99.

== Filmography ==
Year	Title	Role	Notes
1975	I Wonder Who's Killing Her Now?		
1977	Red Light in the White House	Mrs. Lazar	
1980	Alligator	Ann	
1984	Fear City	Nurse #1	
1984	Dreamscape	Mrs. Matusik	
1986	3:15 the Moment of Truth	French teacher	
1988	Angel III: The Final Chapter	Gallery Woman	
2004	Soul Plane	Ticket Agent (Worldwide Air)	
2005	The Hand Job	Estelle	
2008	Pineapple Express	Old Woman	
