= Bart Braverman =

American actor

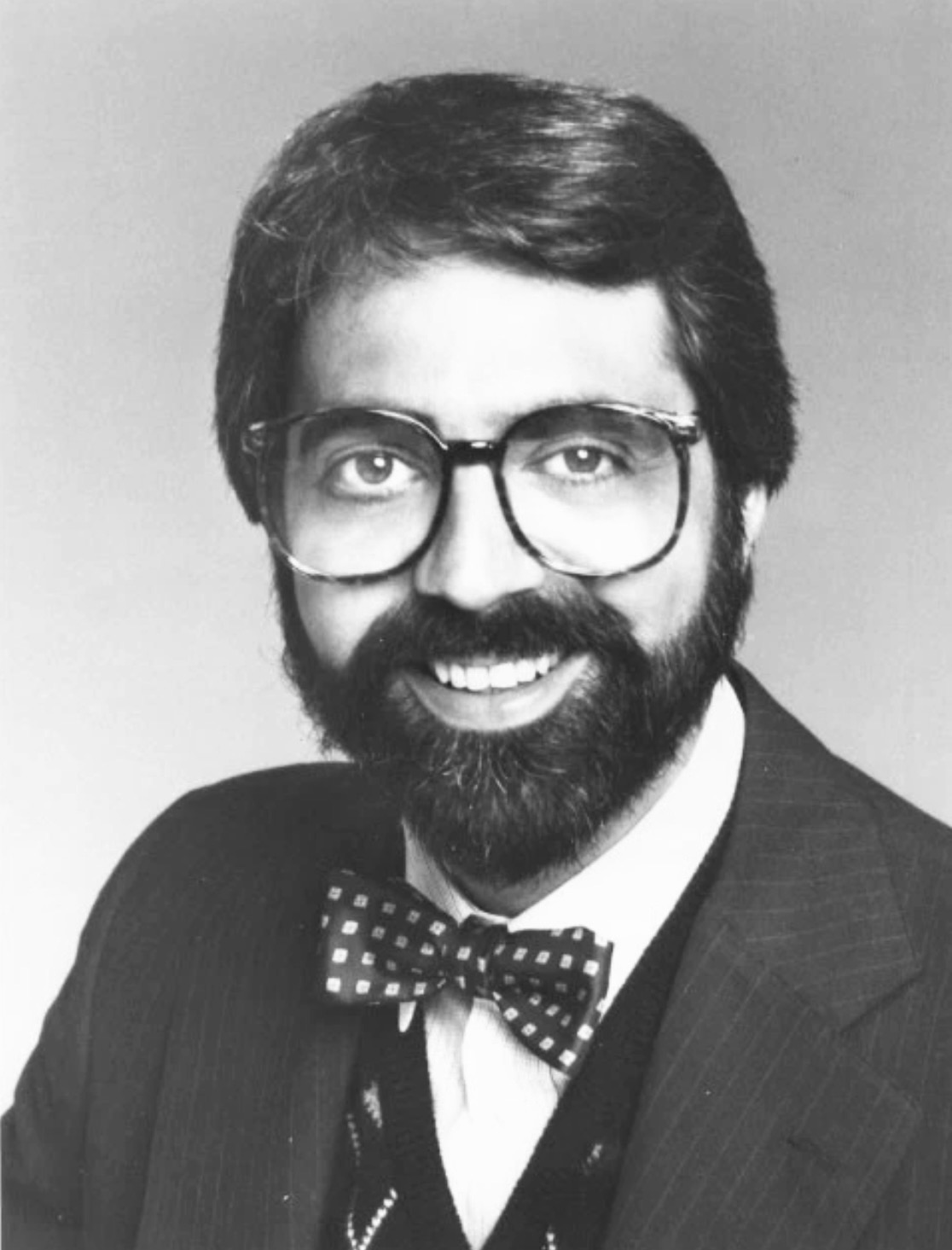
- Braverman in 1982
- Born: Los Angeles, California, U.S.
- Other name: Bart Bradley
- Occupation: Actor
- Years active: 1951–2017
- Mother: Kendall Carly Browne
- Relatives: Charles Braverman (brother)

Bart Braverman is an American former actor, best known for playing Binzer on the ABC primetime series Vega$ (1978–1981). Braverman has also guest starred on many television shows.

== Early life and education ==
Bart Braverman is the son of producer Herb Braverman and actress Kendall Carly Browne. His brother, Chuck Braverman, is a television director and producer.

Braverman was billed as Bart Bradley in many of his early roles.

After he graduated from Fairfax High School, Braverman attended the College of San Mateo, Marin College, and Sonoma State; he completed his studies at Carnegie Tech with a degree in drama. Before he became an actor, he worked at a variety of jobs, including busing dishes, delivering telephone books, parking cars, and working for Kelly Services.

== Career ==
Braverman made his professional acting debut as a child actor in milk commercials, along with his brother. From 1955 to 1962, the child then teen Braverman appeared on single episodes of various television series, including I Love Lucy, Have Gun – Will Travel and Wagon Train. He played an Indian boy in Rawhide, S2 E8 "Incident of the Haunted Hills" which aired 11/5/1959, credited as Bart Bradley. His film roles include two credited roles, for Cell 2455 Death Row (1955) and 20 Million Miles to Earth (1957). His last pre-adult credit, also marking his last credit as Bart Bradley, was a 1962 episode of Bachelor Father.

Braverman did not return to acting until he was 29, appearing in a 1975 episode of Columbo. He appeared steadily on television, with occasional film roles—including Alligator (1980) and 8 Heads in a Duffel Bag (1997)—for the next 42 years. Other television roles included episodes of Seinfeld, M*A*S*H, and Shameless, and a voice role on Fangface.

Braverman may be best known for his main cast role playing Dan Tanna's field assistant and legman, Bobby "Binzer" Borso, on Vega$, from 1978 to 1981. in 1979 he expressed frustration with the way the character had been developed. Braverman said that writers could have brought out many characteristics of Binzer, "But when they began to write him into subsequent episodes of the show they took only two of those facets — the fact that he is stupid and the fact that he is cowardly — and that's all they use."

He also had a co-starring role in the 1982–83 television series The New Odd Couple.

Braverman also has made frequent appearances on the game show Match Game during its run in syndication from 1979 to 1982. In 1979 and 1980, he also appeared on the game shows Password Plus with Vega$ co-star Robert Urich. In 1984, he appeared on Match Game-Hollywood Squares Hour.

Braverman's stage credits include the Broadway production of Godspell (1972).

== Personal life ==
Braverman was married for eight years and then divorced.

== Filmography ==
=== Films ===
Year	Title	Role	Notes
1955	Cell 2455 Death Row	Young Whit	credited as Bart Bradley
1956	Somebody Up There Likes Me	Boy	uncredited
1957	This Could Be the Night	Boy in Class	uncredited
1957	20 Million Miles to Earth	Pepe	credited as Bart Bradley
1957	The Hired Gun	Pablo	uncredited
1958	Voice in the Mirror	Gene Devlin	uncredited
1976	The Great Texas Dynamite Chase	Freddie	
1980	Alligator	Kemp	
1990	White Palace	additional voice	voice role
1999	Running Red	Mercier	Direct-to-video
2000	Something to Sing About	Ahmeed	TV movie
2015	Aguruphobia	Ahmed	

=== Television ===
Year	Title	Role	Notes
1956	The Bob Hope Chevy Show	Himself	Episode: "Kim Novak, Pearl Bailey, Vic Damone, Ken Murray" (credited as Bart Bradley)
1956	I Love Lucy	Giuseppe	Episode: "Lucy Gets Homesick in Italy" (credited as Bart Bradley)
1959	Have Gun – Will Travel	Pedro	Season 1 Episode 39: "The Statue of San Sebastian" (credited as Bart Bradley)
1959	77 Sunset Strip	Guido Orsini	Season 1 Episode 29: "A Bargain in Tombs" (credited as Bart Bradley)
1960	Lawman	Dennis Deaver	Season 2 Episode 20: “The Kids” (credited as Bart Bradley)
1961	Wagon Train	Evening Star	Episode: "The Patience Miller Story" (credited as Bart Bradley)
1975	Columbo	2nd picketer	Episode: "A Case of Immunity"
1976	M*A*S*H	Private Habib	Episode: "Dear Sigmund"
1976–78	Magic Mongo	Ace	
1978–81	Vega$	Bobby "Binzer" Borso	Main cast
1978–80	Fangface	Puggsy (voice)	32 episodes
1978-1982	Match Game	Himself	Appeared on 37 weeks between 1978-1982
1979-1981	Password Plus and Super Password	Himself	Aired: Aired: April 23-27, 1979; December 10-14, 1979; April 17; 20-23, 1981; September 07-11, 1981
1982–83	The New Odd Couple	Roy	Main cast
1984	Match Game-Hollywood Squares Hour	Himself	Aired February 27-March 2, 1984
1991	Beverly Hills, 90210	Mr. Parker	Episode: "It's Only a Test"
1997	Seinfeld	Zubin	Episode: "The Betrayal"
1998	From the Earth to the Moon	Older Sahjid	Miniseries, Episode: "Le voyage dans la lune"
2000	Beyond Belief: Fact or Fiction	Funeral Director	Episode: "Two Sisters"
2000	The West Wing	Shapiro	Episode: "20 Hours in L.A."
2007	The Suite Life of Zack and Cody	Ambassador	Episode: "Aptitude"
2011	Shameless	Doorman	Episode: "Frank Gallagher: Loving Husband, Devoted Father"
2012	Castle	Cabbie	Episode: "After Hours"
