= The Florodora Girl =

1930 film

- Theatrical release poster
- Directed by: Harry Beaumont
- Screenplay by: Ralph Spence; Al Boasberg; Robert E. Hopkins
- Story by: Gene Markey
- Produced by: Marion Davies
- Starring: Marion Davies; Lawrence Gray; Walter Catlett; Louis John Bartels; Ilka Chase
- Cinematography: Oliver T. Marsh
- Edited by: Carl Pierson
- Music by: Herbert Stothart
- Color process: Black and white (with 2-strip of Technicolor finale)
- Production companies: Cosmopolitan Productions; Metro-Goldwyn-Mayer
- Distributed by: Metro-Goldwyn-Mayer
- Release date: May 31, 1930
- Running time: 79 minutes
- Country: United States
- Language: English

The Florodora Girl is a 1930 American pre-Code drama film directed by Harry Beaumont and written by Ralph Spence, Al Boasberg and Robert E. Hopkins. The film stars Marion Davies, Lawrence Gray, Walter Catlett, and Ilka Chase. The film was released on May 31, 1930, by Metro-Goldwyn-Mayer.

== Plot ==
The Florodora Girl (1930)

It's 1899 and Florodora is the hottest show on Broadway. Carriages line up around the block waiting for valet service. While the music and drama are a draw, most male patrons are there to see the beautiful Florodora chorus girls. Some have seen the show a dozen times. Daisy is one of the Florodora girls and a member of show’s female sextet. She is also the only original Florodora girl. The other female members of the cast have left to marry one of the wealthy male patrons. Daisy’s turn is overdue. She’s willing to marry, as long as he’s the right fellow, and for Daisy that fellow is Jack Vibart. Her friends, Fanny and Maud, newer members of the female sextet, advise Daisy that the best way to attract a wealthy suitor is to “be difficult” and play hard-to-get. But when she shares her interest in Jack Vibart, Fanny and Maud are patently against him. Jack Vibrant has no interest in marrying a girl like Daisy, they warn her. He eats chorus girls for lunch. Ironically, a short while later, Daisy receives a huge bouquet of flowers from Jack along with a request to join him in his carriage. She’s thrilled at first, but eventually heeds the advice of her friends and rejects the bouquet and his offer. Instead, Daisy reluctantly accepts an offer from her friend George Smith to ride on his tandem bike.

George is a poor cigar shop worker who would gladly marry Daisy. Unfortunately, while Daisy values his friendship, she does not love George. George takes Daisy on his bike to the tavern to fetch her father, who is a bit drunk. Daisy takes Dad home to their small tenement in the poorest part of town. Once home, Dad offers her a drink and the pair chat while Daisy thumbs through a magazine. She stops on photo of Jack Vibart and his horse Firebird. Her father admires the horse, but Daisy admires Jack. Daisy’s father has seen Jack at the racetrack and notes he’s decent enough for an upper crust fellow. Dad also won a whopping $18 betting on Jack’s horse in the Kentucky Derby.

A few days later, Daisy and the other Florodora girls go to the beach. The women don flamboyant turn-of the century bathing dresses which cover most of their bodies. They hope, however, that their bare calves might attract a few wealthy prospects. The women join the men for a swim and Daisy strays far from shore. She notices Jack swimming nearby, pretends to struggle in the water, and screams for help. Her stunt causes Jack to believe he has rescued her. "How can I ever thank you?" she feigns. Later, Daisy and her friends enjoy a picnic lunch where Daisy leads a group of male singers in a humorous medley of songs popular at the turn of the nineteenth century. Her wild exaggerated conducting, silly dancing and vocal interventions are a hit with the crowd. After the song, Daisy and Jack find each other on a large outdoor swing. The pair flirt while swinging higher and higher until the rope breaks sending the couple through the air and into a nearby bush.

On January 2, 1900, a football game took place between Yale and Columbia. "Boola Boola," Yale’s football song, played as the crowd gathered. Spectators stood in front or watched from behind atop horse-drawn carriages. Forward passes were not used in the game at this time. One team used a moving V-formation surrounding the ball carrier. The team then lifted the ball carrier over the defenders. Jack was among the carriage viewers near Fanny and Maud. They informed him that Daisy was busy with multiple suitors and could not attend the game with him. Jack was disappointed until he saw George and Daisy arrive on a tandem bike. He felt snubbed because Daisy had declined his invitation to attend with George. Daisy dismounted the bike and cheered for both teams.

Later at the game Jack spots Harry Fontaine, a crooked gambler who had a row with Jack when Jack’s horse won the Kentucky Derby. Harry spots George and Daisy calls George over to speak with him. George leaves Daisy to speak with Harry, and after a short chat, Harry offers George a drink from his flask. George accepts and quickly becomes drunk. With George out of the way, Harry makes advances on Daisy. Daisy protests and soon Jack intervenes and offers to take Daisy home himself. Daisy happily accepts and leaves with Jack.

On the carriage ride home Daisy learns Jack wanted to take her to the football game but Fanny and Maud intervened. Daisy confesses that Fanny and Maud have exaggerated Daisy’s romantic prospects. The two flirt and grow more in love until Jack promises to spend every day with Daisy. Later they drive past an elegant older lady and a young girl. Jack tells Daisy the beautiful lady is his mother, and the young woman is just a girl he knows. When he arrives home, Jack speaks with his mother about Daisy. She wants him to stop his philandering with chorus girls and marry Constance – the pretty young girl spotted earlier in the carriage who is revealed to be Jack’s fiancé. Jack promises his mother that he will marry Constance in June – the month for weddings. "What about the chorus girl?" his mother asks. "She is charming, but a man in my position doesn’t take a girl like her seriously," he responds reassuringly.

Despite is assurance to his mother, Jack and Daisy continue to spend time together, falling deeper in love. One sunny afternoon Jack takes Daisy for a ride on the latest invention – a horseless carriage. There are a few fits and starts, but Jack manages to keep the machine running. Later the couple share a romantic meal and Jack sings lovingly to Daisy – "You’re just my kind of girl". Later Jack offers Daisy a jeweled bracelet and suggests she should let him pay for her to live in a nice apartment close to his home. She’s offended by his offer believing he intends to keep her as a mistress. The pair quarrel and Daisy storms off.

Back at the Florodora theater, Daisy informs Fanny and Maud that she wants nothing to do with Jack Vibart. Later, Rumblesham “Rummy”, a refined English gentleman, invites Daisy to a fashionable party – a society ball hosted by the Commodore and his wife. Daisy would love to go but has nothing to wear. Fanny and Maude come to her rescue and gather an elegant but over-the-top dress from the theater’s wardrobe collection and alter it to fit Daisy. Daisy and Rummy arrive at the ball and Daisy does her best to mingle with society. Unfortunately, the back of her dress comes unbuttoned near her rear. Mr. De Boer, a kind older gentleman, notices her dress, helps button her up, and offers to help by giving her a warning “Johny’s out” if it happens again. Of course, it’s not long before Jack turns up and wants to speak with Daisy, but she refuses to talk with him. Daisy dances and tries to avoid Jack when her dress fails again. Fortunately, Mr. De Boer is there to help as promised.

Later Daisy spots Jack and Constance dancing and learns from Rummy that they are engaged to be married. Daisy finally speaks with Jack, and he confesses that Daisy is the only girl he loves. He doesn’t want to marry Constance but is only doing so to please his mother who values Constance’s wealth. Jack promises to leave Constance and marry Daisy. He shares his plan to bet his family’s fortune on his racehorse so he can afford his own business. He places the bet. Firebird runs well, leads the race until the end when he finishes second. Jack loses his family’s fortune.

Jack does not want to worry Daisy about his financial misfortune as he and Daisy celebrate their engagement with the cast of the Florodora. She says how proud she is to be a Florodora girl and invites them all to the wedding. Later, Mrs. Vibart invites Daisy to her home. Daisy is delighted to speak with her future mother-in-law until she learns that Jack has lost most of the family’s fortune. Daisy promises Mrs. Vibart that she and Jack will manage. Mrs. Vibart, however, asks Daisy to give up Jack so he can marry Constance, whose family wealth would solve the Vibart’s financial woes. Daisy agrees – reassuring Mrs. Vibart that Jack would never be happy married to a girl like Daisy.

Back at the theater, Lulu, one of the other Florodora girls, discusses Daisy’s broken engagement and claims Daisy dumped Jack because he’s broke. Fanny invites Lulu outside to tell her something important while Maud guards the door. The pair step outside and screaming is heard. When they return it’s clear Fanny has beaten Lulu. Fanny and Maud walk away to comfort Daisy. Later, Jack begs to speak with Daisy, but she refuses. Instead, she goes to a slumming party at the bowery with Harry Fontaine – the gambler who accosted her at the football game. Harry encourages Daisy to drink, but she is reluctant and melancholy. However, when she spots Jack entering, she lights up, grabs the bottle, jumps on the table, and pretends to be having a grand time. Jack confronts Daisy, asks why she is acting that way and pleads for her to listen. She rebukes him harshly saying she was only interested in his money. When he reluctantly leaves, she breaks down in tears.

Four months later, the Florodora girls are offstage preparing to perform. Fanny and Maud tell Daisy they are engaged and show off their rings. Daisy also learns that Jack has launched a successful business selling horseless carriages. The show continues and the sextet enters the stage with a male sextet and perform "Tell Me Pretty Maiden" from Florodora. Daisy happily sings but is stunned when she spots Jack in the audience. She is hopeful but unsure what to do. When she looks again his seat is empty – Jack is gone. After the first chorus Daisy finds Jack offstage where he pleads with her to listen to him. When performance continues, Jack follows Daisy onstage and takes the place of one of the male singers. Daisy continues to perform, and the song lyrics are incorporated into their confrontation. Jack confesses his love and asks Daisy to marry him as she sings the final line – "I must love someone, and it might as well be you." A delighted Jack assumes Daisy has accepted his marriage proposal. Once offstage, Daisy is fuming and worries his antics will get her fired. Jack persists and carries Daisy away. “I must finish the show!” she protests. Her protests continue until Jack takes her outside where Jack’s mother is waiting in a horse drawn sleigh. Mrs. Vibart smiles and tells Daisy, "My dear, this time we have come for you." Daisy is finally accepted by the Vibart family as the sleigh carries the happy trio away.

== Cast ==
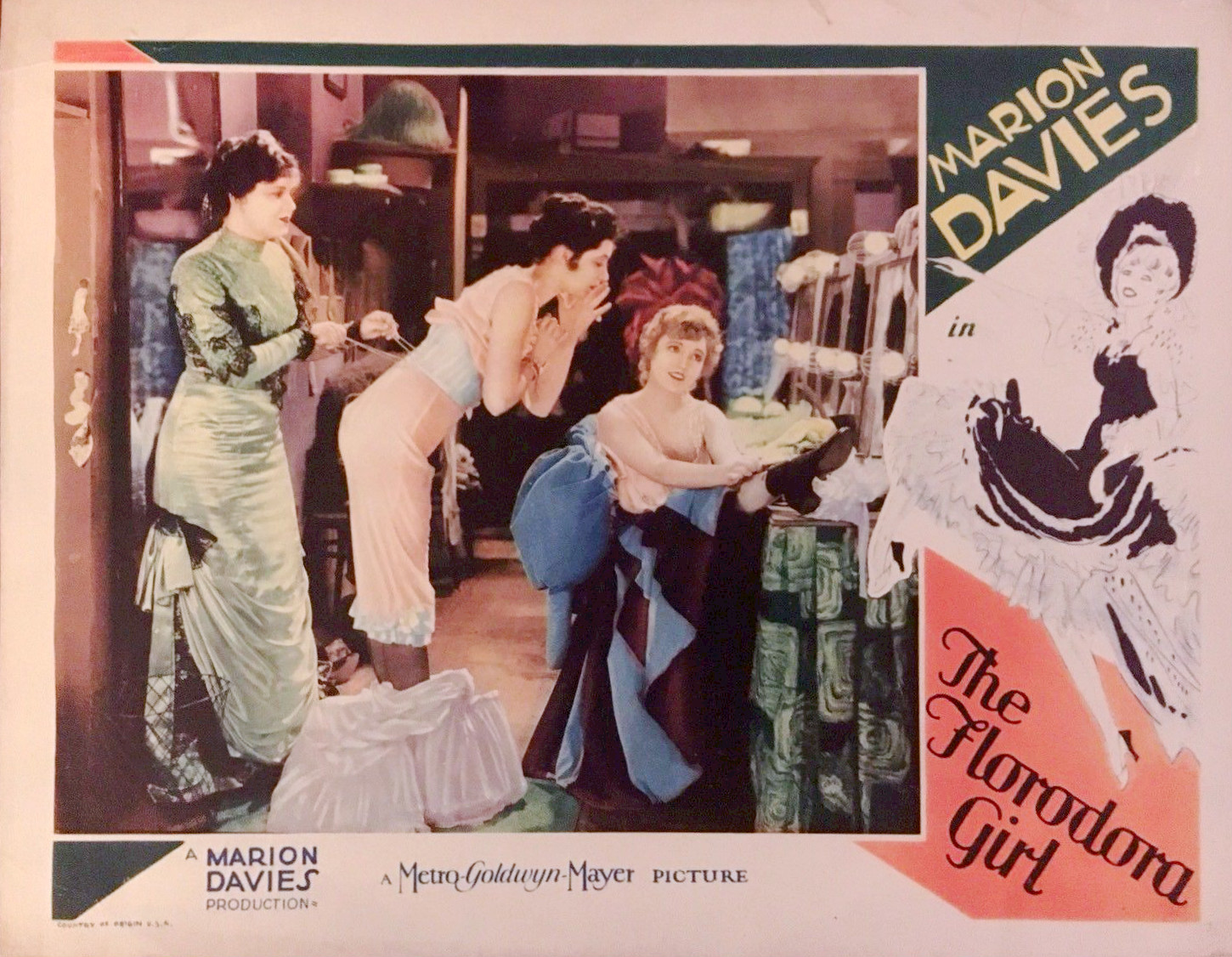
Lobby card

- Marion Davies as Daisy
- Lawrence Gray as Jack
- Walter Catlett as De Boer
- Louis John Bartels as Hemingway
- Ilka Chase as Fanny
- Vivien Oakland as Maud
- Jed Prouty as Old Man Dell
- Claud Allister as Rumblesham
- Sam Hardy as Fontaine
- Nance O'Neil as Mrs. Vibart
- Robert Bolder as Commodore
- Jane Keithley as Constance
- Maude Turner Gordon as Mrs. Caraway
- George Chandler as Georgie Smith
- Anita Louise as Vibart Child
- Mary Jane Irving as Vibart Child

== Preservation status ==
Released and shown periodically on TCM.

The 2-strip Technicolor finale has survived including "Tell Me, Pretty Maiden" from the musical "Florodora".

== See also ==
- List of early color feature films
