= Wynne Gibson =

American actress (1898–1987)

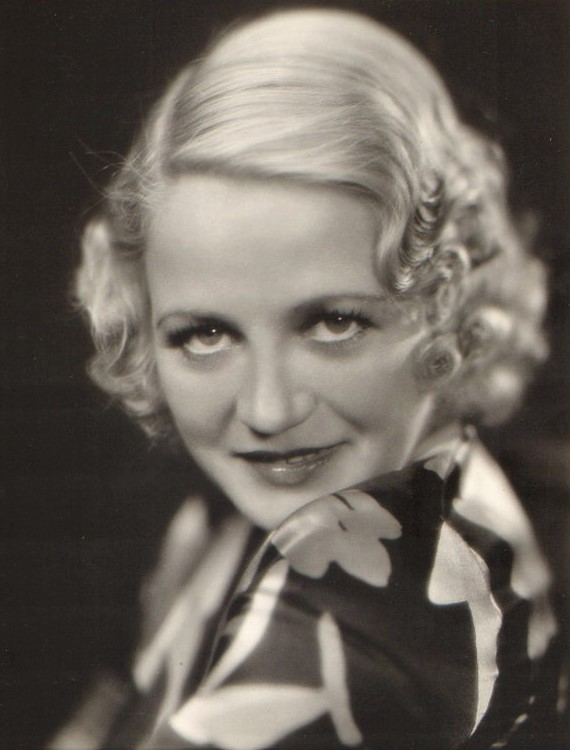
- Publicity photo, 1931
- Born: Winifred Elaine Gibson; July 3, 1898; New York City, U.S.
- Died: May 15, 1987 (aged 88); Laguna Niguel, California, U.S.
- Occupation: Actress
- Years active: 1929–1956
- Spouse: John Gallaudet (m. 1927; div. 1930)

Winifred Elaine "Wynne" Gibson (July 3, 1898 – May 15, 1987) was an American actress of the 1930s.

== Early years ==
Gibson was born in New York City, the daughter of Frank W. Gibson and Elaine Coffin Gibson. Her father was an efficiency expert, and her mother was an authorized Christian Science healer. She attended Wadleigh High School for Girls in New York City.

At one point during her youth, she ran away from home with a touring play troupe, acting with the group in three cities before her father found her.

== Stage ==
Gibson was a member of Frederick Santley's Melody Maids and Ray Raymond's Melody Charmers. She toured in the Ritz Girls show, in which she and Billie Vernon performed a sister act. Gibson was seen in vaudeville as part of The Melody Charmers. Her Broadway credits include Jarnegan (1928) and When You Smile (1925). In 1955–1956, she served as chair of the Equity Library Theatre.

== Film ==
Early in her career, Gibson had a small part in a film but had no special interest in appearing before the camera. It was the stage that interested her and she began her stage career in chorus and was soon playing leads. She toured Europe then returned to America and tried for a dramatic part but failed and returned to musical comedy. Paramount signed her when about to film Nothing But the Truth (1929), starting her success which continued in 50 films between 1929 and 1956 although many were B movies.

== Personal life ==
Gibson had a brief marriage to a stage manager. After that, she married John Gallaudet, an actor, in 1927. They divorced in 1930. She was a long-time companion of former Warner Brothers actress Beverly Roberts.

== Death ==
Gibson died in 1987 of a cerebral thrombosis in Laguna Niguel, California.

== Filmography ==
- Nothing But the Truth (1929) - Sabel Jackson
- Children of Pleasure (1930) - Emma Gray
- The Fall Guy (1930) - Lottie Quinlan
- The Gang Buster (1931) - Zella Cameron
- June Moon (1931) - Lucille Sears
- Man of the World (1931) - Irene Hoffa
- The Stolen Jools (1931) - Reporter
- City Streets (1931) - Agnes
- Kick In (1931) - Myrtle Sylvester
- The Road to Reno (1931) - Mrs. It-Ritch
- Ladies of the Big House (1931) - Susie Thompson
- Two Kinds of Women (1932) - Phyllis Adrian
- The Strange Case of Clara Deane (1932) - Clara Deane
- Lady and Gent (1932) - Puff Rogers
- Night After Night (1932) - Iris Dawn
- If I Had a Million (1932) - Violet Smith (uncredited)
- The Sign of the Cross (1932) - Orgy Guest (uncredited)
- The Devil Is Driving (1932) - 'Silver'
- The Crime of the Century (1933) - Freda Brandt
- Emergency Call (1933) - Mabel
- Her Bodyguard (1933) - Margot Brienne
- Aggie Appleby Maker of Men (1933) - Agnes 'Aggie' Appleby
- The Television Follies (1933) - Cutie
- The Crosby Case (1934) - Lynn Ashton
- Sleepers East (1934) - Lena Karelson
- I Give My Love (1934) - Judy Blair
- The Captain Hates the Sea (1934) - Mrs. Jeddock
- Gambling (1934) - Maizie Fuller
- The Crouching Beast (1935) - Gail Dunbar
- Admirals All (1935) - Gloria Gunn
- Come Closer, Folks (1936) - Mae
- Racketeers in Exile (1937) - 'Babe' DeVoe
- Michael O'Halloran (1937) - Grace Mintum
- Trapped by G-Men (1937) - Alice Segar, Posing as Mrs. Donovan
- Gangs of New York (1938) - Orchid
- Flirting with Fate (1938) - Bertha
- Miracle on Main Street (1939) - Sade Blake
- My Son Is Guilty (1939) - Claire Morelli
- Cafe Hostess (1940) - Annie
- Forgotten Girls (1940) - Frances Wingate
- Double Cross (1941) - Fay Saunders
- A Man's World (1942) - Blossom Donovan
- The Falcon Strikes Back (1943) - Geraldine Lipton
- Mystery Broadcast (1943) - Eve Stanley
