= Smith and Dale =

Vaudeville comedy duo

Charlie Dale (left) and Joe Smith in a comedy sketch, filmed for Soundies movie jukeboxes (1941)

Smith and Dale were an American vaudeville comedy duo. They consisted of Joe Smith (born Joseph Sultzer on February 17, 1884 – February 22, 1981) and Charlie Dale (born Charles Marks on September 6, 1881 – November 16, 1971), who both grew up on the Lower East Side of Manhattan. Beginning in their adolescence, their career spanned the majority of their lives, with the two performing together continuously for more than seventy years.

== Early life and work ==
Sultzer and Marks met as teenagers in the fall of 1898, when they accidentally ran into each other while cycling. Joe was cycling north on Eldridge Street on Manhattan's Lower East Side, while Charlie was cycling east on Delancey. As they argued over whose fault it was, the shopkeeper who rented the bikes said, "You two sound like Weber and Fields." Initially performing under the name Sultzer and Marks, they later renamed their act to Smith and Dale because a local printer gave them a good deal on business cards that read "Smith & Dale". These were initially intended for a team that had since decided on a different name – Moran and Mack, unrelated to the later group of the same name. Joe Sultzer became Joe Smith, and Charlie Marks became Charlie Dale.

== The Avon Comedy Four ==
Beginning in 1902, Smith and Dale partnered with singing comedians Will Lester and Jack Coleman to form a group called The Avon Comedy Four. Initially booked for a series of appearances in the Catskills region, the act was so successful that performances were continued in many other clubs for years after. Aside from Smith and Dale, membership of this group changed often over the years. Known performers included Irving Kaufman, Harry Goodwin, E. Rash, and Charles Adams. The act became one of the more successful comedy turns in vaudeville. For over 15 years, the group were top-of-the-bill performers on Broadway and appeared in the 1916 show Why Worry? The foursome made commercial recordings replicating their stage act, as in a 1917 restaurant sketch:

SMITH: One cheese sandwich! The cheese should be neutral.
DALE: One sandwich, with American cheese.

SMITH: Where's the manager?
DALE: He's not here. He went across the street to a good restaurant.

However, this would prove to be the group's peak. While they continued to perform throughout the 1920s, this only resulted in a single record being published during this decade, and they proved unable to secure many lucrative contracts or gigs. This was contrasted by Smith and Dale's popularity as a duo, which had continued to rise throughout the same period. By 1930, Smith and Dale had grown tired of the act, and so, after 28 years of performing, dissolved the Avon Comedy Four to focus exclusively on their career as a duo. Smith and Dale took up where the foursome left off, playing Broadway and vaudeville (including the Palace Theatre, considered the pinnacle of stage venues) while also beginning their movie career. Both used a heavy Jewish dialect, with Smith speaking in a deep, pessimistic voice and Dale in a high, wheedling tenor.

== "Dr. Kronkheit and His Only Living Patient" ==
During the 1920s, Smith and Dale became famous for their signature sketch "Doctor Kronkheit and His Only Living Patient". The name of the doctor is an inside joke: Smith and Dale, both being Jewish, named the physician Kronkheit, which is Yiddish and German [Krankheit] for "sickness".

Dr. Kronkheit (played by Dale) is greeted by skeptical patient Smith:

SMITH: Are you a doctor?
DALE: I'm a doctor.
SMITH: I'm dubious.
DALE: I'm glad to know you, Mr. Dubious.

Most of the sketch has Dr. Kronkheit trying to determine the patient's problem:

SMITH: Look at this, doctor.
DALE: Look at --- oh, that there? Did you ever have that before?
SMITH: Yes, I did.
DALE: Well, you got it again!

SMITH: I can't sleep at night. I walk around all night.
DALE: Ah! You're a somnambulist!
SMITH: No, I'm a night watchman.

SMITH: I got rheumatism on the back of my neck. It's a bad place to have rheumatism, on the back of my neck.
DALE: No, no, where would you want a better place than on the back of your neck?
SMITH: On the back of your neck. My neck hurts me, doctor; it's terrible.
DALE: Oh, well, sit down and open your neck.

Smith tries to object.

DALE: Mister, please, I got no patience!
SMITH: I shouldn't have been here either!

The patient explains that he has already seen a doctor:

SMITH: He told me I had snew in my blood.
DALE: What did he told you?
SMITH: He told me I had snew in my blood.
DALE: Snew? What's snew?
SMITH: Nothing. What's new with you?

SMITH (reacting to Dale spitting on his stethoscope:) Doctor, what is that you're doing?
DALE: Sterilization.

DALE: Now inhale, please.
SMITH: What?
DALE: Inhale.
SMITH: What?
DALE: Inhale! I would like to see you.
SMITH: Inhale I would like to see you!

DALE: The whole trouble with you is you need eyeglasses.
SMITH: Eyeglasses?! I suppose if I had a headache I'd need an umbrella.

Dr. Kronkheit's fee is $10:

SMITH: For what?
DALE: For my advice.
SMITH: Ten dollars for your advice?
DALE: That's right.
SMITH: Well, Doctor, here is two dollars; take it. That's my advice!

In 1951, the Dr. Kronkheit routine was filmed for posterity (in color) for the RKO Radio Pictures musical Two Tickets to Broadway.

== Movie appearances ==
Smith and Dale's act can be seen in the feature movie The Heart of New York (1932). They also ran through some of their sketches in Paramount Pictures and Vitaphone short subjects. Their "firemen" sketch, in which Joe and Charlie are lazy firemen who hardly pay attention when someone reports a fire, was filmed as The False Alarm Fire Co. (1929) and again as Fun in a Fire House (1936). Another routine was "The Gypsy National Bank," in which fly-by-night banker Joe is questioned by prospective depositor Charlie; this was included in the vaudeville-revue short Vitaphone Diversions (1937).

In 1938, Smith and Dale starred in a pair of two-reel comedies for Columbia Pictures, both produced and directed by comedian Charley Chase: A Nag in the Bag (they operate a drive-in restaurant and gamble on a horse race) and Mutiny on the Body (they visit a shady sanitarium for a rest cure). The team made no other movies for the studio; executive producer Jules White didn't care for their dialect shtick and didn't renew their contract.

Smith and Dale also made three Soundies in 1941. In a rare exception to Soundies' all-musical policy, Smith and Dale did spoken-comedy routines.

Laurel and Hardy were scheduled to appear in the Technicolor musical Two Tickets to Broadway (1951), but scheduling problems forced them to withdraw. They were replaced by Smith and Dale, appearing as Leo and Harry, the proprietors of the Palace Deli.

== Longevity ==
Smith and Dale continued working as a team in stage, radio, nightclub, film, and television productions. They were frequent guests on New York-based variety shows like Cavalcade of Stars (doing the "firemen" sketch on live television, with Art Carney as the frantic fire victim) and "The Steve Allen Show" of September 2, 1956, with Louis Nye as the fire victim. They also played The Ed Sullivan Show. Smith and Dale still performed in the 1960s, including an appearance at New York's Donnell Library Center.

The partnership, known among entertainers as the longest in show-business history, endured until Charlie Dale's death at age 90, on November 16, 1971. Smith continued to perform, mainly in guest appearances on television sitcoms, until his death on February 22, 1981, at the age of 97.

Late in their lives, both men resided in the Lillian Booth Actors Home in Englewood, New Jersey.

Smith and Dale are buried in the same cemetery plot, with a common headstone. The gravestone notes the name of the three people buried there, Dale and his wife Mollie and the widowed Smith. Smith is identified only by his show business name of Joe Smith, and his partner is listed as Charles Dale Marks, and Dale's wife is listed as Mollie Dale Marks. The larger printing higher on the stone states "Smith & Dale", to which Smith added the words "Booked Solid".

== Works based on Smith and Dale ==
The longevity of the comedy team in Neil Simon's play and film The Sunshine Boys was inspired by Smith and Dale.

Gordon Lish's Extravaganza: A Joke Book (G.P. Putnam's Sons, 1989) is an avant-garde novel inspired by Smith and Dale's act.

== See also ==
- Bright Lights of 1944
- Lillian Booth Actors Home
