= The Heart of New York (film) =

1932 film

- Directed by: Mervyn LeRoy
- Written by: Arthur Caesar; Houston Branch
- Based on: play Mendel, Inc. by David Freedman
- Starring: Joe Smith; Charlie Dale; George Sidney
- Cinematography: James Van Trees
- Edited by: Terry Morse
- Music by: Leo F. Forbstein
- Production company: Warner Bros. Pictures
- Distributed by: Warner Bros. Pictures; The Vitaphone Corp.
- Release date: March 26, 1932
- Running time: 73-74 minutes
- Country: United States
- Language: English
- Budget: $201,000
- Box office: $240,000

The Heart of New York is a 1932 American pre-Code comedy film starring the vaudeville team of Smith & Dale and George Sidney. It was directed by Mervyn LeRoy and based on the Broadway play Mendel, Inc. by David Freedman.

== Plot ==
The plumber Mendel Marantz, a passionate inventor, hasn't much luck and a family that doesn't understand him. He finally strikes it rich with a dishwashing machine he invented. He finds an investor, Gassenheim, and begins to make his way up in the world. But Mendel's troubles are not over; his family doesn't share his dream to become the landlord of the house where they live on New York's Lower East Side. They prefer to move uptown to Park Avenue and adapt to how rich people live. Mendel's ideas for the house are not forgotten. The men he once told how he wished to transform the building take on the work of renovating it, with every detail he planned. Neighbours and visitors come to see the house and the new, beautiful penthouse. His wife and his children are still in Park Avenue and when Gassenheim stops paying royalties to Mrs. Marantz, she and the children come home, to find that Mendel is close to losing everything.

== Cast ==
- Joe Smith as Sam Shtrudel
- Charles Dale as Bernard Schnaps
- George Sidney as Mendel Marantz
- Ruth Hall as Lillian Marantz
- Aline MacMahon as Bessie, the Neighbor
- Anna Appel as Mrs. Zelde Marantz
- Donald Cook as Milton
- Oscar Apfel as Otto Gassenheim
- Harold Waldridge as Jakie Marantz (as Harold Waldrige)
- Marion Byron as Mimi Marantz
- George MacFarlane as Mr. Marshall
- Ann Brody as Mrs. Nussbaum
- Charles Coleman as Mendel's Butler

== Box office ==
According to Warner Bros. records, the film earned $198,000 in the U.S. and $42,000 elsewhere.
