= Irving Kaufman (singer) =

American singer and vaudeville performer (1890–1976)

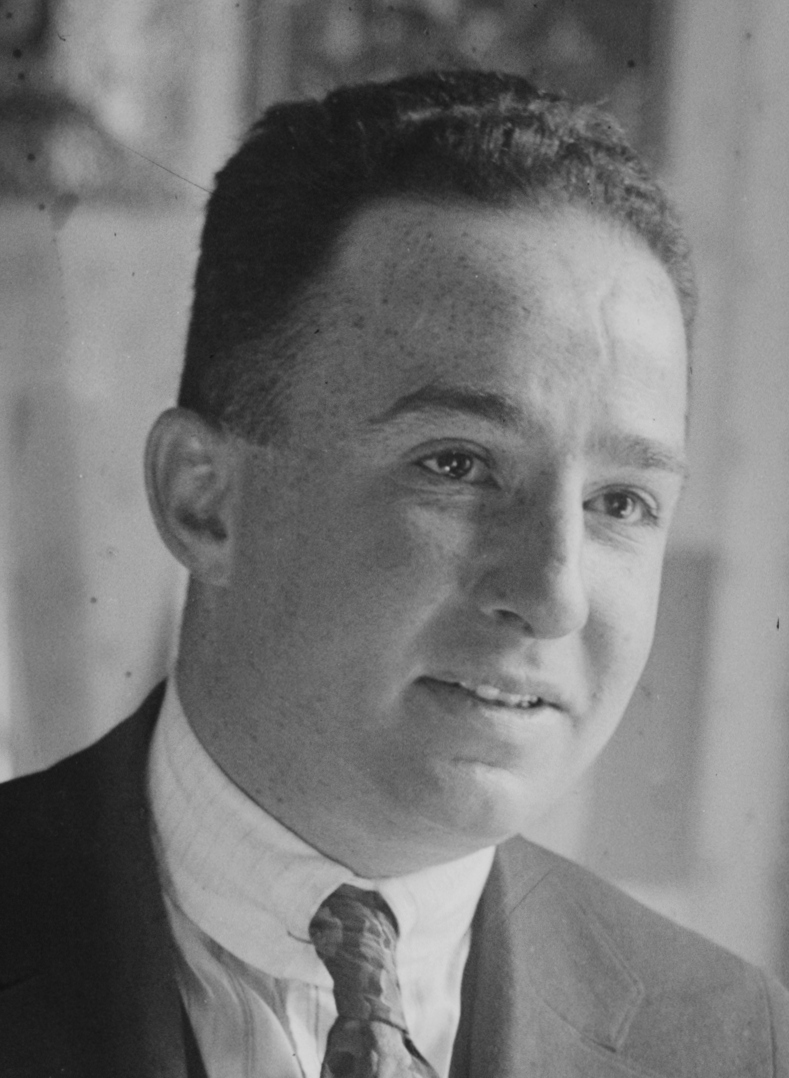
- Kaufman circa 1919

Background information
- Born: Isidore Kaufman; February 8, 1890; Syracuse, New York, United States
- Died: January 3, 1976 (aged 85) Indio, California, United States
- Occupation: Singer
- Instrument: Vocals
- Years active: 1915–1950
- Labels: Victor; Columbia; Edison; Gennett; Aeolian; Banner; Oriole; Vocalion

Irving Kaufman (February 8, 1890 – January 3, 1976) was a prolific American early twentieth century singer, recording artist and vaudeville performer.

== Life and career ==
Kaufman was born Isidore Kaufman in Syracuse, New York, the son of Russian Jewish immigrants. He was a member of The Kaufman Brothers, along with his brothers Phillip and Jack.

From 1913 through 1919 Kaufman was part of The Avon Comedy Four, a popular comedy and music group that was formed in 1902. Two of the group's members went on to fame as Smith and Dale. Kaufman began recording in 1914, and recorded for Victor, Columbia, Vocalion, Gennett, Edison, Harmony, as well as all of the dime labels (Banner, Perfect, etc.). Early in his career, when recording for Edison and Victor, he recorded under his own name, but he also used a number of (non-Jewish-sounding) aliases including 'Tom Frawley'. Sometimes, as in the case of several of his 1927 "Broadway Bell-Hops" vocals, he was merely credited as "Vocal Chorus". He was often credited as "vocal refrain by George Beaver" on the dime store labels.

Kaufman was a singer in the vaudeville style, and although he was not considered a jazz singer, he nonetheless sang on recordings accompanied by some of the foremost jazz figures of the 1920s, including Leon "Bix" Beiderbecke, Frank Trumbauer, the Dorsey Brothers, Red Nichols, Miff Mole, and Eddie Lang. His voice recorded well - both acoustically and electrically - and was one of the most prolific singers during the 1920s.

Kaufman retired after a heart attack in 1949, and made no further commercial recordings until 1974, when a 2-LP set titled Reminisce With Irving Kaufman was released. It consisted mostly of transcriptions of his old recordings, but included several new cuts of Kaufman singing, accompanied by his second wife, Belle Brooks (1904–93). After his retirement, he lived in Palm Springs, California. He died January 3, 1976, in Indio, California.
