= Charles Braverman =

American filmmaker, collage animator, and producer

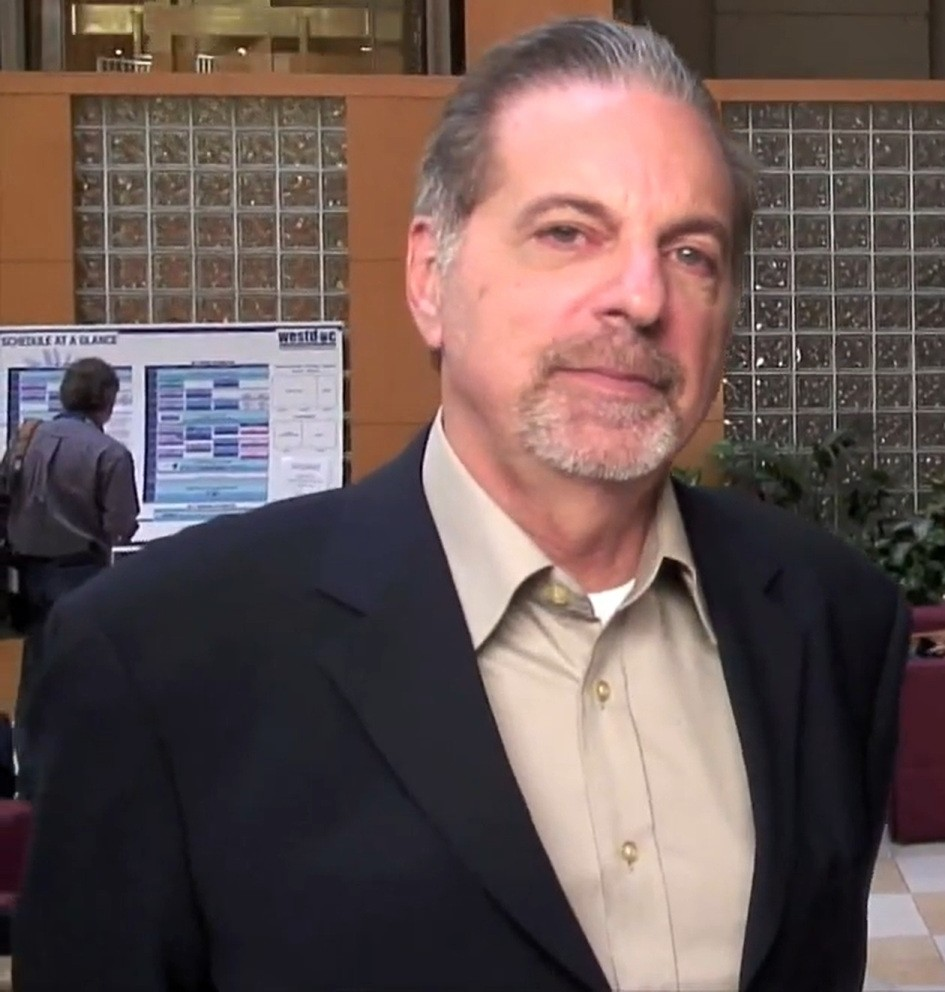
- Braverman in 2009
- Born: Charles Dell Braverman; March 3, 1944 (age 82); Los Angeles, California, U.S.
- Occupations: Director, producer, filmmaker

Charles Dell "Chuck" Braverman (born March 3, 1944, in Los Angeles, California) is an American film director, collage animator, documentary filmmaker and producer. He was nominated for an Academy Award for Documentary Short Subject for his 2000 documentary, Curtain Call; he was also nominated for three Directors Guild of America Awards for Outstanding Directorial Achievement in Documentary (2000, 2001, 2002), winning in 2000 for High School Boot Camp. He has also directed episodes of several major television series, including Beverly Hills, 90210, Melrose Place and Northern Exposure as well as television films such as the Prince of Bel Air and Brotherhood of Justice starring Keanu Reeves and Kiefer Sutherland.

== Biography ==
=== Personal life ===
Braverman is the son of television producer, Herb Braverman (died 1958), and actress Kendall Carly Browne. His brother is actor Bart Braverman.

Braverman graduated from the University of Southern California in 1967.

=== Career ===
Among his earliest efforts was an animated short film called An American Time Capsule set to a recording of "The Charge" from the album Beat That #?!* Drum by famous drummer Sandy Nelson (the film credits only cite the album name, not the actual title of the song). The film was composed of hundreds of short clips of art and photos (graphics animation) depicting 200 years of American history in two and a half minutes. This film was originally seen on The Smothers Brothers Comedy Hour on the CBS network in 1968. The Smothers Brothers commissioned a second film from Braverman about the year 1968 for their final 1969 season. (Both films were included on the Smothers Brother Comedy Hour DVDs, and An American Time Capsule can be viewed on the Internet Archive.)

In 1971–72, Braverman made a 12-minute film about the history of the Beatles called "Braverman's Condensed Cream of the Beatles", first seen on Geraldo Rivera's "Good Night America" television show for ABC. The film used mostly animated graphics, but also features some short live action clips, including a cameo by Rivera interviewing John Lennon about his American citizenship troubles. The film was distributed in 16mm by Pyramid Films in the 1970s, but so far has never been officially released on video.

Braverman produced the opening sequence to the 1973 film Soylent Green in the same style of American Time Capsule.

In the 1980s, he produced D-TV for The Disney Channel.

== Filmography ==
- American Time Capsule (1968)
- World of 68 (1969)
- Television Land (1971)
- Braverman's Condensed Cream of the Beatles (1974)
- Trader Vic's Used Cars (1975)
- Nixon: Checkers to Watergate (1976)
- Peanuts to the Presidency (1977)
- Final Shot: The Hank Gathers Story (1992)
- High School Boot Camp (2000)
- Curtain Call (2000)
- Rocky and Rolanda (2001)
- Bottom of the Ninth (2002)
