= Maida Craigen =

American actress

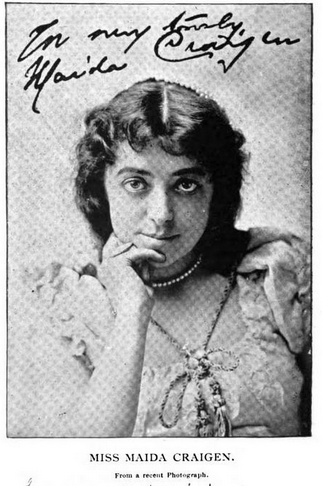
Maida Craigen, from an 1894 publication.

Maida Craigen (1861 — April 5, 1942) was an American actress and clubwoman.

== Early life ==
Maida Craigen was educated in Boston, Massachusetts. Her mother was a "once noted literary woman".

== Career ==
=== Stage ===
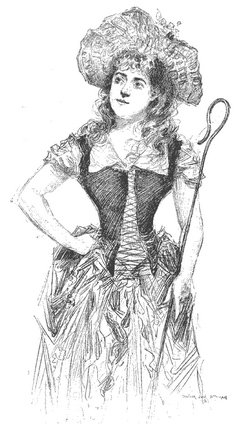
Maida Craigen as Phebe in As You Like It, from an 1891 publication.

Craigen first appeared on stage in 1885 in Hugh Conway's production of Called Back at the Park Theatre in Boston with Kate Claxton leading the cast. In 1886 she appeared at the Boston Museum, in Dion Boucicault's The Jilt, and in the first production of A. C. Gunter's Prince Karl, which starred Richard Mansfield. In 1888 she made her Broadway debut at the Fifth Avenue Theatre as Donna Leonora in Ross Neal's Loyal Love.

In 1889 Craigen starred in two plays by William Shakespeare at the Broadway Theatre in New York with Edwin Booth and Helena Modjeska; playing Jessica in The Merchant of Venice with Booth as Shylock and Modjeska as Portia, and playing Hero in Much Ado About Nothing with Booth as Benedick and Modjeska as Beatrice. That same year she starred in Brander Matthews's The Silent System with Benoît-Constant Coquelin. In 1891 she appeared in As You Like It in New York, alongside Viola Allen, Maurice Barrymore, and Rose Coghlan, among others.

Willa Cather appreciated Craigen's interpretation of the role of Juliet in 1894, saying "no fault can be found, it is great in that it is like no other actress." Her Juliet was opposite Frederick Paulding as Romeo; she also appeared with Paulding in 1895 in Maine and Georgia, a Civil War drama. She and Paulding were the stars together of the touring repertory troupe, the Maida Craigen Company. In 1899 she starred in Paul Kester's adaptation of Charles Rice's 1873 play The Three Musketeers which was mounted by the Professional Women's League at the Broadway Theatre in New York City. She also starred in Mlle. de Brisson with Cora Urquhart Brown-Potter.

=== Club work and other activities ===
In 1891 Craigen was among the organizers of the Twelfth Night Club, a private club for actresses in New York. She served on the women's committee of the Actors' Fund Fair in 1892. In 1899 she was vice-president of the Actors' Society of America, and served on the organization's board of directors. She was elected president of the Professional Women's League in 1913, having earlier served as treasurer of that organization under Amelia Bingham and Ida C. Nahm. In 1916, Craigen was head of the drama department of the New York State Federation of Women's Clubs.

A poem by Craigen, "Mystery", appeared in the magazine The Opera Glass in 1894. She was known to enjoy bicycling, saying "Bicycle teachers all say that actors and actresses are the easiest to teach. Is it that our habit of mental flexibility makes us more pliable and poised physically?"

== Personal life ==
Maida Craigen married actor Arthur Falkland Buchanan in 1888, in London. They divorced in 1893. She spent her last years at the Lillian Booth Actors Home, and died at a hospital in Englewood, New Jersey in April 1942, aged 81 years.
