= My Official Wife (1926 film) =

1926 film

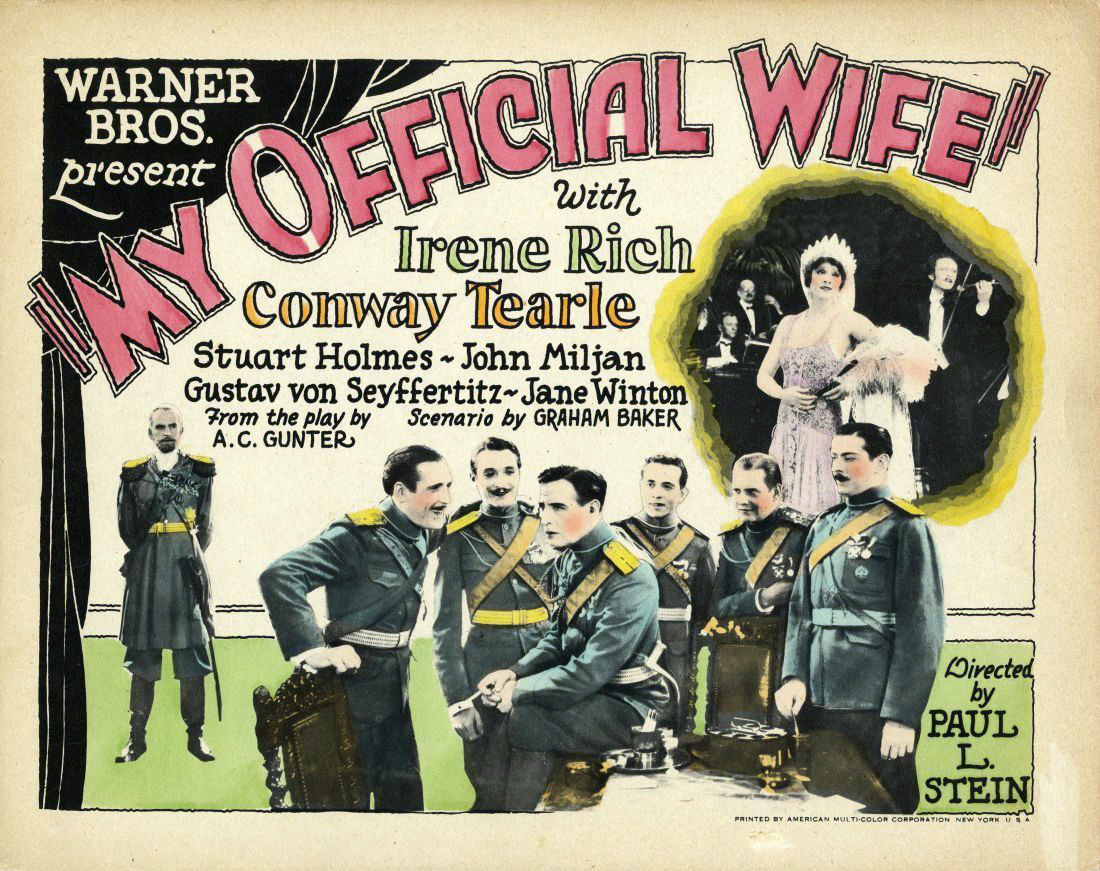
- Lobby card
- Directed by: Paul L. Stein
- Written by: Archibald Clavering Gunter; Graham Baker
- Starring: Irene Rich; Conway Tearle
- Cinematography: David Abel
- Production company: The Vitaphone Corp.
- Distributed by: Warner Bros. Pictures, Inc. (as Warner Brothers Production)
- Release date: October 16, 1926
- Running time: 74 min. (7,846 feet)
- Country: United States
- Language: Silent (English intertitles)
- Budget: $148,000
- Box office: $315,000

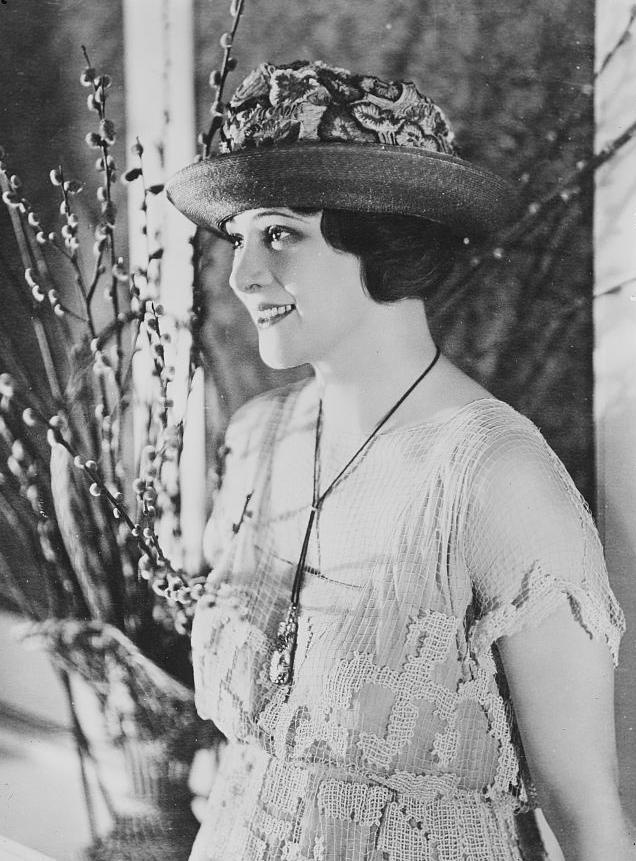
Irene Rich, lead actress

My Official Wife is a 1926 American silent romantic drama film by Austrian director Paul L. Stein, and his first American film. It stars Irene Rich and Conway Tearle. It is an adaptation of the 1891 novel My Official Wife by Richard Henry Savage (which had been filmed once before in 1914 by the Vitagraph Company of America with Clara Kimball Young as the lead), but the storyline was updated to include World War I.

== Cast ==
- Irene Rich as Hélène, Countess Orloff
- Conway Tearle as Alexander, aka Sascha
- Jane Winton as Demimondaine
- Gustav von Seyffertitz as Grand Duke
- Stuart Holmes as Ivan
- John Miljan as Nicholas
- Émile Chautard as Count Orloff, Hélène's Father
- Sidney Bracey as Valet to Sascha
- Michael Vavitch as Commandant
- Tom Ford
- Russell Ritchie
- Tom Costello
- Igor Presnikoff
- Florence Wagner

== Reception ==
Reviews were extremely mixed. Film Daily compiled newspaper review quotes upon the film's release (as it did for many releases), citing the New York American as stating it was "repulsive ... players are badly miscast." The Daily News called it "worth going to see ... well acted, well directed and nicely dressed up bit of screen hokum." The Evening World called it a "matinee picture for unhurried chocolate munchers ... too long and too slow moving," and the Morning Telegraph dubbed it "first rate entertainment ... our interest never for one moment lagged."

According to Warner Bros records the film earned $219,000 domestically and $96,000 foreign.

== Preservation ==
With no prints of My Official Wife located in any film archives, if is a lost film.

== See also ==
- My Official Wife (1914 film)
- Escapade (1936 film)

== Bibliography ==
- Kobal, John, ed. (1976). Hollywood Glamor Portraits: 145 Photos of Stars, 1926–1949. New York: Courier Corporation. ISBN 978-0-486-23352-9.
