= Mr. Potter of Texas =

Mr. Potter of Texas may refer to:

- Mr. Potter of Texas (novel), an 1888 novel by Archibald Clavering Gunter
- Mr. Potter of Texas (film), a 1922 silent film adaptation directed by Leopold Wharton
