= My Official Wife =

Book by Richard Henry Savage

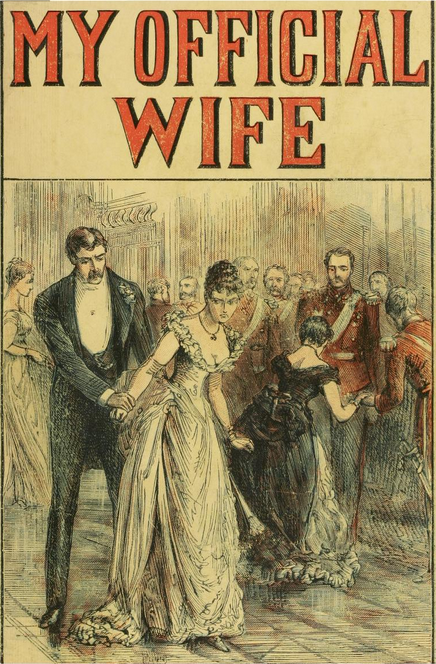
- Cover for 1892 English edition
- Author: Richard Henry Savage
- Language: English
- Publisher: Home Publishing (United States); Routledge (United Kingdom)
- Publication date: May 1891
- Publication place: United States
- Media type: Print (hardcover) (231 p.)

My Official Wife is an 1891 novel by Richard Henry Savage, popular in its day, soon after adapted for the stage, and for silent films in 1914 and in 1926, and a German-language film in 1936.

== Book ==
Savage wrote the first draft of his first novel in 1890, while recovering in New York after being struck by illness in Honduras. Encouraged by friends who lauded his five-chapter tale of adventure set in contemporary Russia, Savage was inspired to rewrite and expand the story into a novel. First published by Archibald Clavering Gunter's Home Publishing Company in May 1891, it was a quick best-seller, and was translated into multiple languages, but not Russian, as it was reportedly banned in Russia. Though not every review was so glowing, The Times in London notably called it "a wonderful and clever tour de force, in which improbabilities and impossibilities disappear, under an air that is irresistible." Buoyed by the novel's success, Savage began producing more books at a rapid rate, about three a year.

In 1913, the Bookman noted that while few Americans may know Pushkin, Chehkov, or Korolenko, "very many Americans have, at some time in their lives, dipped into the pages of Colonel Savage's perfectly trivial story."

An 1896 synopsis of the novel:

This clever skit is permeated by a Russian atmosphere, in which visions of the secret police, the Nihilists, and social life in St. Petersburg, are blended like the vague fancies of a trouble dream.

Colonel Arthur Lenox, with passports made out for himself and wife, meets at the Russian frontier a strikingly beautiful woman whom he is induced to pass over the border as his own wife, who has remained in Paris.

At St. Petersburg, Helene, the "official wife", receives mail addressed to Mrs. Lenox, shares the Colonel's apartments, and is introduced everywhere as his wife. But he has learned that she is a prominent and dangerous Nihilist, and is in daily fear of discovery and punishment.

Lenox frustrates her design to assassinate the Emperor; after which Helene escapes by the aid of a Russian officer whom she has beguiled. Meantime the real wife has come on from Paris, and endless complications with the police ensue. The Colonel secures his wife's release by threatening the chief of police that otherwise he inform the Tsar of the inefficiency of the police department, in not unearthing the scheme for his assassination.

Many claims were made regarding the basis for the novel's heroine, all of which Savage denied. For example, some papers reported that a Sophie Gunsberg, executed in 1891 in Russia, was the inspiration.

== Play ==
My Official Wife
- Original language: English
- Written by: Archibald Clavering Gunter, from Savage novel

Premiere
- Date: 23 January 1893 (Broadway)
- Place: Standard Theatre

The novel was adapted for the stage by Gunter, and under the management of Frank W. Sanger, first performed in Utica, New York on November 7, 1892. After out of town warm-ups, its Broadway debut occurred at the Standard Theatre on January 23, 1893. Minnie Seligman starred as Helene, and her wealthy husband but novice actor Robert L. Cutting, Jr. also played a role. While the overflow crowd at the debut "enjoyed themselves immensely," it was not well-regarded by the critics. Cutting's very poor acting was especially noted. The play ran on Broadway for about three weeks.

In 1896, The New York Times commented that the play "was a pretty bad play, very badly acted except as regards the title role," yet that did not stop Die Officielle Frau, based on the German translation from Hans Olden, from appearing at the Irving Place Theatre. The German play was censored in Vienna, which drew more attention to it when performed in Munich at the Staatstheater am Gärtnerplatz.

The authors of the 1895 English play The Passport, B. C. Stephenson and William Yardley, also gave credit to the novel for inspiration.

== 1914 film ==
Vitagraph Studios issued a 1914 silent film version of the story directed by James Young and starring Clara Kimball Young, Harry T. Morey, and Rose E. Tapley.

== Out of the Depths (1919 film) ==
A German film directed by Georg Jacoby, and starring Ellen Richter.

== 1926 film ==
My Official Wife was again filmed in 1926, directed by Paul L. Stein (his first American film), and starring Irene Rich and Conway Tearle.

== Eskapade (1936 film) ==
The German language film Eskapade (alternate titles: Seine Offizielle Frau and Gehemagentin Helene) based on the novel was released in 1936, starring Renate Müller, Georg Alexander, and Walter Franck. It was directed by Erich Waschneck.
