= Grosvenor Light Opera Company =

Grosvenor Light Opera Company (GLOC) is a nonprofit community theatre group in London, England, established in 1949 to study and perform the works of Gilbert and Sullivan. The company has been described by Ian Bradley as the "leading amateur G & S performing group in London".

== Stage productions ==
The group performs the Savoy operas in central London, and in 1964 it produced a musicalised version of W. S. Gilbert's play Engaged. It has performed some of its productions at the International Gilbert and Sullivan Festival and has toured a production of Cox and Box.

== Television ==
In 1998 members of the group appeared as the Gilbert and Sullivan Choir in an episode of Kavanagh Q.C.

== Critical reception ==
In a review in 2015, BroadwayWorld said a Grosvenor Light Opera Company production of Ruddigore was "splendid", commending its orchestra and its "mix of very experienced singers and students" who "carried off the gig with much aplomb".

== Notable people ==
- Dennis Knight, répétiteur at the Royal Opera House, was a director of the Grosvenor Light Opera Company.
- Sarah Olney, former MP for Richmond Park, was the company's chairman at age 26.
