= Julia Stewart (actress) =

English actress (1862 – 1945)

Julia Stewart as Maggie in Engaged, 1877

Julia Stewart (20 June 1862 – 12 December 1945) was an English actress. Beginning her career as a child actress, she went on to success on the London stage in adult roles in the late 1870s. She appeared on stage in New York from 1879.

== Biography ==
Stewart was born in Clerkenwell, London. Her father was a well-known Scottish comedian, David ("auld Davie") Stewart. She began performing as a child actress at the Theatre Royal, Glasgow, in 1867, first speaking the following year in the juvenile role of Sybil in A Wolf in Sheep's Clothing. She performed until 1876 at the Theatre Royal, Glasgow, and in Newcastle upon Tyne, in both girls' and boys' roles. In 1876, she became a member of Sarah Thorne's theatre company, playing the adult part of Emma Marigold in My Awful Dad, opposite Charles Mathews.

In 1877, at the age of 15, she made her London début, creating the role of Maggie Macfarlane in W. S. Gilbert's comedy, Engaged, at the Haymarket Theatre with much success. She also played the part in a provincial tour and again in the play's revival at the Strand Theatre in 1878. The Era reported: "A decidedly favourable impression was made by Miss Julia Stewart, who ... bewitched all present by her pretty face, her artless, winning style, her dainty treatment of the Scotch dialect, and the thorough freshness and naturalness of her acting throughout. This was one of the pleasantest performances we have seen for many a day". She then returned to the Haymarket as Mary Meredith in a revival Our American Cousin with E. A. Sothern, taking the same part on tour after the London run. During the tour, she also played Ada Ingot in David Garrick, earning good reviews.

In 1879, Sothern took the 17-year-old Stewart with him to America to appear at the Park Theatre in New York in Brother Sam. She soon joined the troupe of Tommaso Salvini for an American tour, playing in Shakespeare and other classic plays. She appeared in Two Nights in Rome by Archibald Clavering Gunter, at the Union Square Theatre in New York. Stewart continued to perform on stage in the US after this. In 1885, she was cast to play in a production of Paquita at Baldwin's Theatre in San Francisco, California. She appeared with Dion Boucicault's company in 1887 in Boston as Cuba in Finn MacCool of Skibbereen and in San Francisco in Drop Curtain Monographs. Years later, she played Gloria Quayle in The Christian in a tour of the western US.

On 14 September 1892, she married, and subsequently divorced, the actor Frank Wilford Curtis. In 1925, Stewart was living at the Hotel Broztell in New York City when she was a witness in a case concerning a man passing a fraudulent check.

She died in 1945, at the age of 82, in Darby, Pennsylvania.
