= Mr. Potter of Texas (novel) =

1888 novel

- First edition
- Author: Archibald Clavering Gunter
- Language: English
- Genre: Comedy
- Publisher: The Home Publishing Company
- Publication date: 1888
- Publication place: United States
- Media type: Print

Mr. Potter of Texas is an 1888 novel by the British-born American writer Archibald Clavering Gunter.

== Adaptation ==
In 1922 it was adapted into a silent film of the same title directed by Leopold Wharton and starring Macklyn Arbuckle and Corene Uzzell.

== Bibliography ==
- Goble, Alan. The Complete Index to Literary Sources in Film. Walter de Gruyter, 199
- Munden, Kenneth White. The American Film Institute Catalog of Motion Pictures Produced in the United States, Part 1. University of California Press, 1997.
