= The Thoroughbred (1925 film) =

1925 silent film

- Directed by: Oscar Apfel
- Written by: Leete Renick Brown
- Starring: Macklyn Arbuckle; Theodore von Eltz; Gladys Hulette
- Cinematography: Roland Price
- Production company: Phil Goldstone Productions
- Distributed by: Truart Film Corporation; Woolf & Freedman Film Service (UK)
- Release date: July 14, 1925
- Running time: 63 minutes
- Country: United States
- Languages: Silent; English intertitles

The Thoroughbred is a lost 1925 American silent comedy film directed by Oscar Apfel and starring Macklyn Arbuckle, Theodore von Eltz and Gladys Hulette.

== Cast ==
- Macklyn Arbuckle as Peter Bemis
- Theodore von Eltz as Robert Bemis
- Gladys Hulette as Mitzi Callahan
- Hallam Cooley as Dan Drummond
- Virginia Brown Faire as Gwen Vandermere
- Carter DeHaven as Archie de Rennsaler
- Thomas Jefferson
- Robert Brower
- Edith Murgatroyd
- Lillian Langdon

== Preservation ==
With no holdings located in archives, The Thoroughbred is considered a lost film.

== Bibliography ==
- Rainey, Buck. Sweethearts of the Sage: Biographies and Filmographies of 258 actresses appearing in Western movies. McFarland & Company, 1992.
