= Agnes Booth =

American actress (1843–1910)

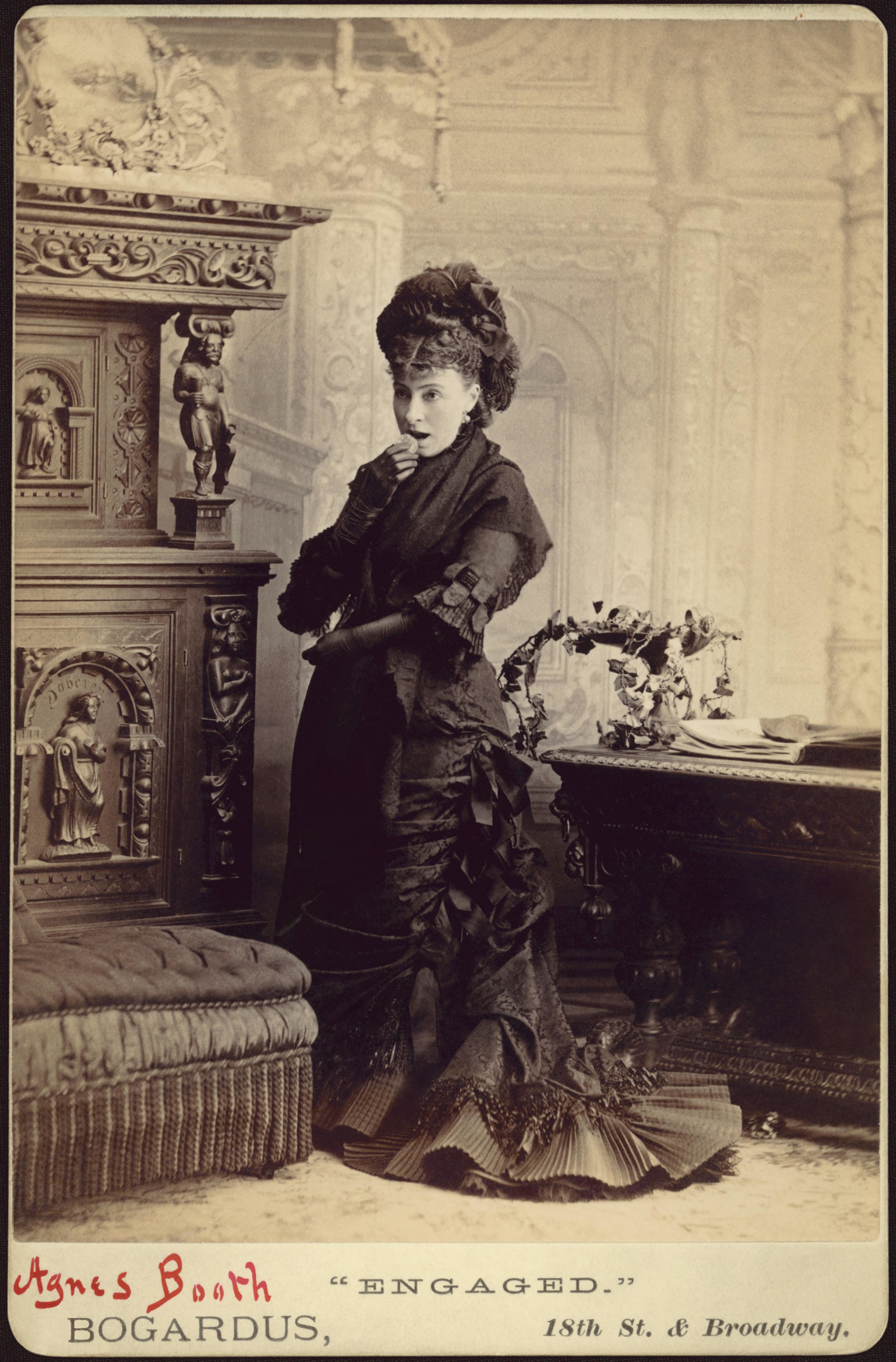
- In W. S. Gilbert's Engaged, 1879.
- Born: Marian Agnes Land Rookes; October 4, 1843; Sydney, New South Wales, Australia
- Died: January 2, 1910 (aged 66); Brookline, Massachusetts, US
- Occupation: Actress
- Years active: 1858–97
- Spouse(s): Harry A. Perry (m. 1861; died 1862) Junius Brutus Booth Jr. (m. 1867; died 1883) John B. Schoeffel (m. 1885)

Marian Agnes Land Booth (née Rookes; October 4, 1843 – January 2, 1910), was an Australian-born American actress and wife of actor Junius Brutus Booth Jr.

== Biography ==
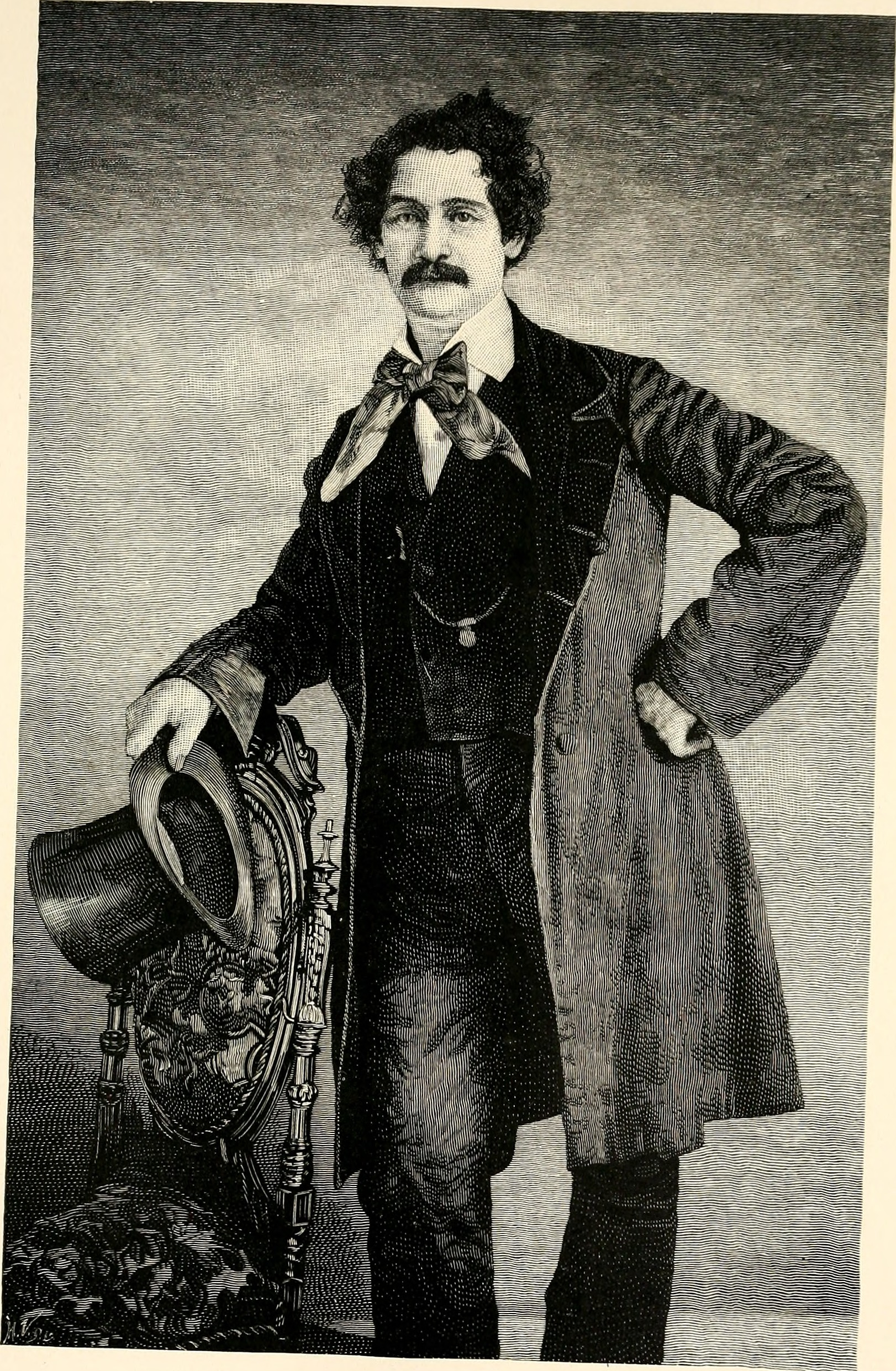
Harry A. Perry, first husband of Agnes Booth

Although there are no records of Agnes Booth's birth or her family's residence in Australia, by her own account, she was born in Sydney, New South Wales. She migrated to California with her family in 1858, at the age of about 14.

She made her US debut in early 1858 as Agnes Land, performing with her sister Belle at Maguire's Opera House, San Francisco, attracting attention and gaining recognition, and managing a season of the Metropolitan theatre in Detroit. In 1861, she married actor Harry A. Perry in San Francisco, but was widowed in 1862. Her six-year apprenticeship with Thomas Maguire allowed her to move from shape actress to leading lady.

In 1865, she moved to New York, where she appeared at the Winter Garden Theatre. As Agnes Perry in 1866, she joined the Boston Theatre Company, of which she was a member for several years. In 1867, she was married to Junius Brutus Booth Jr., and she performed as Agnes Booth thereafter.

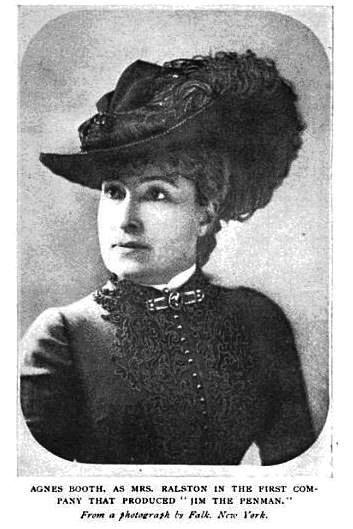
Agnes Booth in 1907

At the height of her popularity, reviews of her performances were effusive. In 1874, the News described her as "the most finished and effective emotional actress at present on the metropolitan stage." She played Belinda in the first American production of W. S. Gilbert's Engaged in 1879. In 1889, Belford's Magazine wrote of another "great triumph" by Agnes Booth in Captain Swift. "For painstaking attention to detail, nicety of intonation, and powerful expression, Agnes Booth is in the front rank of leading ladies. We have seen her in many society dramas, and in each she has shown a charming appreciation of all the requirements... The mingled expression of shame, suffering and maternal love in Agnes Booth's face during [one] scene is one not soon to be forgotten. In 1874, she and Junius made a praiseworthy trip to the far west playing San Francisco's California Theater and Piper's Opera House in Virginia City. Her repertoire included Romeo and Juliet, Hunchback, and Lady of Lyons.

In 1878, she played Madeleine Renaud in the Union Square Theatre's production of A Celebrated Case, the program noting that she had "kindly undertaken this part in order to strengthen the cast." From 1881 to 1891, she was with the Madison Square Company. After 1891, she went to Europe, then returned to the United States where she resided in the artist community of New Rochelle, New York and resumed her work on Broadway in nearby New York City. Booth gained fame for her role in the melodrama The Sporting Duchess (The Derby Winner by Cecil Raleigh) along with fellow actress and New Rochelle neighbor Cora Tanner.

Junius Booth died in 1883, and in 1885 she married John B. Schoeffel, manager of Boston's Tremont theatre. Her last major performance was in L'Arlesienne in 1897.

She died at her home in Brookline, Massachusetts on January 2, 1910.

== Sources ==
- Asia Booth Clarke (1882). The Elder and the Younger Booth, Boston: J.R. Osgood and Co.
- McKay and Wingate (1896). Famous American Actors of To-day, New York: T.Y. Crowell.
- Clapp and Edgett (1899). "Players of the Present", Dunlap Society Publication. New York.
- Montrose Jonas Moses (1906). Famous Actor-Families in America, New York: Greenwood Press.
