= Escapade (1936 film) =

1936 film

- Directed by: Erich Waschneck
- Written by: Hans Bussmann; Carl Echtermeier; Rolf Meyer; Thea von Harbou
- Based on: My Official Wife by Richard Henry Savage
- Produced by: Hermann Grund; Erich Waschneck
- Starring: Renate Müller; Georg Alexander; Grethe Weiser
- Cinematography: Friedl Behn-Grund
- Edited by: Munni Obal
- Music by: Kurt Schröder
- Production company: Fanal-Filmproduktion
- Distributed by: Rota-Film
- Release date: 1 September 1936
- Running time: 98 minutes
- Country: Germany
- Language: German

Escapade (German: Eskapade) is a 1936 German romantic comedy film directed by Erich Waschneck and starring Renate Müller, Georg Alexander and Grethe Weiser. It was shot at the Halensee Studios in Berlin. The film's sets were designed by the art directors Otto Erdmann and Hans Sohnle. It is based on the 1891 novel My Official Wife by Richard Henry Savage.

== Cast ==
- Renate Müller as Madame Hélène
- Georg Alexander as Arthur Lenox
- Grethe Weiser as Hélène Lenox
- Walter Franck as Rakowsky - Chef der russ. Geheimpolizei
- Martha von Konssatzki as Fürstin Palitzin
- Franz Zimmermann as Sascha - ihr Neffe
- Paula Denk as Vera - seine Braut
- Paul Otto as Großfürst Ignatieff
- Harald Paulsen as Ossip Kaschejeff
- Reinhold Bernt as Prowiak, ein Friseur
- Harry Hardt as Woidetzki - Chef des Modesalons Brétonne
- Ernst Rotmund as von Podamsky
- Heinz Wemper as Suboff, Argent der Geheimpolizei
- Margarete Kupfer as Eine alte Dame
- Rudolf Biebrach
- Angelo Ferrari
- Erich Fiedler
- Bernhard Goetzke
- Jochen Hauer
- Agnes Kraus as Manja
- Otto Kronburger
- Herbert Spalke
- Arnim Suessenguth
- Bruno Ziener
- Sabine Ress as Ballett
- Alexander von Swaine as Solotänzer
- Alice Uhlen as Solotänzerin
- Ernst Rater

== Bibliography ==
- Bock, Hans-Michael; Bergfelder, Tim, eds. (2009). The Concise Cinegraph: Encyclopaedia of German Cinema. New York: Berghahn Books. ISBN 978-1-57181-655-9.
