= The Lure of the Track =

- Directed by: J. P. McGowan
- Produced by: Charles Makranzy
- Starring: Sheldon Lewis; Macklyn Arbuckle; Dot Farley
- Production company: Charles Makranzy Productions
- Distributed by: Lee-Bradford Corporation
- Release date: December 1925
- Running time: 50 minutes
- Country: United States
- Languages: Silent; English intertitles

The Lure of the Track is a 1925 American silent drama film directed by J. P. McGowan and starring Sheldon Lewis, Macklyn Arbuckle, and Dot Farley.

== Cast ==
- Sheldon Lewis
- Macklyn Arbuckle
- Dot Farley
- June Norton
- Tempe Pigott
- Danny Hoy

== Bibliography ==
- McGowan, John J. J.P. McGowan: Biography of a Hollywood Pioneer. McFarland, 2005.
- Nash, Jay Robert. The Motion Picture Guide 1988 Annual. Cinebooks, 1997.
