= Lucy Isabella Buckstone =

English actress (1857–1893)

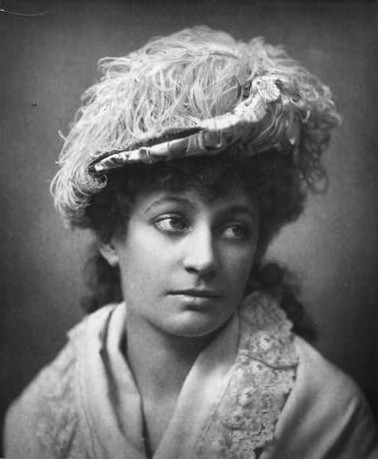
Lucy Isabella Buckstone

Lucy Isabella Buckstone (September 1857 – 17 March 1893) was an English actress born to a noted British stage family. She was perhaps best remembered for her portrayals of Annette in the Leopold David Lewis drama The Bells, and Lucy Ormond in Peril by Scott and Stephenson.

She began her stage career about 1875 and continued acting into the early 1890s.

== Life and career ==
Buckstone was born in Lewisham to the actor-manager John Baldwin Buckstone and his wife, Isabella Copeland Buckstone. Her 11 siblings included brothers John Copeland Buckstone and Rowland (born 1860). All three siblings would eventually follow their father into acting careers.

Buckstone made her first appearance on stage at the Croydon Theatre as Gertrude in Augustus Harris's The Little Treasure. She first appeared at the Haymarket Theatre on 26 December 1875 as Ada Ingot in David Garrick, and later played Florence Trenchard in Our American Cousin and Lucy Dorrison in Home, from the French L’Adventuriér by Emile Augier. In 1876 at the Lyceum Theatre, she played Annette in The Bells by Leopold David Lewis, adapted from the French, and Lady Frances Touchwood in The Belle's Stratagem. In June 1876 she appeared at the Drury Lane Theatre as Maria in a testimonial performance of School for Scandal held in behalf of her father. That same year at the Prince of Wales's Theatre she was Lucy Ormond in Peril by Scott and Stephenson, an adaptation of Sardou's Nos intimes. The following year Buckstone appeared as Minnie in Engaged, a comedy by W. S. Gilbert at the Haymarket.

On 6 January 1879, at St. James's Church, Piccadilly, Buckstone was married to Henry Edwards Smithes, the son of a wealthy London wine merchant. Her husband owned a large tract of cattle land near Victoria, Kansas, and for a time she joined him there, though eventually she returned to England after tiring of life on the prairie.

In December 1882 Buckstone joined Genevieve Ward at the Olympic Theatre playing Alice in the Merivale and Grove drama, Forget-Me-Not, and the following year she played Abigail Hill in The Queen’s Favorite by Sydney Grundy, followed by Gladys Grant in Rachel, Lucy Bertram in Guy Mannering and Bertha de Mottrville in A Great Catch. In 1884 Buckstone played Edith Marsland at the Prince Theatre in Charles Hawtrey's The Private Secretary, and the following year, she was Blanche Denham in The Denhams, adapted from The Crisis by Thomas Holcroft. In February 1891 at the Globe Theatre she was Gwendolen Pettigrew in the George William Godfrey comedy The Parvenu, and that July at the Criterion Theatre, she was Flora in Miss Decima, by F. C. Burnand, from the French.

Buckstone died in London on 17 March 1893 at the age of 35.
