= It's No Laughing Matter =

1915 film by Lois Weber

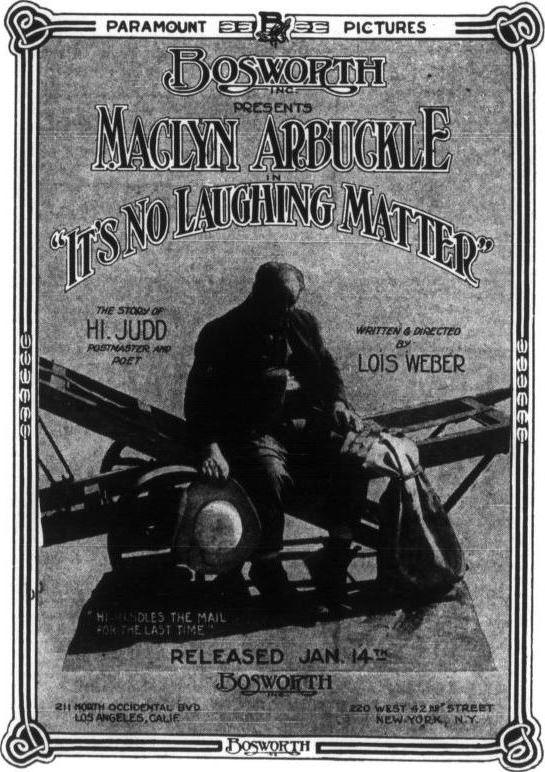
- Advertisement
- Directed by: Lois Weber
- Written by: Lois Weber
- Produced by: Phillips Smalley; Lois Weber
- Starring: Macklyn Arbuckle; Cora Drew; Myrtle Stedman; Charles Marriott; Adele Farrington; Frank Elliott
- Cinematography: Dal Clawson
- Production company: Hobart Bosworth Productions
- Distributed by: Paramount Pictures
- Release date: January 14, 1915
- Running time: 4-5 reels
- Country: United States
- Language: Silent (English intertitles)

It's No Laughing Matter is an extant 1915 American comedy silent film written and directed by Lois Weber. The film stars Macklyn Arbuckle, Cora Drew, Myrtle Stedman, Charles Marriott, Adele Farrington, and Frank Elliott. The film was released on January 14, 1915, by Paramount Pictures.

== Cast ==
- Macklyn Arbuckle as Hi Judd
- Cora Drew as Mrs. Judd
- Myrtle Stedman as Bess Judd
- Charles Marriott as Jim Skinner
- Adele Farrington as Widow Wilkins
- Frank Elliott as Sam

== Preservation status ==
Only a portion of It's No Laughing Matter exists in the Library of Congress. Both the Library of Congress database website and the Catalog of Holdings 1978 book indicate incomplete or fragmentary status.

== See also ==
- List of Paramount Pictures films
