= On Trial (1917 film) =

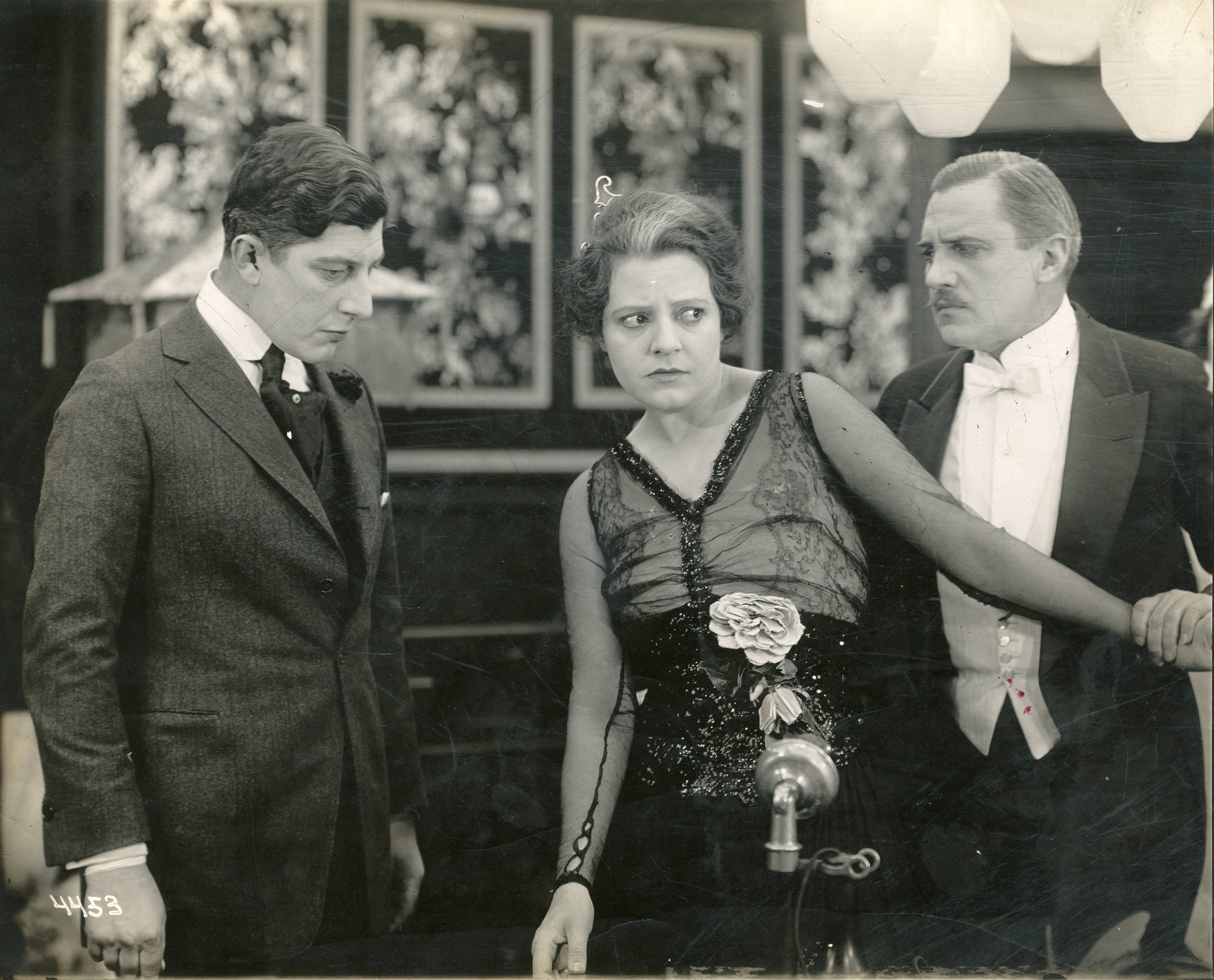
- Still with Patrick Calhoun, Corene Uzzell, and James Young
- Directed by: James Young (assistant:W. S. Van Dyke)
- Written by: James Young
- Based on: On Trial by Elmer Rice
- Starring: Barbara Castleton
- Production company: Essanay Film Manufacturing Company
- Distributed by: First National Exhibitors
- Release date: June 23, 1917
- Running time: 1 hr. 10 mins.
- Country: United States
- Language: Silent (English intertitles)

On Trial is a 1917 American silent drama film directed by James Young and starring Barbara Castleton. It was based on the play of the same name by Elmer Rice, produced by Essanay Film Manufacturing Company and distributed through First National Exhibitors (later First National Pictures) as its first feature film.

== Cast ==
- Barbara Castleton as Mrs. Robert Strickland
- Sidney Ainsworth as Robert Strickland
- Mary McAllister as Doris Strickland
- James Young as Gerald Trask
- Corene Uzzell as Mrs. Gerald Trask
- Patrick Calhoun as Glover
- John Cossar
- Richard Foster Baker as The Judge
- Harry Dunkinson as Attorney for the Defense
- Marian Skinner as Strickland Family Housekeeper
- Robert Bolder as Mr. Burke
- Thomas Commerford as Hotel Owner
- Frank Hamilton as Court Clerk
- Doris Kenyon (uncredited)

== Preservation status ==
A 35 mm print of On Trial is preserved in the George Eastman House Motion Picture Collection.
