= Two Nights in Rome =

1880 play

Two Nights in Rome is an 1880 American play by Archibald Clavering Gunter.

Directed to and consumed by the popular masses like all of Gunter's output, it has been described by modern critics as a success, and a "crude but powerful drama."

The play opened at Union Square Theatre in New York on August 16, 1880. The New York Times noted that the plot was complicated and could not be easily summarized, and "while the entertainment cannot be said to be up to the standard of the Union-Square performances during the regular season, it furnishes an average Summer evening's amusement." The summer offering closed on Saturday, September 11, 1880. It subsequently toured, and productions can be found being mounted into the 1910s.

Some asserted that the play seemed to borrow from Forget Me Not by Herman Charles Merivale and Florence Crauford Grove, though assertions of plagiarism were not uncommon in that age, The Critic (New York) noting in 1882 that "there is not one scene in 'Forget-me-not' which cannot be found in older writers."

== Original Broadway cast ==
- Joseph Wheelock as Gerald Massen
- Frank Mourdant at Abija Peabody
- Henry Edwards as Herr Franz
- J.R. Grismer as Capt. Warmstree
- J.B. Studley as Louis Bennidetti
- Geo. Devere as Gen. Aubrey
- J.W. Thorpe as George Seeley
- Harry B. Bell as Ferdie Fortescue
- M.B. Curtis as Walter
- John Morgan as Beppo
- Maude Granger as Antonia
- Julia Stewart as Evelyn Aubrey
- Katie Gilbert as Lily Davenant
- Adelaide Thornton as Mme. Sylvia
- Genevieve Mills as Tema
