= Determination (film) =

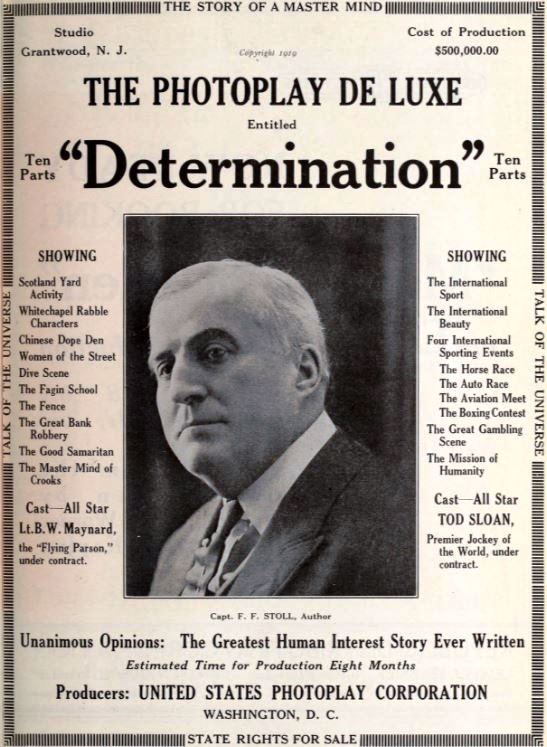
- Directed by: Joseph Levering
- Written by: Captain Stoll; Garfield Thompson
- Produced by: James W. Martin
- Starring: Maurice Costello
- Cinematography: William Crolly
- Production company: United States Moving Picture Corporation
- Distributed by: Lee-Bradford Corporation
- Release date: January 1922
- Running time: 100 minutes
- Country: United States
- Languages: Silent; English intertitles

Determination is a 1922 American silent drama film directed by Joseph Levering and starring Maurice Costello.

== Cast ==
- Alpheus Lincoln as John Morton Jr. / James Melvale
- Corene Uzzell as Madge Daley
- Irene Tams as Lucky
- Maurice Costello as Putnam
- Walter Ringham as Lord Warburton
- Gene Burnell as Frances Lloyd
- Mabel Allen as Lady Dalton
- Byron Russell as Lord Dalton
- Nina Herbert as Whitechapel Mary
- Charles Ascot as Dopefiend
- Hayden Stevenson as Sport Smiler
- Bernard Randall
- Louis Wolheim

== Preservation ==
With no prints of Determination located in any film archives, it is considered a lost film.

== Bibliography ==
- Langman, Larry. American Film Cycles: The Silent Era. Greenwood Publishing, 1998.
