= Engaged (play) =

Comic play by W. S. Gilbert

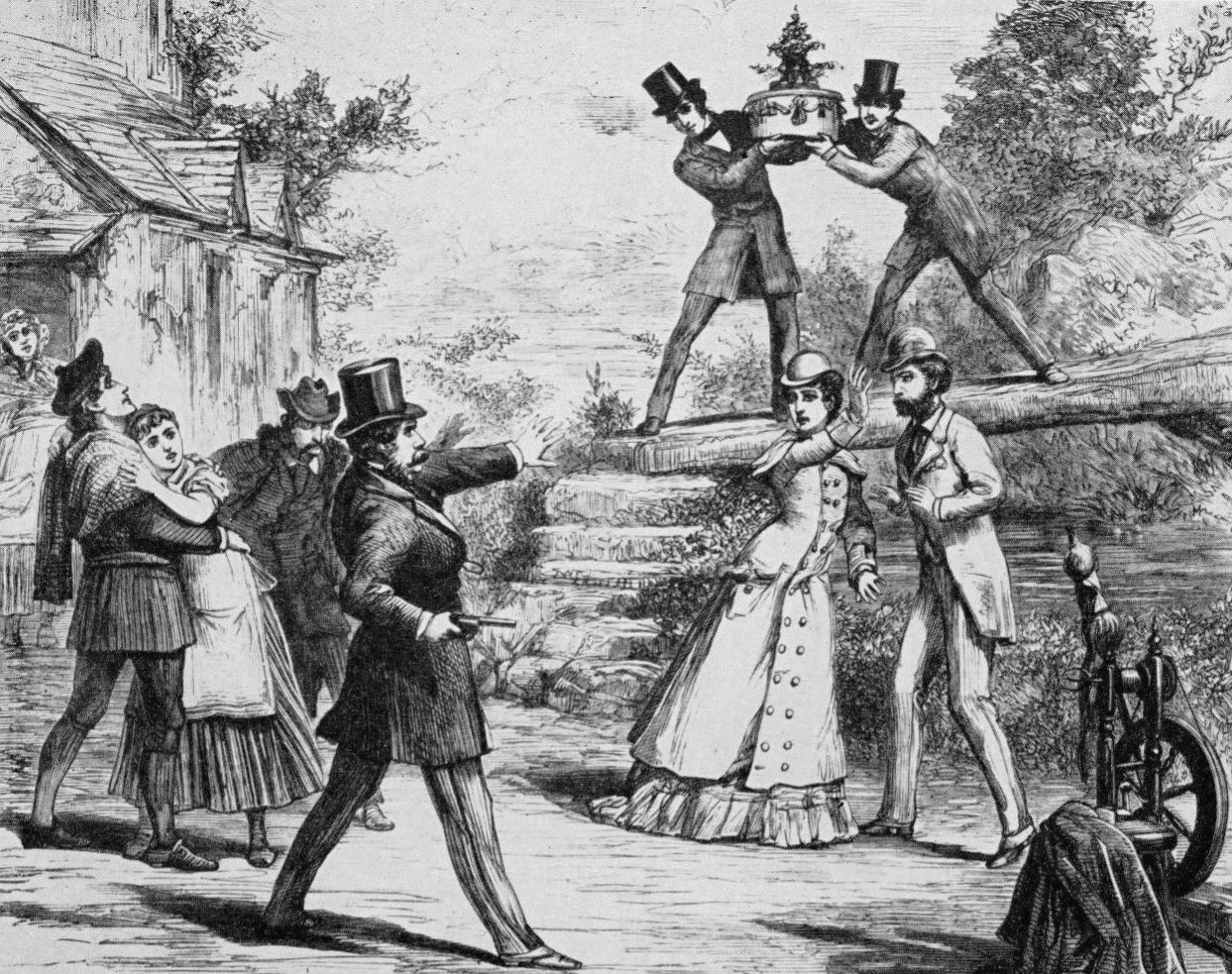
Climax of Act 1

Engaged is a three-act farcical comic play by W. S. Gilbert. The plot revolves around a rich young man, his search for a wife, and the attempts – from mercenary motives – by his uncle to encourage his marriage and by his best friend to prevent it. After frantic complications and changes of allegiance, all the main characters end up paired off, more or less to their satisfaction.

The play opened at the Haymarket Theatre in London on 3 October 1877, the year before Gilbert's first great success with the composer Arthur Sullivan in their comic opera H.M.S. Pinafore. Engaged was well received on the London stage and then in the British provinces, the US, Australia and New Zealand. It was subsequently revived many times and has continued to be produced during the 20th and 21st centuries.

The play has been called "unquestionably the finest and funniest English comedy between Bulwer-Lytton's Money [1840] and Wilde's The Importance of Being Earnest [1895] which it directly inspired", although some critics found it heartless. Other plays considered by critics to be influenced by Engaged are Bernard Shaw's Arms and the Man and Man and Superman. Later playwrights whose works have been seen as drawing on Engaged are Noël Coward and Joe Orton.

== Background ==
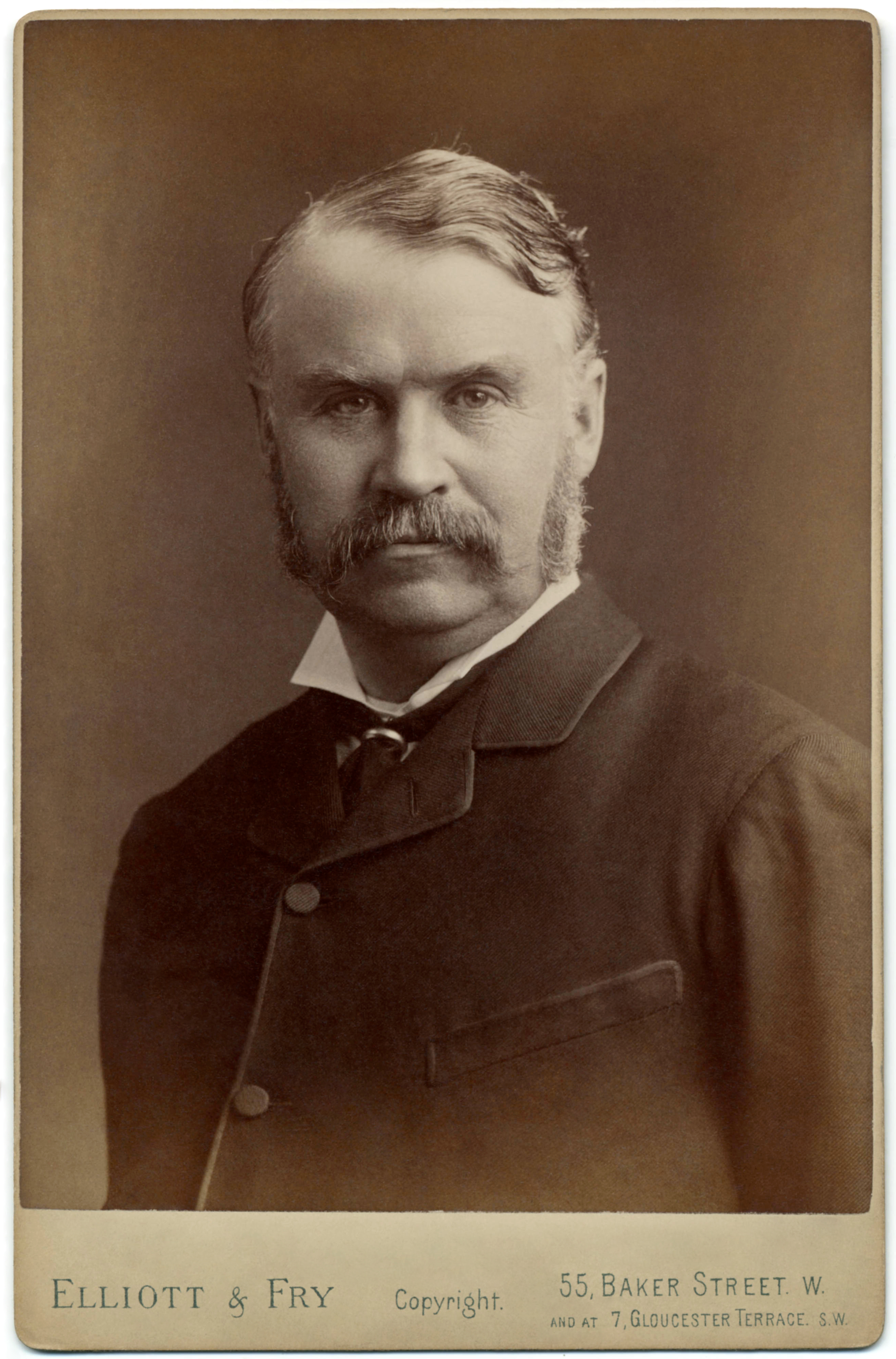
Cabinet card of W.S. Gilbert in about 1880 by Elliott & Fry

By 1877, Gilbert, now forty years old, was established as a dramatist. After his early burlesques of the 1860s he had turned to writing comic opera libretti and non-musical plays, both comic and serious. His musical successes included Ages Ago (music by Frederic Clay, 1869) and Trial by Jury (music by Arthur Sullivan (1875). (Note: By the time Engaged opened, Gilbert's third collaboration with Sullivan, The Sorcerer, was nearly complete; it opened the following month. The next year Gilbert and his collaborator had their first joint international success with H.M.S. Pinafore.) His serious and comic non-musical plays included Pygmalion and Galatea (1871), The Wicked World (1873), Sweethearts (1874) and several others that played for well over 100 performances – good runs by the standards of the time.

Engaged is written in the "topsy-turvy" satiric style of many of Gilbert's earlier Bab Ballads and his later Savoy Operas. A New York Times reviewer called it "human nature ... reversed – giving language to one series of emotions and acting another." Gilbert's previous play had been the drama Dan'l Druce (1876), in which he had sought to portray serious human emotions. It was a moderate success, but for Engaged he returned to his usual absurdist approach, inventing a cast of characters whose motivation is not love but money. Possibly to underline the contrast, in the new play he cast in the mercenary female lead role Marion Terry, who in Dan'l Druce had played a sentimental part. He also wrote a scene for the new play that appeared to parody one in its predecessor. A passage from Engaged, a speech by the central character, Cheviot Hill, reflects a Gilbertian notion of marriage:

Marriage is a very risky thing; it's like Chancery, once in it you can't get out of it, and the costs are enormous. There you are – fixed. Fifty years hence, if we're both alive, there we shall both be – fixed. That's the devil of it. It's an unreasonably long time to be responsible for another person's expenses. I don't see the use of making it for as long as that. It seems greedy to take up half a century of another person's attention. Besides – one never knows – one might come across somebody else one liked better – that uncommonly nice girl I met in Scotland, for instance. (Engaged, Act II)

Once he was in a position to do so, Gilbert directed productions of his own works. (Note: Except for a few early works, once Gilbert became an established dramatist in early 1870s, he was able to insist on directing his own works. This was an unusual practise in British theatre at the time, although it had been done by James Planché and Gilbert's mentor, Tom Robertson.) In a note to his cast, reproduced in the published text, he set out the manner in which the play should be performed:

It is absolutely essential to the success of this piece that it should be played with the most perfect earnestness and gravity throughout. There should be no exaggeration in costume, make-up, or demeanour; and the characters, one and all, should appear to believe, throughout, in the perfect sincerity of their words and actions. Directly the actors show that they are conscious of the absurdity of the utterances the piece begins to drag.

== First productions ==
Engaged was first presented at the Haymarket Theatre in London on 3 October 1877. It starred George Honey, Kyrle Bellew, Marion Terry, Lucy Buckstone and Julia Stewart. It ran for about 110 performances, until 1 February 1878, when the company's lease on the theatre expired. A provincial tour, led by Honey, with different co-stars, began on 21 February. At the end of the tour the company returned to London and played at the Strand Theatre throughout July and August 1878.

In February 1879 the first American production opened at the Park Theatre, New York, with the comic actor James Lewis as Cheviot and Agnes Booth as Belinda. Productions quickly followed in Philadelphia and Baltimore, earning thousands of dollars in royalties for the author. Productions in Australia and New Zealand followed in the same year.

There were two London revivals in the 1880s: at the Royal Court Theatre opening on 30 November 1881, with H. J. Byron in the lead role, and at the Haymarket from 17 February 1886 starring Herbert Beerbohm Tree.

== Roles and early London casts ==
The casts for the first production and the two 1880s revivals were:

Role	Original cast, Haymarket, 1877	First revival, Royal Court, 1881	Second revival, Haymarket, 1886
Cheviot Hill (a young man of property)	George Honey	Henry J. Byron	Herbert Beerbohm Tree
Belvawney (his friend)	Harold Kyrle (later known as Kyrle Bellew)	Kyrle Bellew	Maurice Barrymore
Mr Symperson	Henry Howe	Clifford Cooper	Mr Mackintosh
Angus Macalister (a lowland peasant lad) (Note: Gilbert's mentor, Robertson, wrote a play, Ours (1866), that had characters called Angus Macalister and Major McGillicuddy.)	Fred Dewar	W. H. Denny	Charles Brookfield
Major McGillicuddy	Mr Weathersby	Gilbert Trent	Ulick Winter
Belinda Treherne	Marion Terry	Marion Terry	Mrs Beerbohm Tree
Minnie (Symperson's daughter)	Lucy Buckstone	Carlotta Addison	Augusta Wilton
Mrs Macfarlane	Emily Thorne	Emily Thorne	Mrs E. H. Brooke
Maggie Macfarlane (a lowland lassie)	Julia Stewart	Adela Measor	Rose Norrets
Parker (Minnie's maid)	Julia Roselle	L. Meredith	Miss Russell Huddart

Source: The Theatre.

== Synopsis ==
=== Act I ===
In the garden of a humble but picturesque cottage, near Gretna, on the border between Scotland and England, Angus Macalister is courting Maggie Macfarlane. Angus makes his living by sabotaging railway lines and selling refreshments and accommodation to passengers from the trains thereby derailed. Two of his victims appear: an eloping couple, Belinda Treherne and Belvawney, who are fleeing from Major McGillicuddy, her previous fiancé.

Belvawney's income – £1,000 a year – depends on a single source. His friend Cheviot Hill persistently proposes to every young woman he meets, and Belvawney is paid by Cheviot's father to thwart all such proposals. If he fails, and Cheviot marries (or dies), the £1,000 a year will go instead to Cheviot's uncle, Symperson. By chance, Cheviot and Symperson have been on the same derailed train as Belinda and Belvawney. With a view to securing the £1,000 annual stipend, Symperson suggests his daughter, Minnie, as a suitable bride for Cheviot. Cheviot agrees, but is almost immediately distracted by the allure of Maggie. He bribes Angus to release her, but as he is congratulating himself on winning her he encounters Belinda, to whom he is instantly attracted. She refuses him, and he vows he will marry Minnie Symperson. As his marriage would remove Belvawney's income this does not suit Belinda at all, and she implores Cheviot to remain single.

Major McGillicuddy now appears, having tracked the eloping pair down, intent on shooting Belvawney. Cheviot saves the situation by pushing Belvawney aside and ostentatiously embracing Belinda. Defying the major's pistols, he and Belinda declare that they are now man and wife. Maggie, Belvawney and the major are all distraught.

=== Act II ===
Three months later, in the drawing room of Symperson's London home, Minnie is preparing for her wedding to Cheviot. Belinda arrives, wearing mourning dress. She explains to her old friend Minnie that she has inadvertently married a complete stranger. She briefly recounts the events at Gretna, and explains that under Scottish law a public declaration of marriage constitutes a legal union. Consequently, though she does not know the name of the man who protected her from the major by declaring himself her husband, and has not seen him since that day, she is legally married to him. She has worn mourning dress ever since, but learning that it is Minnie's wedding day she goes home to change into more suitable clothes.

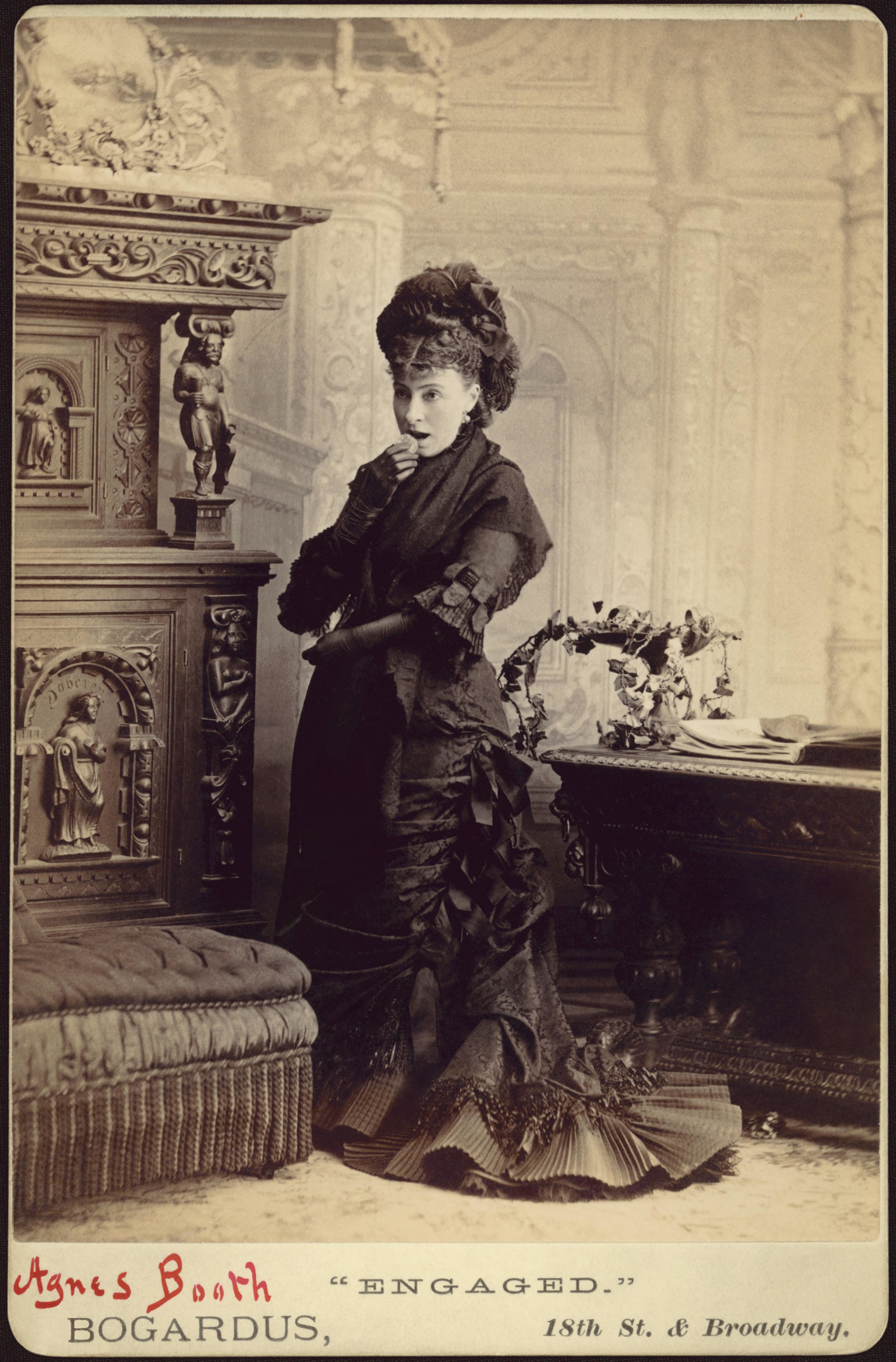
Agnes Booth as Belinda, New York, 1879

Cheviot enters, dressed for his wedding. He is briefly distracted by Parker, the maid, before Minnie returns and they discuss their future, strictly frugal, life. Minnie leaves and Belvawney appears, bemoaning his loss of Belinda. He is appalled to find Cheviot on the brink of matrimony, as this will mean the loss of his £1,000 a year stipend. Having been present throughout the events at Gretna, he can attest that Cheviot is already legally married. Cheviot reflects that the cottage has been demolished and the owners have left the country, and so there is nobody to corroborate Belvawney's account. There is, moreover, some doubt whether the events took place on the English or the Scottish side of the border: if the former he is legally a bachelor. He resolves to go ahead with his marriage to Minnie.

Angus and the Macfarlanes appear. They have been hired as servants to Symperson. Maggie becomes hysterical and tells the truth to the Sympersons: Cheviot proposed to her three months ago and then immediately declared himself married to another woman. Minnie and her father are confused and enraged, even though Cheviot hotly denies having wed a woman whose name he does not even know.

Symperson, fearing the loss of his promised stipend, demands an explanation, but Cheviot cannot give him one. Belvawney enters, assuring everyone that he was present when Cheviot and a certain lady declared themselves to be man and wife several months earlier on the border of England and Scotland. Symperson accepts this, telling his daughter to find herself another husband, and Belvawney to find some other source of income. Finally Belinda enters, now dressed prettily for Minnie's wedding. Belinda and Cheviot recognise each other, and rush into a rapturous embrace. Belvawney staggers back, Minnie faints, and Maggie sobs.

=== Act III ===
Three days later, at Symperson's London house, Belvawney, Belinda and Minnie await Cheviot's return. He has gone to Gretna to try to ascertain the precise location of the events of three months ago. He returns, but has been unable to find out whether the demolished cottage was in Scotland or England.

Symperson enters with two letters. One is from the cottage's owner. Symperson reads that the cottage was "certainly in England". Belinda faints, realising she has lost Cheviot. The other letter is from Belvawney. It says that the Indestructible Bank has stopped payment on Cheviot's shares and they are worthless. When she hears this, Minnie declares her decision to leave Cheviot. Her father is crestfallen. Now he will not get his annual stipend, and he bemoans the shameful materialism of the human race.

Cheviot comes in, even more unhappy than before. None of his three darlings can ever become his wife. He decides to shoot himself, but before he can do so, Belvawney confesses that his letter about the bank was bogus. He then leaves in a cab with Belinda, affectionately entwined. Cheviot vows revenge and swears he will marry anyone. Why not Minnie? Overjoyed, Symperson goes to find his daughter. She shows up, and Cheviot proposes. But when he becomes aware of her mercenary attitude toward his wealth, he renounces her. In desperation, he sends for Maggie Macfarlane. When she arrives, accompanied by her mother and Angus, Cheviot offers marriage to Maggie. She sobs bitterly: she has just filed an action against him for breach of promise. It is already in the hands of her solicitor. Cheviot feels cursed. Mrs Macfarlane even suggests he might marry her, but he draws the line at this, depressed though he is.

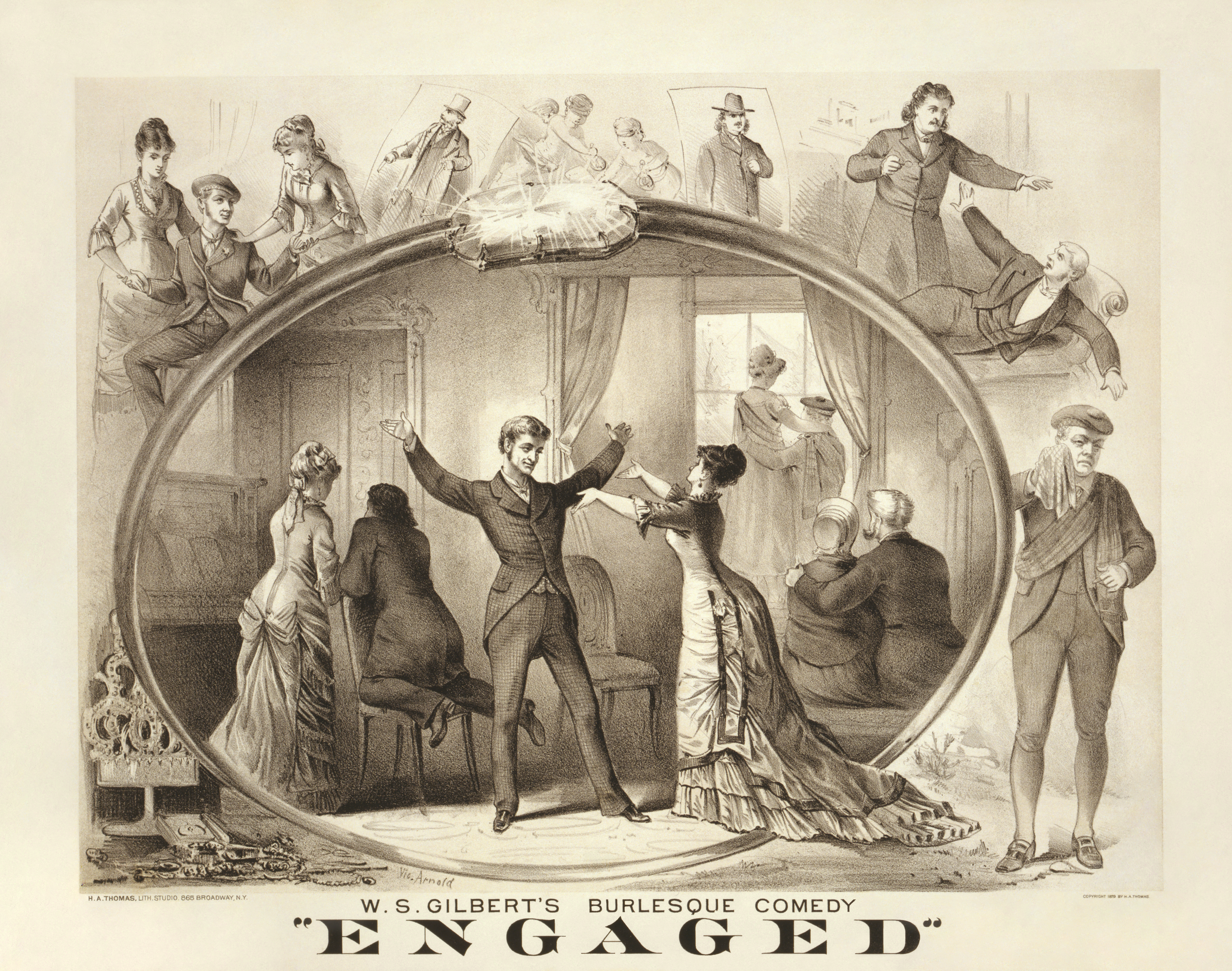
1879 poster for the first American production

Belinda and Belvawney return, followed by Minnie and Symperson. Cheviot's fears are well-grounded, for Belinda and Belvawney are now married. Cheviot draws his gun again, but before he can shoot himself, Symperson decides to reread the letter about the property's location. This time he reads to the end and finds that although the cottage is in England, the garden is in Scotland – and Cheviot married Belinda in the garden. Cheviot embraces Belinda; Belvawney turns to Minnie for comfort, Angus gives solace to Maggie, and Mrs Macfarlane reposes on the bosom of Symperson.

== Revivals and adaptations ==
=== Revivals ===
Engaged was revived in New York in 1886, with Agnes Booth again playing Belinda, opposite Herbert Kelcey as Cheviot. A reviewer in The New York Times noted that "the laughter was almost incessant", but wondered if what he saw as the author's heartlessness would prevent Gilbert's plays from lasting.

After Gilbert's lifetime there were London revivals of Engaged at the Embassy Theatre in 1929; The Old Vic in 1975 by the National Theatre company; the Arts Theatre in 1983; and the Orange Tree Theatre in 2002. Professional productions were mounted at the Pitlochry Festival Theatre, Scotland (2004), and the International Gilbert and Sullivan Festival in Harrogate in 2014.

In the US Engaged was presented Off-Broadway at the Lucille Lortel Theatre in 2004; by the Cincinnati Shakespeare Company in 2009; and by the Irish Classical Theatre Company in Buffalo, New York, in 2010. The Shaw Festival mounted a 2016 production. Amateur productions continue to be presented from time to time on both sides of the Atlantic.

=== Adaptations ===
A 1925 musical version presented in New York had music by Sullivan and several other composers arranged, with additional lyrics, by Brian Hooker. Belinda was played by Antoinette Perry. There were fifteen songs, mostly with words fitted to music by Sullivan, James Molloy, August Röckel and Ciro Pinsuti, with a few new pastiche settings by Porter Steele.

A second musical adaptation of Engaged was created in 1962 by two British academics, George Rowell and Kenneth Mobbs. As in the 1925 American version, new lyrics were fitted to existing tunes, in this case almost all by Sullivan. (Note: Two numbers in the score kept Gilbert's words as well as Sullivan's music: "Pretty Maid of Arcadee" from Thespis, and "As o'er our penny roll we sing" from The Grand Duke. Of the 20 other numbers, three were not to Sullivan's music, using instead tunes from two of Gilbert's other operatic collaborations: one song by F. Osmond Carr from His Excellency, and two by George Grossmith from Haste to the Wedding.) The adaptation was premiered by an amateur company in 1962 and received its first professional production later that year in Windsor. The Times, reviewing the latter, commented, "One might have expected a patchwork, but the play, still extremely amusing, emerges surprisingly whole and unaffected except that by the addition of Sullivan's music its hard brilliance is transmuted as usual to gold". The adaptation had an amateur American premiere in New York in 1965, presented by the Village Light Opera Group, which produced it again in 1984, both times conducted by Ronald Noll. This adaptation was presented at the International Gilbert and Sullivan Festival in 2017.

In 2007 a recording was released of a third musical adaptation of the play, entitled Topsy Turvy Loves, using music from the Gilbert and Sullivan operas but cutting much of the dialogue, and an Equity Showcase production of the adaptation was mounted in 2009 by the Wings Theatre Company in New York.

== Critical reception ==
Engaged divided critics after its first performance. Most reviewers praised the piece for its wit and social comment, but a few found it too biting and misanthropic to be palatable. The Era judged it "one of those clever, fanciful, comical, satirical bits of extravagance in the way of stage work which might be expected from the pen of Mr Gilbert, but hardly from that of any other living author". Calling the play "smart, witty ... humorous ... brilliant" and Gilbert's "most Gilbertian" work, H. Savile Clarke wrote in The Theatre that "assuredly no writer has ever laid bare with a keener scalpel the sham and pretension that underlies the society of today." The reviewer in The Athenaeum wrote, "The experiment has rarely, if ever before, been made of supplying a drama in three acts in which there is not a single human being who does not proclaim himself absolutely detestable", but the critic concluded that whether despite or because of this, Engaged was "one of the most mirthful and original that has, during late years, been seen on the stage".

The New York Times reviewer wrote in 1879, "Mr Gilbert, in his best work, has always shown a tendency to present improbabilities from a probable point of view, and in one sense, therefore, he can lay claim to originality; fortunately this merit in his case is supported by a really poetic imagination. In [Engaged] the author gives full swing to his humor, and the result, although exceedingly ephemeral, is a very amusing combination of characters – or caricatures – and mock-heroic incidents." In a later assessment, T. Edgar Pemberton called the piece "whimsically conceived and wittily written" and judged it "a gem of the first water, with its every facet cut and polished to the point of resplendency".

Reviewing the National Theatre's production in 1975, Irving Wardle thought Engaged "a play that falls short of the world masterpiece class, but that merits revival as a popular entertainment expressing its own period with unusual clarity". Michael Billington called it "rather a stolid jape", although he later called it an unjustly neglected classic. Reviewers of the 1983 London revival were divided: in The Guardian, Kenneth Hurren thought it apart from "a few quaint jocularities, merely a tedious old play". while in The Times, Anthony Masters thought it "mercilessly honest and extremely funny ... with a cynicism that makes Ben Jonson and Wycherley seem full of the milk of human kindness". More recent productions have been well received. Patrick O'Connor wrote of the 2003 Orange Tree production, "What is delightful in the complicated plot, with its insistence on the mercenary side of love and friendship, is that many of the lines have a contemporary ring to them and the situations seem to foreshadow the theatre of the absurd". Reviewing the 2004 Off-Broadway production, Marilyn Stasio wrote in Variety, "a sparkling period piece ... the dialogue is a pure gift from a brilliant dramatist and thoroughly dyspeptic man". In a 2016 study of the makers of modern culture, Justin Wintle called Engaged "unquestionably the finest and funniest English comedy between Bulwer-Lytton's Money [1840] and Wilde's The Importance of Being Earnest [1895] which it directly inspired".

== Influence ==
As edgy as the smiling brutality of Joe Orton ... To see Engaged on stage is to watch The Importance of Being Earnest discovering its long-lost father, and the works of Noël Coward their dashing, bewhiskered grandad.

— The Village Voice, 2004.

In a 1971 study of Gilbert's works, Arthur Liebman remarks on the debt The Importance of Being Earnest owed to Engaged: "similarities in situations, characters, names, dialogue and stage effects which are indeed inescapable to the knowledgeable reader". Bernard Shaw, in his capacity as a theatre critic, remarked – disapprovingly – on the "Gilbertism" of Wilde's plot. Shaw thought himself a better writer than Gilbert and resented being seen as Gilbertian, but Liebman cites the influence of Engaged on Shaw's plays, commenting that Shaw drew on "Gilbert's contradictions between the romantic façade of society and its pound-sterling basis" to comic effect in Man and Superman and for a more serious purpose in Widowers' Houses. In a 1968 study, Shaw, Wilde and the Revival of the Comedy of Manners, J. H. K. Lockhart suggests that Shaw similarly drew on Gilbert in Arms and the Man.

Other critics have observed that the influence of Engaged extends beyond Shaw to Noël Coward and Joe Orton, and to the Theatre of the Absurd.

== Notes, references and sources ==
=== Sources ===
==== Books ====
- Ainger, Michael (2002). Gilbert and Sullivan – A Dual Biography. Oxford: Oxford University Press. ISBN 978-0-19-514769-8.
- Booth, Michael (1973). English Plays of the Nineteenth Century, Volume III: Comedies. Cambridge: Cambridge University Press. OCLC 553925270.
- Booth, Michael (1991). Theatre in the Victorian Age. Cambridge: Cambridge University Press. ISBN 978-0-521-34837-9.
- Crowther, Andrew (2011). Gilbert of Gilbert & Sullivan: his Life and Character. London: The History Press. ISBN 978-0-7524-5589-1.
- Liebman, Arthur (1971). The Works of W. S. Gilbert. New York: New York University. OCLC 52734567.
- Holroyd, Michael (1997). Bernard Shaw: The One-Volume Definitive Edition. London: Chatto & Windus. ISBN 978-0-7011-6279-5.
- Orel, Harold (1994). Gilbert and Sullivan: Interviews and Recollections. Basingstoke: Macmillan. ISBN 978-0-333-63905-4.
- Pemberton, T. Edgar (1902). Ellen Terry and Her Sisters. London: C. Arthur Pearson. OCLC 5636519.
- Rollins, Cyril; R. John Witts (1962). The D'Oyly Carte Opera Company in Gilbert and Sullivan Operas: A Record of Productions, 1875–1961. London: Michael Joseph. OCLC 504581419.
- Shaw, Bernard (1981). Dan Laurence (ed.). Shaw's Music: The Complete Music Criticism of Bernard Shaw, Volume 3 (1893–1950). London: The Bodley Head. ISBN 978-0-370-30248-5.
- Stedman, Jane W. (1996). W. S. Gilbert, A Classic Victorian and His Theatre. Oxford: Oxford University Press. ISBN 978-0-19-816174-5.
- Wintle, Justin (2007). New Makers of Modern Culture. Vol. 1: A–K. London: Routledge. ISBN 978-0-415-42547-6.

==== Journals ====
- Cardullo, Robert (2012). "The business of art and the art of business: W. S. Gilbert's "Engaged" reconsidered". CLA Journal. 40 (4): 244–261. JSTOR 3044731. (subscription required)
- Knapp, Shoshana (March 1986). "George Eliot and W. S. Gilbert: Silas Marner Into Dan'l Druce". Nineteenth-Century Fiction. 55 (3): 438–459. doi:10.2307/3044731. JSTOR 44395296. (subscription required)
- Lockhart, J. H. K. (Spring 1968). "Shaw, Wilde and the Revival of the Comedy of Manners". Hermathena (106): 18–22. JSTOR 23039863. (subscription required)
