= The Gilded Highway =

1926 film

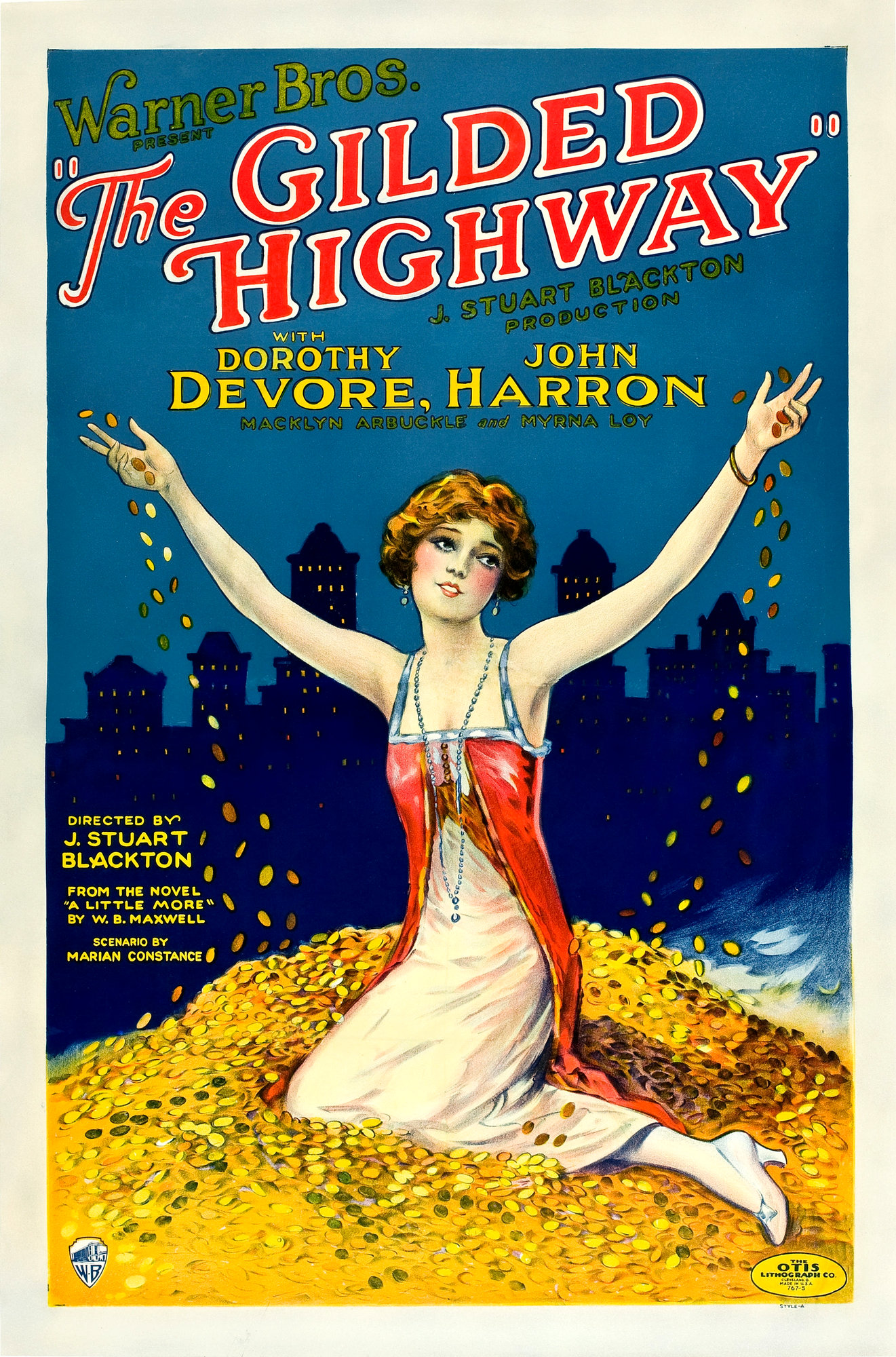
- Film poster
- Directed by: J. Stuart Blackton
- Written by: Marian Constance Blackton (adaptation)
- Based on: A Little More by William Babington Maxwell
- Starring: Dorothy Devore; John Harron; Macklyn Arbuckle
- Cinematography: Nicholas Musuraca
- Production company: Warner Bros.
- Distributed by: Warner Bros.
- Release date: June 19, 1926
- Running time: 74 minutes
- Country: United States
- Language: Silent (English intertitles)

The Gilded Highway is a lost 1926 American silent drama film directed by J. Stuart Blackton and starring Dorothy Devore, John Harron, and Macklyn Arbuckle.

== Plot ==
As described in a film magazine review, a rich uncle dies and leaves money to the Welby family. The results are disastrous. Young Jack Welby abandons Amabel, the young woman he is engaged to; his sister Primrose quits her fiancé Hugo Blythe; and the whole family goes in for high living. In the end when they are broke, they come to their senses, but not before all family members experience considerable grief. A faithful former servant who runs their old home as a boarding house comes to their assistance. The lovers are reunited.

== Cast ==
- Dorothy Devore as Primrose Welby
- John Harron as Jack Welby
- Macklyn Arbuckle as Jonathan Welby
- Myrna Loy as Inez Quartz
- Florence Turner as Mrs. Welby
- Sheldon Lewis as Uncle Nicholas Welby
- Andrée Tourneur as Amabel
- Gardner James as Hugo Blythe
- Mathilde Comont as Sarah
- Thomas R. Mills as Adolphus Faring

== Censorship ==
Before the film could be exhibited in Kansas, the Kansas Board of Review required the shortening of the comedic dance scene, where the girl falls into the man's arms.

== Preservation ==
With no prints of The Gilded Highway in any film archives, it is a lost film.
