= Mr. Potter of Texas (film) =

1922 silent film

- Directed by: Leopold Wharton
- Written by: George Rader
- Based on: Mr. Potter of Texas by Archibald Clavering Gunter
- Starring: Macklyn Arbuckle; Louiszita Valentine; Corene Uzzell
- Production company: San Antonio Pictures
- Distributed by: Producers Security Corporation
- Release date: June 15, 1922
- Running time: 50 minutes
- Country: United States
- Languages: Silent; English intertitles

Mr. Potter of Texas is a 1922 American silent comedy film directed by Leopold Wharton and starring Macklyn Arbuckle, Louiszita Valentine and Corene Uzzell. It is based on the 1888 novel of the same title by Archibald Clavering Gunter.

== Cast ==
- Macklyn Arbuckle as Mr. Potter of Texas
- Louiszita Valentine as Ida Potter
- Corene Uzzell as Lady Annerly
- Robert Frazer as Charles Errol
- Raymond Hodge as Ralph Errol
- Gloria Smythe as Amy Lincoln
- Gerard Witherby as Lt. Dean
- Harry Carr as The Levantine

== Bibliography ==
- Munden, Kenneth White. The American Film Institute Catalog of Motion Pictures Produced in the United States, Part 1. University of California Press, 1997.
