= Corene Uzzell =

American actress (1889 – 1938)

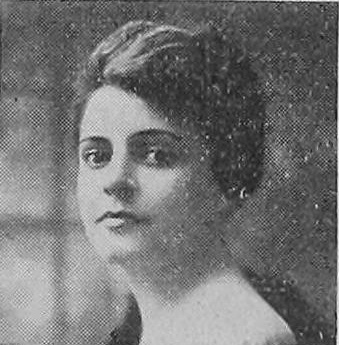
- Born: October 15, 1889; Houston, Texas, United States
- Died: November 2, 1938 (aged 49); Malabar, Florida, United States
- Occupation: Actress
- Years active: 1917–1922 (film)

Corene Uzzell (1889–1938) was an American film actress of the silent era.

In 1905, Uzzell acted with the Murray and Mack company. Film studios for which she worked included Essanay, Famous Players, Mirror, and Pathe.

== Selected filmography ==
- Seven Keys to Baldpate (1917)
- On Trial (1917)
- The Song of Songs (1918)
- A Woman of Impulse (1918)
- Conquered Hearts (1918)
- The Oakdale Affair (1919)
- Thunderbolts of Fate (1919)
- The Invisible Ray (1920)
- Determination (1922)
- Mr. Potter of Texas (1922)

== Bibliography ==
- Goble, Alan. The Complete Index to Literary Sources in Film. Walter de Gruyter, 1999.
