= Maclyn Arbuckle =

American actor (1866–1931)

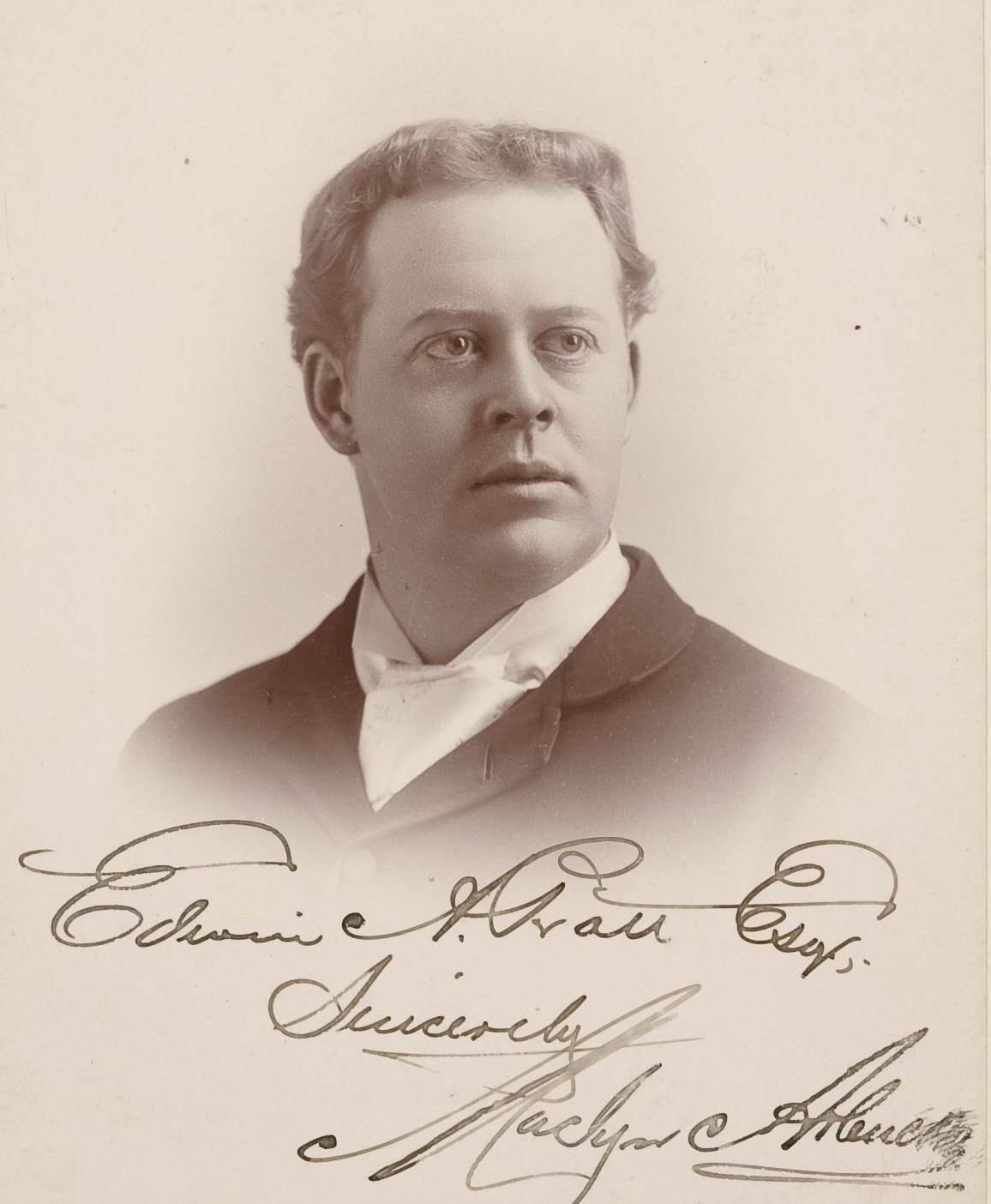
- Born: July 9, 1866; San Antonio, Texas, US
- Died: March 31, 1931 (aged 64); Waddington, New York, US
- Other name: Macklyn Arbuckle
- Occupations: Film and stage actor
- Spouse: Elizabeth Carlisle (m. 1903)
- Relatives: Andrew Arbuckle (brother); Roscoe "Fatty" Arbuckle (cousin)

Maclyn Arbuckle (Note: His given name is sometimes spelled Macklyn) (July 9, 1866 – March 31, 1931) was an American screen and stage actor. He was the brother of actor Andrew Arbuckle and cousin of comedian Roscoe "Fatty" Arbuckle. Arbuckle delivered the line "Nobody loves a fat man," when he played the character Sheriff "Slim" Hoover in the play The Roundup. His cousin Roscoe played the role in the subsequent film version.

== Early life ==
Arbuckle was born in San Antonio, Texas, on July 9, 1866. The son of Mr. and Mrs. James Arbuckle, he was educated in Glasgow before studying law in Boston. When he was 21, he was admitted to the bar.

== Career in show business ==
He stopped practicing law after a year and became an actor. The change of careers came after Arbuckle lost an election for justice of the peace. In a journal entry dated December 1888, he wrote why he hoped to not practice law much longer: "The profession is overcrowded and clients can dictate fees. I have set my heart on other fields where I can get something for my labor, and as soon as an opportunity offers I will go on the stage, where I can have the same chance at the 'greenbacks' and silver of this country."

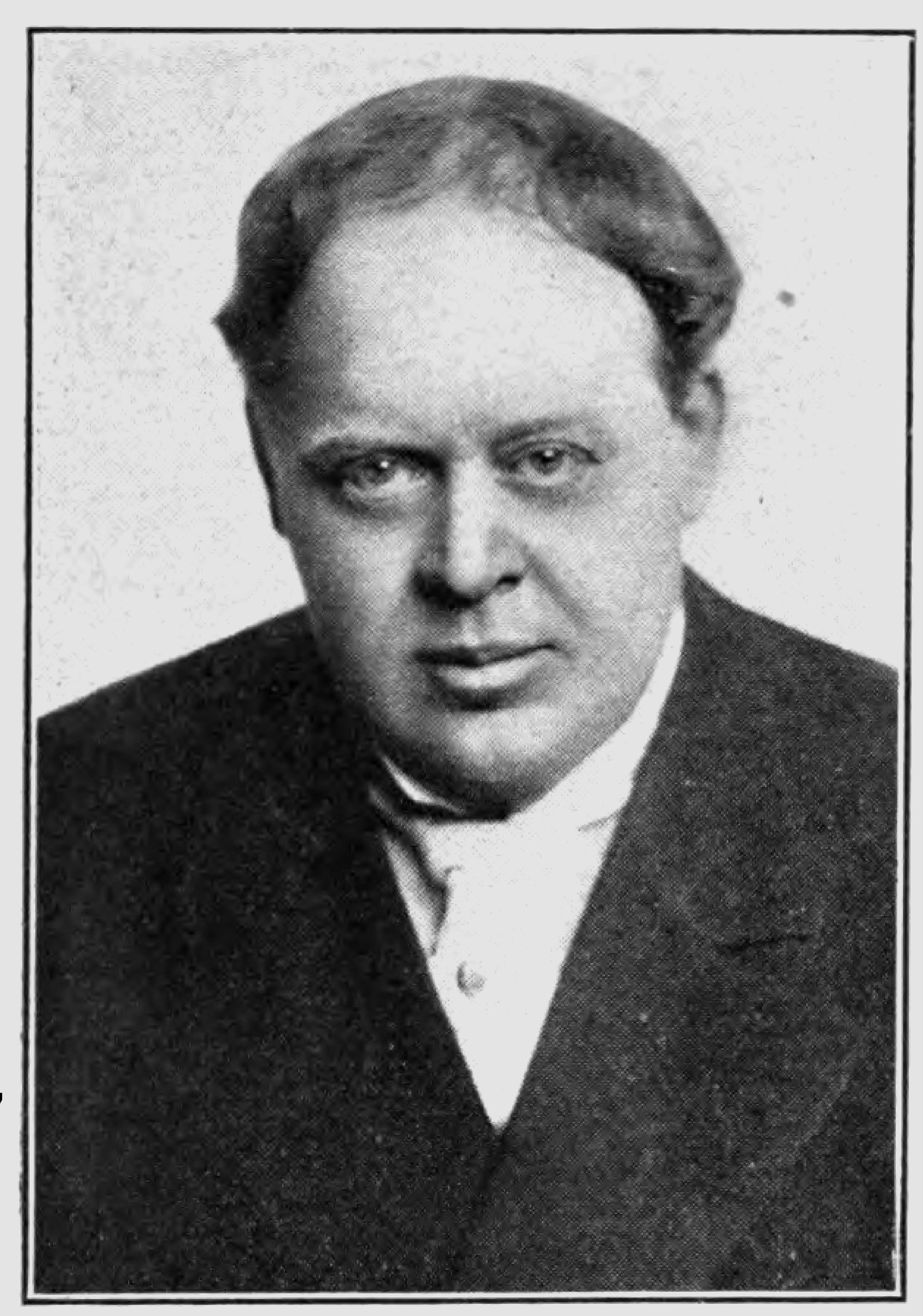
Maclyn Arbuckle

Arburckle debuted on stage in Shreveport, Louisiana, on December 25, 1888. For four years, he acted in a company headed by R. D. McLean. His first Broadway play, Why Smith Left Home, was in 1899. Some of his many Broadway successes were The County Chairman (1903) (which he made as a silent film in 1914), The Round Up (1907) with Julia Dean (and which Roscoe Arbuckle made as a silent in 1920) and revivals of older plays like The Rivals and She Stoops To Conquer. He entered silent films with Adolph Zukor's Famous Players Film Company in 1914 as an established Broadway star.

=== San Antonio Moving Pictures Corporation ===
In May 1919, Arbuckle started the San Antonio Moving Pictures Corporation in San Antonio. A group of Dallas businessmen provided financial backing. The company produced four films, Mr. Bingle (1922), Mr. Potter of Texas (1922), Welcome to Our City (1922) and Squire Phin (1922) before folding in 1922.

=== Hearst productions ===
In the 1920s Arbuckle appeared often with Marion Davies in lavish costume motion picture productions financed by William Randolph Hearst.

== Personal life ==
Arbuckle married Elizabeth Carlisle on June 29, 1903, in Newton, Massachusetts. She was an actress, who, after her marriage, was billed as Mrs. Macklyn Arbuckle. The couple had no children.

== Death ==
Arbuckle died of heart disease on March 31, 1931, at his home in Waddington, New York, aged 64.

== Filmography ==
- The County Chairman (1914) – The Honorable Jim Hackler
- It's No Laughing Matter (1915) – Hi Judd
- The Reform Candidate (1915) – Art Hoke
- National Red Cross Pageant (1917) – Baron Fitz-Walter – English episode
- Fighting Mad (1919)
- Squire Phin (1922) – Phineas Look, 'Squire Phin'
- Welcome to Our City (1922) – Jim Scott
- The Prodigal Judge (1922) – Judge Slocum Price
- Mr. Potter of Texas (1922) – Mr. Potter of Texas
- The Young Diana (1922) – James P. May
- Mr. Bingle (1922)
- Broadway Broke (1923) – P.T. Barnum
- Yolanda (1924) – Bishop La Balue
- Janice Meredith (1924) – Squire Meredith
- The Thoroughbred (1925) – Peter Bemis
- That Old Gang of Mine (1925) – Sen. Jim Walton
- The Lure of the Track (1925)
- The Gilded Highway (1926) – Jonathan Welby
