= My Official Wife (1914 film) =

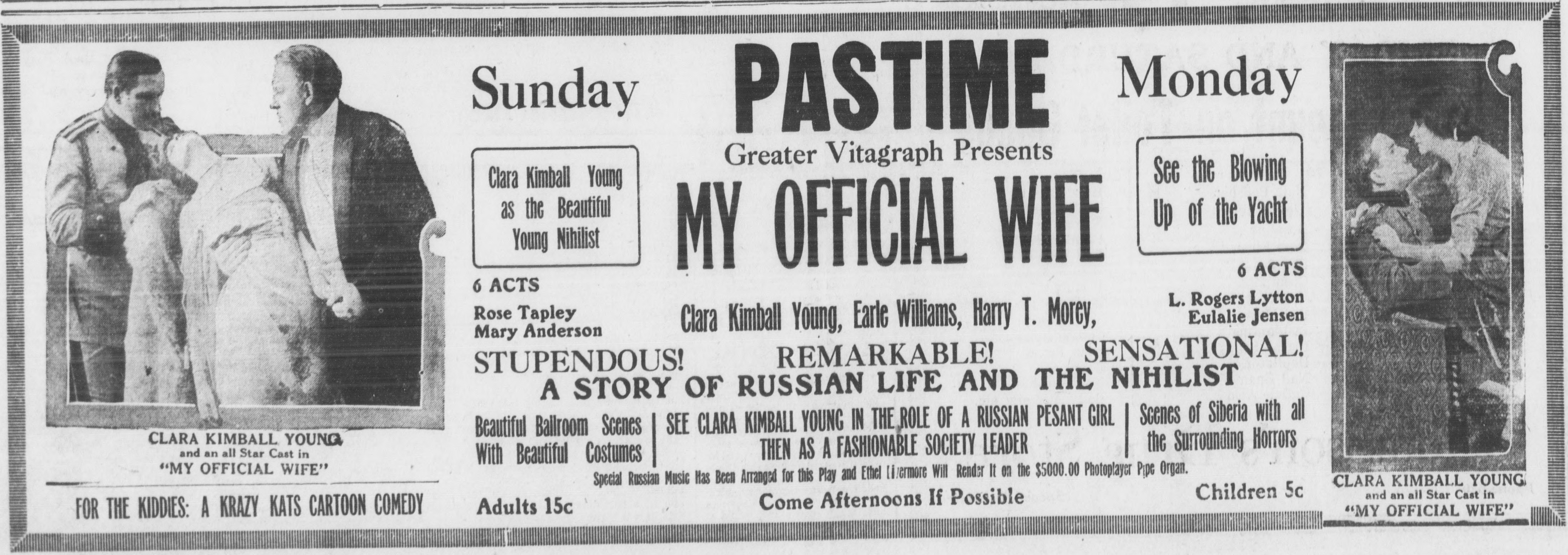
- 1917 advertisement for the film
- Directed by: James Young
- Written by: Marguerite Bertsch; Richard Henry Savage
- Starring: Clara Kimball Young, Earle Williams
- Cinematography: Robert A. Stuart
- Production company: Vitagraph Studios
- Distributed by: General Film Company
- Release date: July 13, 1914
- Running time: 5 reels
- Country: United States
- Languages: Silent; English intertitles

My Official Wife is a 1914 American silent film directed by James Young and starring Clara Kimball Young, Harry T. Morey and Rose E. Tapley.

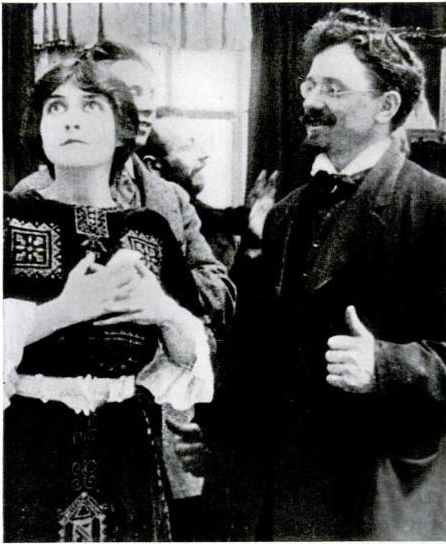
Clara Kimball Young, star of 1914 silent film, with extra once claimed to be Leon Trotsky.

The film was based on a novel by Richard Henry Savage, and was first adapted to film in 1914 by Vitagraph Studios, starring Clara Kimball Young and Earle Williams, and directed by Young's husband James Young. The movie opened on July 13, 1914. Sime Silverman's review for Variety was mixed on the film, concluding that five-reels was too long, though he admitted that the scene of a boat being torpedoed at the end might go over well with audiences. Though the story is set in Russia, Silverman noted that the film "never dares go into the open because it was made so far away from any place even resembling the land of the Czar that the studio posing and setting becomes extraordinarily obvious."

Clara Kimball Young later estimated she had appeared in more than 100 films before My Official Wife, but this was the film that launched her as a star. When Motion Picture Magazine conducted a popularity contest in 1914, Earle Williams finished first and Young came in second. (Mary Pickford came in third). Young credited Vitagraph founder J. Stuart Blackton's supervision as responsible for the success of her emotional portrayal in the film. But now a hot commodity, Young soon signed with Lewis J. Selznick.

Based on its prior success, Vitagraph re-issued the film in late 1916.

Speculation once abounded that Leon Trotsky appeared in the film as an extra, based in part on a shot of Young with a bearded man with a resemblance to the man. Though this claim started appearing as early as 1918 and was vouched for by actors in the film, and was often repeated, the story was always specious and has been discredited. Trotsky was not in the United States in 1914, and he denied reports made during his life about alleged film appearances. The film also possibly had a young Rudolf Valentino as an uncredited extra, though this claim cannot be verified, as Vitagraph Studios head Albert E. Smith made a number of claims that later caused skepticism.

Though the full movie is now lost, two short clips were compiled in the 1931 Vitaphone short The Movie Album and still survive. One of the clips includes "Trotsky", which was played up in the press promotion for the release.

== Film cast ==
- Helen Marie by Clara Kimball Young
- Arthur Bainbridge Lenox by Harry T. Morey
- Laura, his wife by Rose E. Tapley
- Marguerite, their daughter by Mary Anderson
- Basile Weletsky, her husband by Arthur Cosine
- Baron Friederich, Chief of the Russian Secret Police by L. Rogers Lytton
- Eugenie, his spy by Eulalie Jensen
- Constantine Weletsky by Charles Wellesley
- Olga, his wife by Louise Beaudet
- Sacha, their nephew by Earle Williams
- Sophie, their child by Helen Connelly
