= Justin Wintle =

English author, editor and journalist (born 1949)

Justin Wintle (born 1949) is an English author, editor and journalist who has contributed to a wide variety of media-outlets. Born in London, the son of film and television producer Julian Wintle, he was educated at Stowe School and Magdalen College, Oxford. He is also Chairman of the Bình Hòa massacre Trust Fund.

== Non-fiction works ==
- The Dictionary of Biographical Quotation (with Dr Richard Kenin, 1978)
- Makers of Modern Culture (1981)
- Makers of Nineteenth Century Culture (1982)
- The Dictionary of War Quotations (1989)
- Romancing Vietnam (1991)
- Furious Interiors: R.S. Thomas, Wales and God (1996)
- The Vietnam Wars (1992)
- The Rough Guide History of China (2002)
- The Timeline History of China (2002)
- The Rough Guide History of Islam (2003)
- The Rough Guide History of Spain
- New Makers of Modern Culture (2006)
- Perfect Hostage: A Life of Aung San Suu Kyi (2007)

== Fiction works ==
- Paradise for Hire (1984)
- Mortadella (1985)
