= Archibald Clavering Gunter =

British-American writer

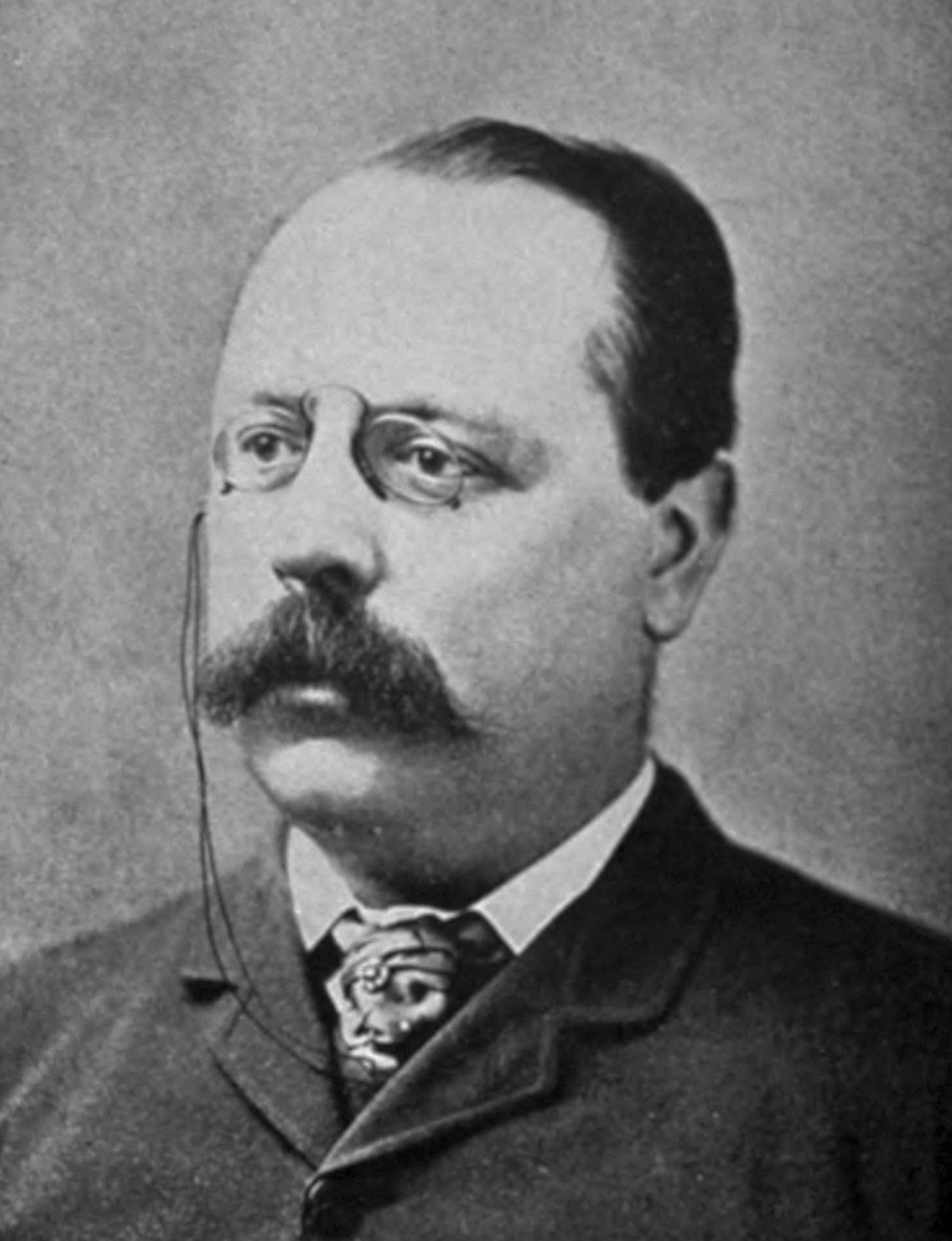
- Born: October 25, 1847; Liverpool, Lancashire, United Kingdom
- Died: February 24, 1907 (aged 59); New York City, New York, United States
- Occupations: Novelist; playwright; publisher
- Writing career
- Notable work: Mr. Barnes of New York

Signature
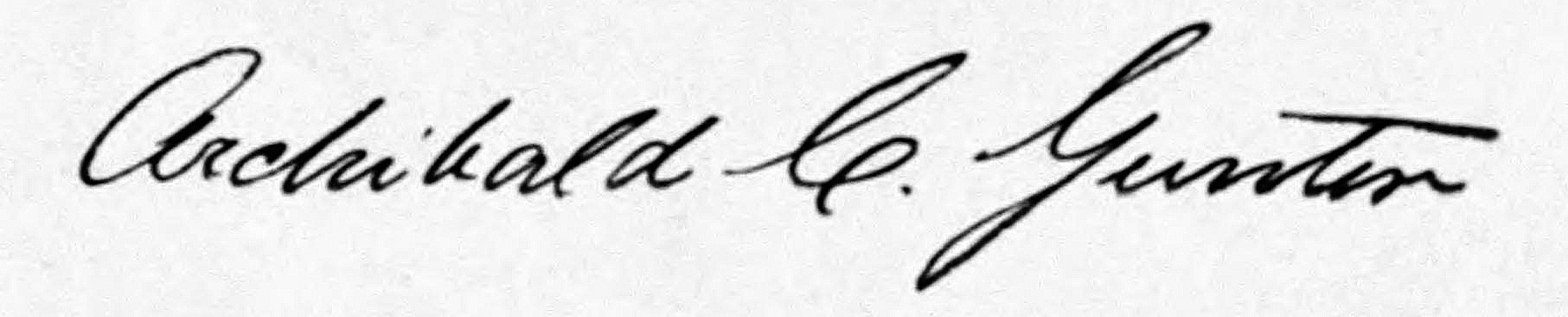

Archibald Clavering Gunter (25 October 1847 – 24 February 1907) was a British-American writer primarily known today for authoring the novel that the film A Florida Enchantment was based upon, and for his hand in popularizing "Casey at the Bat". He clipped the original publication of the poem from the San Francisco Examiner and passed it on to DeWolf Hopper, whose performances brought it fame.

Born in Liverpool, Gunter's family emigrated to the United States when he was six and settled in San Francisco. In 1879 he moved to New York. Gunter was a playwright and prolific self-published novelist, novels that were translated into other languages and adapted several times into films. His Home Publishing Company also published Gunter's Magazine (1905–1907), featuring short fiction or serialized novels by himself and others. He also published others' novels, including ones by Richard Henry Savage and Gilbert Parker.

== Selected works ==
- 1872 – Found the True Vein, a play dealing with life in a mining camp
- 1880 – Two Nights in Rome, a play
- 1881 – Fresh, the American, a comedy about a Yankee who rescues an Egyptian harem girl
- 1886 – Prince Karl, written as serious drama, actor Richard Mansfield recast it as a farce
- 1887 – Mr. Barnes of New York, a book about an adventurer, allegedly sold three million copies, though certainly was quite popular even if sales claims were inflated. Adapted to film in 1914 and again in 1922.
- 1888 – Mr. Potter of Texas
- 1889 – That Frenchman
- 1890 – Miss Nobody of Nowhere
- 1890 – Small Boys in Big Boots
- 1892 – My Official Wife, play adaptation of novel by Richard Henry Savage
- 1892 – Miss Dividends
- 1892 - A Florida Enchantment, co-authored with Fergus Redmond
- 1893 – Baron Montez of Panama and Paris
- 1894 – A Princess in Paris
- 1894 – The Kings Stockbrother
- 1895 – The First of the English
- 1897 – Susan Turnbull; or, The Power of Woman, a novel set at Dr. Andrew Turnbull's New Smyrna settlement

== Sources ==
- Author and Bookinfo.com
