= Caroline Hill =

English actress (1845 – c. 1926)

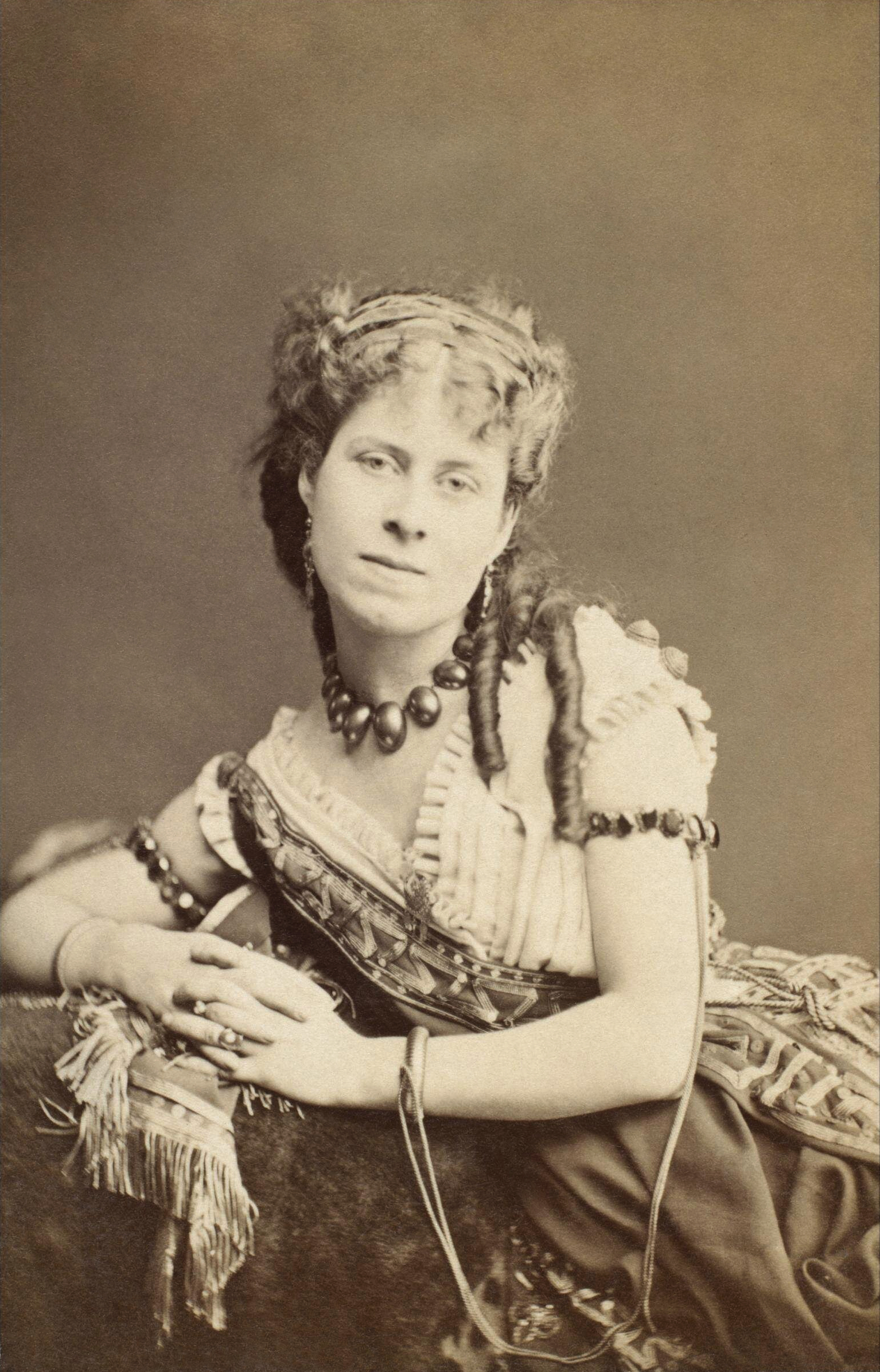
- Hill as Mirza in The Palace of Truth (1870)
- Born: June 1845; York, England
- Died: c. 1926 (aged 80–81)
- Spouse: Herbert Kelcey

Caroline Lucreza Brook Hill (June 1845 – c. 1926) was an English actress. She began acting as a child actor in the company of Samuel Phelps and soon joined the company of J. B. Buckstone at the Haymarket Theatre. There she created roles in several new plays, including some by W. S. Gilbert, in whose plays she continued to act later in her career. She played at various London and provincial theatres in the 1870s. Hill married actor Herbert Kelcey in 1883, with whom she had begun to appear on stage. The couple played mostly in New York City in the 1880s, and Hill continued to act through the 1890s, mostly in England.

== Early life and career ==
Hill was born in York, the youngest child of the comic actor John Brownlow Hill and his wife, also an actress, Caroline Bessie née Knights. She began to act as a child, in about 1861, in roles such as Mamilius in A Winter's Tale and Arthur in The Life and Death of King John, in the company of Samuel Phelps at Sadler's Wells Theatre. A young relative was the actress Agnes Knights, with whom she appeared in New Babylon at the Duke's Theatre.

In a review of a production of Mrs White in July 1862 at the Haymarket Theatre, Hill is described as "from the Theatre Royal, Edinburgh". Hill was in the cast of Joseph Stirling Coyne's farce Duck Hunting in March 1863. With the company of J. B. Buckstone at the Haymarket, she created original roles, earning critical praise. These included roles in The Favourite of Fortune (1866), Mary Warner (1869), New Men and Old Acres (1869; with Madge Kendal), The Palace of Truth (1870; as Mirza) and Pygmalion and Galatea (1871; as Cynisca), the last two by W. S. Gilbert. She also appeared in a revival of All for Her by John Palgrave Simpson and Herman Charles Merivale. During this time, she was married to (in 1867) and divorced from (in 1869) Henry Reginald Featherstonhaugh of Paddington, then part of Middlesex. The couple had one surviving child, a son, Albany Featherstonhaugh (1867–1954).

Advertisements appeared in December 1871 and January 1872 offering lessons by her for pupils wishing to prepare for the stage at her address in Notting Hill. In 1874 Hill performed for charity with the Canterbury Old Stagers, an amateur group, at Colchester Theatre, Tom Taylor's comedy Nine Points of the Law. The comedietta Tears followed, in which Hill played Mrs Vivien. She performed at the Mirror Theatre in 1875, described as "lively and picquant in a character well suited to her powers" in Self by John Oxenford and Horace Wigan. Hill was Mary Rivers in All for Her at St James's Theatre in March the following year. She was in the cast of Delicate Ground at the Royal Princess's Theatre in June 1876.

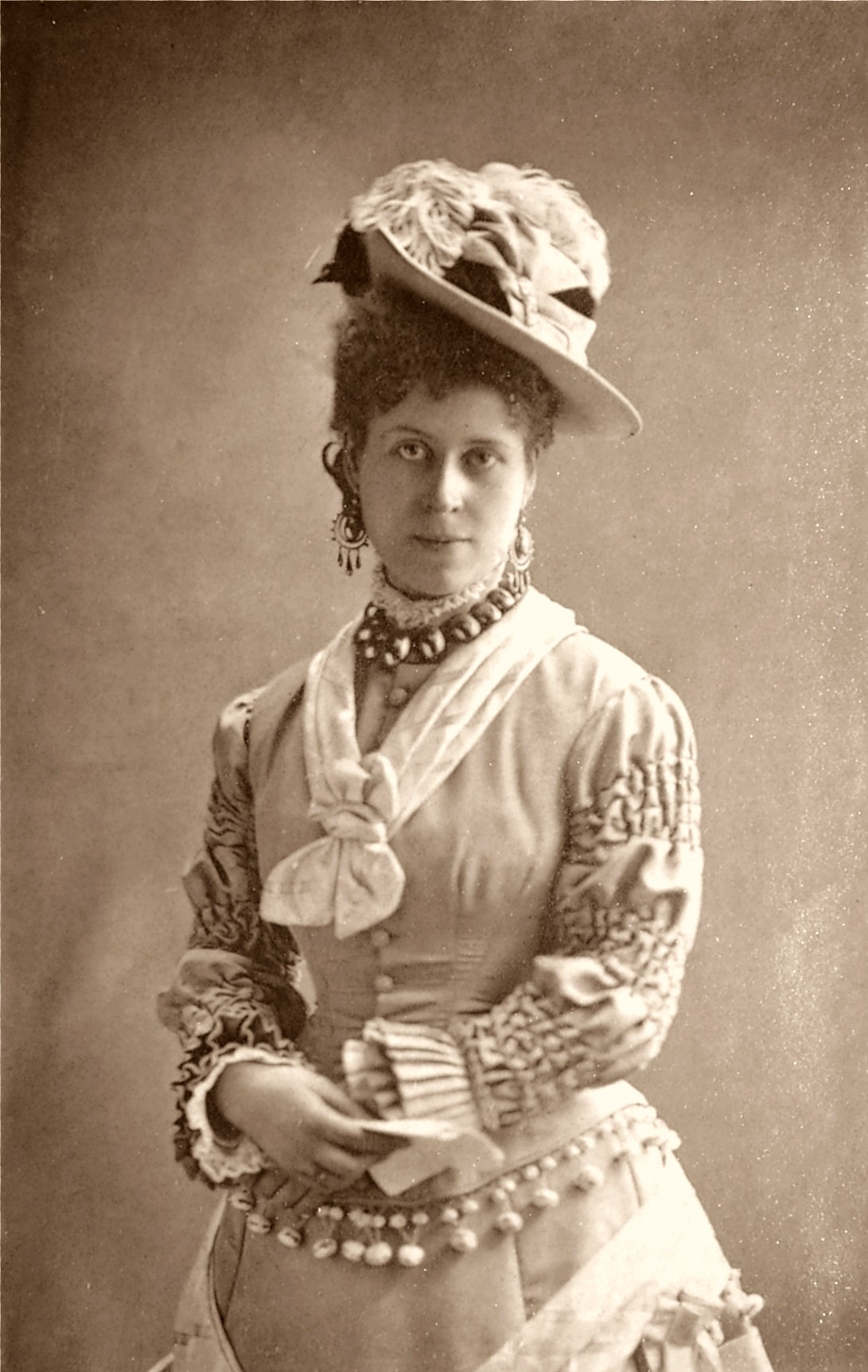
Photograph of Hill

A full page photo of Hill appears on the cover of The Illustrated Sporting and Dramatic News of 4 November 1876. In 1877 at the Theatre Royal, Bath, in The Annual Amateur Performance, she performed with amateurs in The Honey Moon by John Tobin. Back at the Haymarket that April, she reprised her role of Mirza in The Palace of Truth. At the Theatre Royal, Nottingham, Hill played Lilian Herries in April 1878, when she was described as one of the most charming actresses on the English stage. In July 1878 she was in Dan'l Druce, Blacksmith, by W. S. Gilbert, at the Gaiety Theatre. The following month at her Benefit night at Theatre Royal, Edinburgh, Hill played Maud Callender in The Vagabond by Gilbert. In November she took a 12 night engagement at Theatre Royal, Landport, in the comedy-drama A Scrap of Paper! by John Palgrave Simpson.

At the Duke's Theatre in 1879, she appeared in New Babylon by Paul Meritt. In 1881 she was in the cast of Youth at the Theatre Royal, Drury Lane, where in 1882 she appeared in Pluck, by Henry Pettitt and Augustus Harris, as Florence Templeton. In March 1882 Hill appeared as Bess with her future husband Herbert Kelcey as Harold Armytage in George Robert Sims's The Lights o' London at Theatre Royal, South Shields. They both appeared in Pettit and George Conquest's play Queen's Evidence at the Pavilion Theatre in July 1882, as Gilbert and Kate Medland. Hill married Kelcey in 1883.

== New York and later years ==
Invited to New York with her husband by Lester Wallack in 1883, Hill was a success in the role of Lady Dolly Vanderdecken in "Moths" at Wallack's Theatre. The following year, she played Fanny Gainsborough in The Pulse of New York, then appeared in Confusion and Old Love Letters, together with her husband, at the Park Theatre in Brooklyn, New York. She portrayed Lady Hilda in Broken Hearts, by W. S. Gilbert, at the Madison Square Theatre in 1885. The next year, she starred as the wife of the title character in Jim, the Penman in an American summer tour.

Hill and her husband were reported as being in London in 1890: "Miss Hill has been before the public a good many years, and is still young; but it is not every lady of her age on whom nearly a quarter of a century of stage service leaves so insignificant a mark." In October 1890 Hill was at the Standard Theatre, New York, in Reckless Temple, by Augustus Thomas, as Mrs Billingsley, where her performance was described as "something of a disappointment". She returned to England in the early 1890s when her marriage with Kelcey ended. In 1892, she played Lady Jones in The Guardsman by George R. Sims and Cecil Raleigh at the Court Theatre; a reviewer wrote that she "doesn't look as if she is out of her teens, plays with great spirit and success as a fashionable society lady". She remained at that theatre until at least 1893. In 1896 Hill played Dora Thornhaugh in Home at the Haymarket Theatre.

She participated in the Lydia Thompson Farewell, a five-hour Benefit for the latter actress, staged at the Lyceum Theatre, on 2 May 1899.

Hill died in Dartford, Kent, in late 1925 or early 1926.
