= Pollyanna (play) =

1915 play by Catherine Chisholm Cushing

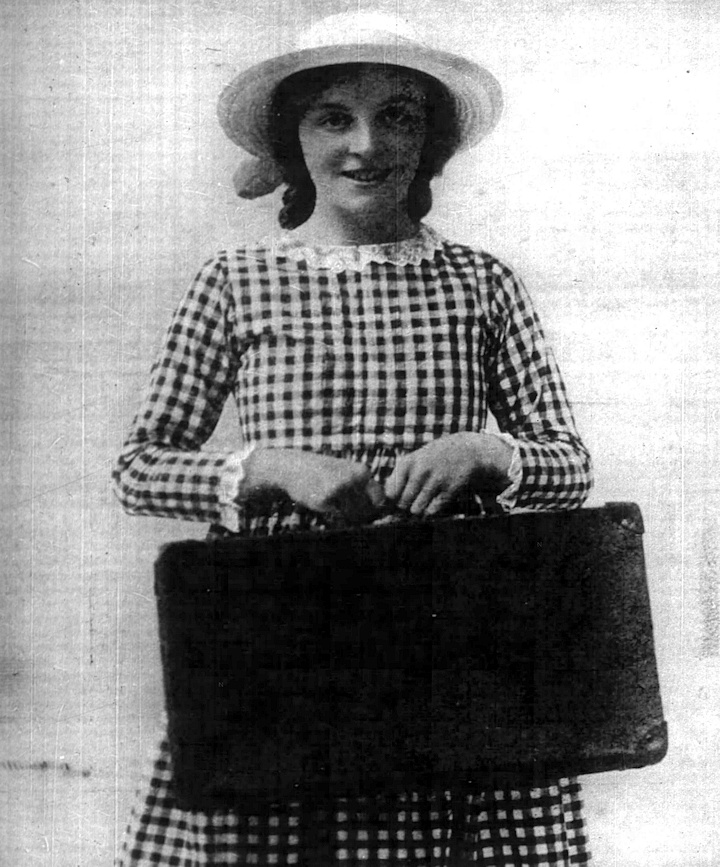
- Patricia Collinge as Pollyanna
- Original language: English
- Written by: Catherine Chisholm Cushing
- Based on: Pollyanna (1913) by Eleanor H. Porter
- Subject: Sentimental optimism
- Genre: Comedy
- Setting: A parlor and a private library in a New England village

Premiere
- Date: September 18, 1916
- Place: Hudson Theatre
- Directed by: Frederick Stanhope

Pollyanna sometimes sub-titled The Glad Play or The Glad Girl, is a 1915 play by Catherine Chisholm Cushing, based on the 1913 novel by Eleanor H. Porter. It is a four-act comedy with two settings and eleven characters. The action of the play takes place in a New England village over a five year time period. The story concerns an orphan girl whose cheerful demeanor is infectious, unlocking long frozen hearts.

The play was produced by George C. Tyler, with financial backing from Klaw and Erlanger who owned it. Staging was by Frederick Stanhope, with Patricia Collinge as the eponymous lead. It had a tryout in Detroit in August 1915, then went on an extended tour starting with Chicago. It premiered on Broadway during September 1916. It ran three months on Broadway and continued touring until the 1920 silent film with Mary Pickford put an end to the play's commercial viability.

Though successful, the play was never revived on Broadway, nor was it adapted to other media, the subsequent Pollyanna films in 1920 and 1960 having gone back to the book for their screenplays.

== Characters ==
Characters are listed in order of appearance within their scope.

Lead

- Pollyanna Whittier, is 12, recently orphaned and come to live with her aunt in a New England village.

Supporting

- Nancy is Miss Polly's impudent Irish servant, a lone Catholic among Protestant "heathen". (Note: When her friends remonstrate over Nancy's impertinance, Miss Polly confesses Nancy is the least objectionable of the six servants she has hired and fired that summer.)
- Miss Polly Harrington is Pollyanna's maternal aunt, a stern and seemingly haughty woman.
- Jimmy Bean is an orphan, twelve years old at play's start.
- John Pendleton is a bachelor, called "the hermit", who was once in love with Pollyanna's mother.
- Doctor Chilton, called Tom, is Pendleton's friend and Miss Polly's old flame.

Featured

- Mrs. Carmody, called Ruthie, is a harsh member of the local Ladies' Aid.
- Miss Carroll is a member of the local Ladies' Aid, a spiteful spinster.
- Mrs. Gregg is also a member of the local Ladies' Aid, a kinder soul than the other two.
- Bleecker is Pendleton's longtime British servant; Nancy and him share a mutual disdain for each other.
- The Nurse is mentioned in Act II, but never appears in the published play. (Note: The role is credited in contemporaneous newspaper review cast lists while the Chauffeur is not, so this was a featured part created when the play was first staged, a year after Cushing had completed her writing commission.)

Bit player

- Chauffeur carries Pollyanna into the library in Act III.

Quadruped

- Sodom is a kitten at play's start.
- Gomorrah is a puppy at play's start.

Off stage

- Charity Whittier was Pollyanna's mother and Miss Polly's sister, dead two years before start of play.
- Whittier was a Protestant missionary bishop and Pollyanna's late father, who taught her the Glad game.
- Various villagers are referred to who Pollyanna has helped through her cheerfulness and optimism.

== Synopsis ==
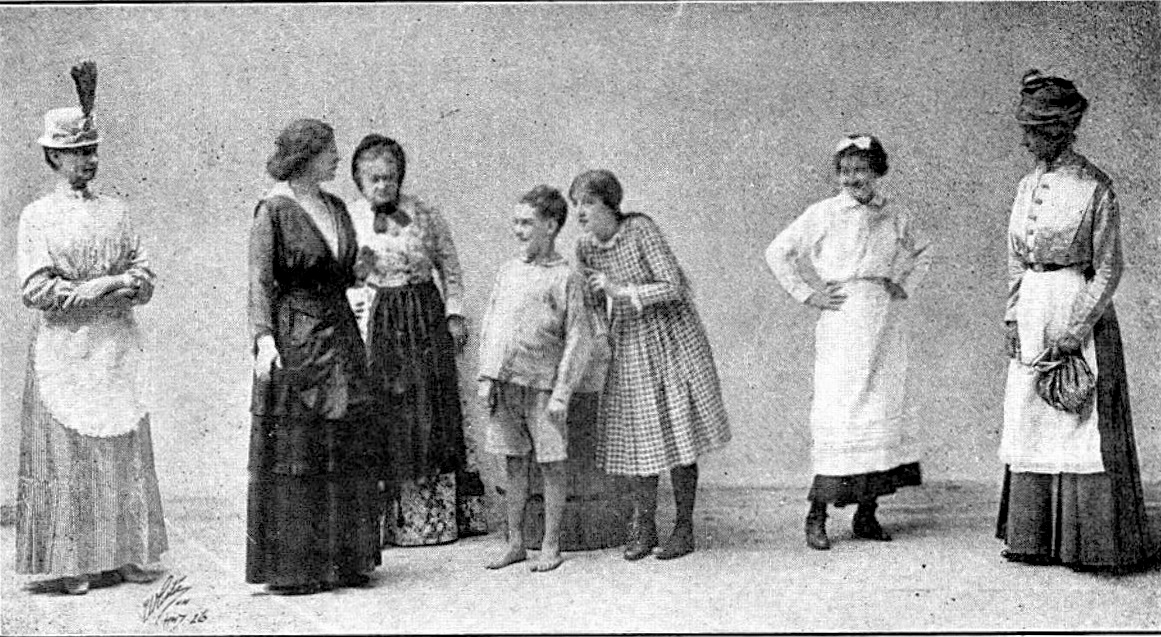

Act I (Miss Polly Harrington's parlor, a summer afternoon.) Mrs. Carmody, Miss Carroll, and Mrs. Gregg are sewing and packing old clothes into a missionary barrel. (Note: A form of New England Christian charity, originally meant for overseas missionaries and their charges, but which later was used for poor people in the United States.) They are aghast at Nancy's free tongue and astonished at Miss Polly's news about her niece coming to live with her. When Pollyanna does arrive, she charms Aunt Polly and Mrs. Gregg a little, but not the others. Pollyanna says there wasn't any black clothing in the last barrel they received, so she lacks mourning clothes. Her father told her to be glad when he died, for he would go to Heaven. (Note: "Heaven?" exclaimed the ladies. Yes, Pollyanna replied... he said after fifteen years missionary work in the Ozark Mountains, anywhere else is bound to be Heaven.) She explains the Glad game to them and gets the Aid ladies to try. Spying a doll on a chair, Pollyanna thinks it is for her, but Aunt Polly says no, its for the barrel. Pollyanna then brings in her own gift for Miss Polly, a basket with a tiny kitten and puppy, who she introduces as Sodom and Gomorrah. The ladies become hysterical and Aunt Polly sternly orders Nancy to take away the animals. Pollyanna picks up Aunt Polly's locket and opens it, telling everyone there's a pretty man inside. Aunt Polly grabs the locket and hustles Pollyanna to her bedroom. Aunt Polly confides that Pollyanna was out the window before she could stop her. Pollyanna re-enters the parlor, bringing Jimmy Bean, who she announces is another gift for Aunt Polly. This is the last straw: the ladies are dismissed, Jimmy is told to shove off, and Pollyanna given the rules of the house. She is distressed to learn that Aunt Polly sent for her only out of a sense of duty. Sobbing to herself, she is surprised by Jimmy's reappearance. He explains there's a castle next door with an ogre in it no one ever sees. They decide to explore it but are forestalled by Aunt Polly's scolding. (Curtain)

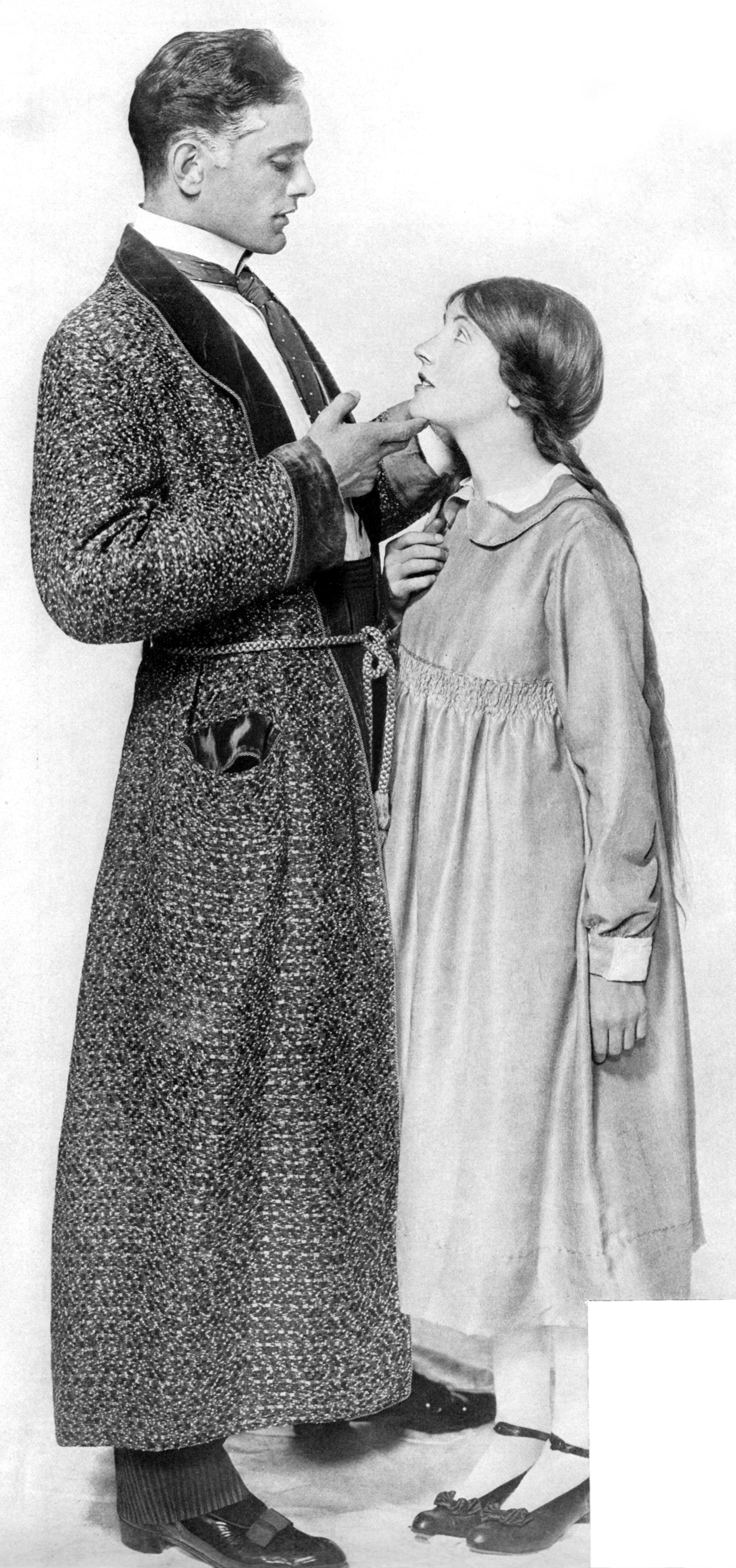

Act II (John Pendleton's Library. Some weeks later.) Pendleton scolds Bleecker over his insistence on having seen a ghost come through the hedge. Dr. Chilton visits, and reminds Pendleton of how the Harrington sisters were once their loves. He informs Pendleton about the new girl who has cured all the hypochondriacs in the village and cheered the truly ill with her "Glad game". He confesses to having sicced her on Pendleton: "Old King Grouch" as she has labelled him. A sudden knocking on a cabinet door, and out pops Pollyanna. Dr. Chilton had told her about the secret passage between the houses, made twenty years before. Pollyanna slowly thaws Pendleton's heart with a fairy-tale she was told by her mother. A king had loved a princess, but they were forced apart by her father. The princess was forced to marry and to save souls, but still loved the king and prayed for him every night. Pendleton is entranced that his long-lost Charity Harrington had still loved him and prayed for him, even though married. He shows Pollyanna a large portrait of her mother, who Pollyanna resembles. Pollyanna is stunned; for the first time her composure breaks, and she cries out to the portrait, "Mother, come back to me! Nobody wants me!" She sobs until Pendleton comforts her, saying she can stay with him if Aunt Polly doesn't want her. Dr. Chilton is alarmed; Polly Harington won't allow it. But even as he and Pendleton debate, Pollyanna reappears, with her hat and suitcase. (Two quick curtains, each opening on a still tableau of Pollyanna and Pendleton embracing, and Dr Chilton beaming.)

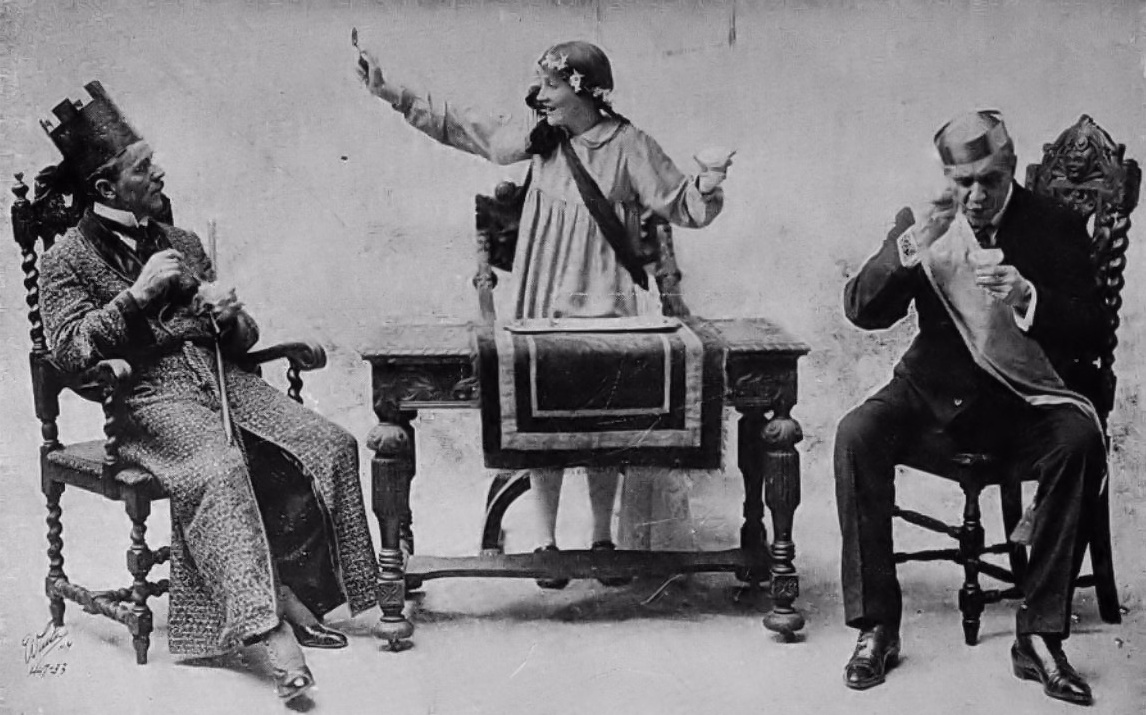

Act III (Same as Act II. An hour later.) Pollyanna, Chilton, and Pendleton are eating ice cream. Bleecker announces Nancy, who has brought Pollyanna's things. Since Aunt Polly doesn't want her, Pollyanna wants to stay with Pendleton. But Aunt Polly appears and demands Pollyanna return with her. She insists that she wants her niece. As she takes Pollyanna by the hand, her locket falls from its chain. Pollyanna picks it up, opens it and recognizes Dr. Chilton's photo. Aunt Polly refuses to let Dr. Chilton see the locket, but that is enough to convince him. He is delighted she has worn his photo over her heart for twenty years. Later, Pollyanna sneaks back into the library through a window, bringing the basket with Sodom and Gomorrah, who Pendleton reluctantly agrees to keep. Next, Jimmy Bean comes through the window, and Pollyanna beseeches Pendleton to adopt him. As a trustee of the Orphanage, Pendleton agrees to let Jimmy stay until they know each other better. Pollyanna departs, but soon there is a great commotion from outside. A car has struck her. She is brought into the library, where she discovers she can't stand or walk. Pendleton, however, uses her own philosophy to cure her despair. (Curtain)

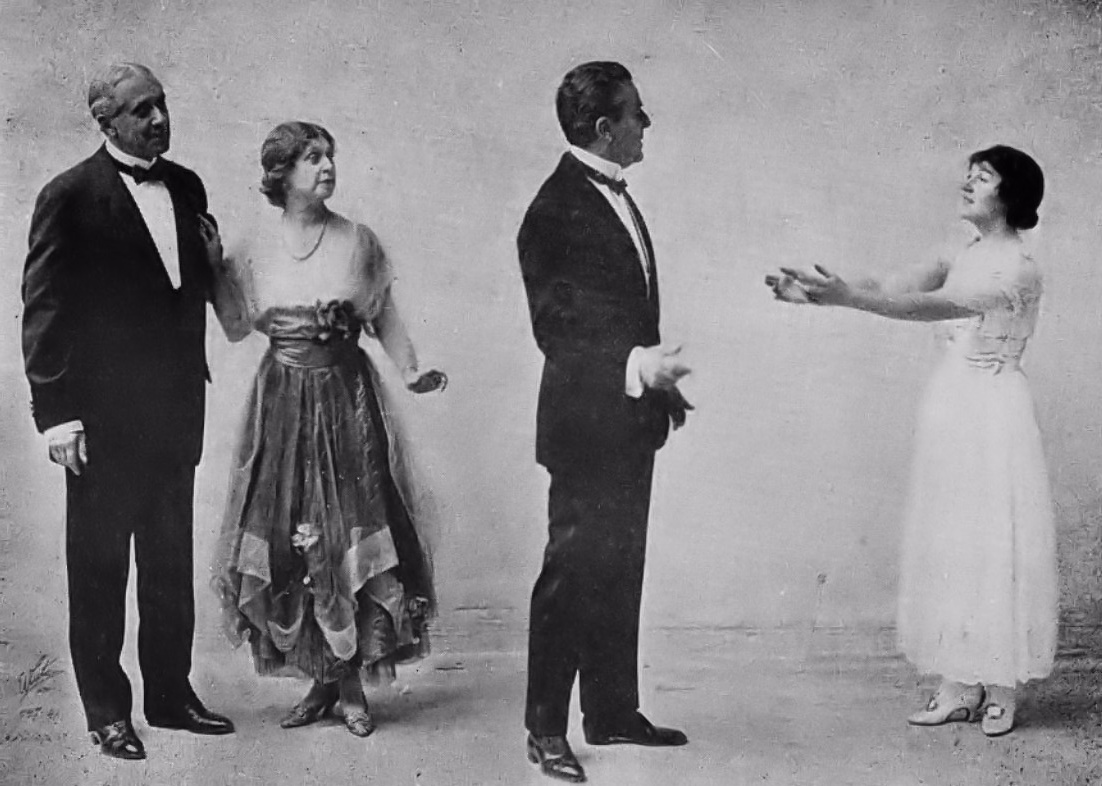

Act IV (Same as Act III. Five years later, a summer evening.) Bleecker and Pendleton are fixing up the library to celebrate Pollyanna's return from Europe, where she has been treated by medical specialists. Jimmy Bean, now James Pendleton, returns from a horseback ride to describe the throng waiting at the train station. Nancy explains though that Pollyanna has come by auto, and will arrive shortly. Dr. Chilton and Miss Polly, now Mrs. Chilton, arrive. They were married in Paris, but like Nancy won't tell Pendleton if Pollyanna is cured. Finally Pollyanna herself comes in, obviously cured. Pollyanna and Jimmy confess their love and agree they are engaged. They kiss, but are surprised by the adults. Pendleton calls for Bleecker to bring in "the menagerie", which he does, carrying a fully-grown Sodom and leading a giant Gomorrah. Pollyanna marvels at their survival and size. They then play the Glad game, with Pollyanna stepping forward last to face the audience and extoll its benefits. (Curtain)

== Original production ==
=== Background ===
Producer George C. Tyler was the co-founder of Liebler & Company, a theatrical production and management firm that was a major independent producer of plays in the first decade of the 20th Century. When Eleanor H. Porter's Pollyanna proved popular, Tyler secured the stage rights to it for Liebler & Company, and commissioned Catherine Chisholm Cushing to do the dramatic treatment. However, a cash crisis brought on by the rise of motion pictures and the start of World War I forced Liebler & Company into receivership during December 1914. Though ousted from control, Tyler was able to steer Liebler's ownership of the stage rights for Pollyanna to his sometime associate, Abe Erlanger. Shocked by the bankruptcy, Tyler was at loose ends in Spring 1915, when Erlanger approached him about going back to work. Klaw and Erlanger would supply the initial financing for Pollyanna, (Note: In later years they would have been credited as "executive producers".) with Tyler handling the actual production role.

Cushing's treatment showed characters Pollyanna and Jimmy Bean at two very different ages, 12 and 17. After some consideration, Tyler decided while Jimmy could be played by two different actors, Pollyanna would need an actress who could play both ages. Patricia Collinge, a native of Dublin, had enjoyed several years of success on American stages. At age 22, she was quite diminutive; so short in fact that at one theater that lacked stairs she couldn't scramble onto the stage from the audience area like the other performers, and so had to be lifted up by director Frederick Stanhope.

Klaw and Erlanger announced Pollyanna would be on their fall schedule in early June 1915. A few weeks later it was reported that Patricia Collinge had been signed for the lead. Effie Shannon and Herbert Kelcey were signed next, with casting complete by early August and rehearsals starting in Detroit's Opera House. A journalist who witnessed a last dress rehearsal reported that Patricia Collinge "swept through every scene with ease and grace", until "she had to climb a steep flight of shaky stairs". Frightened, she balked until Philip Merivale and Herbert Kelcey held her hands and reassured her.

=== Cast ===
Cast from first performance through the Broadway run. Production was on hiatus from April 23 through September 17, 1916.
Role	Actor	Dates	Notes and sources
Pollyanna Whittier	Patricia Collinge	Aug 23, 1915 - Dec 23, 1916	
Nancy	Jessie Busley	Aug 23, 1915 - Dec 23, 1916	
Miss Polly	Effie Shannon	Aug 23, 1915 - Dec 23, 1916	An interview with Herbert Kelcey said Shannon was Mrs. Kelcey in private life. (Note: The article is unclear as to whether this was a statement by Herbert Kelcey or an inference by the anonymous interviewer.)
Jimmy Bean, age 12	Bobby Tobin	Aug 23, 1915 - Dec 23, 1916	Tobin was from "the popular family of Tobin child actors".
John Pendleton	Philip Merivale	Aug 23, 1915 - Dec 23, 1916	
Dr. Chilton	Herbert Kelcey	Aug 23, 1915 - Dec 23, 1916	Kelcey and Effie Shannon also had a professional partnership, often performing together.
Mrs. Carmody	Maude Granger	Aug 23, 1915 - Dec 23, 1916	
Miss Carroll	Helen Weathersby	Aug 23, 1915 - Dec 23, 1916	
Mrs. Gregg	Maud Hosford	Aug 23, 1915 - Dec 23, 1916	
Jimmy Bean, age 17	Lorin Raker	Aug 23, 1915 - Dec 23, 1916	Raker "may be described as a protégé of William Allen White".
Bleecker	Harry Barfoot	Aug 23, 1915 - Dec 23, 1916	
The Nurse	Lola Eville	Aug 23, 1915 - Aug 28, 1916	
The Nurse	Carolyn McLean	Aug 30, 1915 - Dec 23, 1916	

=== Tryout and opening tour ===
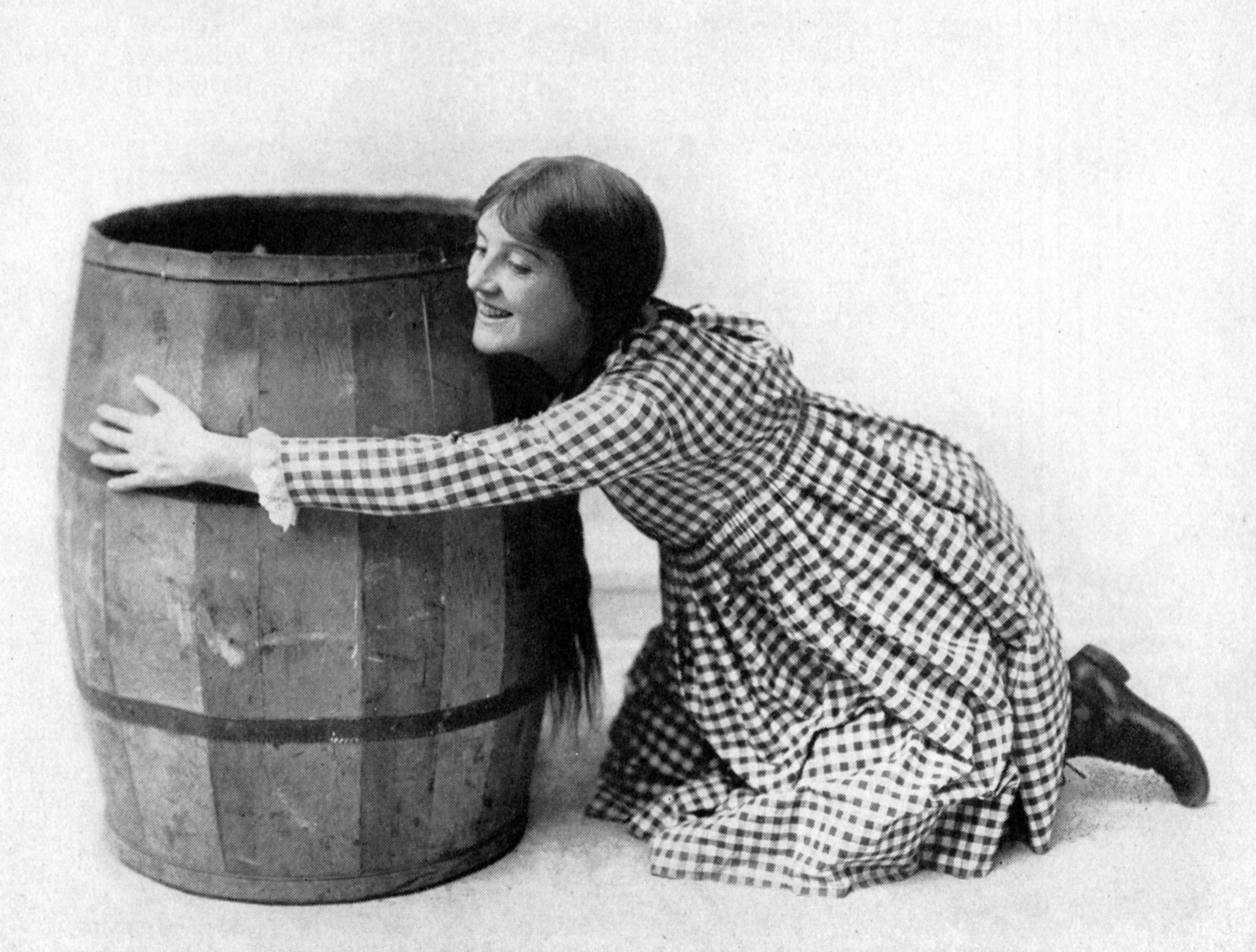

The first performance of Pollyanna was given at Detroit's Opera House on August 23, 1915. Local critic George P. Goodale wrote a review that bordered on hagiography: cast, production, and writing were all perfect and greatly enjoyed by the audience. He named the entire credited cast and their roles, saying "the company is one of exceptional talents and reputation." Following a week there, the production went to Chicago's Blackstone Theatre, where it opened on August 30, 1915. Percy Hammond of the Chicago Tribune was more circumspect, recognizing the play's popularity but avoiding judgement on its dramatic value. He suggested that in spirit and appeal it resembled Mrs. Wiggs of the Cabbage Patch, The Man from Home, and Daddy Longlegs. He was approving of Patricia Collinge's Pollyanna, saying "I can think of no other actress who wears a halo so well".

Initially booking a run in Chicago through December, the producers decided instead to close after nine weeks on October 30, 1915. From there Pollyanna was performed in St. Louis, Kansas City, Indianapolis, Minneapolis, and elsewhere until the tour finished up in Atlantic City, New Jersey on April 22, 1916. The production then went on hiatus until September 1916, when the cast was reconvened for Broadway. While most reviews from the tour were positive, Caryl B. Storrs of the Star Tribune was quite down on the play, comparing the character of Pollyanna to Little Eva in Uncle Tom's Cabin and sympathizing with the actors having to perform in "so futile and obvious a play".

=== Broadway premiere and reception ===
The Broadway premiere for Pollyanna came at the Hudson Theatre on September 18, 1916. The reception by Broadway critics was muted; few newspapers bothered to review a work that had been first performed a year earlier. The Brooklyn Daily Times reviewer said "Here's another comedy of sheer sentiment and here's another success!" and gave a wry summmation: "Oh, its lots of fun." The critic for the New-York Tribune implied that the play was 95% sugar, and said "It was a success last night at the end of the second act", and complimented Patricia Collinge for doing "as much as any actress could have done to make the character plausible".

The New York Times reviewer declined to offer any suggestions for improving Pollyanna: "Criticism of such a play would be futile because it achieves its purpose-- it makes a great many people glad.... The fact that it is a crudely constructed play, that all of its situations are hackneyed, that it often mixes pathos with bathos and that some will depart determined never to be pleasant again, does not matter. It oozes sentimentality and the crowd will love it." (Note: Both the New-York Tribune and The New York Times reprinted an error in their cast lists for the play that was due to an earlier advertising mistake. The error misidentified the actors playing Jimmy Bean as Stephen Davis and Taylor Graves. An actual playbill program from the premiere however, shows the part continued to be played by Bobby Tobin and Lorin Raker.)

=== Broadway closing ===
Pollyanna closed at the Hudson Theatre on December 23, 1916, after a fourteen week run. The production recommenced touring, starting with the Hollis Street Theatre in Boston on Christmas Day 1916.

== Bibliography ==
- Catherine Chisholm Cushing. Pollyanna: A Comedy in Four Acts. Samuel French, 1923.
- George C. Tyler and J. C. Furnas. Whatever Goes Up. Bobbs Merrill, 1934.
