= It's a Great Life =

It's a Great Life may refer to:

- It's a Great Life (TV series), an American television series
- It's a Great Life (1929 film), a 1929 American comedy film
- It's a Great Life (1935 film), a 1935 American drama film directed by Edward F. Cline
- It's a Great Life (1943 film), a 1943 American black-and-white film
