= Catherine Chisholm Cushing =

American writer (1874–1952)

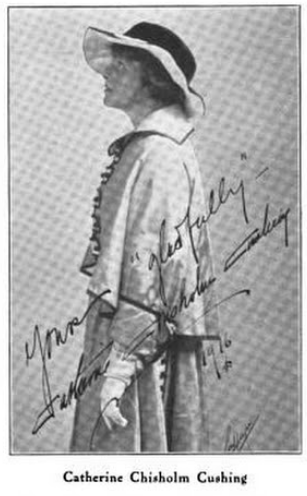
Catherine Chisholm Cushing, from a 1916 publication

Catherine Chisholm Cushing (April 15, 1874 — October 19, 1952) was an American writer of songs, librettos, and plays, best known for her 1916 stage adaptation of Eleanor H. Porter's Pollyanna.

== Early life ==
Catherine Chisholm was born in Mount Perry, Ohio. She attended the Pennsylvania College for Women in Pittsburgh.

== Career ==
Cushing started her literary career as an editor at Harper's Bazaar, before finding success as a writer on Broadway. Her first show, The Real Thing (1911), was a comedy that ran for sixty performances and starred Henrietta Crosman and Minnie Dupree. This was followed by her Widow by Proxy (1913) with May Irwin, Kitty MacKay (1914), Sari (1914, book by Cushing and Eugene Percy Heath), Jerry (1914) starring Billie Burke, Pollyanna (1915, based on the book by Eleanor H. Porter), Glorianna (1918-1919, a musical based on Cushing's own Widow by Proxy), Lassie (1920, a musical version of Kitty MacKay), Marjolaine (1922), Topsy and Eva (1924-1925, a burlesque based loosely on Uncle Tom's Cabin), Edgar Allan Poe (1925), and The Master of the Inn (1925-1926, based on a book by Robert Herrick).

Film adaptations of plays or stories by Cushing include Kitty MacKay (1917), Widow by Proxy (1919) starring Marguerite Clark, Pollyanna (1920) starring Mary Pickford, Don't Call Me Little Girl (1921) starring Mary Miles Minter, Topsy and Eva (1927) starring Rosetta Duncan and Vivian Duncan, and The Prince and the Pauper (1937, based on the book by Mark Twain). Songs by Cushing included "L'amour, toujours, l'amour" (1922, music by Rudolf Friml), which was on several film soundtracks, and ""Love's Own Sweet Song (Sari Waltz)" (1947).

Her Topsy and Eva was among the first American musicals adapted for early television; a one-hour version aired in July 1939. "Possibly because the program was so racist, history has chosen to forget this broadcast," commented one historian of television.

== Personal life ==
Catherine Chisholm married Henry Howard Cushing in 1904. She was widowed in 1937 and died in New York in 1952, aged 78 years.
