= Herbert Kelcey =

English-born American stage and film actor

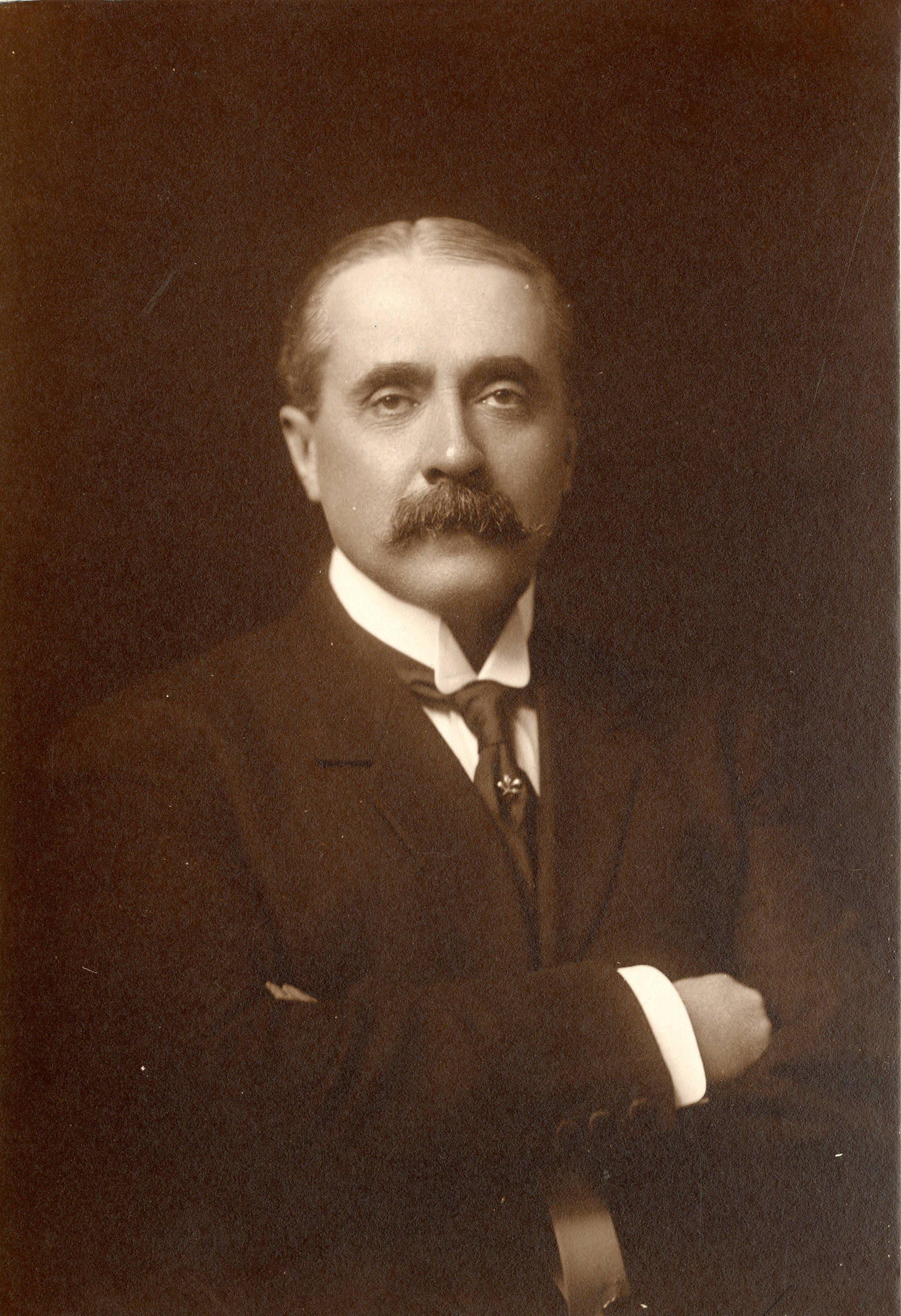
- Kelcey in 1908
- Born: Herbert Henry Lamb; 10 October 1856; London, England
- Died: 10 July 1917 (aged 60); Bayport, New York, U.S.
- Resting place: Saint Anns Cemetery, Suffolk County Sayville, New York
- Occupation: actor
- Years active: 1877–1917
- Spouse(s): Caroline Hill; Effie Shannon (speculative or possibly common law)

Herbert Kelcey (10 October 1856 – 10 July 1917) born Herbert Henry Lamb, was an English-born American stage and film actor.

== Biography ==
Born in 1856 in London, Kelcey made his stage debut at Brighton, in 1877 and had his first appearance in London in 1880. He went to New York and first appeared at Wallack's Theatre in 1882. He appeared in many society dramas. In the 1890s he formed a partnership with Effie Shannon that mimicked English husband-wife acting teams like the Bancrofts and the Kendals. In 1902 Kelcey became the second actor in America to play Sherlock Holmes after William Gillette.

== Personal ==
Kelcey was married to actress Caroline Hill from the 1870s to the early 1890s. Some film and theater sources claim he was later married to Shannon, whom he was in a theatrical partnership with, but there is no evidence they were ever married. Shannon had been married to Henry Guy Carleton from 1890 to 1892 so she would've been free to marry Kelcey when they began their theatrical partnership. Kelcey died in 1917 and Shannon long outlived him. When she died in 1954 she was buried beside him in Saint Anns Cemetery in Sayville New York.

== Selected plays ==
- The Silver King (1883)
- The Harvest (1893; a one act play later re-used as the second act of three act work The Most and the Flame)
- A Coat of Many Colors (1897)
- The Moth and the Flame (1898)
- My Lady Dainty (1901)
- Manon Lescaut (1901)
- Her Lord and Master (1902)
- Taps (1904)
- The Daughters of Men (1907)
- The Learned Ladies (1911)
- Years of Discretion (1912)
- Children of Earth (1915)
- Pollyanna (1915)

== Filmography ==
- After the Ball (1914)
- The Sphinx (1916)
