= Her Boy (1918 film) =

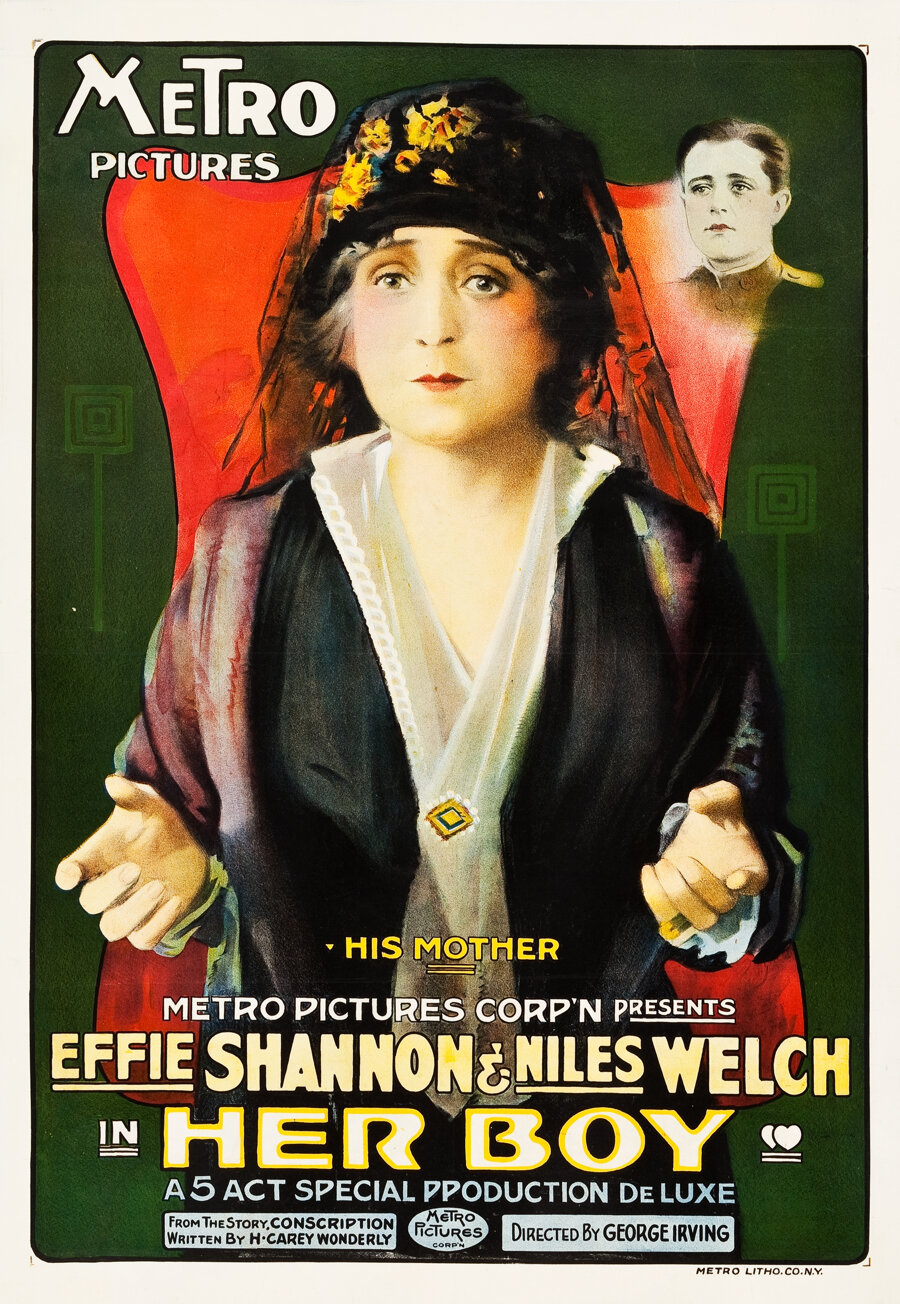
- Film poster
- Directed by: George Irving; Leander de Cordova
- Written by: Albert S. Le Vino (scenario); W. Carey Wonderly (story)
- Starring: Effie Shannon; Niles Welch
- Production company: Metro Pictures
- Distributed by: Metro Pictures
- Release date: January 28, 1918
- Running time: 5 reels
- Country: USA
- Language: Silent...English titles

Her Boy is a lost 1918 American silent film drama directed by George Irving and starring Effie Shannon and Niles Welch as her son. It was produced and distributed by the Metro Pictures company.

== Cast ==
- Effie Shannon as Helen Morrison
- Niles Welch as David Morrison
- Pauline Curley as Virginia Gordon
- James T. Galloway as Colonel Danby Gordon
- Pat O'Malley as Charlie Turner
- William Bechtel as Oscar Schultz
- Charles Sutton as Dr. Swift
- Charles Riegel as Reverend Mr. Kimberly
- Violet Axzelle as Gretchen
- James Robert Chandler as Abner Turner
- Ferike Boros as Mrs. Schultz
- Anthony Byrd
- S. McAlpin
- J.C. Bates
- Edmund Wright
