= The Sphinx (1916 film) =

1916 lost film directed by John G. Adolfi

- Directed by: John G. Adolfi
- Written by: Raymond L. Schrock
- Produced by: Red Feather Photoplays
- Starring: Herbert Kelcey; Effie Shannon
- Cinematography: Marcel A. Le Picard
- Distributed by: Universal Film Manufacturing Company
- Release date: February 14, 1916
- Running time: 5 reels
- Country: USA
- Language: Silent..English titles

The Sphinx is a lost 1916 silent film drama directed by John G. Adolfi and starring Effie Shannon and Herbert Kelcey. It was produced and distributed by Universal Film Manufacturing Company.

== Plot summary ==
Sphinx is a nickname given to a dancer, who interprets the classique. After the cares of the stage are brushed aside at night, a fast-driven limousine carries her to the Lion Head Apartments, where colored servitors wait upon her and deck her with perfume and flowers, for the coming of "Jim," her lover. Mr. Macklin is a widower, but has a son named Charles, who is studying art under the tutelage of M. Valentine, a French painter. Charles has become attached to Frances Evans, society girl, and their affection has resulted in their engagement. One day, during a class in art at M. Valentine's studio, where Charles is studying, the Sphinx calls. The master introduces her to Charles, but does not mention the boy's name, since he has a deep affection for the strange woman himself. The young art student falls under the spell of the Sphinx and his affection for Frances wanes. To his pleadings to receive him at her residence the dancer turns a deaf ear. A theater party, of which Charles and Frances are members, gives him his opportunity. Prominent in the performance is the sinuous dance of the Sphinx. Under a pretext he leaves his own party and trails the Sphinx to her home. When Charles appears at her apartment, she receives him with consternation. She is expecting Macklin. She is unaware that this is the son of her expected visitor, but decides that the jealous Macklin must not find another visitor there. When the latter arrives she begs Charles to conceal himself, but he agrees only when she promises to come to his studio the following day so that he may paint her portrait. The Sphinx hides Charles and when Macklin arrives hurries him into another room, while the maid allows Charles to slip unnoticed from the apartment, ignorant of the identity of her other visitor. The next day the Sphinx keeps her promise. She comes to Charles' studio, and a pose is arranged.

Frances, encouraged by Charles's sister to seek him at his studio. She calls just as Charles is engaged upon his big picture. Charles tells Frances that she is interfering with his work and prevails upon her to leave. She goes, but suspicion leads her to peer through the keyhole of the studio. The Sphinx consents to grant one kiss and Charles is enslaved. At this juncture Frances steals in upon them, Frances, tearing the engagement ring from her finger, runs away in tears. Charles laughs and turns to the Sphinx, who censures him for his conduct, calling him a heartless boy. Heartbroken, Frances goes to Charles' father and tells him that a worthless woman whom she does not know has ensnared the boy she loves, and that it was for her that he forsook the theater party. When Charles returns at night he is sternly taken to task by his father, but this has no effect on Charles. Charles calls upon the Sphinx and finds that she is making preparations for a birthday party. Macklin arrives and she again hides Charles. In the course of their conversation, Macklin discovers a half-burned cigarette, and demands to know where and who the other man is. She refuses to tell, and Macklin seizes her. Her screams bring Charles from his hiding place, and father and son come face to face and each recoils. In the woman before him Charles now sees but a shameless, tempting siren, and he wildly denounces her. Macklin is roused in her defense and springs at his son and there is a fight in which the father, striking his head on the floor, is rendered unconscious. Charles rushes wildly away; he is in the grasp of despair and soon is raving in delirium. The Sphinx explains to Macklin, who believes her, and asks her to be his wife. Charles, in his fever, keeps calling for the Sphinx. She, pitying his misery, goes to see him. The touch of her hand calms him and he falls asleep. The dancer gently disengages her hand and substitutes that of his fiancée. Macklin presents the sphinx to his daughter as his future wife.

== Cast ==
- Herbert Kelcey – Arthur Macklin
- Effie Shannon – The Sphinx
- Beatrice Noyes – Betty Macklin
- Charles Compton – Charles Macklin
- Louise Huff – Frances Evans
- William Bechtel – Monsieur Valentine
