= The Secrets of Paris =

1922 film

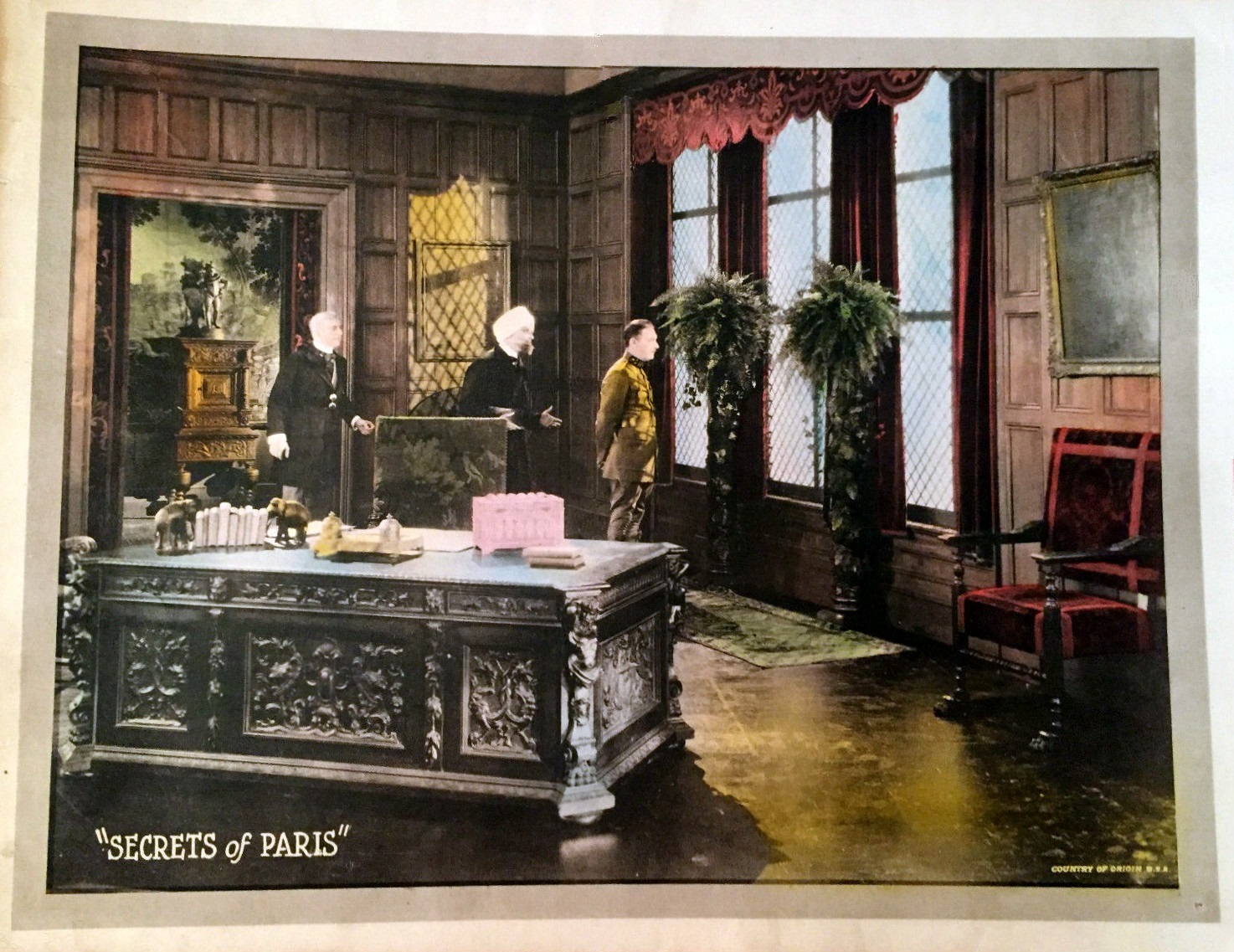
- Lobby card
- Directed by: Kenneth S. Webb
- Written by: Dorothy Farnum
- Based on: Mystères de Paris by Eugène Sue
- Produced by: Whitman Bennett; C.C. Burr
- Starring: Lew Cody; Gladys Hulette; Effie Shannon
- Cinematography: Edward Paul; Harry Stradling Sr.
- Production company: Whitman Bennett Productions
- Distributed by: Mastodon Films
- Release date: October 1, 1922
- Running time: 70 minutes
- Country: United States
- Language: Silent (English intertitles)

The Secrets of Paris is a 1922 American silent drama film directed by Kenneth S. Webb and starring Lew Cody, Gladys Hulette, and Effie Shannon.

== Cast ==
- Lew Cody as King Rudolph
- Gladys Hulette as Mayflower
- Effie Shannon as Madame Ferrand
- Montagu Love as The Schoolmaster
- Harry Sothern as Hoppy
- Rose Coghlan as Owl
- William Collier Jr. as François
- J. Barney Sherry as Chancellor
- Dolores Cassinelli as Lola
- Bradley Barker as The Hindoo
- Walter James as The Strangler
- Jane Thomas as Margot

== Preservation ==
No copies of The Secrets of Paris are located in any archives, making this a lost film.

== Bibliography ==
- Munden, Kenneth White. The American Film Institute Catalog of Motion Pictures Produced in the United States, Part 1. University of California Press, 1997.
