= After the Ball (1914 film) =

1914 film directed by Pierce Kingsley

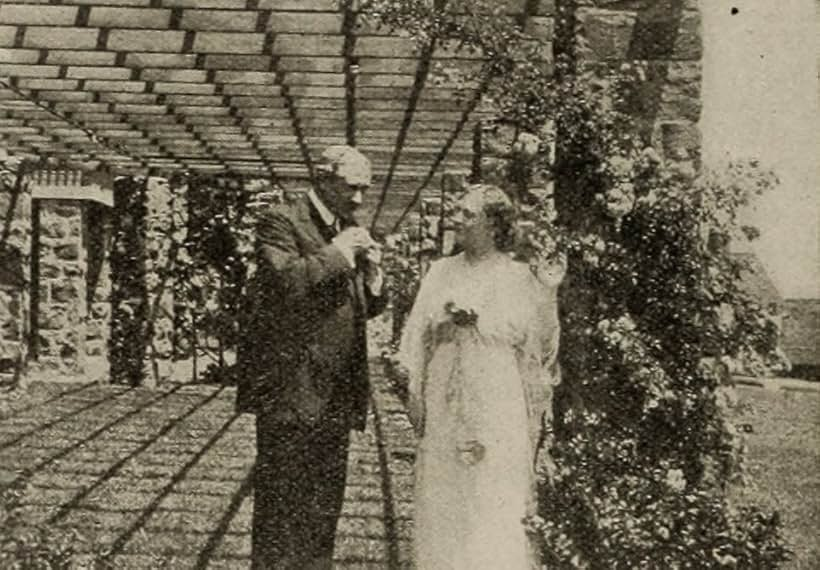
- Directed by: Pierce Kingsley
- Written by: Pierce Kingsley
- Based on: the song After the Ball by Charles K. Harris c.1892
- Produced by: Photo Drama Company; William Steiner
- Starring: Herbert Kelcey; Effie Shannon
- Distributed by: Photo Drama Company
- Release date: July 1914
- Running time: 6 reels

After the Ball is a lost 1914 American silent drama film directed by Pierce Kingsley and starring stage couple Herbert Kelcey and Effie Shannon.

== Cast ==
- Herbert Kelcey - John Dale
- Effie Shannon - Louise Tate
- Robert Vaughn - Gerald Tate
- William Clark - Mr. Tate, the Father
- Winona Bridges - Mrs. Tate, the Mother
- Robert Lawrence - Mr. Seward
- Jean Barry - Mrs. Seward
- Joyce Fair - Nina Seward
- Nicholas Burnham - The Doctor
- G. H. Adams - Briggs, John's Valet
- William Frederic - The Detective (as William Fredericks)
- Edythe Berwyn - The Nurse
- Barney McPhee - McPhee
- James A. Fitzgerald - Cody (*as J.A. Fitzgerald)
- J. S. Murray - Slim

== Preservation ==
With no holdings located in archives, After the Ball is considered a lost film.
