= Topsy and Eva =

1927 film by Del Lord

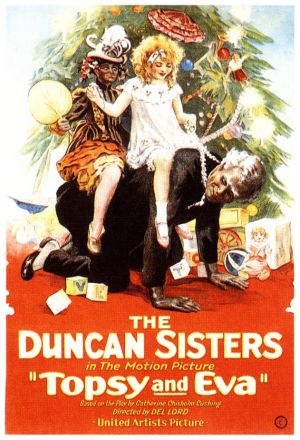
- Theatrical release poster
- Directed by: Del Lord
- Screenplay by: Catherine Chisholm Cushing; Scott Darling; Dudley Early; Lois Weber
- Based on: Uncle Tom's Cabin by Harriet Beecher Stowe
- Starring: Rosetta Duncan; Vivian Duncan; Gibson Gowland; Noble Johnson; Marjorie Daw
- Cinematography: John W. Boyle
- Production company: Feature Productions
- Distributed by: United Artists
- Release date: July 24, 1927
- Running time: 80 minutes
- Country: United States
- Language: English

Topsy and Eva is a 1927 American drama silent film directed by Del Lord and written by Catherine Chisholm Cushing, Scott Darling, Dudley Early and Lois Weber. D. W. Griffith also directed additional scenes. It is based on the two key female figures in Harriet Beecher Stowe's 1852 novel Uncle Tom's Cabin.

The film stars Rosetta Duncan, Vivian Duncan, Gibson Gowland, Noble Johnson and Marjorie Daw. The film was released on July 24, 1927, by United Artists.

== Cast ==
- Rosetta Duncan as Topsy
- Vivian Duncan as Eva
- Gibson Gowland as Simon Leegree
- Noble Johnson as Uncle Tom
- Marjorie Daw as Marietta
- Myrtle Ferguson as Aunt Ophelia
- Nils Asther as George Shelby
- Henry Victor as St. Claire
