= Jerry (play) =

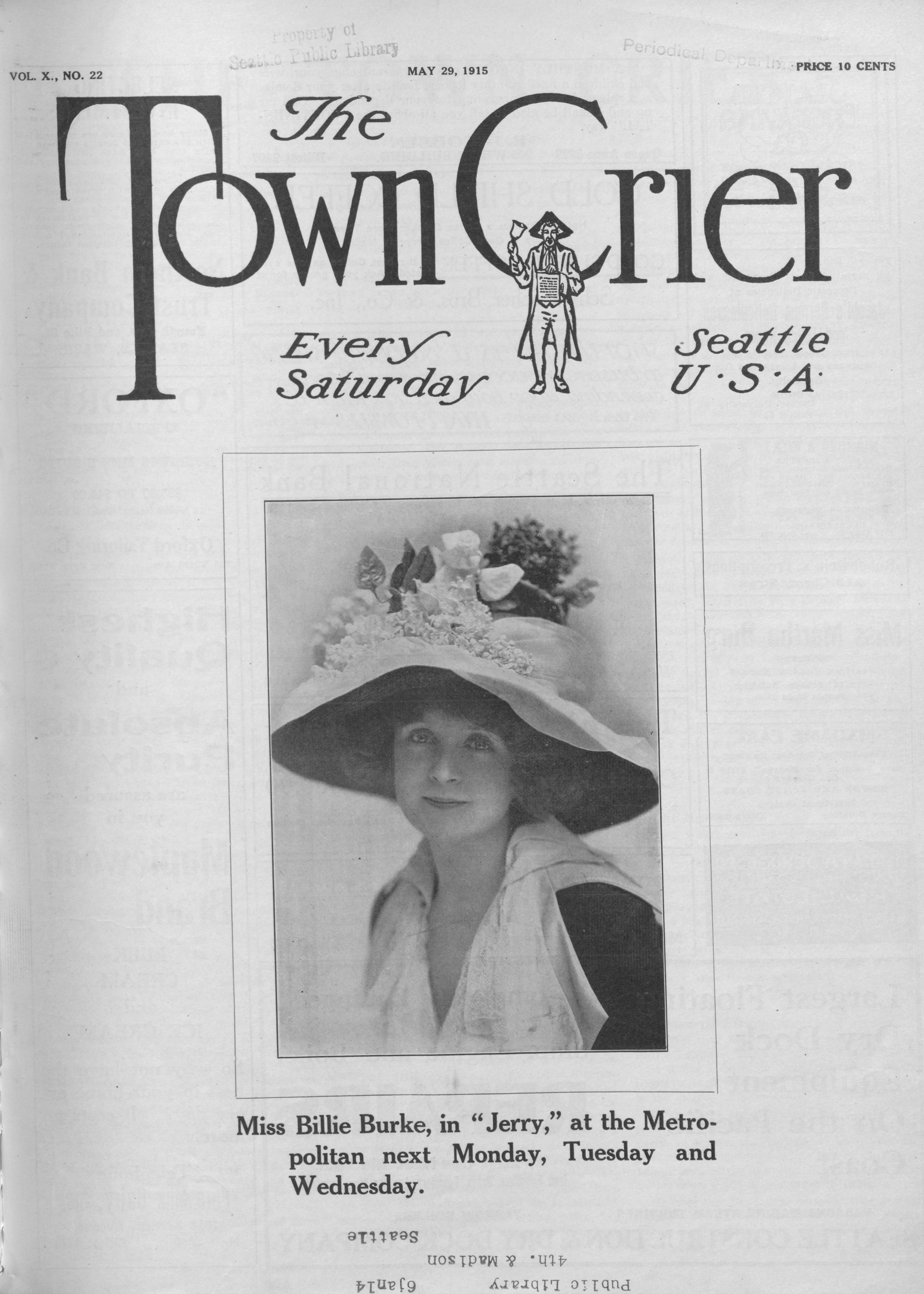
Seattle magazine The Town Crier features Billie Burke in the title role of Jerry during its national tour.

Jerry is a 1914 American play by Catherine Chisholm Cushing, written as a star vehicle for Billie Burke. It premiered on Broadway March 28, 1914 at the Lyceum Theatre, directed by Charles Frohman. After a three-month New York run, Burke toured the U.S. with the play, including runs in Chicago, Texas, Oklahoma, and Seattle. Although Burke was American-born, Jerry was the first time Burke appeared in a play by an American author, and the first time she played an American character onstage. She plays a brash Chicago girl visiting staid Philadelphia relatives. She ends up stealing away and marrying her Aunt Joan's longtime fiance, Montague Wade.

The New York Times review of the play singled out Gladys Hanson for praise in the role of the aunt, Joan Doubleday, while criticizing Burke for "irritating" overacting. "Jerry is Billie Burke raised to the nth power, Billie Burke laid on thick, Billie Burke very much overdone," while acknowledging that her fans were probably fine with that. They suggested that the play as first written by Cushman may have originally centered on the character of Joan Doubleday, and been rewritten to be more of a star vehicle for Burke, making it less of a comedy and more of a farce.

At the time of the production, Burke was managed by Charles Frohman, who postponed a trip to Europe in order to direct the play. The role gave her a chance to show her skills as a comedienne, and also to make a sensation in one scene where she appears in pajamas. On April 11, 1914, during the play's Broadway run, Burke married impresario Flo Ziegfeld in a private ceremony in Hoboken, New Jersey between the matinée and the evening performance.

== Original cast ==
- Billie Burke - "Jerry"
- Gladys Hanson - Joan Doubleday
- Lumsden Hare - Doctor Kirk
- Shelly Hull - Montagu Wade
- Alice Johns - Harriet Townsend
- Allan Pollock - Peter Flagg
- Thomas Reynolds - Briggs
- Bernard Thornton - Lewis

Cast per.
