= John Palgrave Simpson =

Victorian playwright

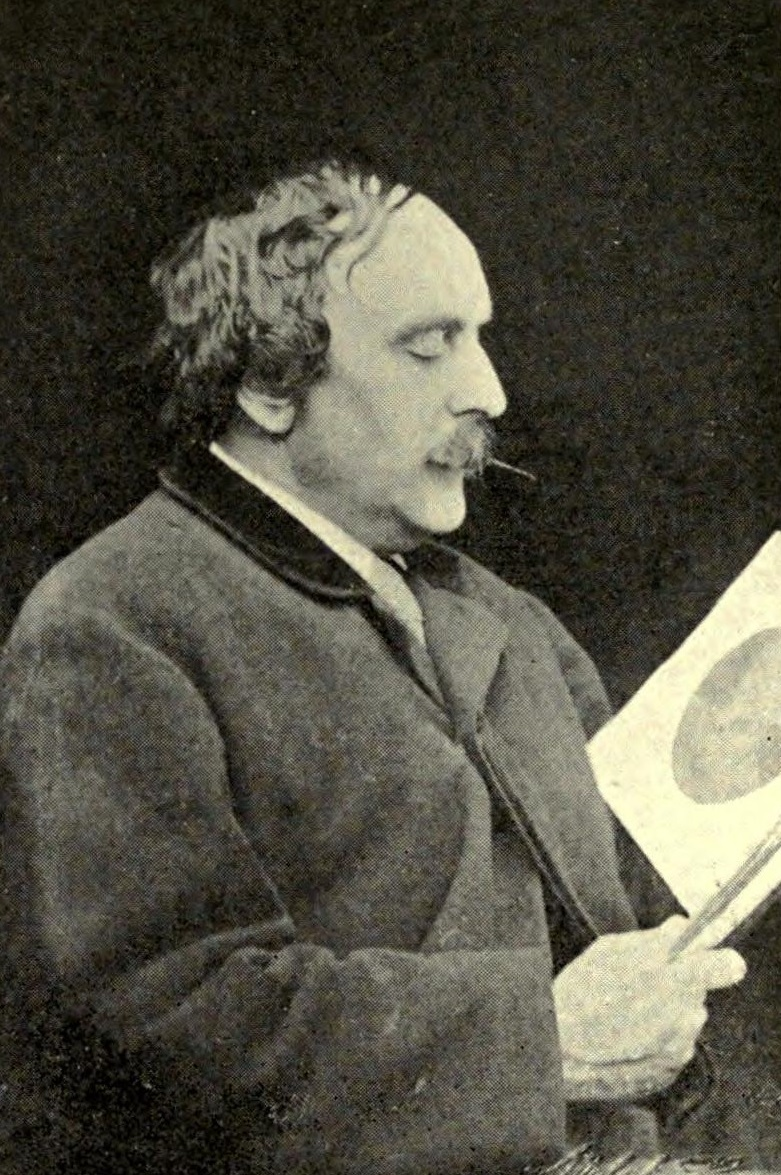
- Born: 13 June 1807; Norwich, England
- Died: 1887 (aged 79–80); South Kensington, London, England
- Education: Corpus Christi College, Cambridge
- Occupation: Playwright
- Writing career
- Genres: Drama; Comedy; Opera

John Palgrave Simpson (1807–1887) was a British playwright and author. He wrote more than fifty pieces in a variety of genres, including dramas, comedies, operas, and spectacles, between 1850 and 1885. Simpson also published novels, travel books and journalistic commentaries. He served as secretary of the Dramatic Authors' Society from 1868 to 1883.

== Biography ==
=== Early life and education ===
John Palgrave Simpson was born on 13 June 1807 in Norwich, the second of the six children of William and Katherine Simpson. His father was town clerk of Norwich and treasurer of the county of Norfolk. Simpson was educated by private tutors and at Corpus Christi College, Cambridge, where he took his B.A. in 1829 and M.A. in 1832. When he completed his studies, his parents encouraged him to enter the priesthood; instead, for the next fifteen years he traveled on the Continent, mainly living in Germany, at his father's expense. In 1842 he converted to Roman Catholicism in Munich.

=== Literary career ===
While never a groundbreaking playwright, Simpson was attuned to the interests of his audiences. His work was largely sentimental and his depictions of fractured father-daughter relationships, contested fortunes, mistaken identities, and trusting country folk versus scheming city dwellers reflect the melodramatic tastes of Victorian audiences in the second half of the century.

Simpson wrote more than 25 plays in a variety of styles. One of his most successful works was A Scrap of Paper, an adaptation of Les Pattes de mouche by Victorien Sardou, which opened at the St. James's Theatre on 22 April 1861. On 10 May 1865 Simpson's A Fair Pretender became one of the first plays staged at Marie Effie Wilton's Prince of Wales's Theatre. The Times (13 May 1865) described the play as "nightly thronged by one of the most fashionable audiences in London." In 1865 Simpson published Carl Maria von Weber: The Life of an Artist, a two-volume translation of the 1864 memoir of the composer by his son, Baron Max Maria von Weber. In 1868 Simpson was elected secretary of the Dramatic Authors' Society, which had been founded in 1833. In The profession of the Playwright: British Theatre 1800-1900 (1992).

Simpson's output was less prolific in the 1870s, perhaps as a consequence of his duties with the Dramatic Authors' Society, and he turned increasingly to adaptation and collaborations. In 1873 Simpson joined the young dramatist Herman Merivale to write Alone, which premiered at the Royal Court Theatre on 25 October. Simpson used Charles Dickens's novel Bleak House (1853) as the basis for Lady Dedlock's Secret, which premiered at Her Majesty's Theatre in Aberdeen on 3 April 1874 and appeared in Liverpool the same year but did not play in London until it opened at the Opera Comique on 26 March 1884. He collaborated with Merivale on an adaptation of Dickens's A Tale of Two Cities (1859) titled All for Her, which opened at the Mirror Theatre on 18 October 1875 and was revived into the 1890s. He also collaborated with Claude Templar on The Scar on the Wrist, which premiered at the St. James's on 9 March 1878, and on Zillah, which opened at the Lyceum in August 1879. In 1888 Coleman reflected that "the only work of Palgrave Simpson's which still holds the stage is Scrap of Paper.

=== Death ===
Simpson died in 1887. He is buried in St Thomas's Roman Catholic cemetery in Fulham.

== See also ==
- Olympic Theatre
