= It's a Great Life (1929 film) =

1929 film

- Lobby card
- Directed by: Sam Wood
- Screenplay by: Al Boasberg; Willard Mack
- Story by: Alfred Block; Byron Morgan; Leonard Praskins
- Starring: Rosetta Duncan; Vivian Duncan; Lawrence Gray; Jed Prouty; Benny Rubin
- Cinematography: J. Peverell Marley
- Edited by: Frank Sullivan
- Music by: William Axt
- Production company: Metro-Goldwyn-Mayer
- Distributed by: Metro-Goldwyn-Mayer
- Release date: December 6, 1929
- Running time: 93 minutes
- Country: United States
- Language: English

It's a Great Life is a 1929 American comedy film directed by Sam Wood and written by Al Boasberg and Willard Mack. The film stars Rosetta Duncan, Vivian Duncan, Lawrence Gray, Jed Prouty and Benny Rubin. The film was released on December 6, 1929, by Metro-Goldwyn-Mayer. During production, it was provisionally known as "Cotton and Silk".

Lobby card

== Plot ==
The film

Babe (Vivian Duncan) and Casey (Rosetta Duncan) Hogan are sisters and work in the department store Mandelbaum & Weill in the music sheet department. Once a year there is a big department store show, in which employees act. Babe Hogan in love with the piano player of the music sheet department James Dean (Lawrence Gray) is the younger sister and her older sister Casey is looking very much after her. When the act of Jimmy and Babe does not seem to work out, she improvises on the stage, rescuing the situation but also starting a new career for the three of them, as a producer was in the audience and liked them. Unfortunately Casey and Jimmy are antagonists in the trio, so one day they split, when Babe and Jimmy tell Casey they would get married. While Casey tries to get along as a Single Act in small Vaudeville stages, Babe and Jimmy do not have a bit of success as the duo Dean and Hogan. Moreover Babe gets a bad cold ending in delirium, so Jimmy finally puts away his pride and goes and sees Casey. Meanwhile old colleague David Parker (Jed Prouty) has come to ask Casey to marry him and go with him to Paris that night, as he is appointed Manager of the Paris branch of the store. Casey cannot believe that somebody loves her and accepts, but Jimmy convinces her that Babe is going to die if she does not see her sister. The marriage with Parker is off, and the three are reunited dreaming of having a big successful show.

== Cast ==
- Rosetta Duncan as Casey Hogan
- Vivian Duncan as Babe Hogan
- Lawrence Gray as Jimmy Dean
- Jed Prouty as Mr. David Parker
- Benny Rubin as Benny Friedman
- Clarence Burton as Policeman
- George Davis as Store show stage hand
- Oscar Apfel as Mr. Mandelbaum
- George Periolat as Mr. Weill
- Rolfe Sedan as Vaudeville violinist
- Ann Dvorak as Dancer in "Hoosier Hop" number

== See also ==
- List of early color feature films
- List of early sound feature films (1926–1929)
