= Duncan Sisters =

American entertainers; vaudeville duo

Vivian and Rosetta Duncan
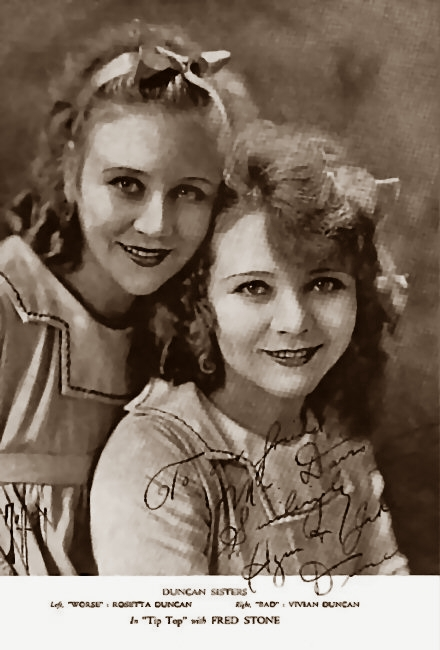
- L-R Rosetta and Vivian Duncan c. 1912
- Born: November 23, 1894 (Rosetta); June 17, 1897 (Vivian); Los Angeles, California (both)
- Died: December 4, 1959 (aged 65) (Rosetta); September 19, 1986 (aged 89) (Vivian); Berwyn, Illinois (Rosetta); Beverly Hills, California (Vivian)
- Years active: 1911–1959

The Duncan Sisters (Rosetta and Vivian Duncan) were an American vaudeville duo who became popular in the 1920s with their act Topsy and Eva.

== Biography ==
=== Early career ===
Rosetta (November 23, 1894 – December 4, 1959) and Vivian Duncan (June 17, 1897 – September 19, 1986) were born in Los Angeles, California, the daughters of a violinist turned salesman. They began their stage careers in 1911 as part of the cast of Gus Edwards' Kiddies' Revue.

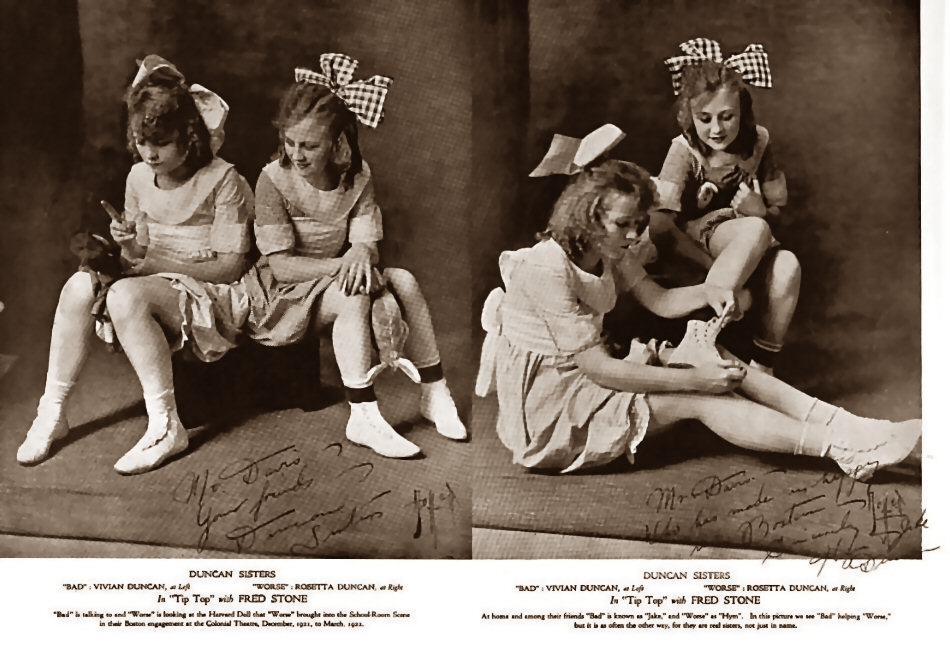
L-R Vivian and Rosetta Duncan c. 1912

During the next few years they perfected their act with Rosetta as a foghorn-voiced comedian and Vivian as the pretty-but-dumb blonde type. Within a few years they "matured into first-rate vaudeville troupers who wrote much of their music in dialogue." They subsequently played not only in vaudeville, but also in night clubs and on stage in both New York and London. They made their first important Broadway appearance in 1917 at the Winter Garden Theatre in a show with Ed Wynn and Frank Tinney entitled Doing Our Bit.

In 1923 the Duncans created their signature roles in Topsy and Eva (Rosetta as the former, in blackface, Vivian as the latter), a musical comedy derived from the novel Uncle Tom's Cabin by Harriet Beecher Stowe. For this production they wrote and introduced the songs "I Never Had a Mammy" and "Rememb'ring". A huge hit in its day, Topsy and Eva was subsequently adapted into a 1927 silent movie, directed by Del Lord with some additional scenes by D. W. Griffith.

=== It's a Great Life ===
In 1929 Metro-Goldwyn-Mayer released their early sound musical The Broadway Melody, starring Bessie Love and Anita Page as the fictional Mahoney sisters. The film proved to be highly successful so MGM decided to follow it up with a similar film, this time starring the real-life Duncan Sisters in the leads. The result was It's a Great Life (MGM, 1929), directed by Sam Wood and featuring three sequences filmed in Technicolor. In the film the Duncan Sisters performed two of their most popular songs, "I'm Following You" and "Hoosier Hop."

Photoplay magazine stated in their review:

Vivian and Rosetta Duncan have made a snappy, hilarious comedy of the life of a vaudeville sister team in this elaborate picture. It is crammed to the gunwales with Duncan comedy, and they do a lot of the vocalizing that made them famous. Listen for "Following You" – you'll care for it.

Unfortunately, the film "faltered at the box office and helped to cut short the Duncans' movie career." The movie, seldom seen for decades in part due to the color footage being missing, resurfaced in 2010 in a restored print released by Warner Bros. Archive.

MGM did cast the Duncans in their all-star 1930 extravaganza The March of Time, but that film was never completed. In 1935 the Duncans returned to the screen in the short musical Surprise! which featured footage of them reprising their Topsy and Eva characters.

=== Later years ===
In 1930 Vivian married actor Nils Asther, who had co-starred with her and Rosetta in the film version of Topsy and Eva. Vivian and Nils had a daughter Evelyn. Rosetta (who was lesbian) attempted a solo career for a few years, but was rejoined with Vivian in 1932 after Vivian's divorce from Asther.

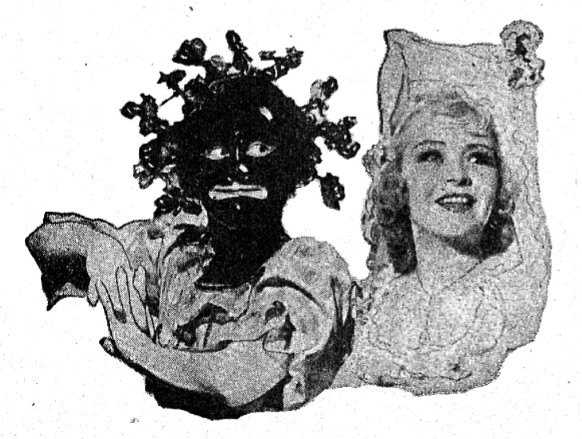
The Duncan Sisters as Topsy and Eva, circa 1945

Although by now past their prime, the Duncan Sisters continued as a popular night club entertainers act for several more decades. They also appeared in several soundies and also on television's You Asked For It. In the late 1940s the Duncans wrote and recorded four Christmas selections for the Hollywood Recording Guild Inc.: "Dear Santy", "The Angel on the Top of the X-mas Tree", "Twimmin' de Cwis'mas Twee" and "Jolly Ole Fella". These appeared on 7" extended play 78 rpm kiddie records.

In 1956 both Rosetta and Vivian appeared on Liberace's television show. They sang some of their songs and did their Topsy and Eva routine.

Their act ended in 1959 when Rosetta died from injuries sustained in an automobile accident, where she apparently fell asleep at the wheel while returning from a performance engagement, in Cicero, Illinois. Vivian, who by that time had remarried to Frank Herman, subsequently continued performing as a single act on the club circuit. She died of Alzheimer's disease in 1986.

== Broadway appearances ==
#	Title	Dates	Rosetta's Role	Vivian's Role	Notes
1	Doing Our Bit	Oct 18, 1917 – Feb 9, 1918	Herself	Herself	Their Broadway debut.
2	She's a Good Fellow	May 5, 1919 - Aug 16, 1919	Mazie Moore	Betty Blair	
3	Tip Top	Oct 5, 1920 - May 7, 1921	Herself	Herself	A revue.
4	Topsy and Eva	Dec 23, 1924 - May 9, 1925	Topsy	Eva St. Clare	Their biggest success, a musical comedy adapted from Harriet Beecher Stowe's Uncle Tom's Cabin.

== Screen appearances ==
#	Title	Year	Rosetta's Role	Vivian's Role	Notes
1	Topsy and Eva	1927	Topsy	Eva	A silent film adaptation of their stage hit. Partially directed by D. W. Griffith.
2	Two Flaming Youths	1927	Herself	Herself	A now-lost silent film starring W. C. Fields, with the Duncans doing a cameo appearance.
3	It's a Great Life	1929	Casey Hogan	Babe Hogan	An early sound musical with Technicolor sequences.
4	The March of Time	1930	Herself	Herself	An all-star extravaganza - never completed.
5	The Voice of Hollywood No. 7	1930	Herself	Herself	Documentary
6	Hello Pop!	1933	Herself	Herself	
7	Surprise!	1935	Rosie and "Topsy"	Vivian and "Eva"	A two-reel short.

== Selected recordings ==
Year	Title	Year	Title	Year	Year
1923	The Music Lesson (Do-Re-Mi)	1924	In Sweet Onion Time	1929	Just Give the Southland to Me
1923	Baby Sister Blues	1924	Mean Cicero Blues	1929	Hula-Hula Lullaby
1923	The Argentines, The Portuguese, and the Greeks	1924	Cross Word Puzzle Blues	1930	I Got a "Code" in My "Doze"
1923	Stick in the Mud	1926	The Kinky Kids' Parade	1930	It's an Old Spanish Custom
1923	Remembr'ing	1926	Happy-Go-Lucky Days	1930	Hoosier Hop
1923	I Never Had a Mammy	1926	Lickens	1930	I'm Following You
1924	Um-um-da-da	1927	Black and Blue Blues	1947	I Never Had a Mammy
1924	Aunt Susie's Picnic Day	1927	Dawning	1947	Rememb'ring
1924	Bull Frog Patrol	1927	Baby Feet Go Pitter-Patter	1947	White Christmas
1924	Tom Boy Blues	1928	The Music Lesson	1947	Jingle Bells
1924	Vocalizing	1928	The Argentines, The Portuguese, and the Greeks		

== See also ==
- Blanche Merrill
