= Effie Shannon =

American actress (1867–1954)

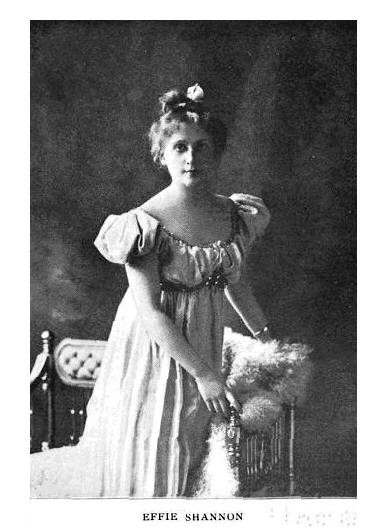
- Famous Actresses of the Day in America, Volume 1 by Lewis Clinton Strang, published 1899
- Born: May 13, 1867; Cambridge, Massachusetts, United States
- Died: July 24, 1954 (aged 87); Bay Shore, New York, United States
- Occupation: Actress
- Years active: 1886–1944
- Spouse(s): Henry Guy Carleton m.1890-1893; divorced,
- Partner(s): Herbert Kelcey; not married, acting-partner

Effie Shannon (May 13, 1867 – July 24, 1954) was an American stage and silent screen actress.

== Biography ==
Shannon had a 60-year career as starring performer and later character actress. She began as a child actor appearing with John McCullough and later in 1886 with Robert B. Mantell. She was one of the founding members of the Twelfth Night Club for female actresses in 1891 (along with Alice Fisher, Lelena Fisher and Maida Craigen).

Her partner and/or husband was Herbert Kelcey who died in 1917. They appeared in numerous plays as a team predating by a generation the famous Lunt and Fontanne as a great Broadway romantic team. Effie's sister, Winona Shannon (1874-1950) was also an actress and regularly performed in the Herbert Kelcey and Effie Shannon Company. In 1914, Effie appeared in her first silent film along with Kelcey. They made one more film together in 1916 before his 1917 death. Shannon continued to appear in silent films and early sound films until 1932 while still appearing on Broadway. One of her later roles was in a revival of Arsenic and Old Lace.

Shannon appeared at the legendary Elitch Theatre as part of the Summer stock cast in 1900 and 1929.

On September 16, 1932 Peg Entwhistle, wearing a dress borrowed from Shannon, jumped to her death from the top of the Hollywoodland sign.

== Filmography ==
Year	Title	Role	Notes
1914	After the Ball	Louise Tate	Lost film
1916	The Sphinx	The Sphinx	Lost film
1918	Her Boy	Helen Morrison	Lost film
1918	Ashes of Love	Louise Mordyke	Incomplete film
1919	The Common Cause	Belgium (prologue)	Lost film
1921	Mama's Affair	Mrs. Orrin	
1922	Sure Fire Flint	Mrs. De Lanni	Lost film
1922	The Man Who Played God	Mildred Arden	
1922	The Secrets of Paris	Madame Ferrand	Lost film
1923	The Tie That Binds	Mrs. Mills	Lost film
1923	Jacqueline	Her Mother	Lost film
1923	Bright Lights of Broadway	Mrs. Grimm, Landlady	
1924	Roulette	Mrs. Marineaux	Lost film
1924	Damaged Hearts	His Wife	Lost film
1924	The Side Show of Life	Lady Verity-Stewart	
1924	Sinners In Heaven	Mrs. Stockley	Lost film
1924	Greater Than Marriage	Mother	
1925	Soul-Fire	Mrs. Howard Fane - Eric's Mother	
1925	Sally of the Sawdust	Mrs. Foster	
1925	Wandering Fires	Mrs. Satorius	
1925	The New Commandment	Marquise de la Salle	Lost film
1925	Pearl of Love	Mrs. Kittridge	Lost film
1926	The Highbinders	Mrs. James Cortright	Lost film
1929	Highlowbrow		Short
1932	The Wiser Sex	Mrs. Hughes	

== Sources ==
- Lamparski, R. (1981) Lamparsaki's Hidden Hollywood, Simon & Schuster: New York. ISBN 0671418858.
