= Skyscrapers (film) =

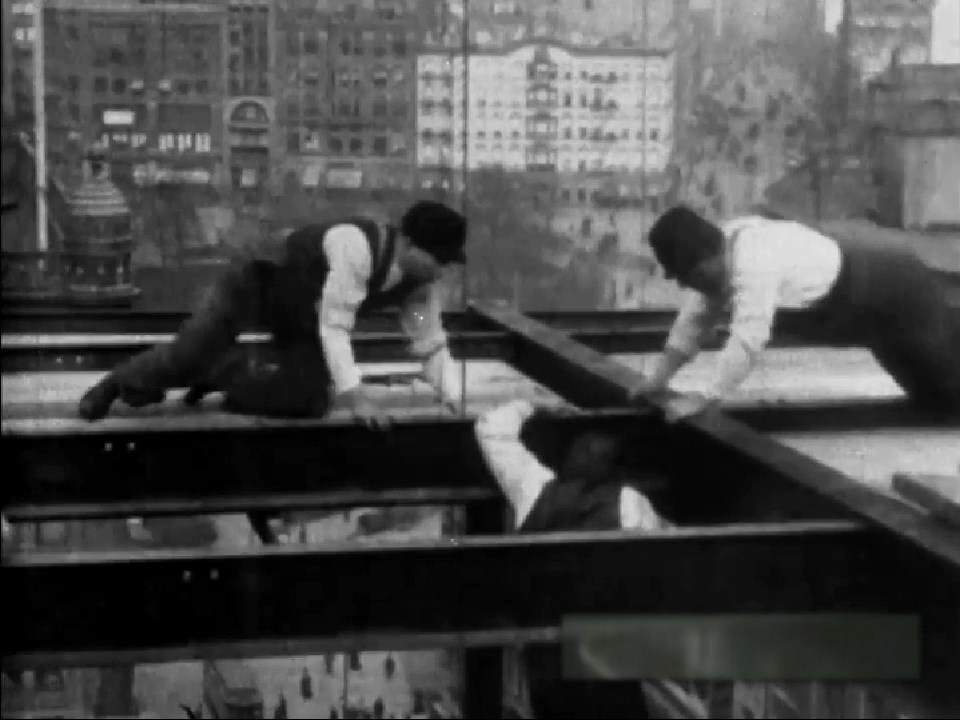
- Starring: Gene Gauntier; Jim Slevin
- Cinematography: F.A. Dobson
- Production company: Biograph Company
- Release date: December 8, 1906
- Running time: 8 minutes
- Country: United States
- Language: Silent film

Skyscrapers, also known as The Skyscrapers of New York, is an American silent film produced by the Biograph Company which was almost entirely filmed on location on the construction site of one of New York's tallest skyscrapers.

== Plot summary ==
In New York City, a worker on a skyscraper construction site, Dago Pete, is fired by the foreman for having started a fight with another worker. As a vengeance, he robs the contractor's watch and pins the blame on the foreman. In a fight on top of the skyscraper, the foreman throws the contractor off a platform. but the latter luckily grabs hold of a girder and is rescued. At the foreman's trial, Dago Pete is exposed by the foreman's young daughter and the contractor and foreman are reconciled.

== Cast ==
- Gene Gauntier
- Jim Slevin

== Analysis ==
The film is composed of 12 shots and seven intertitles. Rather than formally introducing scenes, the intertitles give information with respect to the characters or their actions.

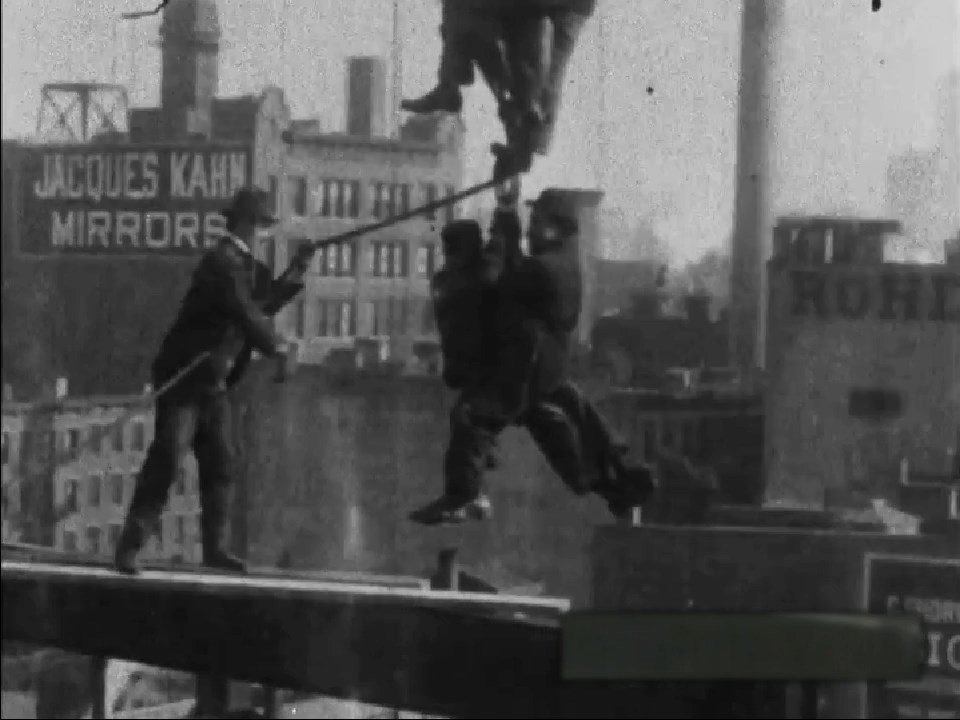
Shot 5

1. Panoramic view of New York.

2. Men working at a great height on a skyscraper.

3. Other view angle with a river in the background and a man surveying the work.

4. Other view angle. A metal beam is put in place.

5. Other view angle with a church in the background. Four men are hanging from a cable. The camera pans to follow them as the crane rotates.

Intertitle: Dago Pete starts a fight and is discharged.

6. Some workers are fighting on a high floor of a construction site. The contractor separates them.

Intertitle: To get even he robs the contractor.

7. Another view of the construction site. The contractor walks in, removes his jacket and put it on a chair before leaving. Dago Pete comes in and takes the contractor's wallet and watch from his jacket.

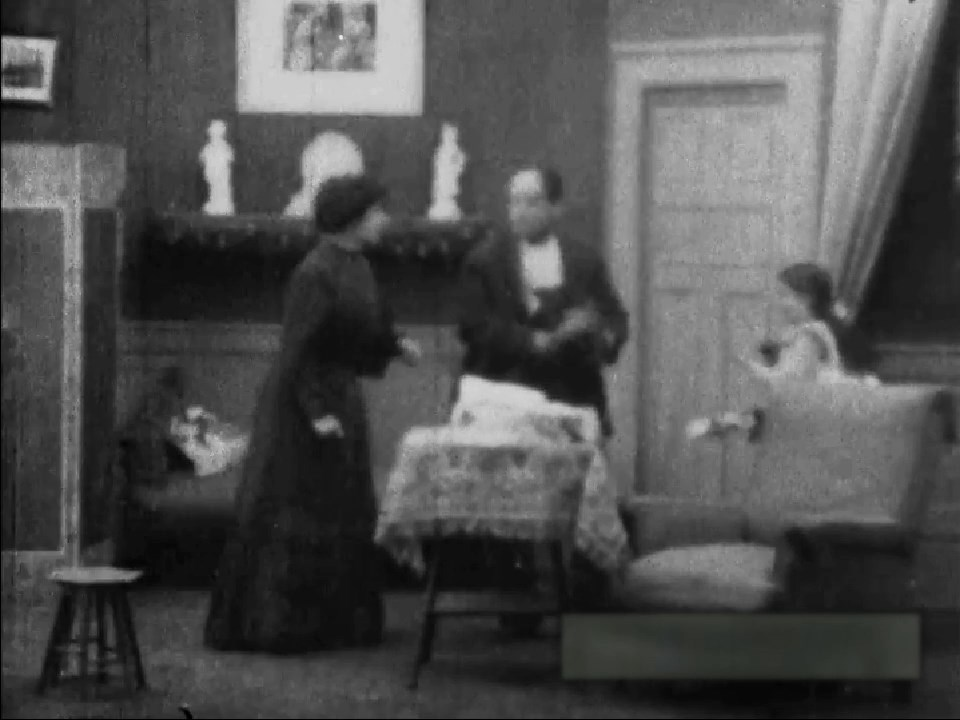
Shot 9

Intertitle: He returns to the building and accuses the foreman of the theft.

8. Same as 7. The contractor returns with the foreman. He finds that his wallet has disappeared. Dago Pete enters and says something in his ear. The contractor grabs the foreman and violently argues with him.

Intertitle: He secretes the stolen property in the home of the foreman.

9. A parlour with a woman knitting and a little girl playing on the floor. Dago Pete enters and asks the woman something. She leaves the room and he chases away the little girl. He hides wallet and watch behind a clock not noticing that the little girl had seen him.

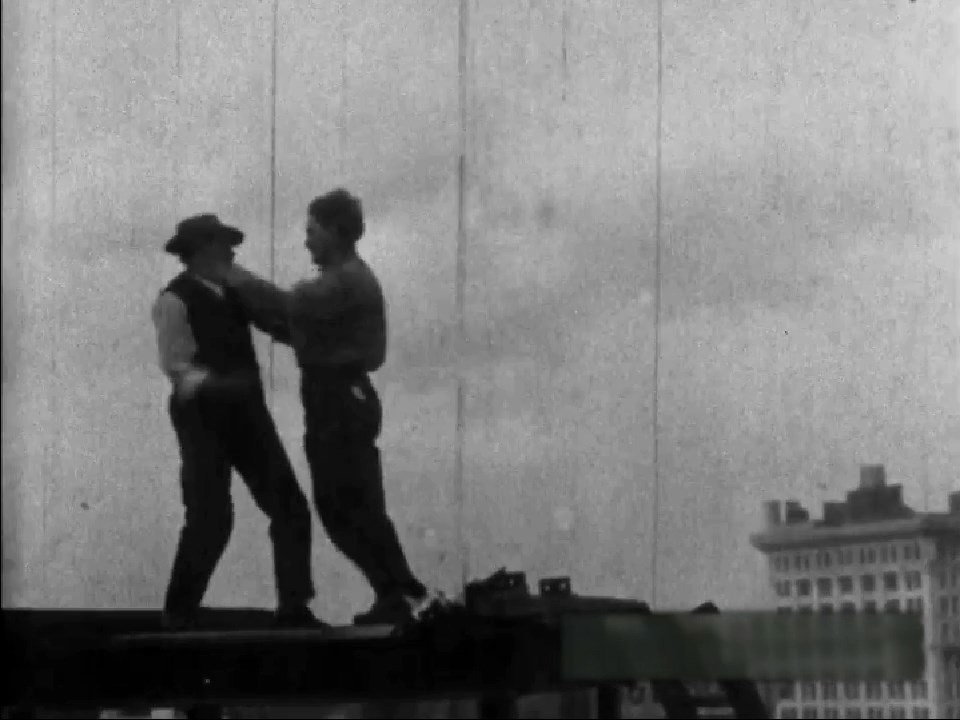
Shot 10

Intertitle: Atop the skyscraper. Thrilling hand-to-hand encounter on one of the highest building erected in New York.

10. The foreman and the contractor are standing on a metal beam on the top of the construction site. The argue and start a fight. The foreman hits the contractor and make him fall from the beam.

Intertitle: Rescue of the contractor

11. One floor below on the construction site. The contractor is grabbing a beam and two men come to his rescue.

Intertitle: The culprit exposed

12. A court of law. The foreman, the contractor, Dago and a lawyer are arguing in front of a judge. Suddenly a man enters accompanied by the little girl. He puts the wallet and the clock on the judge's desk and ask a question to the little girl who answers by pointing at Dago. A policeman takes Dago away. The lawyer invites the contractor to extend his hand to the foreman who, after a moment's hesitation, shakes it warmly.

Steven J. Ross mentions this film as characteristic of the working-class films, using workers and immigrants as their protagonists, which were very popular in early American cinema because "workers and immigrants formed the core of the industry's early market." He observes that "Immigrants were especially drawn to an entertainment that required little knowledge of English. The Russian Jew, the German, the Austrian, or the Italian who has not been in this country a week and cannot understand English (...) goes to the motion picture theaters because what he sees on the screen is very real to him, and he understands as well as the American." He also stresses that the film presents "extraordinary scenes shot (...) atop the city's massive skyscrapers." Gwendolyn Audrey Foster gives this film as one example of films dealing "with actual street life and the consequences of poverty and labor."

Charles Musser remarks that both Skyscrapers and another film produced by Biograph in 1906, The Tunnel Workers, "involve melodramatic confrontations between men from different levels of management, and both were shot on locations that received significant news coverage." He notes the contrast between the actuality material included at the beginning of the film (five first shots) and the scenes shot on location with professional actors which display "a wide range of presentational elements (conventionalized acting gestures, melodramatically contrived plots) with the result that an informal, spontaneous, catch-as-catch-can style of filming suddenly shifts to old-style theatrical conventions as quotidian space is turned into a stage." Ilaria Serra stresses the interest of the first five shots: the introductory panoramic from a camera placed on a skyscraper "gives a unique view of an infant New York, its rooftops, a cupola, buildings, and some surviving trees. The camera then turns toward the groups of workers (...) There is always someone who stares at the camera and gives spontaneity to the scene, reminding us that these are not actors. The camera moves on to two breathtaking subjects: a group of workers climbing on big iron bars—the bone structure of the skyscraper and remaining suspended there and four other workers in groups of two hanging from the iron rope of a huge crane and moving through the emptiness [followed by] a camera movement that shows buildings and factories."

These two authors also note the anti-immigrant component of this film, which was also found in many other early American films. Charles Musser mentions that the film "reveals an anti-immigrant (particularly anti-Italian) prejudice, with ethnic background providing the sole motivation for reprehensible actions and the immigrant himself fostering misunderstandings between native-born whites." Ilaria Serra recalls that "the Great Migration took place at the same time cinema was developing" and that "American cinema has a double tie with immigration: treating immigrants both as characters and as spectators." He stresses that it is the Italian Dago Pete "who is chosen to represent the rotten apple (...) he provokes the fight without any reason, he is thirsty for vengeance, premeditated in his plan, cruel to children, and remorseless in the courtroom, where he is curved and crooked in front of the Americans with erect backs and clean consciences." The first intertitle includes "one of the most common and offensive nicknames for Italians, Dago, as if it were the first name of the protagonist. In doing this, the filmmaker is talking to a public that will not be scandalized by such spiteful treatment. The diffusion of these nicknames — dago, wop, greaseball — with malevolent origins and purpose is so widespread that they alone are enough to define the Italian nationality."
