= The Reform Candidate =

1915 American drama silent film directed by Frank Lloyd

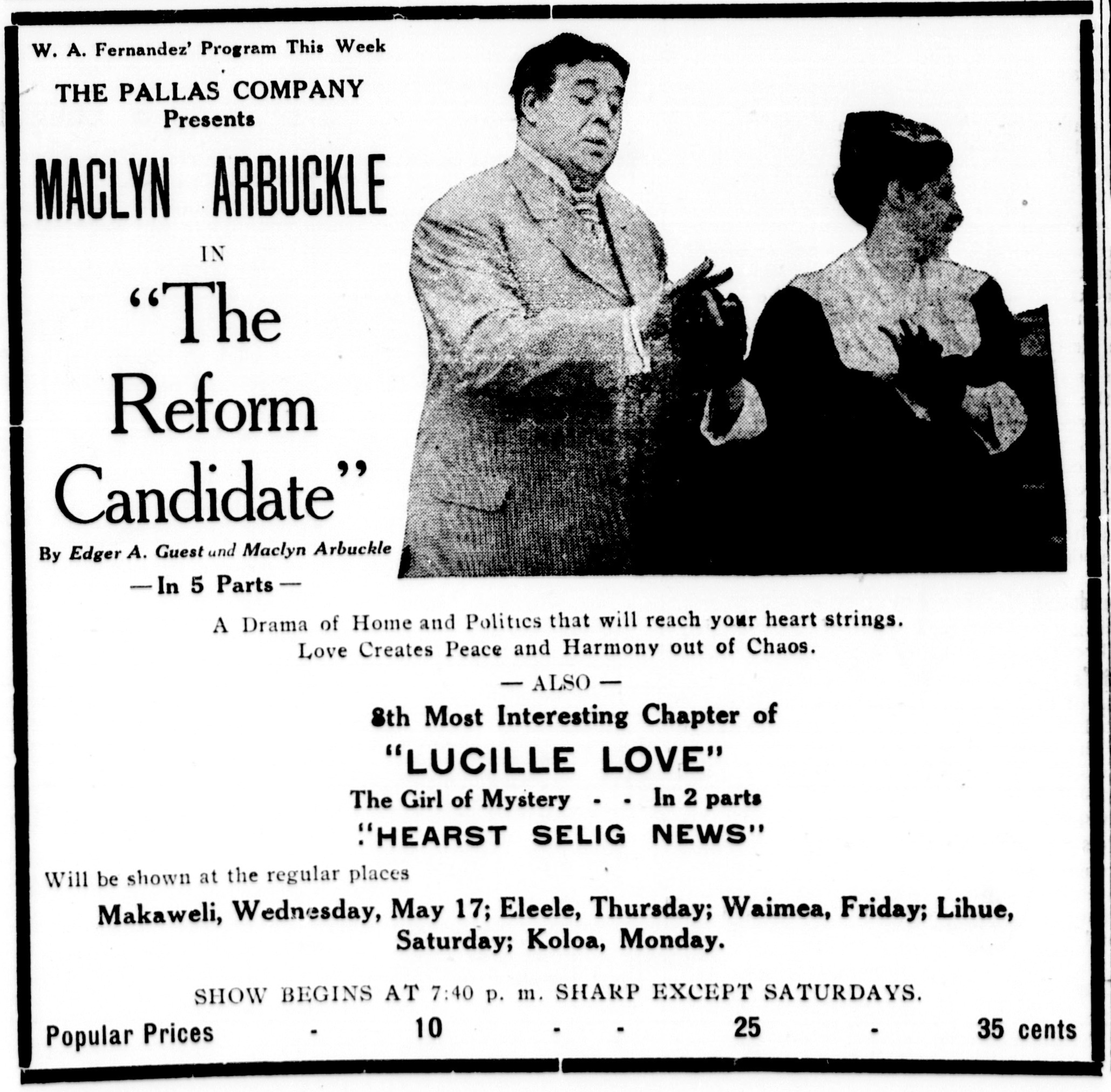
- Newspaper advertisement.
- Directed by: Frank Lloyd
- Screenplay by: Julia Crawford Ivers
- Story by: Macklyn Arbuckle; Edgar A. Guest
- Starring: Macklyn Arbuckle; Forrest Stanley; Myrtle Stedman; Malcolm Blevins; Charlie Ruggles; Mary Ruby
- Cinematography: F.A. Dobson
- Production company: Pallas Pictures
- Distributed by: Paramount Pictures
- Release date: December 16, 1915
- Running time: 50 minutes
- Country: United States
- Language: English

The Reform Candidate is a surviving 1915 American drama silent film directed by Frank Lloyd and written by Julia Crawford Ivers. The film stars Macklyn Arbuckle, Forrest Stanley, Myrtle Stedman, Malcolm Blevins, Charlie Ruggles and Mary Ruby. The film was released on December 16, 1915, by Paramount Pictures.

== Plot ==
The film was advertised in contemporary newspapers as "a drama of home and politics that will reach your heart strings."

== Cast ==
- Macklyn Arbuckle as Art Hoke
- Forrest Stanley as Richard Benton
- Myrtle Stedman as Mary Grandell
- Malcolm Blevins as Frank Grandell
- Charlie Ruggles as Loony Jim
- Mary Ruby as May Hoke
- Howard Davies as The Campaign Manager
- Jane Darwell as Mrs. Haggerty
- Fanny Stockbridge as Hoke's Housekeeper
- Mary Higby as Nurse's Mother

== Preservation status ==
- A complete print is held by the UCLA Film and Television Archive.
