= The Tongues of Men =

1916 film by Frank Lloyd

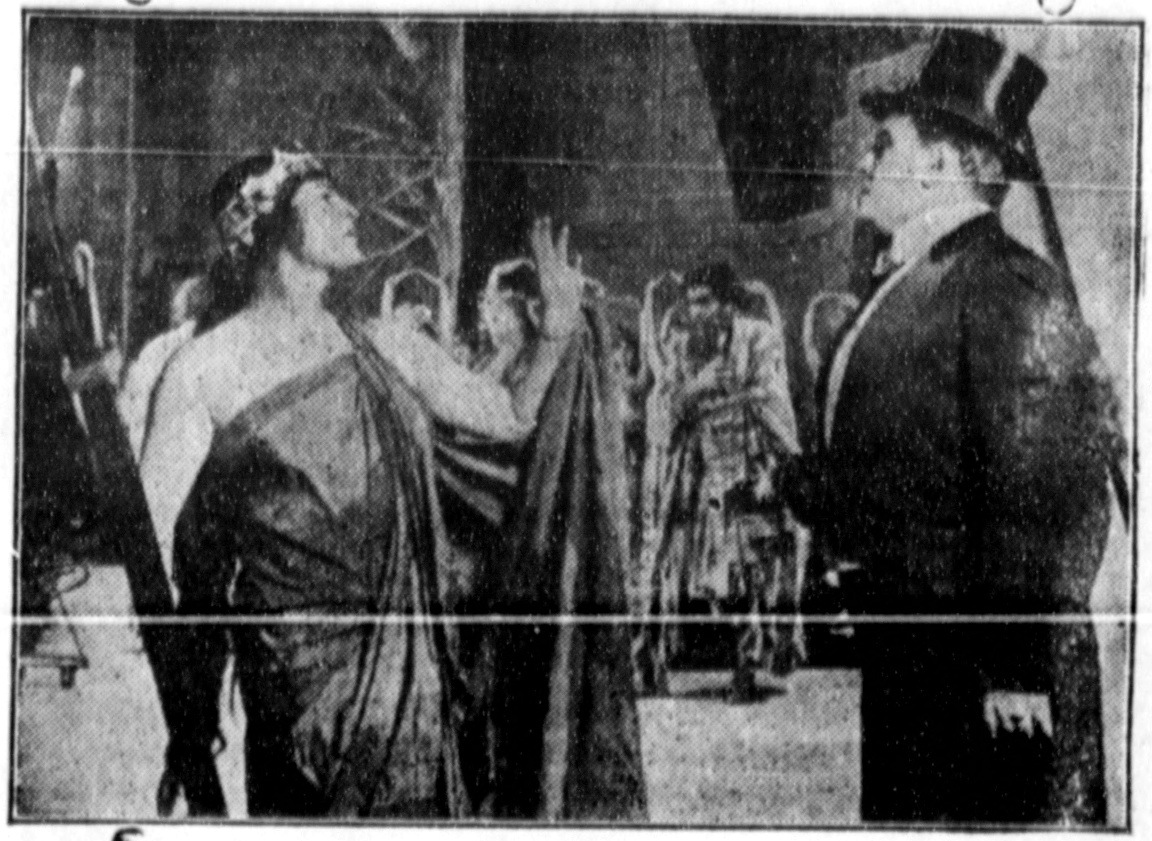
- Scene from the film.
- Directed by: Frank Lloyd
- Written by: Edward Childs Carpenter (play)
- Produced by: Oliver Morosco
- Starring: Constance Collier
- Cinematography: F.A. Dobson
- Distributed by: Paramount Pictures
- Release date: January 6, 1916
- Running time: 5 reels
- Country: United States
- Language: Silent film (English intertitles)

The Tongues of Men is a 1916 silent film drama produced by the Oliver Morosco Company and distributed by Paramount Pictures. Frank Lloyd directed and English stage actress Constance Collier stars in her debut film. The story is based on a 1913 Broadway play, The Tongues of Men, by Edward Childs Carpenter and starring Henrietta Crosman.

== Status ==
The Library of Congress Silent Film Survival database shows no holdings for the film (since updated 5/2023), however their 1978 printed Catalog of Holdings lists the film as being preserved in the collection in an incomplete print.

== Cast ==
- Constance Collier - Jane Bartlett
- Forrest Stanley - Rev. Sturgis
- Herbert Standing - Rev. Dr. Darigal
- Betty Burbridge - Georgine (*Elizabeth Burbridge)
- Helen Jerome Eddy - Winifred Leeds
- Lamar Johnstone - Dr. Lyn Fanshawe (*as Lamar Johnson)
- Lydia Yeamans Titus - Mrs. Kearsley
- Helen Marlborough - Mme. Sternberg-Reese (*as Miss Marlborough)
- Charles Marriott - Mr. Goadby
- John McKinnon - Mr. Loughram
