= F. A. Dobson =

American cinematographer

F.A. Dobson
- Born: Frederick Albert Dobson; June 1, 1866; Utica, New York, USA
- Died: April 13, 1948 (aged 81); Stanislaus, California, USA
- Occupation: Cinematographer
- Spouses: Georgia Conroy (divorced) Katherine Rehfuss (divorced)

Frederick "F.A." Dobson was an American cinematographer who worked in Hollywood during its earliest years.

== Biography ==
Dobson was born in Utica, New York, to John Dobson and Emma Young.

With the advent of the motion picture industry, he began working for the American Mutoscope and Biograph Company in New York. He ultimately shot more than 100 silent films between 1898 and 1916, including notably Skyscrapers shot in 1906 on the construction site of one of New-York's tallest skyscrapers.

Dobson had two marriages. Georgia Conroy was the bride of his first union in 1891. In 1909, he wed Katherine Rehfuss; the couple had a daughter named Emma before divorcing.

== Selected filmography ==
- Skyscrapers (1906)
- The Tongues of Men (1916)
- The Reform Candidate (1915)
- The Gentleman from Indiana (1915)
- The Banker's Daughter (1914)
- The Gentleman from Indiana (1915)
- The Reform Candidate (1915)
- The Tongues of Men (1916)
