= Jim Slevin =

Rugby footballer

James Slevin was born on 29 November 1861 in Ireland. He played rugby football from 1879 through to 1891 for Wigan and was involved in re-forming the club in 1879 at the age of 17.

== Early life and athletic accomplishments ==
He attended the Wigan Grammar School and had a gift for speed and running. At age 14, in a local athletics competition, he won a running race. In September 1877, Slevin won a quarter-mile handicap race in just under 61 seconds. He ran 110 yards, at age 16, in around 12.4 seconds. He was a member and captain of the Wigan Hare and Hounds Club. He was also a hurdler. He was a prolific winner, his biggest wins being in the 220-yard hurdles at Preston and Wigan in 1881 and 1882, and at Rainhill and Wigan in 1883.

== Rugby career ==
His rugby career at Wigan spanned from 1879 to 1891, with the majority of it as captain. He was predominantly a three-quarter back and mainly played on the right wing during his career. On debut however, he played at half-back.

He made 290 appearances for the club, scoring 131 tries and winning 8 trophies.

== Personal life ==
Jim died, aged 55, on 27 July 1917 from pneumonia.
